= List of people executed for homosexuality in Europe =

Societal attitudes towards same-sex relationships have varied over time and place, from expecting all males to engage in same-sex relationships, to casual integration, through acceptance, to seeing the practice as a minor sin, repressing it through law enforcement and judicial mechanisms, and to proscribing it under penalty of death. The following individuals received the death penalty for it in Europe or under European authority abroad.

== Executed individuals ==
=== Belgium ===
Name	Date	Notes
John de Wettre	8 September 1292	A "maker of small knives" condemned at Ghent and burned at the pillory next to St. Peter's.
Unknown	1307	Woman, burned in Ghent.
Kalle van der Roemporten	1364	Elderly woman, burned in Ghent.
Willem Case	1373	Burned in Antwerp.
Jan van Aersdone	1373	Burned in Antwerp.
Lijsbette Pijlysers	1374	Women from Vrasene, burned in Ghent.
Amele sMuelneeren	1374	Women from Vrasene, burned in Ghent.
Kalle sLathouers	1374	Women from Vrasene, burned in Ghent.
Marie van Gheeraerdsberghe	1374	Women from Vrasene, burned in Ghent.
Meerin van der Haghe	1374	Women from Vrasene, burned in Ghent.
Celie Elwouds	1375	Burned in Ghent.
Two unknowns	1375	Burned in Ypres.
Unknown	1391	Burned, one of 17 defendants (including 2 women) at a mass trial in Mechelen; only one to confess.
Matthijs De Houthackere	1400	Young squire, burned in Bruges "due to the bourgeoisie."
Jehan Eyveraerd	1414	Prussian, burned in Ypres. Arrested on suspicion of spying for possessing "suspicious books in German and Latin," he confessed to committing "the filthy offense which is called buggery so many times, he could not put a number on it."
Lamsin Le But	1416	Burned in Ypres. Born in Woumen, he was previously imprisoned for murder in Sluis.
Unknown	1427	Beheaded in Halen.
Marie de Valmerbeke	1434	Mother and daughter, burned in Ghent. Condemned for taking advantage of their maid, Margarete Scoucx; Scoucx's position was acknowledged by the courts, so she was only exiled for 10 years.
Belle Wasbiers	1434	Mother and daughter, burned in Ghent. Condemned for taking advantage of their maid, Margarete Scoucx; Scoucx's position was acknowledged by the courts, so she was only exiled for 10 years.
Pierre Dheict	1454	Two clerics (frère) and a layman, burned in Bruges.
Cornille vander Mast'	1454	Two clerics (frère) and a layman, burned in Bruges.
Anthoine van Boitem	1454	Two clerics (frère) and a layman, burned in Bruges.
Unknown	1462	Burned in Meulebeke.
Cornelis de Bussere	1469	Burned in Bruges. de Bussere was a member of the local grocer's guild, owning a house near the city crane which was used for handling imported and exported goods.
Pieter Van Claren	1469	Burned in Bruges. de Bussere was a member of the local grocer's guild, owning a house near the city crane which was used for handling imported and exported goods.
Jehan Cnoop	1469	Burned in Bruges. de Bussere was a member of the local grocer's guild, owning a house near the city crane which was used for handling imported and exported goods.
Jeorge Vanden Damme	1469	Burned in Bruges. de Bussere was a member of the local grocer's guild, owning a house near the city crane which was used for handling imported and exported goods.
Jan van Lyere (Note: Thought to be Jan II van Lyere.)	1470 (Note: Actual date possibly 1463 based on outside records.)	Nobleman, burned in Antwerp for "committing inhuman and unnatural acts" with Gheert de Jonckhere, a furrier from Lier previously charged with molesting several boys; his properties, including the manor of Berchem, were confiscated by the bailiff.
Jehan Vanden Hauwe	1471 or 1472	A cleric (frère) and a layman, strangled as a "mercy" and burned.
Wouterkin le Dorpre	1471 or 1472	A cleric (frère) and a layman, strangled as a "mercy" and burned.
Hennen de Vos	1475	Wool weaver and carpet marker, burned at the Grand-Place in Brussels.
Jacques de Jonghe	1475	Painter, burned in Bruges for having relations with saddler Jehan Caudron and others while an apprentice of Reynault van Overtvelt 25 years earlier; Caudron briefly fled the city but later returned and was not charged.
Ampluenie Van Halle	19 November 1482	Burned in Bruges.
Unknown (Note: Jehan Betins' young wife.)	19 November 1482	Burned in Bruges.
Hester De Witte	19 November 1482	Burned in Bruges.
Lijsbet Vander Muelne	19 November 1482	Burned in Bruges.
Katheline Croux	19 November 1482	Burned in Bruges.
Katherine Ysenbaert	19 November 1482	Burned in Bruges.
Margriet Swulfs	18 August 1483	Burned in Bruges; would have been executed in November 1482 with aforementioned six women, but was spared after claiming pregnancy.
Jehan	1485	Greek, burned in Bruges for "several species of the sin of sodomy"; his partner, Hannekin Storm, was whipped with rods and his hair burned.
Corneille Vander Poorten	1494	Cook, beheaded at the Grand-Place in Tournai. Born in Brussels, he had lived in Rome for several years before moving to Antwerp and Bruges but did not hold employment long in either city. Poorten posted an anonymous pamphlet on the doors of the Bruges stock exchange accusing the entire city of sodomy, and fled to Tournai but was arrested there. He recanted the pamphlet's contents but admitted to abusing a calf as a teenager and having sex with several men in Rome, but he also recanted this at his execution.
Pieter Provincher	1507	Burned in Bruges after confessing to "having committed the 'horrible and abominable sin of sodomy with several persons.'"
Adriaen de Molde	1510	Burned in Leuven for "evil and filthy offenses." de Molde and Pauwels, a Pole from Gdańsk, met while in Montpellier and traveled together through the Duchy of Brabant, where Pauwels began his "dirty and dishonorable work against the will of Adriaen on several occasions"; de Molde, however, chose to remain in his company. They visited Gdańsk where Pauwels' parents gave them money with which they created fake mendicants' hoods and false ecclesiastical court licenses to travel freely. de Molde's father attempted to admit them into the Order of Paul of Thebes in Flanders, but their cover was blown and they were arrested in Leuven.
Pauwels	1510	
Pierkin de Rycke	13 May 1513	Burned in Bruges.
Jan Dekuenync	4 October 1516	Blacksmith and his apprentice, burned in Bruges.
Hannekin Alaerts	4 October 1516	Blacksmith and his apprentice, burned in Bruges.
Jan van Senct Gilles	1519	Nine members of a fifteen-man network, burned in Bruges. Three were arrested in Wezecappelle, after which the group was exposed. van Sanct Gilles, a 32-year-old vagabond, reported more than 30 others after his arrest but was still burned.
Eight unknowns	1519	Nine members of a fifteen-man network, burned in Bruges. Three were arrested in Wezecappelle, after which the group was exposed. van Sanct Gilles, a 32-year-old vagabond, reported more than 30 others after his arrest but was still burned.
Hannekin de Poortre	17 October 1522	Burned in Bruges. Described as a young boy from Antwerp, he admitted to multiple acts of sodomy as well as having "led three others into the sin." One boy he had made advances towards was flogged.
Jacques Kint	1523	Beheaded in Kortrijk.
Mathys Guser	1531 or 1532	Baker at a Dominican monastery, burned in Antwerp for "dirty affairs."
Cornelis van Woensdrecht	1532	Burned in Antwerp, his body was allowed to be buried in a cemetery "thanks to the plea of his friends."
Willem Vanden Berghe	21 November 1541	Burned outside of the city gates of Bruges with a sack of gunpowder on his chest to "speed his death"; his partner, Cornille Campus, was forced to watch before his hair was burned and he was banished for 50 years.
Hans van Hoey	1552	Beheaded in Zoutleeuw.
Jacomo dy Rossy	1557	Italian, beheaded in Antwerp.
Three unknowns	26 July 1578	Franciscan monks, strangled and burned in Bruges; 12 others were exiled, with five having their hair burned and being scourged.
Five unknowns	28 June 1578	Five monks (three Franciscans and two Augustinians) aged 17 to 20, burned in Ghent; two other 19-year-old Augustinians were banished from Ghent for three years. The mostly Catholic crowd at the execution "was awash in tears" and "even the Protestant preacher ... began to shout from the scaffold that the men were innocent," with all five protesting their innocence.
Arnould vanden Driesche	1592	Sentenced "for his enormous crimes," a lettre de remission was rejected by the Privy Council in Brussels, and he was subsequently tortured with a red-hot iron and burned in Oudenaarde.
Alexandro Lauro Palma	1605	Spanish, strangled and burned in Antwerp in 1605 for the "crime or sin of sodomy which is called the silent sin."
Jean de Nivelles	1608	Hanged in Antwerp, executed privately in prison due to his young age.
Niclaes Godtgast	21 August 1658	Burned outside of the city gates of Leuven. Coming to Leuven from Brussels, Leuven's aldermen were made aware of his arrival and arrested him on the road en route.

=== Denmark ===
Name	Date	Notes
Unknown	October 1628	Scottish lieutenant-colonel taken prisoner of war by Danish forces, burned in Copenhagen.
Unknown	November 1628	Scottish private taken prisoner of war by Danish forces, burned in Copenhagen.

=== England ===
The details of the accusation are often not given in contemporary sources, with euphemisms such as "unnatural offence" used. However, such terms were also used to describe bestiality, non-consensual acts, and crimes against minors. Due to this, sources discussing and listing capital offences for homosexuality, including the table below, may inadvertently include men executed for such offences.

Name	Date	Notes
Peter Chambers	5 October 1609	Catholic seminarian who converted to Protestantism, hanged in Exeter. He was convicted of sodomy with one of his choirboys at the Exeter assizes; he lived in Exeter Cathedral "to teach the singing boys" under Matthew Sutcliffe's sponsorship. Chambers protested at his execution that in Italy he was able to suppress his urges as a Catholic, but quickly relapsed in Protestantism.
Mervyn Tuchet	1631	2nd Earl of Castlehaven, executed for sodomy with his male servants and procuring the rape of his wife.
William Plaine	May 1646	67-year-old founder of Guilford, Connecticut, hanged in New Haven. Plaine, despite being married, had committed sodomy with "two persons in England" and had "corrupted a great part of the youth of Guilford." Charged with having "committed more than a hundred acts of pederastic molestation," multiple boys he was involved with were whipped for their participation.
John Knight	June 1655	Servant in the household of William Judson, hanged in New Haven. Executed for having sexual contact with 14-year-old Peter Vinson, an apprentice in the Judson household, he had been previously forced to "sit upon a gallows with a rope around his neck because he had behaved indecently with young girls." Vinson admitted to being a willing participant and was subsequently whipped, and Judson had to pay a "stiff fine" for attempting to conceal what had transpired.
Francis Dilly	4 February 1679	Non-white sailor on Jersey, executed as chief ringleader of a 4-man sodomite group at Port Royal. Other three members spared as they were white, "white men being scarce among us."
Unknown	September 1684	Young man, hanged in Portsmouth; name not recorded.
Four unknowns	1702	Four people hanged for sodomy at the Maidstone Assizes in Kent.
Oliver Jackson	22 August 1724	Hanged in the Kingston Hill Gallows in Kingston-Upon Thames.
William Griffin	9 May 1726	Griffin and Lawrence were 43 and Wright was 32. They were all convicted of sodomy after Thomas Newton, a 30 year old man they all had sexual relations with, gave over information about them to the authorities in exchange for immunity. Griffin, Lawrence and Wright were all hanged at Tyburn.
Gabriel Lawrence	9 May 1726	Griffin and Lawrence were 43 and Wright was 32. They were all convicted of sodomy after Thomas Newton, a 30 year old man they all had sexual relations with, gave over information about them to the authorities in exchange for immunity. Griffin, Lawrence and Wright were all hanged at Tyburn.
Thomas Wright	9 May 1726	Griffin and Lawrence were 43 and Wright was 32. They were all convicted of sodomy after Thomas Newton, a 30 year old man they all had sexual relations with, gave over information about them to the authorities in exchange for immunity. Griffin, Lawrence and Wright were all hanged at Tyburn.
James Hunt	25 August 1743	Hunt was a barge builder aged 37 and Collins was 57, a former weaver and soldier. They were accused of sodomy together in a toilet at Pepper Alley in Southwark, near London Bridge, which they each denied though their accounts differed. Their trial was at Surrey assizes 4 August and they were hanged at Kennington Common.
Thomas Collins	25 August 1743	Hunt was a barge builder aged 37 and Collins was 57, a former weaver and soldier. They were accused of sodomy together in a toilet at Pepper Alley in Southwark, near London Bridge, which they each denied though their accounts differed. Their trial was at Surrey assizes 4 August and they were hanged at Kennington Common.
Richard Arnold	15 September 1753	Arnold was around 60 and the landlord of the Lamb and Flag and Critchard was a footman aged around 20. They were convicted 31 August 1753 of felony and buggery for an act witnessed in the Swan Inn, Broad Street, Bristol. They were hanged together at St. Michael's Hill; they declined to implicate anyone else and Arnold was reported to have kissed Critchard's hand before the cart was pulled from under them.
William Critchard	15 September 1753	Arnold was around 60 and the landlord of the Lamb and Flag and Critchard was a footman aged around 20. They were convicted 31 August 1753 of felony and buggery for an act witnessed in the Swan Inn, Broad Street, Bristol. They were hanged together at St. Michael's Hill; they declined to implicate anyone else and Arnold was reported to have kissed Critchard's hand before the cart was pulled from under them.
Joseph Wright	15 August 1755	Trial at Coventry assizes. Hanged on Whitley Common. Wright admitted that he had been guilty of sodomy, but never with Grimes, while Grimes said that he had never committed any such offence. Wright was also found guilty of killing Mr. Warner of Winhall.
Thomas Grimes	15 August 1755	Trial at Coventry assizes. Hanged on Whitley Common. Wright admitted that he had been guilty of sodomy, but never with Grimes, while Grimes said that he had never committed any such offence. Wright was also found guilty of killing Mr. Warner of Winhall.
Richard Whatley	23 March 1776	Trial at Hampshire assizes 5 March. Whatley, aged 41 and also known as Richard Churchill, was convicted of sodomy against Benjamin Dupre, a coachman employed by Lovell Stanhope. He admitted that he had attempted the offence (which took place at Avington), but had not actually committed it.
Benjamin Loveday	12 October 1781	Trial at Bristol assizes. Hanged on St Michael's Hill. Loveday worked as a waiter before keeping a public house on Tower Street, Bristol while Burke was a midshipman, and they were accused of sexual activity together that they denied. Loveday was also accused by James Morgan. Joseph Giles and James Lane were also accused with Loveday, but were only sentenced for misdemeanours, and William Ward was acquitted. Loveday may have been running a molly house.
John Burke	12 October 1781	Trial at Bristol assizes. Hanged on St Michael's Hill. Loveday worked as a waiter before keeping a public house on Tower Street, Bristol while Burke was a midshipman, and they were accused of sexual activity together that they denied. Loveday was also accused by James Morgan. Joseph Giles and James Lane were also accused with Loveday, but were only sentenced for misdemeanours, and William Ward was acquitted. Loveday may have been running a molly house.
John Lad or Ladd (one source says Thomas)	10 April 1786	A Methodist preacher, he was tried at Surrey assizes on 22 March and taken from New Gaol to be hanged on Peckham Common.
Thomas Crispin	17 August 1787	Trial at Devon assizes 30 July. Hanged at Heavitree gallows near Exeter. Crispin, aged 45, was a potter from Pilton who had been living in a workhouse for seven years. His co-accused Hugh Gribble was reprieved owing to mental incapacity. Crispin acknowledged his guilt but showed no remorse.
John Southwell	3 April 1790	Trial at Suffolk assizes in Bury 17 March. Hanged at Rushmere Heath.
John Smith	3 April 1790	Trial at Suffolk assizes in Bury 17 March. Hanged at Rushmere Heath.
Henry Allen	1797	Captain of the sloop Rattler, hanged for sodomy on the ships' yardarm "despite his rank and excellent social connections."
William Powell	30 August 1797	Powell was a pauper at Melford workhouse. His trial was at Suffolk assizes on 9 August. He was hanged at Bury St Edmunds at the age of 70, but he did not confess.
Joseph Bird	26 August 1803	Trial at Warwickshire assizes, executed in Warwick. Bird was a Methodist, convicted on the testimony of John Privett. Privett withdrew his statement, only to then say this was because Bird's son bribed him.
Mathuselah Spalding aka Methuselah	8 February 1804	His trial was at the Old Bailey in November, where he was convicted of having "a venereal affair" with James Hankinson. He was hanged at Newgate. He was hanged with a forger, Ann Hurle - they were led out of Debtor's Door and rather than the New Drop they were hanged by a cart being driven from under them.
David Robertson	13 August 1806	Trial at the Old Bailey and executed at Newgate after attempting suicide. Robertson was 48 years old and said to keep a brothel at Charles Street, Covent Garden. He was convicted of an offence with 17-year-old George Foulston.
James Stockton aka Samuel Stockton	13 September 1806	Known as the Remarkable Trials, twenty seven men aged 17 to 84 from in and around Warrington, Manchester, and Liverpool were arrested in May 1806 for sodomy and nine were tried by John Borron and Richard Gwillym at the Lancaster assizes. Harry Cocks notes that the arrests came amid concerns post-1789 about Jacobins and other men meeting in private. Men of different social classes, they met among other places on Mondays and Fridays at Hitchin's house in Great Sankey, Cheshire, and were said by the press to be Freemasons and call each other "brother". Holland was a rich pawnbroker and there were rumours that members of the gentry were involved with the group, even members of Parliament. Those hanged were convicted on the testimonies of John Knight and Thomas Taylor, members of the group who gave evidence to avoid being hanged themselves. Rix also testified that sodomy was widespread and considered normal in Warrington, Manchester, and Liverpool, describing casual encounters in the street, but the magistrate refused a deal, while Hitchin denied the charges. Stockton, Holland and Powell were hanged at Lancaster castle on 13 September, and Hitchin and Rix later that month after they were further interrogated to find other conspirators. Joshua Newsom and George Ellis were found guilty of lesser offences and the rest were acquitted. The magistrates attempted to investigate further, but were stopped by the Home Office.
Joseph Holland	13 September 1806	
John Powell	13 September 1806	
Isaac Hitchin	27 September 1806	Part of the "Remarkable Trials."
Thomas Rix	27 September 1806	Part of the "Remarkable Trials."
William Billey	31 March 1808	Aged 45, he was accused of an offence against Thomas Douglas of Crayford and for attempted offences against others. His trial was at Kent Lent Assizes in Maidstone, and he was hanged on Penenden Heath. He had no family and the Kentish Gazette said he "appeared a perfect idiot".
Richard Neighbour	24 November 1808	Neighbour of Gresse Street, Rathbone Place, aged 26, was convicted of a crime against the body of Joshua Archer, aged 17 or 18, an apprentice to an engraver. Attempts were made to bribe Archer to leave the country. Neighbour was sentenced to hang at the Old Bailey in October 1808, but he poisoned himself with arsenic at Newgate the next month, less than a week before his execution was due.
James Bartlett	4 April 1809	Trial at Surrey Assizes, executed at Horsemonger Lane Gaol. He was buried at Limehouse and left £1,500 to his daughter.
Samuel Mounser	31 August 1810	Trial at the Chelmsford Summer Assizes, from Stanford-le-Hope.
Thomas White	7 March 1811	Main article: Vere Street Coterie Ensign John Newball Hepburn, in his forties, and Drummer Thomas White, 16, tried at the Old Bailey and hanged in front of Newgate Prison, London
John Hepburn	7 March 1811	Main article: Vere Street Coterie Ensign John Newball Hepburn, in his forties, and Drummer Thomas White, 16, tried at the Old Bailey and hanged in front of Newgate Prison, London
David Thompson Myers	4 May 1812	Myers was a draper of Stamford, accused by Thomas Crow (or Crowe), an 18-year-old apprentice to a tailor, Mr. Horden of Stamford. Myers was acquitted in Lincolnshire due to Crow being suspected of lying, but he was then convicted at trial at Peterborough accused again by Crow of offences at Burghley Park. Myers was hanged at Fengate, Peterborough, the last man to be publicly executed in the city.
George Godfrey	1 April 1813	Godfrey was a butler in the house of Mr. Atkinson at Lee, who was indicted for "unnatural offences" with a footman, Henry Greenhurst, from May to December 1812. The latter was "unconscious of the heinous character of the offence" and told another servant, who informed Mr. Atkinson. Godfrey was hanged at Penenden Heath.
Henry Youens	18 August 1814	Trial at the Kent Assizes in Maidstone, hanged at Penenden Heath. Ottaway, 33, and Youens, 21, were soldiers.
John Ottaway (spelled variously Ottoway, Otooway, Ottway, and Otway)	18 August 1814	Trial at the Kent Assizes in Maidstone, hanged at Penenden Heath. Ottaway, 33, and Youens, 21, were soldiers.
Abraham Adams	26 July 1815	Trial at the Old Bailey, hanged aged 51 at Newgate alongside Elizabeth Fenning.
John Charles	1 February 1816	Sailors on HMS Africaine under captain Edward Rodney, hanged at Portsmouth at 11 AM. Two other men, John Parsons and Joseph Hubbard, were whipped, with Hubbard receiving fewer lashes than Parsons due to medical concerns. Many reports of sodomy surfaced onboard the ship during its four-year tour of the East Indies, with Westerman being named as a participant from the start. For the first incident, Westerman was demoted from captain's servant boy to ordinary crewman, with further demotion for a later incident. More incidents surfaced until the ship returned to England in 1815, and an investigation was ordered by the Royal Navy. The initial 23 suspects identified in December 1815 was reduced to just four (Westerman, Joseph Tall, Seraco, and Treake). The origins of the sodomy amongst the crew was determined to be Seraco and Treake, both Italians. Seraco was condemned with Charles (a prisoner), Treake was initially pardoned with Joseph Tall but re-condemned with Westerman.
Raphael Seraco (Note: Also named Ralph Serraco)	1 February 1816	
Raphael Treake (Note: Also named Raphaelo Troyac)	1 February 1816	
John Westerman	1 February 1816	
George Siggins	21 August 1817	Trial at Kent Assizes in Maidstone for a crime in Chatham, executed on Penenden Heath.
Joseph Charlton	14 April 1819	A watchmaker aged 26 who was tried at the Guildhall, Newcastle and hanged at Morpeth. His funeral was attended by 2000 people.
John Markham	29 December 1819	A pauper aged 26 who was an inmate at St. Giles's workhouse, his hanging was heard by John Cam Hobhouse, who was being held at Newgate. Hobhouse noted in his diary, "Tis dreadful hanging a man for this practice".
Thomas Foster	3 May 1820	Trial at Kent Assizes and hanged at Penenden Heath. Convicted of an offence with John Whyneard (charged as an accomplice, but not hanged) at the Isle of Sheppey.
John Holland	25 November 1822	Aged 42 and 32 respectively, tried at the Old Bailey and executed at Newgate.
William King	25 November 1822	Aged 42 and 32 respectively, tried at the Old Bailey and executed at Newgate.
William Arden	21 March 1823	Respectively a gentleman and half-pay officer aged 35, a valet to the Duke of Newcastle aged 36, and a cabinet maker aged 35, they were tried at Lincoln Assizes by Mr. Justice Park and convicted on the evidence of a 19-year-old apprentice draper named Henry Hackett. A love letter from Hackett to Candler had been addressed to the Duke to save on postage: the Duke received and read the letter and had Hackett confronted, upon which he also implicated Doughty and Arden, who had associated with each other in Grantham in summer 1822. They were part of a group of up to 36 men led by Arden, who went on hunger strike in jail. The convicted men were hanged at Lincoln Castle.
Benjamin Candler	21 March 1823	
John Doughty	21 March 1823	
Charles Clutton	13 August 1824	Aged 25, he was charged in June 1824 with Charles Paul, aged 17, for an offence at Weedon Bec barracks in May 1823 - they were both privates in the 53rd regiment. He was sentenced by Mr. Justice Holroyd and hanged at the New Drop, Northamptonshire.
Joseph Bennett	20 April 1825	Aged about 30 and from Witney and aged 22 and from Radstock, respectively, they were hanged at Ilchester Gaol in Somerset.
George Maggs	20 April 1825	Aged about 30 and from Witney and aged 22 and from Radstock, respectively, they were hanged at Ilchester Gaol in Somerset.
Captain Henry Nicholl (also reported as Nichol and Nicholls)	12 August 1833	A 50-year-old veteran of the Peninsular War, Nicholl was hanged at Horsemonger Lane Gaol in Southwark, London. He was renounced by his prominent family, and his body was handed over to a hospital for dissection as they refused to accept it for burial.
George Cropper	26 December 1833	A 26-year-old soldier, he was convicted of an offence at Deptford with a fellow soldier, Charles Pike, who was aged 18, but Pike was acquitted. Cropper was hanged at New Sessions House in Maidstone, the same day as a rapist.
John Spershott (also reported as John Sparshott and John Sparsholt)	22 August 1835	A labourer aged 19, he was convicted of an offence with 8-year-old George Howard (who was not charged) at Mid Lavant and hanged at Horsham, Surrey, alongside a burglar. "Spershott's hanging was perhaps the last occasion at which was performed the folk ritual of the hangman passing the dead man's hands over the neck and bosoms of young women as a cure for glandular enlargements."
John Smith	27 November 1835	The last two men to be hanged for homosexuality in England, hanged at Newgate Prison in London.
James Pratt	27 November 1835	The last two men to be hanged for homosexuality in England, hanged at Newgate Prison in London.

=== France ===
Name	Date	Notes
Robert de Peronne	1317	Also known as de Bray, burned in Laon; brother Jean given unknown sentence for same charge the next year.
Pierre Poirer	1334	Burned in Dorche.
Unknown	1344	Burned at Dorche, Savoy.
Unknown	1372	Burned at Reims.
Hannen le Sot	1381 or 1382	Burned at Valenciennes, executed privately "for the grace he possessed."
Johannes Rorer	1400	Bathhouse owner, burned in Strasbourg; his partner, carpenter Heinzmann Hiltebrant, fled the city.
Isaach Salamó	1403	Jew, burned in Perpignan.
Gilles de Nevers	1457	"Host of the golden head", burned in Lille.
Two unknowns	12 July 1459	A man in his fifties and a young tambourine player, burned in Lille.
Unknown	16 March 1460	Burned in Lille. Claimed to be both a man and woman, however judges decided they were a cross-dressing man "who disguised (themselves) as a woman to have sex with several young men" rather than a hermaphrodite.
Eighteen unknowns	24 December 1474	Lombard soldiers, executed in Burgundy.
Jerome	1506	A bottlemaker and Jerome, burned in Strasbourg.
Unknown	1506	A bottlemaker and Jerome, burned in Strasbourg.
Jean Moret	13 December 1519	Burned alive in Amiens, sentenced by city bailiff.
Unknown	1535	A woman from Fontaines who dressed as a man and married a maid of Foy; burned, case reported by Henri Estienne.
Dominique Phinot	1556	Composer of the Renaissance, executed in Lyon.
Unknown	1557	Pronotary of Montault, sentenced to be burned.
Marie	1580	Female weaver in Montier-en-Der, born in Chaumont; dressed as a man, married another woman, and used "illicit devices"; hanged.
Nicolas Dadon	1 February 1584	Rector of the University of Paris, from Nulli Saint-Front, hanged and burned (along with his trial) for sodomy in Paris.
Unknown	April 1584	Italian, burned alive in front of the Louvre in Paris.
Richard Renvoisy	6 March 1586	Canon of Sainte-Chapelle du Roi in Dijon and "master of children", wrote Quelques odes d'Anacreon mises en musique in 1559. His "too free association with his young students made him fall into a crime", and he was subsequently burned.
Ruffin "Defrozieres" Fortias (Note: Also given as "Rozieres")	22 December 1598	Hanged and body burned in Issoudun. Sentenced by bailiwick on 28 November.
Jean-Imbert Brunet	4 May 1601	Local priest of Ollioules, burned by the Parliament of Provence.
Unknown	7 March 1654	Italian priest accused of sodomy, one of three tortured prisoners. He, "having confessed by all rigorosity (sic) of his pains, was condemned to be first hanged, and afterwards burnt - a sentence carried out the next day" in Paris.
Jacques Chausson	1661	Burned for the attempted rape of a young nobleman, Octave des Valons.
Emery Ange Dugaton	1666	Burned in Paris.
Antoine Mazouer	1666	Burned in Paris.
Antoine Bouquet	26 August 1671	Sentenced to burn alive.
Unknown	31 March 1677	60-year-old, burned in the Marché-Neuf in Paris. Sentenced earlier that day.
Philippe Basse	1720	Burned in Paris, also convicted of blasphemy.
Bernard Mocmanesse	1720	Burned in Paris, also convicted of blasphemy.
Benjamin Deschauffours	1726	Procurer, burned on Place de Grève in Paris. Accused of killing a kidnapped boy.
Two unknowns	1745	Former associates of the bandit Raffiat, who was broken on the wheel in 1742. They were pierced in their tongues, hanged and burned; they were also charged with blasphemy.
Jean Diot	6 July 1750	Strangled and burned in Paris; last executions for sodomy in France.
Bruno Lenoir	6 July 1750	Strangled and burned in Paris; last executions for sodomy in France.
Jean-Baptiste Marchal	3 October 1757	Parish priest of Ludres, condemned to be burned by the sovereign court of Lorraine; made an edifying speech to his parishioners speech before he was executed, and organized pilgrimages were made to the execution site afterwards.

=== Germany ===
Name	Date	Notes
Heinrich Schreiber	1378	Convicted by a Munich civil court, probably executed.
Br. Hans Storzl	1381	Two monks, two Beghards, and a peasant, burned in Augsburg for "having committed heresy with one another."
Br. Eberhard of St. Lienhart	1381	Two monks, two Beghards, and a peasant, burned in Augsburg for "having committed heresy with one another."
Three unknowns	1381	Two monks, two Beghards, and a peasant, burned in Augsburg for "having committed heresy with one another."
Ulrich Frey	1408 or 1409	From Augsburg; one burned, other 4 (all ecclesiastics) bound hand and foot in a wooden cage to starve.
Jacob Kyss	1408 or 1409	From Augsburg; one burned, other 4 (all ecclesiastics) bound hand and foot in a wooden cage to starve.
Ulrich	1408 or 1409	From Augsburg; one burned, other 4 (all ecclesiastics) bound hand and foot in a wooden cage to starve.
Two unknowns	1408 or 1409	From Augsburg; one burned, other 4 (all ecclesiastics) bound hand and foot in a wooden cage to starve.
Two unknowns	1418	Clerics, convicted to burn in Konstanz; probably executed.
Br. Conradt	1464	Burned in Konstanz.
Ulrich Vischer	1464	Burned in Konstanz.
Georg Semler	1471	Three artisans and a merchant, decapitated in Regensburg.
Fritz Rottel	1471	Three artisans and a merchant, decapitated in Regensburg.
Stefan Karl	1471	Three artisans and a merchant, decapitated in Regensburg.
Andre Vetter	1471	Three artisans and a merchant, decapitated in Regensburg.
Katherina Hetzeldorfer	1477	German cross-dressing lesbian executed for heresy against nature after having used a dildo on two female partners.
Cristan Schriber	1488	Burned in Konstanz.
Jacob Miller	1532	Decapitated in Augsburg. Miller claimed his same-sex relations were simply from his wife having been sick for 10 years, and Will had previously been married to and had several children with an artisan's widow while still having same-sex relations. Wagner was caught giving Will a jacket and a rapier "as an outward sign of their connection."
Bernhard/Berlin Wagner	1532	Decapitated in Augsburg. Miller claimed his same-sex relations were simply from his wife having been sick for 10 years, and Will had previously been married to and had several children with an artisan's widow while still having same-sex relations. Wagner was caught giving Will a jacket and a rapier "as an outward sign of their connection."
Michel Will	1532	Decapitated in Augsburg. Miller claimed his same-sex relations were simply from his wife having been sick for 10 years, and Will had previously been married to and had several children with an artisan's widow while still having same-sex relations. Wagner was caught giving Will a jacket and a rapier "as an outward sign of their connection."
Franz von Alsten	1536 or 1537	Decapitated in Münster.
Christopher Mayer	13 August 1594	Mayer, a weaver of fustian, and Weber, a fruiterer, both citizens of Nuremberg, committed sodomy together for 3 years until they were spotted in the act behind a hedge by a hook-maker's apprentice. Weber had also committed sodomy with Endressen, a cook, an Alexander, and others over the past 20 years. Mayer was beheaded, and his body was burnt with Weber as he was burned alive.
Hans Weber	13 August 1594	Mayer, a weaver of fustian, and Weber, a fruiterer, both citizens of Nuremberg, committed sodomy together for 3 years until they were spotted in the act behind a hedge by a hook-maker's apprentice. Weber had also committed sodomy with Endressen, a cook, an Alexander, and others over the past 20 years. Mayer was beheaded, and his body was burnt with Weber as he was burned alive.
Hans Wolff Marti	11 March 1596	Marti, a tradesman, citizen of Wehr, had committed sodomy in various places and times, including first with a bargeman at Ibss, with another partner at Brauningen, and with a peasant at Miltenburck. Beheaded with the sword "as a favour" before his body was burned.
Ludwig le Gros	15 June 1704	Prussian soldiers, beheaded in Berlin after confessing to having sexual relations with each other under Charles V's code of 1532 which criminalized sodomy.
Martin Schultze	15 June 1704	Prussian soldiers, beheaded in Berlin after confessing to having sexual relations with each other under Charles V's code of 1532 which criminalized sodomy.
Catharina Margaretha Linck	1721	Prussian cross-dressing lesbian executed for sodomy in Halberstadt; her execution was the last for lesbian sexual activity in Europe.
Ephraim Ostermann	31 January 1729	Baker, age 30. Arrested for two sexual acts with his apprentice, Martin Köhler, who allegedly died of "unnatural loss of semen". Admitted under torture to similar acts on 20 other men. Beheaded in Potsdam under the court of Friedrich Wilhelm I.

After the Nazi takeover in 1933, the persecution of homosexuals in Germany became a priority of the Nazi police state. Between 1933 and 1945, an estimated 100,000 men were arrested as homosexuals; ten thousands of which were sentenced by courts. Most of these men served time in regular prisons, and between 5,000 and 6,000 were imprisoned in concentration camps. The death rate of these prisoners has been estimated at 60 percent, a higher rate than those of other prisoner groups. A smaller number of men were sentenced to death or killed at Nazi euthanasia centres. After the war, homosexuals were initially not counted as victims of Nazism because homosexuality continued to be illegal in Nazi Germany's successor states.

=== Ireland ===
Name	Date	Notes
John Atherton	5 December 1640	Bishop of Waterford and Lismore and his tithe proctor, hanged in Waterford. They were convicted under a law Atherton had voiced support for.
John Childe	5 December 1640	Bishop of Waterford and Lismore and his tithe proctor, hanged in Waterford. They were convicted under a law Atherton had voiced support for.

=== Italy ===
Name	Date	Notes
Niger de Pulis	1287	Burned in Parma.
Adenolfo IV	13 July 1293	Count of Acerra, impaled in Perugia by Charles II of Anjou.
Agostino di Ercole	1348	Likely executed in Florence. He did not believe his crime was serious and felt that if he was worthy of death, "then many others were to be considered worthy of death".
Pietro di Ferrara	20 February 1349	Servant, burned in Venice. Tried and convicted by the Lords of the Night along with fellow servant Giacomello di Bologna on 29 December 1348, who was only banished as he did not confess.
Rolandina Roncaglia	20 March 1354	Transgender female prostitute, burned in Venice. Originally from Padua, prior to presenting as female she was sometimes mistaken for a woman because of her feminine mannerisms. Initially married to a woman, but later had sex with a man and began presenting as female before moving to Venice. Sold eggs by day and sexual favors by night; most clients did not know of Roncaglia's sex, but per her account no one in Venice objected to her transitioning. Worked for 7 years before she was reported by a client and arrested.
Nicoleto Marmagna	3 October 1357	Boatman and his servant, burned in Venice by the Lords of Night. Marmagna was married to Braganza's sister.
Giovanni Braganza	3 October 1357	Boatman and his servant, burned in Venice by the Lords of Night. Marmagna was married to Braganza's sister.
Giovanni di Giovanni	7 May 1365	15-year-old boy charged with being "a public and notorious passive sodomite".
Nanni di Firenze	27 July 1401	Likely burned in Venice.
Nani Silvestri	20 December 1401	Merchant, likely burned in Venice.
Domenico da Fermo	3 January 1402	Barber, burned in Venice. Resisted interrogative torture, refusing to and retracting any given confessions.
Clario Contarini	1407	A group of young nobles and clerics, burned in Venice. From a group of 35, including 14 nobles, tried by the Council of Ten; scandal ensued due to the backgrounds of the accused.
Fifteen or sixteen unknowns	1407	A group of young nobles and clerics, burned in Venice. From a group of 35, including 14 nobles, tried by the Council of Ten; scandal ensued due to the backgrounds of the accused.
Domenico di Giovanni	29 July 1420	Decapitated in Florence.
Alvisio	1421	Burned in Piazza del Mercato, Bologna.
Francesco Guglielmi	1422	Burned in Piazza del Mercato, Bologna. Guglielmi's house in Valdonica was also burned and his heirs' property was confiscated.
Stefano da Prato	1422	Burned in Piazza del Mercato, Bologna. Guglielmi's house in Valdonica was also burned and his heirs' property was confiscated.
Francesco Mancini	1 December 1423	Sicilian university law professor and his servant, beheaded in Piazza del Comune, Bologna.
Antonio Micileto	1 December 1423	Sicilian university law professor and his servant, beheaded in Piazza del Comune, Bologna.
Antonio d'Ugolino	9 May 1443	From S. Michele di Mugello, hanged and burned in Florence. Buried in the temple.
Simon Barbiere Bizzello	28 May 1443 or 20 May 1444	Decapitated in Florence.
Mafeo Barbaro	1464	Beheaded and burned in Venice. Their younger (puer) companions, Giovanni Basadona and Giovanni Filippo Priuli, were both exiled for 8 years.
Ermolao Foscari	1464	Beheaded and burned in Venice. Their younger (puer) companions, Giovanni Basadona and Giovanni Filippo Priuli, were both exiled for 8 years.
Antonio di Giovanni Pucca	17 April 1469	Beccamorto, decapitated in Florence.
Padano d'Otranto	1474	Beheaded and burned together in Piazza San Marco, Venice, by the Council of Ten. Two from a group of six tried by the Council, and the only ones executed due to their active status; the others received lesser punishments.
Marino Alegeti	1474	Beheaded and burned together in Piazza San Marco, Venice, by the Council of Ten. Two from a group of six tried by the Council, and the only ones executed due to their active status; the others received lesser punishments.
Marco Baffo	11 September 1476	Hanged in Venice by the Council of Ten. Baffo was married to the daughter of Piramo da Veglia.
Francesco Toniuti	11 September 1476	Hanged in Venice by the Council of Ten. Baffo was married to the daughter of Piramo da Veglia.
Francesco Cercato	1480	Hanged between the columns of a square in Venice.
Marco Baffo	1485	Hanged in Venice.
Unknown	1490s	17-year-old hanged in Ferrara.
Geronimo	15 March 1504	Burned in the public square of Vastato, Genoa.
Giovanni di Piero Masini	25 August 1514	Baker's boy, hanged and burned in the courtyard of the Bargello.
Unknown	1540	Executed in Bologna.
Unknown	1541	Executed in Bologna.
Francesco Fabrizio	1545	Priest of San Giuliano and poet, decapitated and burned by the Council of Ten.
Two unknowns	1547	Executed (one hanged and burned, the other quartered) in Bologna.
Unknown	1549	Hanged and burned in Bologna.
Jacopo Bonfadio	19 July 1550	Humanist and historian, beheaded and burnt in Genoa.
Francesco Calcagno	23 December 1550	Franciscan friar (laicized and expelled), executed in Venice.
Antonio di Giovanni Bandoni	24 October 1551	Hanged and burned (or quartered) in Florence.
Grazia di Negroponte	15 June 1553	Turkish footman; strangled and burned in Pratello, Florence. Converted to Christianity nine months prior. Buried in the temple.
Messer Rinieri	25 September 1556	56-year-old cathedral canon and man of letters from the Franchi family, hanged and burned in Perugia by Sixtus V for "having repeatedly scaled the walls of the seminary of said Perugia, on behalf of sodomy."
Gabriele Thomaein	17 February 1559	German from Augsburg, burned in Rome with 3 heretics.
Baptistam Bariliarum	11 October 1561	Decapitated on a high platform between two columns and burned in Venice.
Paseto Portador	12 December 1562	Decapitated on a high platform between two columns in Piazza di San Marco, Venice, and burned; also convicted of homicide.
Nicola da Germinà	12 July 1565	Burned in Bargello, Milan.
Ambrogio di Croce	8 April 1566	Hanged and burned in Milan.
Unknown	July 1566	Young man burned on a bridge in Rome.
Giuseppe D'Angelo	18 December 1566	From Monte di Trapani (Erice), hanged and burned in Palermo.
Cornelio Mantovani	1567	Policeman, burned in Bologna.
Cosimo la Mirabella	13 June 1567	Hanged and burned in Palermo.
Santoni Giuliano	13 June 1567	Hanged and burned in Palermo.
Bernardino di Marsala	8 October 1567	Hanged and burned in Palermo.
Nico	2 December 1567	Becher, beheaded and burned between the two columns of San Zulian, Venice; convicted of sodomy "among other faults", which we were read alound from a platform over the Grand Canal.
Sebastiano Vita	20 February 1568	Executed and burned in Palermo.
Unknown	21 August 1568	Young man burned in Rome; many "false doors" were ordered closed that night.
Valerio	1570	Hanged in Bologna. Surname not reported.
Luigi Fontino	March 1570	Musician and canon of the Basilica of Nostra Signora di Loreto, laicizied and beheaded in Loreto for relations with a student of his, 16-year-old Luigi Dalla Balla. Giovanni Leonardo Primavera, another lover of Dalla Balla, escaped persecution in 1585.
Cosimo la Piccola	23 June 1570	Strangled and burned in Palermo.
Francesco la Motta	7 May 1573	Strangled and burned in Palermo.
Simone Micara	7 May 1573	Strangled and burned in Palermo.
Melchiorre di Trapani	24 November 1574	Strangled and burned in Palermo.
Unknown	25 June 1576	From Pesaro, hanged and burned in Milan.
Battista	August 1578	From a group of eleven, mostly Portuguese and Spanish, who were arrested after organizing a same-sex marriage ceremony, burned in Rome: Battista, an Albanian boatman.; de Vélez, a Catalan.; Herrera, from Toledo.; de Alfar, from Seville.; de Robles, from Madrid.; Pinto, from Viana do Alentejo.; de Paz, from Toledo.; de Martín, from Vitória.; The intended wedding was between de Martín and a Portuguese monk, Brother Giuseppe, and the group congregated at Basilica di San Giovanni a Porta Latina near Pinto's residence on 20 July 1578 as planned; however, Giuseppe fell ill and could not come, and the group spent the day together regardless but were arrested that afternoon. The group had 27 total members, but only 11 were present. Within the group, de Alfar and de Robles were known to be involved with each other, but de Robles was also involved with Battista and the two had a long-term relationship. Both had previously lived in Flanders in the 1560s, where they worked as a tavern keeper and shipbuilder respectively. Robles saved Battista from being burned after he was denounced twice, after which they fled the region. de Robles had married while in Flanders, and he asked the Confraternity of San Giovanni Decollato to send his wife there a letter.
Antonio de Vélez	August 1578	
Francisco Hererra	August 1578	
Bernardino de Alfar	August 1578	
Alfonso de Robles	August 1578	
Marcos Pinto	August 1578	
Jerómino de Paz	August 1578	
Gaspar de Martín	August 1578	
Luciano lo Terrosi	19 November 1578	Strangled and burned in Palermo.
Giovanni di Bella	4 December 1578	Hanged and burned in Palermo.
Giuseppe Benanti	15 May 1579	Strangled in Palermo; also executed was Giacopo (or Giacomo) di Giacopo, who made false allegations against Giuseppe de Marino in another sodomy trial.
D. Carlo Barone	3 August 1579	Executed (Barone unknown, Bevaceto beheaded, Russitano and Scolaro strangled) and burned in Palermo. The father of D. Pietro Vinacito paid the court 15,000 scudi to spare the men, but the executions were still carried out.
Don Paolo Bevaceto	3 August 1579	Executed (Barone unknown, Bevaceto beheaded, Russitano and Scolaro strangled) and burned in Palermo. The father of D. Pietro Vinacito paid the court 15,000 scudi to spare the men, but the executions were still carried out.
Giacomo Russitano	3 August 1579	Executed (Barone unknown, Bevaceto beheaded, Russitano and Scolaro strangled) and burned in Palermo. The father of D. Pietro Vinacito paid the court 15,000 scudi to spare the men, but the executions were still carried out.
Antonio Scolaro	3 August 1579	Executed (Barone unknown, Bevaceto beheaded, Russitano and Scolaro strangled) and burned in Palermo. The father of D. Pietro Vinacito paid the court 15,000 scudi to spare the men, but the executions were still carried out.
Prospero Magri	11 April 1580	Strangled in Palermo.
Giovanni Bentivoglio	29 July 1580	Hanged and burned in Palermo.
Fabrizio Lisci	29 July 1580	Hanged and burned in Palermo.
Matteo Paladino	25 August 1581	Brigand, strangled and burned in Palermo.
Geronimo Galesi	19 November 1582	Hanged and burned in Palermo.
Pietro d'Olieri	19 November 1582	Hanged and burned in Palermo.
Innocenzo Bonamico	2 May 1583	Hanged and burned in Palermo.
Muscato	2 May 1583	Hanged and burned in Palermo.
Antonino Polito	18 May 1583	Hanged and burned in Palermo. Also convicted of country theft.
Lazzarino Almirotto	14 January 1584	Hanged and burned in Palermo.
Giovanni Borgognone	29 November 1584	Executioner, burned outside of Porta Ticinese, Milan.
Giuseppe Serio	29 May 1585	Hanged and burned in Palermo for relations with two young beardless men.
Vincenzo Malatesta	25 June 1585	Hanged and burned in Palermo.
Leonardo d'Amadeo	2 December 1585	Hanged and burned in Palermo.
Unknown	9 May 1586	20-year-old pedant (teacher) from Ponticelo, hanged in the Archi and burned in Genoa; tried along with another teacher who was also sentenced to death but it is unknown if he too was executed.
G. Battista Inbrunetta	26 April 1586	Hanged and burned in Palermo.
Two unknowns	June 1586	Priest and boy, both burned in Rome even though they had both voluntarily confessed.
Andrea li Sarti	17 June 1586	Hanged and burned in Palermo.
Scipione di Nicolò	11 July 1586	Hanged and burned in Palermo for relations with two clean-shaven young men.
Aurelio Ciafaglione	23 December 1586	Hanged and burned in Palermo for relations with a young beardless man.
Girolamo Incudina	2 January 1587	Body quartered and displayed in the streets of Palermo. Also convicted of theft and murder.
Francesco Carlini	1588	Hanged and burned in Bologna. Also convicted of theft and heresy.
Giuseppe Magliocco	7 January 1588	Hanged and burned in Palermo.
Don Vincenzo Alteato	14 November 1589	Burned outside Porta Ticinese, Milan; buried in S. Giovanni.
Giovanni Mazzone	1 February 1590	Hanged in Palermo.
Bernardino di Camillo	1592	Hanged together in Ponte, Rome, after being led through the city.
Muzio di Senso	1592	Hanged together in Ponte, Rome, after being led through the city.
Ottaviano Bargellini	1593	A member of a senatorial family (Bargellini) and a Jew (Orsini), beheaded together in Bologna. Orsini converted to Christianity before the execution as Paolo and his body was displayed in Piazza Maggiore.
Allegro Orsini	1593	A member of a senatorial family (Bargellini) and a Jew (Orsini), beheaded together in Bologna. Orsini converted to Christianity before the execution as Paolo and his body was displayed in Piazza Maggiore.
Antonio d'Assena	24 March 1593	Hanged and burned in Palermo.
Two unknowns	23 May 1593	Likely hanged and burned after a long trial in Bologna.
Andria Badulato	24 November 1593	Hanged in Palermo.
Ioanni Costa	1 June 1594	Hanged in Palermo.
Leonardo Cortese	30 August 1594	Hanged and burned in Palermo.
Mariano Pignataro	22 April 1598	Choked and burned in Palermo.
Mario di Croce	18 January 1599	Partner of nobleman Francesco Sessa, hanged and burned in Milan.
Giovanni Batta Aricardi	3 April 1599	Weaver, partner of nobleman Francesco Sessa, hanged and burned in Milan.
Paolo Ferrare	27 July 1599	Hanged and burned in Palermo.
Ausebio Bonhomo	13 August 1599	From Nicosia, hanged and burned in Piano di S. Erasmo, Palermo.
Alessandro Cabiate	14 August 1599	Partner of nobleman Francesco Sessa, hanged and burned in Milan.
Petro "Haro" Curchio	22 March 1601	Choked on a stake and burned in Palermo.
Domenico Galletti	12 September 1601	Strangled and burned on Piano di S. Erasmo, Palermo.
Francesco Cappadona	28 September 1601	Hanged and burned in Palermo.
Mustafà Giorgio	4 June 1602	Turkish slave of the Duchess of Maqueda and a Spanish soldier in the company of D. Ernando di Gusman, hanged in Palermo.
Petro Scudero	4 June 1602	Turkish slave of the Duchess of Maqueda and a Spanish soldier in the company of D. Ernando di Gusman, hanged in Palermo.
Francesco La Barbara	12 June 1602	Strangled and burned on Piano della Marina, Palermo.
Bartolo di Bernabeo Aquilanti	27 August 1602	Hanged for "pimping sodomy" in Florence.
Minico la Sola	20 June 1603	From Partanna, hanged in Palermo.
Paulu Simonetto	19 April 1606	Hanged in Palermo.
Giovanni Maria Bonfiglioli	1607	Hanged and burned in Bologna.
Giovanni Garsè	21 February 1607	Hanged and burned in Palermo.
Sebastiano/Vespasiano Spalletta	26 March 1607	Hanged in Palermo.
Giuseppe di Tommaso	27 November 1607	From Castello a Mare (Longobardi), hanged and burned together in Palermo.
Antonio Longobardi	27 November 1607	From Castello a Mare (Longobardi), hanged and burned together in Palermo.
Rocco Febo	15 March 1608	City executioner, hanged and burned in Palermo.
Vincenzo "Bella di Sciacca" d'Amico	17 June 1608	Habitual sodomite, hanged and burned in Palermo.
Antonio Carcano	22 September 1609	Hanged and burned in Milan.
Two unknowns	1610	Hanged and burned in Bologna.
Giovanni di Bernardo Pieri	4 July 1610	Hanged and burned in Florence.
Vincenzo "Scannaserpi" d'Abbene	1 December 1610	Hanged in Palermo. Also convicted of "field theft".
Leonardo Rocco	1 December 1610	Hanged in Palermo. Also convicted of "field theft".
Melchiore "Franzosino" da Verè	15 February 1611	Burned in Milan, buried in S. Giovanni.
Giovanni Batta d'Antonio	15 July 1611	Cloth weaver, strangled on a stake and burned in Florence.
Giuseppe Colomba	3 March 1612	From Termini and Castronovo respectively, hanged and burned together in Palermo.
Paolo Simonetta	3 March 1612	From Termini and Castronovo respectively, hanged and burned together in Palermo.
Francesco "Picalupo" Lo Re	11 July 1612	Hanged and burned in Palermo.
Paolo Zani	1613	Hanged and burned in Bologna.
Vito Anello	16 July 1613	Hanged in Palermo.
Caviaro	1613 or 1615	Executioner of Modena, hanged. He mocked the exhortations of clergy at the execution.
Giacomo Biavati	1614	Porter, hanged and burned in Bologna.
Orlando Crispo	17 February 1614	Hanged and burned in Palermo.
Bartolomeo di Giovanni Carletti	30 October 1614	Musician, hanged and burned in Florence.
Giovanni Batta Rovida	24 December 1614	Hanged and burned in Milan.
Avril or Avrile	1615	Young Provençal, burned in Turin. His lover, Giovan Battista Marino, fled to France.
Domenico "Meneghino" Facchino	2 March 1615	Hanged and burned in Milan.
Maurizio "Prè Strazzone" Lana	10 October 1615	Son of Madonna Benedetta, burned in La Vetra, Milan; buried in S. Giovanni.
Antonio Crotto	14 January 1616	From Bergamo, hanged and burned in Milan.
Giovanne Corvo	5 May 1617	Hanged in Palermo.
Paolo "Pizo" Marino	7 June 1618	Hanged in Palermo.
Cola Ioanni Cassisi	12 April 1619	Hanged in Palermo.
Giulio di Giovanni Sorbi	9 July 1621	Formerly of Guardia de' Lioni, strangled on a stake and burned in the middle of Pratello, Florence.
Giovanni Incardona	10 December 1622	Hanged in Palermo.
Francesco lo Guzzo	7 December 1623	Hanged on Piano della Marina, Palermo.
Francesco "Cappellitto" Garagazzo	19 December 1623	Hanged in Palermo.
Petro Costa	19 December 1623	Hanged in Palermo.
Piero di Marsilio di Marradi	17 July 1627 (Note: Date also given as 21 October 1627 and 27 July 1654.)	34 or 40 and 43, hanged and burned in Florence. Sources are conflicting on details.
Angiolo di Ottavio Cappelli	17 July 1627	34 or 40 and 43, hanged and burned in Florence. Sources are conflicting on details.
Giovanni Angelo Maggio	19 August 1627	Hanged and burned in Milan.
Antonio d'Aprile	3 August 1628	Hanged in Palermo.
Soliman Moro	26 August 1628	Turkish slave, hanged and burned in Palermo.
Pietro "D. Ramundo" l'Indovino	14 May 1631	Hanged and burned in Palermo.
Francesco Rotundo	17 April 1632	Hanged and burned in Palermo.
Vincenzo "Muratore" Dammacanale	12 October 1633	Hanged and burned in Palermo.
Francesco Turturici	20 June 1634	Hanged in Palermo.
Lorenzo Bivona	7 August 1634	Hanged in Palermo.
Filippo Bonanno Xacca/Sciacca	17 July 1638	Hanged in Palermo under the Grande Almirante.
Blasi Canizzo	5 November 1640	From Licodia, hanged and burned in Palermo.
Vincenzo Oddo	3 November 1646	Hanged in Palermo.
Nicolò Morello	22 July 1655	From Ascoli, hanged and burned in Milan.
Francesco di Vincenzo	22 August 1660	From Viterbo, carried on a cart on a donkey and then beheaded in Florence.
Bernardino Restello	6 February 1662	Hanged and burned in Milan.
Giuseppe Colombo	20 December 1664	Hanged and burned in Milan.
Giuseppe Lopez	1668	Hanged in Naples with Nicola Fanfano. At his execution he admitted that his implication of Fanfano was made under torture, but Fanfano was still hanged.
Alessandro Borromeo	3 June 1668	20-year-old Paduan noble, son of Girolamo Borromeo, beheaded and burned in Venice by the Council of Ten. Described as "scandalous" and "without Christian law" for seducing his friends.
Paolo Cricetti	10 December 1668	19-year-old friend of Borromeo, beheaded and burned in Venice.
Unknown	1686	Hanged in Bologna.
Giacomo "il Marangone" Redaello	22 April 1692	Tortured, strangled with a noose and burned in Milan; also convicted of other crimes. His accomplices were also tortured.
Unknown	29 March 1710	Hanged and beheaded in Milan. Voluntarily confessed to having passive and continued relations with his master, along with "treasonous homicide" and robbery; head displayed at Boschi di Longhignana.
Antonio Fontana	15 September 1724	From Verona, beheaded and burned in Venice. Also convicted of sacrilegious theft.
Pellegrino Torri	1727	Hanged in Bologna; his eyes and nose were also cut off to render his body unrecognizable.
Vincenzo Pelliciari	20 July 1727	Hanged in Modena. Publicly boasted that he had married the devil and had regular relations with him, along with other heresies and blasphemies; tried by the Inquisition and executed by the secular wing.
Giovanni Antonio Cremis	28 May 1736	From Felizzano, hanged and burnt in Alessandria. His accomplice, 15-year-old Giovanni Stefano Barnaba Mordea of Asti, is sentenced to row oars in the royal fleet for 5 years.
Unknown	12 September 1736	28-year-old barber of the boat in S. Giovanni de' Fiorentini, hanged on the bridge of Sant'Angelo, Rome.
Giuseppe del già Domenico Rossi	21 October 1747	Hanged and burned in Florence.
Bernardo Gabrieli	15 May 1748	Cleric, decapitated on a platform between the two columns of St. Mark's, Venice.
Andrea Brazzoi/Brasola	1749	Mantuan, beheaded and burned in Venice.
Antonio Lambranzi	31 August 1752	30 year old becher from Cannaregio, beheaded and burned in Venice by the Council of Ten for "sodomy having used many iniquities".
Bartolomeo Luisetti	10 April 1764	Son of quondam Antonio of Villa Albese, suffocated and burned in the square of del Brolo, Milan, in front of S. Stefano. Pietro Verri reported on the case, claiming Lusietti was a pederast but that he "had never committed a misdeed in his life".
Unknown	1771	Monk, burned in Venice.

=== Malta ===
Name	Date	Notes
Two unknowns	March 1616	Spanish soldier (or sailor) and a local Maltese bardasso (teenage prostitute), both burned; execution described by the Scottish traveller William Lithgow. More than 100 bardassoes fled to Sicily on a galley the following night.

=== Netherlands ===
Name	Date	Notes
Jan van Uutkerke	January 1442	Knight who served in the Burgundian army and as a diplomat to Liège and Cologne. He was arrested in Bruges in December 1441 and tried before the Great Council, who found him guilty alongside two accomplices. van Uutkerke was beheaded as a "grace" before his body was burned in Saeftinghe Castle.
Two unknowns	January 1442	Knight who served in the Burgundian army and as a diplomat to Liège and Cologne. He was arrested in Bruges in December 1441 and tried before the Great Council, who found him guilty alongside two accomplices. van Uutkerke was beheaded as a "grace" before his body was burned in Saeftinghe Castle.
Gooswijn de Wilde	1449	President of the States of Holland, beheaded in Loevestein Castle. Previously served five years as the president of the Council of Flanders. Accused by attorney general Bengaert Saey, whom he had accused of manslaughter in 1447; removed from office on 20 June 1448 and convicted in 1449. Beheaded rather than burnt for admitting his guilt.
Unknown	1463	Likely burned by the Court of Holland.
Philips Saey	1495	Burgundian official, son of the aforementioned Bengaert Saey, burned in the woods outside of The Hague. Former steward of the forester of Holland, he challenged the Grand Council for dismissing him in 1478 and later sued Jan III van Montfort in 1490 over "unpaid annunities and bonds."
Unknown	1605	Burned in Middelburg.
Ingel Harmensz	1643	A young Dutch sailor and a Mardijker, executed (Harmensz drowned, de Sal burned) in Batavia under the VOC.
Bento de Sal	1643	A young Dutch sailor and a Mardijker, executed (Harmensz drowned, de Sal burned) in Batavia under the VOC.
Jan van Cleef	1644	A soldier, a Batavia burgher, and a Council of the Indies member, strangled and burned at the orders of Anthony van Diemen.
Pieter Egbertsz	1644	A soldier, a Batavia burgher, and a Council of the Indies member, strangled and burned at the orders of Anthony van Diemen.
Joost Schouten	1644	A soldier, a Batavia burgher, and a Council of the Indies member, strangled and burned at the orders of Anthony van Diemen.
Gerrit Jansz de Wit	1645	Boatswain, drowned in a bag in Batavia, former partner of Joost Schouten.
Four unknowns	1646	Chinese, burned in Batavia, also convicted of counterfeiting money.
Two unknowns	1647	A ship's captain and a young boy, executed (the captain burnt and the boy drowned) in Batavia.
Five unknowns	1647	Chinese, executed (two burned, two strangled and burned, and one drowned) in Malacca, also convicted of counterfeiting money.
Four unknowns	1648	Chinese, presumed burned in Malacca.
Six unknowns	1652	A 40-year-old Dane and five "black" boys, executed (the Dane burnt, and the boys drowned) in Batavia.
Unknown	1676	Executed in Utrecht, one of three defendants (including a burgomaster).
Two unknowns	1681	An Italian and a 15-year-old boy, caught on a VOC ship. Despite attempts to defend the 15-year-old due to his age, both were sewn into a sack with an iron weight and thrown overboard.
Two unknowns	1686	Two men, likely drowned in a barrel in Amsterdam.
Two unknowns	1702	Two men, executed in Rotterdam for having relations in an almoner's house.
Unknown	1721	Executed in Utrecht.
Leendert Hasenbosch	1725	Hasenbosch, an employee of the Dutch East India Company was abandoned on Ascension Island as punishment for sodomy. As a castaway, he kept a diary. He began with a tent, a month's supply of water, some seeds, instruments, prayer books, clothing, and writing materials. He searched the barren island for water but it was never in consistent supply. During a drought, he began drinking the blood of green turtles and seabirds as well as his own urine, and even urine found inside the bladders of dead turtles. He likely died of thirst around six months. The diary was eventually found by British sailors. In 1726, the translated diary was first published under the title Sodomy Punish'd.
Adriaen Spoor	2 December 1727	Dutch sailors from St. Maertensdyck and Ghent, aged 23 and 18 respectively, on the Zeewijk which wrecked on the Houtman Abrolhos on 9 June. While on the islands, they were caught in "the abominable and god-forsaken deeds of Sodom and Gomorrah." They were subsequently marooned on separate rocky islands nearby.
Pieter Engels	2 December 1727	Dutch sailors from St. Maertensdyck and Ghent, aged 23 and 18 respectively, on the Zeewijk which wrecked on the Houtman Abrolhos on 9 June. While on the islands, they were caught in "the abominable and god-forsaken deeds of Sodom and Gomorrah." They were subsequently marooned on separate rocky islands nearby.
Two unknowns	13 May 1728	Two slaves, drowned together on the Cape of Good Hope; names not recorded.
Jan Backer	12 June 1730	Hanged and burned in the Hague. Backer was a house servant hiring middleman.
Jan Schut	12 June 1730	Hanged and burned in the Hague. Backer was a house servant hiring middleman.
Frans Verheyden	12 June 1730	Occupation unknown, milkman, coat embroiderer, occupation unknown, and servant, hanged and thrown into the sea at Scheveningen with 50-pound weights.
Cornelius Wassermaar	12 June 1730	Occupation unknown, milkman, coat embroiderer, occupation unknown, and servant, hanged and thrown into the sea at Scheveningen with 50-pound weights.
Pieter Styn	12 June 1730	Occupation unknown, milkman, coat embroiderer, occupation unknown, and servant, hanged and thrown into the sea at Scheveningen with 50-pound weights.
Dirk van Royen	12 June 1730	Occupation unknown, milkman, coat embroiderer, occupation unknown, and servant, hanged and thrown into the sea at Scheveningen with 50-pound weights.
Herman Mouillant	12 June 1730	Occupation unknown, milkman, coat embroiderer, occupation unknown, and servant, hanged and thrown into the sea at Scheveningen with 50-pound weights.
Pieter Marteyn Janes Sohn	24 June 1730	Strangled and burned in Amsterdam. Keep was a decorator.
Johannes Keep	24 June 1730	Strangled and burned in Amsterdam. Keep was a decorator.
Maurits van Eeden	24 June 1730	House servant and Johannes Keep's servant, age 18, drowned in a barrel in Amsterdam.
Cornelius Boes	24 June 1730	House servant and Johannes Keep's servant, age 18, drowned in a barrel in Amsterdam.
Jan Westhoff	29 June 1730	Soldiers, strangled and buried under the gallows in Kampen.
Steven Klok	29 June 1730	Soldiers, strangled and buried under the gallows in Kampen.
Leendert de Haas	17 July 1730	60-year-old candlemaker, distiller, and a gentleman's servant, strangled and burnt in Rotterdam, and their ashes dumped from a boat at sea.
Casper Schroder	17 July 1730	60-year-old candlemaker, distiller, and a gentleman's servant, strangled and burnt in Rotterdam, and their ashes dumped from a boat at sea.
Huibert van Borselen	17 July 1730	60-year-old candlemaker, distiller, and a gentleman's servant, strangled and burnt in Rotterdam, and their ashes dumped from a boat at sea.
Pieter van der Hal	21 July 1730	Grain carrier, glove launderer, agent, and tavern keeper; hanged and thrown into the sea at Scheveningen with 100-pound weights.
Adriaen Kuyleman	21 July 1730	Grain carrier, glove launderer, agent, and tavern keeper; hanged and thrown into the sea at Scheveningen with 100-pound weights.
David Munstlager	21 July 1730	Grain carrier, glove launderer, agent, and tavern keeper; hanged and thrown into the sea at Scheveningen with 100-pound weights.
Willem la Feber	21 July 1730	Grain carrier, glove launderer, agent, and tavern keeper; hanged and thrown into the sea at Scheveningen with 100-pound weights.
Antonie Byweegen	21 July 1730	Fishmonger, hanged and burned to ashes in the Hague.
Laurens Hospinjon	16 September 1730	Chief of detectives in the Navy, strangled and thrown in water with a 100-pound weight in Amsterdam.
Cornelis Palamedes	19 October 1730	Teacher, age 56, half strangled and burnt to ash in Veen near Heusden; previously had relationship with Dirk van Royen (see 12 June 1730).
Two unknowns	22 September 1731	A drummer and an orphan, beheaded in Groningen.
Gerrit Loer	24 September 1731	Executions in Zuidhorn: Loer, 48, farmer, scorched alive and strangled before being burnt to ash; had committed sodomy with several persons, including on his way to and from church.; Berents, 32, a Liplander, scorched alive and strangled before being burnt to ash.; Immes, 45, from Huifinga, strangled to death and burned.; Jans, 40 or 41, from Aduwert, strangled to death and burned; no response.; Hendrix, 40, from Nieuwkerk, strangled to death and burned; no response.; Wygers, 45, from Doefem, strangled to death and burned; no response.; Brakel, 37, strangled to death and burned; no response.; Rol, 32 or 36, from Esinga, strangled and burnt; swayed back and forth upon being sentenced and bowed to all present before leaving.; Donderen, 30, strangled and burnt; cried out "Oh! Oh!" upon hearing sentence.; Egberts, 19, strangled and burnt; corrected the judge when age was listed incorrectly in sentence, and bowed saying "It is all right, sir," before leaving.; Peter Cornelisz, 20 or 21, strangled and burnt; appeared to be about to faint as sentence was read but sighed instead.; Hendrik Cornelisz, 21, strangled and burnt; said "I forgive you and thank you gentlemen for the sentence which I shall receive."; Leuwes, 19, strangled and burned; sighed and quickly left.; Idses, 18, strangled and burnt; told the court "I forgive you for the sin you have committed against me."; Jan Jansz, 18, strangled and burnt; no response.; Cornelis Jansz, 18; told the court "You may see how you direct me."; Harms, 16, strangled and burnt; no response.; Tamme Jansz, 14, strangled and burnt; remained silent when sentenced.; Iacobs, 16 or 18, from Nieuhooven, strangled and burnt; no response.
Hendrick Berents	24 September 1731	
Asinga Immes	24 September 1731	
Eysse Jans	24 September 1731	
Gosen Hendrix	24 September 1731	
Jan Wygers	24 September 1731	
Jan Harms Brakel	24 September 1731	
Mindelt Jansz Rol	24 September 1731	
Jan Jacobs den Donderen	24 September 1731	
Jan Egberts	24 September 1731	
Peter Cornelisz	24 September 1731	
Hendrik Cornelisz	24 September 1731	
Hindrik Leuwes	24 September 1731	
Jan Idses	24 September 1731	
Jan Jansz	24 September 1731	
Cornelis Jansz	24 September 1731	
Gerrit Harms	24 September 1731	
Tamme Jansz	24 September 1731	
Thomas Iacobs	24 September 1731	
Jan van der Lelie	24 September 1731	Hanged and thrown into the sea in the Hague.
Class Blanc	1735	Dutch, executed in Batavia. Jacobsz, a sailor, was formerly accused of sodomy in 1713.
Rijkaert Jacobsz	1735	Dutch, executed in Batavia. Jacobsz, a sailor, was formerly accused of sodomy in 1713.
Jan Kemmer	1765	Young man executed in Amsterdam. Claimed his first act took place when still in an orphanage and connected to known sodomite networks after an encounter in Amsterdam's town hall's citizens' hall. Named 15 other boys in his confession. Described as "particularly acquainted with the Truths (Biblical truths)."
Abraham Feijs	1772	19-year-old tailor in Leiden, declared in interrogation he had never slept with a woman and had committed sodomy "hundreds of times". Last execution in Leiden.
Jillis Bruggeman	9 March 1803	Last person executed for sodomy in Netherlands, hanged at Schiedam.

=== Poland ===
Name	Date	Notes
Wojciech Skwarski	1561 (Note: Sometime before March 10th.)	Burned in Kazimierz. Born in Poznań, they were assigned male at birth. They briefly became a monk sometime around 1550 and had relationships with two women while in the monastery. After leaving the monastery, city aldermen ordered Wojciech to live as a woman. They married twice but continued to have numerous female lovers. They engaged in various businesses, such as renting rooms, procuring, beer brewing, and embroidery. They were sentenced to death (and presumably executed) for having sex with women while presenting as one themselves.
Marcin Gołek	9 November 1633	Master baker and his apprentice, burned in Sieradz. Both accused the other of initiating the relationship.
Wojciech ze Sromotki	9 November 1633	Master baker and his apprentice, burned in Sieradz. Both accused the other of initiating the relationship.

=== Portugal ===
Name	Date	Notes
Joana Fernandes	1551	Likely burned in Lisbon. Her partner, Branca Freire, claimed Fernandes seduced her and was a "bad woman" (maa mulher), as well as a witch and sorceress. Freire was sentenced to exile (later reduced to a fine) and Fernandes "appears to have been burnt."
Unknown	1595-1610 (Note: Exact date unspecified.)	Brother of the Sultan of Hormuz, burned in Goa at the orders of Archbishop Aleixo de Meneses despite being "a Muslim candidate for conversion and political asylum."
Domingos Rois da Rocha	28 November 1621	25-year-old mulatto slave and dancer, mulatto alms collector, and 50-year-old priest and curate of São Paulo known as "Punhetário", burned in a Lisbon auto-da-fé at the Rossio. Rois da Rocha, son of the partially Jewish-descended Francisco da Rocha and his slave Joana Elza, was a member of the Dança dos Fanchonos group led by 30-year-old mulatto Antonio Rodrigues. He was "known as a good Christian, always carrying a rosary and giving alms to the poor," but was condemned for dancing in women's clothes and being "a passive recipient of affection from several men."
Luiz Alves	28 November 1621	
Bartolomeu de Góis	28 November 1621	
Two unknowns	1647	Old Christians, burned for sodomy and religious visions in a Lisbon auto-da-fé.
Martim Leite Pereira	9 July 1662	50-year-old nobleman and Knight of the Order of Christ, burned in a Coimbra auto-da-fé with six others. Widower of Anácia de Melo, son of New Christian João Dias Leite, and the father of a 26-year-old daughter; he admitted to sodomizing nine men and 14 women, including a violent encounter with a 13-year-old girl named Maria at a fair after which her mother found her bleeding and semi-conscious.
Santos de Almeida	1664	66-year-old priest and royal chaplain in São Miguel Aquém do Castelo, burned in Lisbon alongside seven others. Almeida, said to have resided over a "conventicle of fanchonos", was known to allow in his house "many young men ... he gave them beds and allowed them to be with each other in debauchery" with guests even using the back garden when all rooms were full; he "welcomed dozens of teenagers who amused themselves there ... in addition to entertaining the frequenters of the house and the priest himself." Almeida's neighbors were aware of this activity, and he was arrested after 22 "serious accusations" and declared "incorrigible" by the courts.
Seven unknowns	1664	
Unknown	3 April 1669	Old Christian priest, burned for sodomy in a Lisbon auto-da-fé with 79 Judaizers.
Unknown	1671	Priest, executed by the Portuguese Inquisition in Lisbon. Last person executed as a fanchono.

=== Scotland ===
Name	Date	Notes
John Litster	1 September 1570	Smiths and servants to the same master, strangled and burnt at the stake together in Edinburgh for the "wild, filthie, execrabill, detestable and unnatural sin of sodomy".
John Swan	1 September 1570	Smiths and servants to the same master, strangled and burnt at the stake together in Edinburgh for the "wild, filthie, execrabill, detestable and unnatural sin of sodomy".
Michael Erskine	2 April 1630	Miller of Newbyres Mill, strangled and burnt for "diverse points of witchcraft and filthy sodomy."

=== Spain ===
Name	Date	Notes
Unknown	1290	Moor, burned at Arguedas "for lying with others".
Juce Abolfaça	1345	Jews from Puente la Reina, burned together at Olite.
Simuel Nahamán	1345	Jews from Puente la Reina, burned together at Olite.
Pascoal de Rojas	1346	Burned at Tudela for "heresy with his body".
Unknown	1373	Servant, burned in Olite for relations with another servant.
Antoni	1395	Slave of Francesc Peres in Barcelona, burned.
Mahoma Mofari	1458	Muslim potters in Lleida sentenced to burn for mutual same-sex relations as well as heterosexual relations with Christian prostitutes. Mahoma converted to Christianity and adopted the name Pere Cirera before the execution, so he was drowned before being burned.
Açen	1458	Muslim potters in Lleida sentenced to burn for mutual same-sex relations as well as heterosexual relations with Christian prostitutes. Mahoma converted to Christianity and adopted the name Pere Cirera before the execution, so he was drowned before being burned.
Margarida Borràs	28 July 1460	Cross-dressing transgender woman, hanged in Valencia.
Joan de Llobera	28 May 1464	Llobera, a councilor of Barcelona in 1463, and Polo, an "immoral hermit", were strangled and burnt at La Rambla in Barcelona.
Bartomeu Polo	28 May 1464	Llobera, a councilor of Barcelona in 1463, and Polo, an "immoral hermit", were strangled and burnt at La Rambla in Barcelona.
Gaspar Rajadell	21 July 1464	Rajadell and Sori, a scribe, were drowned in a wine bucket and then burnt at La Rambla in Barcelona.
Joan Sori	21 July 1464	Rajadell and Sori, a scribe, were drowned in a wine bucket and then burnt at La Rambla in Barcelona.
Five unknowns	1476	Burned in Barcelona during a plague attack.
Marina de Ávila	1489	Hanged in Seville for having "slept carnally with other women like men".
Catalina de Baena	1489	Hanged in Seville for having "slept carnally with other women like men".
Six unknowns	1495	Italians, seen hanged upside down "with their genitals around their necks" by a German traveler in Almería.
Two unknowns	1495 (Note: No date given; presumed to be same year.)	Castilians, seen hanged upside down in the same manner as the Italians by the same German traveler in Madrid.
Two unknowns	1501–1600 (Note: 16th century; exact date unknown.)	Two nuns burned for using "material instruments", recorded by Antonio Gomez.
Twelve unknowns	1506	Dozen men, burned in Seville.
Six unknowns	1519	Executed in Valencia after "a mob fanned by preachers" compelled the authorities to do so.
Salomon Antón (Note: Also named as Antonio Salamone and Antonio Salomón)	20 December 1519 (Note: Date also given as 20 September 1519)	Sicilian master (Note: Also listed as quartermaster) of the Victoria, strangled and burned under Ferdinand Magellan at Santa Lucia, Brazil. Caught in the act off the coast of Guinea. His partner, Genoese apprentice sailor António Varesa, (Note: Also named as Antonio Ginovés, also listed as a "ship's boy" or "grummet") drowned on 27 April 1520 when thrown overboard by his shipmates. (Note: Also reported as a suicide or execution, with some sources stating he too was sentenced to death.)
Salvador Vidal	1541	Rural priest, "relaxed" (handed over to be executed) to the secular arm by Saragossa tribunal.
Unknown	1546	Layman, burned in a Saragossa auto-da-fé.
Unknown	1551	Castilian soldier, executed in Saragossa awaiting a public auto-da-fé.
Four unknowns	1558	A Castilian jurist/lawyer, 2 priests, and a French shepherd boy, all burned in a Saragossa auto-da-fé.
Unknown	1566	A French interpreter who lived with the Guale, garroted under the orders of Pedro Menéndez de Avilés at Santa Elena. Pedro's nephew and an ensign told him that he was "a Lutheran and a great sodomite," so he lured the interpreter out by claiming he had presents to give to the cacique. The cacique's oldest son, one of two natives living with the interpreter, cried upon hearing this and begged him "to return at once." The interpreter was killed in secrecy on arrival, and the Guale were told that he had disappeared.
Three unknowns	1572	Foreigners, burned in a Saragossa auto-da-fé with 9 Aragonese peasants convicted of bestiality along with their animals (mules and donkeys.) The size of the group made gathering enough wood for the executions difficult.
Two unknowns	April 1573	Trinitarian monks, both Castilians from Seville, executed in Valencia.
Juan de Gurrea y Aragón	6 April 1573	Count of Ribagorza, garroted in Madrid. He had previously murdered his wife, Luisa Pacheco Cabrera, and fled to France and later Italy. He was arrested in Italy after a search by the Inquisition at the insistence of his wife's cousin, the Count of Chinchón.
Martín de Castro	1574	Male prostitute, burned in Madrid; present at the trials of two high-ranking clients, Don Pedro Luis Galceran de Borgia and the Count of Ribagorza, in 1572.
Miguel Salvador de Morales	25 June 1574	Morales, a Trinitarian friar, and Tafolla had known each other since childhood, even sleeping in the same room. Tafolla had just returned from traveling in Italy and went to Morales's monastery in Valencia, where they were caught, and both were subsequently burned.
Baptista Tafolla	25 June 1574	Morales, a Trinitarian friar, and Tafolla had known each other since childhood, even sleeping in the same room. Tafolla had just returned from traveling in Italy and went to Morales's monastery in Valencia, where they were caught, and both were subsequently burned.
Juan Bautista Finocho	July 1575	Mariner on the galleon San Tadeo, burned in the harbor of La Havana.
Pascual Jaime	1578	56-year-old lay priest and chaplain to the Duke of Alcalá and the former's most recent partner, burned on separate occasions in Seville. Jaime "had shown his fondness for young foreigners or travelers" for over 40 years; he was ceremonially laicized shortly before his death. Legasteca, who "cried like a boy" and claimed Jaime "had seduced him with offers of fine clothes and other vanities," was executed a few days afterwards.
Francisco Legasteca	1578	56-year-old lay priest and chaplain to the Duke of Alcalá and the former's most recent partner, burned on separate occasions in Seville. Jaime "had shown his fondness for young foreigners or travelers" for over 40 years; he was ceremonially laicized shortly before his death. Legasteca, who "cried like a boy" and claimed Jaime "had seduced him with offers of fine clothes and other vanities," was executed a few days afterwards.
Two unknowns	14 February 1579	Teenage soldiers, both aged under 17 and one coming from Biscay, burned at the orders of their captain in Seville for "immoral touchings" while "frolicking in bed together" and "talking immorally."
Unknown	1581	Neapolitan, burned for a "habit of Italy" in Seville.
Unknown	1584	Slave, executed in Saragossa. His partner, a Morisco teen, who had been publicly punished for heresy at an auto-da-fé just before they were caught, was sentenced to the galleys.
Diego Maldonado	1585	Sodomite group, burned together in Seville by secular authorities. Maldonado, a member of a "well-to-do family" from Granada, was the group leader.
Salvador Martín	1585	Sodomite group, burned together in Seville by secular authorities. Maldonado, a member of a "well-to-do family" from Granada, was the group leader.
Alonso Sánchez	1585	Sodomite group, burned together in Seville by secular authorities. Maldonado, a member of a "well-to-do family" from Granada, was the group leader.
Five unknowns	1585	Sodomite group, burned together in Seville by secular authorities. Maldonado, a member of a "well-to-do family" from Granada, was the group leader.
Muyuca or Machuco	1585	African, probably a freed slave, burned in Seville as a alcahuete (procurer) alongside two "very beautiful" boys. Described as "very well known for the dealings he had with good-looking gentlemen," "introducing some boys to others," and "(performing) 'marriages' of sorts." He was dressed in a silk ruff, cosmetics, a wig, and a breast plate with his own image on it; the two boys also wore silk ruffs and had their "faces painted." These outfits served as forced humiliation and the trio were also forced to hold hands "like one does in a marriage" during the procession to their execution.
Two unknowns	1585	
Seven unknowns	1587	7 adolescents under 21 years old, executed (Note: Both for homosexuality and bestiality; no details given.) in Saragossa.
Gaspar Arrimen	1588	Moriscos in Valencia, both age 20; both burned.
Pedro Alache	1588	Moriscos in Valencia, both age 20; both burned.
Two unknowns	1588	17-year-olds, executed in Saragossa.
Two unknowns	1588	French, burned in Seville.
Francisco Bautista	1596	Burned in Seville; his partner, a 14-year-old boy from a charitable home, was given 200 lashes.
Twelve unknowns	1600	Dozen men, burned in Seville.
Gerónimo Ponce de Leon	1603	Mulattoes, tried and executed by the Audencia de la Casa de la Contratación in Seville.
Domingo López	1603	Mulattoes, tried and executed by the Audencia de la Casa de la Contratación in Seville.
Unknown	1604	60-year-old street vendor of Triana, burned in Seville; described as "fat, deaf, and blind."
Francisco	1606	18-year-old, burned in Seville; executed alongside the flogging of a boy under fourteen, Jerónimo, while their mutual partner, another boy named Bernardo, was forced to watch.
Jose Estravagante	1607	Galley prisoners, 31 and 20, respectively; Teixidor had been convicted of sodomy and Estravagente of another crime. Fellow prisoners denounced they were having an affair and they were subsequently burned in Valencia by the Inquisition.
Bartolomeo Teixidor	1607	Galley prisoners, 31 and 20, respectively; Teixidor had been convicted of sodomy and Estravagente of another crime. Fellow prisoners denounced they were having an affair and they were subsequently burned in Valencia by the Inquisition.
Juan Duarte	1610	A friar, another man, and two mulattoes, all burned in Seville. The latter two lived together in the same room and "sometimes ... sought new experiences and secretly took other 'young boys' to that room."
Manuel López	1610	A friar, another man, and two mulattoes, all burned in Seville. The latter two lived together in the same room and "sometimes ... sought new experiences and secretly took other 'young boys' to that room."
Juan Pérez	1610	A friar, another man, and two mulattoes, all burned in Seville. The latter two lived together in the same room and "sometimes ... sought new experiences and secretly took other 'young boys' to that room."
Antón de Morales	1610	A friar, another man, and two mulattoes, all burned in Seville. The latter two lived together in the same room and "sometimes ... sought new experiences and secretly took other 'young boys' to that room."
Unknown	November 1611	Mulatto hermit, burned in Madrid. He was mentioned in a letter from Lope de Vega to the Duke of Sessa dated the 30th the same month, and is likely the subject of the poem "A un ermitãno mulato" by Francisco de Quevedo.
Two unknowns	1616	Colored, burned in Seville. Names not recorded.
Three unknowns	1619	Executed during two Saragossa autos-da-fé.
Nicolas Gonzales	November 1625	20-year-old prostitute from Orihuela and those he implicated under questioning (including 7 slaves, such as a 40-year-old Turk), burned together in Valencia. He named over 60 men and boys when questioned. Gonzales admitted to not only prostituting himself, but also procuring others his age (usually to slaves). 128 quintals of wood were needed to burn all 12 over a 7-hour period, "something never seen or heard of in Valencia".
Eleven unknowns	November 1625	20-year-old prostitute from Orihuela and those he implicated under questioning (including 7 slaves, such as a 40-year-old Turk), burned together in Valencia. He named over 60 men and boys when questioned. Gonzales admitted to not only prostituting himself, but also procuring others his age (usually to slaves). 128 quintals of wood were needed to burn all 12 over a 7-hour period, "something never seen or heard of in Valencia".
Two unknowns	1626	Executed in Valencia outside of the inquisition palace "without making a noise".
Unknown	1640	Burned in Granada.
Unknown	November 1647	Burned in a Barcelona auto-da-fé attended by the Prince of Condé.
Francisco	1648	Portuguese mulatto, tried and executed by the Audencia de la Casa de la Contratación in Seville.
Juan Chapinero	1651	Two blacks (one free, the latter a slave), publicly garroted and their corpses burnt in Mexico City.
Nicolás	1651	Two blacks (one free, the latter a slave), publicly garroted and their corpses burnt in Mexico City.
Juan de la Cruz	March 1670	Indigenous resident of La Lagunilla, publicly burned in the public market of San Juan, Mexico City on a Monday at 4:00 PM.
Five unknowns	25 June 1671	Two mulattoes and three blacks, burned in San Lázaro, Mexico City; caught in the act at Juan de Ávila's mill in Mixcoac. The site of their execution is today the location of Mexico's national archives.
Seven unknowns	13 November 1673	A group of mulattoes, blacks, and mestizos, burned in Mexico City; caught in the act in the same textile mill.
Two unknowns	20 November 1686	A mulatto and a mestizo, burned together in Mexico City; a black man was publicly shamed as an accomplice.
Two unknowns	February 1735	Sentenced to death and their corpses burned in Mexico City "for the grave crime of Sodomy"; case reported in the Gazeta de México.
Two unknowns	27 August 1738	Indigenous, sentenced to burn in Mexico City for the "nefarious crime"; on the way to be executed, members of the local cofradía accompanied them.
Unknown	23 June 1784	"The nefarious offender of this royal jail", burned in Mexico City and his body reduced to ashes in the accustomed site.

=== Sweden ===
Name	Date	Notes
Peter Johannes	1613	Priest from Brandstad, burned in Scania. His same-sex relations were publicly known, leading Christian IV to order the bishop of Scania to "have him defrocked, imprisoned, and charged," after which he was burned "as a serious warning to others."
Lisbetha Olsdotter	November 1679	Beheaded at the Hötorget in Stockholm for wearing men's clothes and marrying a woman.

=== Switzerland ===
Name	Date	Notes
Lord Haspisperch	1277	German aristocrat, burned by Rudolph I in Basel. Unknown if politically motivated.
Friedrich	1399	Cook, burned in Basel; his partner, Friedrich Schregelin, was banished.
Hermann von Hohenlandberg	1431	Burgher and noble, accused of robbing travelers outside of Zurich in 1419; executed for multiple relationships with male adolescents. Reportedly offered a 14-year-old "clothes" for accompanying him.
Two unknowns	1444	Bishop of Geneva's Greek personal chef and his Genevan partner, both hanged in Geneva; first executions in Geneva for sodomy.
Two unknowns	1464	Sexton of a pilgrimage church and a boy, both burned in Einsiedeln.
Eighteen unknowns	1474	Captured Lombard mercenaries, burned in Basel.
Richard Puller von Hohenburg	24 September 1482	Alsatian nobleman and knight and his servant, burned in Zurich.
Anton Mätzler	24 September 1482	Alsatian nobleman and knight and his servant, burned in Zurich.
Hans Zogg	1489	Burned in Lucerne.
Uli im Tann	1489	Burned in Lucerne.
Hans Waldmann	6 April 1489	Former mayor of Zurich, beheaded for sodomy as well as financial corruption and foreign collusion.
Jehan Ruaulx	1493	Pastry chef, burned in Fribourg. Ruaulx had returned from France with an ear and his penis missing for attempted sodomy in Sisteron, and subsequently confessed to relations with men and boys, including a cleric, in Lausanne and Fribourg.
Heinrich Baltschmid	1506	Burned in Lucerne.
Felix Bluntschli	1506	Burned in Lucerne.
Caspar Noll	1506	Burned in Lucerne.
Hans Honegger	1506	Burned in Lucerne.
Jacob von Schloss	1515	Burned in Zurich; arrested for theft, found to have had relations with several men of superior age and economic status. First seduced by a notary in the Savoy court of Geneva, he blamed the welsch (French, Savoyards, etc.) of introducing "such viciousness" to Germans.
Andres von Tschafel	1519	Broken on the wheel and burned in Lucerne.
Blasius Hipold	1519	Burned in Lucerne.
Bonifaz Dorn	27 January 1519	Decapitated in Lucerne.
Johannes Nusser	1520	Broken on the wheel in Lucerne. Case brought before council of Lucerne after it was discovered he had been given a jacket for having sex with a man under a bridge in Rome. Confessed to sex with "human and animals, women and men, boys and adult men, Italians and Germans, laypeople and clerics" while serving as papal guard in Rome. Rewarded lavishly with "three double jackets" for prostituting himself to a monk in a stable. Nusser also acted as a priest, having "sermonized and heard confession."
Hans Propstli	1525	Decapitated and burned, first execution in Solothurn. Confessed to offering sex to other men whom he shared beds with, but all refused. Blamed the welsch for his behavior.
Hans Fritschi	1530	Monastery laborer from Pfungen, decapitated in Schaffhausen. Tried alongside Hans Räs for "unchristian and heretical (sodomitical) acts". They had met while working in Rheinau monastery two years prior. Fritschi asked to be decapitated instead of burned, a mercy the court granted. Fritschi was likely 15 to 25, Räs probably the same or slightly older. Räs also gave Fritschi a new pair of pants for Christmas. Räs, the instigator, may have been fugitive after the trial.
Balthasar Bar	1532	Drowned in Lucerne, blamed the welsch for his behavior.
Marx Anthon	1537	Burned in Zurich.
Jorg Sigler	1537	Burned in Lucerne, also charged with sexually abusing cattle.
Bonifacius Amerbach	1538	Burned in Schaffhausen.
Uli Rugger	1540	Decapitated in Zurich.
Hans Blatter	1540	Burned in Zurich.
Jacob Muller	1545	Decapitated and burned in Zurich.
Unknown	1550	Young French man, hanged in Geneva.
Jean Fontaine	1554 or 1555	Executed in Geneva, was involved with Branlard (see 1561).
Unknown	1556	French man, hanged in Geneva.
Jaquema Gonet	1559	Adolescent servant girl, drowned in Geneva for having relations with her employer's 15-year-old daughter Esther Bodineau, with whom she molested Esther's 8- or 9-year-old brother Nicolas.
Five unknowns	1560	Three Turkish galley slaves and two French Catholics from a captured Savoy fort, burned together by Genevan forces. The slaves first admitted to the act, and implicated the Catholics when questioned.
Guillaume Brancard/Branlard	1561	Drowned in Geneva. His partner, Ramel, was given a reduced sentence due to his age. Branlard had never had a relationship with a woman per court records.
Thoni Ruttiman	1561	Hanged in Zurich.
Pierre Jobert	1562	French, had a long-standing relationship; both drowned in Geneva.
Thibaud Lespligny	1562	French, had a long-standing relationship; both drowned in Geneva.
Unknown	1566	Italian student, age 22, drowned in Geneva.
Bartholomé Tecia	10 June 1566	Piedmontese student, age 15, drowned in Geneva.
Rudolf Bachmann	1567	Decapitated and burned in Zurich. Frei and Bachmann had shared a bed while Bachmann's wife was in confinement.
Uli Frei	1567	Decapitated and burned in Zurich. Frei and Bachmann had shared a bed while Bachmann's wife was in confinement.
Unknown	1568	French man, drowned in Geneva.
Françoise-Jeanne Morel	1568	Drowned in Geneva. An itinerant plague worker accused of molesting her co-worker Amber, whom she was sharing a bed with; Amber resisted and a violent assault ensued. Morel had admitted to fornication with a male 5 years earlier, initially using this to deny the charge with Amber but later retracted this, subsequently admitting her guilt under torture, as well as to having relations with both men and women while forcibly denying having ever taken money for sex.
Wilhelm von Muhlhausen	1579	Burned in Zurich.
Unknown	28 May 1586	Burned between Lenzburg and Aarau.
Two unknowns	1590	French soldier, age 25, and his valet, also French, age 18; both burned in Geneva.
Three unknowns	1590	Turkish galley slaves, burned in Geneva.
Jean Chaffrey	February 1590	Two Europeans (Chaffrey, age 20, from Dauphine; Chappuis, age 15, Genevan) and 3 Muslim converts to Calvinism (Mohamet, age 35, from Martara; Assan, age 20, from Turkey; and Arnaud, age 34, from Rumania) executed following trial for group homosexuality in Geneva. A 3rd European was acquitted.
Etienne Chappuis	February 1590	Two Europeans (Chaffrey, age 20, from Dauphine; Chappuis, age 15, Genevan) and 3 Muslim converts to Calvinism (Mohamet, age 35, from Martara; Assan, age 20, from Turkey; and Arnaud, age 34, from Rumania) executed following trial for group homosexuality in Geneva. A 3rd European was acquitted.
Tatare Mohamet	February 1590	Two Europeans (Chaffrey, age 20, from Dauphine; Chappuis, age 15, Genevan) and 3 Muslim converts to Calvinism (Mohamet, age 35, from Martara; Assan, age 20, from Turkey; and Arnaud, age 34, from Rumania) executed following trial for group homosexuality in Geneva. A 3rd European was acquitted.
Assan	February 1590	Two Europeans (Chaffrey, age 20, from Dauphine; Chappuis, age 15, Genevan) and 3 Muslim converts to Calvinism (Mohamet, age 35, from Martara; Assan, age 20, from Turkey; and Arnaud, age 34, from Rumania) executed following trial for group homosexuality in Geneva. A 3rd European was acquitted.
Ali Arnaud	February 1590	Two Europeans (Chaffrey, age 20, from Dauphine; Chappuis, age 15, Genevan) and 3 Muslim converts to Calvinism (Mohamet, age 35, from Martara; Assan, age 20, from Turkey; and Arnaud, age 34, from Rumania) executed following trial for group homosexuality in Geneva. A 3rd European was acquitted.
Franciscus de Rouiere	1596	Burned in Sankt Gallen.
Pierre Dufour	13 November 1600	Genevan citizen and his partner, a local peasant. Brelat, a cowherd, openly boasted about their relationship due to Dufour's high social standing, but Brelat claimed Dufour was guilty of buggery (but not a bugger itself) after a violent fistfight. Both were subsequently drowned.
Pierre Brelat	13 November 1600	Genevan citizen and his partner, a local peasant. Brelat, a cowherd, openly boasted about their relationship due to Dufour's high social standing, but Brelat claimed Dufour was guilty of buggery (but not a bugger itself) after a violent fistfight. Both were subsequently drowned.
Jephat Scheurmann	1609	Possibly executed in Lucerne; claimed to have been "seduced" as a young man "in foreign countries" by an apprentice from Fribourg.
Pierre Canal	2 February 1610	Official burned in Geneva. Arrested for treason and homicide, confessed under torture.
Three unknowns	1610	3 partners of Pierre Canal, including a gatekeeper, all drowned in Geneva.
Jean de la Rue	1617	Age 80, arrested for making a pass in an inn. Openly admitted to having had relations with many people in Geneva and elsewhere "for pleasure, for grain, and for poverty". Burned in Geneva after this single interrogation.
Unknown	1621	Catholic Savoyard, age 50, burned in Geneva.
Melchior Brütschli	1629	Executed in Lucerne. His partner, Jacob Franck, fled the region.
Unknown	1634	Neapolitan, burned in Geneva; his partner, his French valet, banished.
Two unknowns	1647	Italians, executed (one hanged and the other burned) in Geneva.

== See also ==
- Capital punishment for homosexuality
- Criminalization of homosexuality in majority-Muslim countries
- Homosexuality in society
- List of executed people
- Violence against LGBT people
