= Antonio Gómez =

Antonio Gómez may refer to:

- Antonio Gómez (jurist), Spanish jurist and priest
- Antonio Enríquez Gómez (c. 1601–1661), Spanish dramatist, poet and novelist
- Antonio Gómez (boxer) (born 1945), Venezuelan featherweight boxer
- Antonio Gómez Medina (born 1970), Mexican wrestler
- Antonio Gómez (footballer, born 1973), Spanish footballer
- Antonio Gómez (footballer, born 1992), Spanish footballer
- Antonio Gómez Rufo (born 1954), Spanish writer
