= James Pratt and John Smith =

Last people to be executed for sodomy in England

James Pratt (1805–1835), also known as John Pratt, and John Smith (1795–1835) were two British men who, in November 1835, became the last people to be executed for sodomy in England. Pratt and Smith were arrested in August of that year after allegedly having "carnal knowledge" of each other in a room rented by another man, William Bonill. Bonill was not present when this took place, but was nevertheless convicted of being an accessory and was transported to Australia, where he died.

Some modern human rights activists have cast doubt on the facts and legality of the convictions. In January 2017, Pratt and Smith were among those who were posthumously pardoned by the Alan Turing law which pardoned those who had been convicted of same-sex carnal offences which no longer exist in the UK.

== Biographies ==
James Pratt
- Born: 1805
- Died: 27 November 1835 (aged 30); Newgate Prison, London, England
- Cause of death: Execution by hanging
- Conviction: Buggery (posthumously pardoned in 2017)
- Penalty: Death

James Pratt was born in 1805 and worked as a groom. He was married and lived with his wife and children at Deptford, Kent. (Note: Sources give varying ages for the two men. The account of their trial in The Proceedings of the Old Bailey states they were 30 and 40 years old. A contemporary newspaper report of their execution (The Morning Post, issue 20273, page 4) states they were 32 and 34 years old.)

John Smith
- Born: 1795
- Died: 27 November 1835 (aged 40); Newgate Prison, London, England
- Cause of death: Execution by hanging
- Conviction: Buggery (posthumously pardoned in 2017)
- Penalty: Death

John Smith was born in 1795 and was from Southwark Christchurch. He was described in court proceedings and contemporary newspaper reports as an unmarried labourer, although other sources state he was married and worked as a servant.

== Arrest ==
William Bonill, aged 68, had lived for 13 months in a rented room at a house near the Blackfriars Road, Southwark, London. His landlord stated that Bonill had frequent male visitors, who generally came in pairs, and that his suspicions became aroused on the afternoon of 29 August 1835, when Pratt and Smith came to visit Bonill.

The landlord climbed to an outside vantage point in the loft of a nearby stable building, where he could see through the window of Bonill's room, before coming down to look into the room through the keyhole. Both the landlord and his wife later claimed they both looked through the keyhole and saw Pratt and Smith engaging in carnal relations with each other. The landlord then broke open the door to confront them. Bonill was absent but returned a few minutes later with a jug of ale. The landlord went to fetch a police constable and all three men were arrested. The arrest was carried out by Sergeant Robert Valentine of the Metropolitan Police. Valentine took Pratt, Smith and Bonhill to the Union Hall police office in Southwark, which served as a joint magistrate's court and police station. Local magistrate Hensleigh Wedgwood asked some initial questions and found there were sufficient witnesses and evidence to send the group to full trial. As the next sessions of the Old Bailey were not due for a month, they remanded into custody at the Horsemonger Lane Gaol to await trial.

== Trial and execution ==
Pratt, Smith and Bonill were tried on 21 September 1835 at the Central Criminal Court, before Baron Gurney, a judge who had the reputation of being independent and acute, but also harsh. Pratt and Smith were convicted under section 15 of the Offences Against the Person Act 1828, which had replaced the 1533 Buggery Act, and were sentenced to death by the Recorder of London Charles Law. (Note: In the period from 1810 to 1835, 46 people convicted of sodomy were hanged and 32 sentenced to death but reprieved. A further 716 were imprisoned or sentenced to the pillory before its use was restricted in 1816. (See: Lauterbach and Alber (2009), p. 49.)) (Note: The sentence of death was mandatory, but under the Judgement of Death Act 1823, the judge would have had the power to commute it to imprisonment.) William Bonill was convicted as an accessory and sentenced to 14 years of penal transportation. A number of witnesses came forward to testify to the good character of Pratt. No character witnesses came forward to testify on behalf of Smith.

The conviction of the three men rested entirely on what the landlord and his wife claimed to have witnessed, and the evidence of the police constable who had examined the clothing of both men after his arrival at Bonhill's lodging house. Modern commentators have cast doubts on their testimony, based on the narrow field of vision afforded by a keyhole and the acts (some anatomically impossible) the couple claimed to have witnessed during the brief length of time they were looking.

The magistrate, Hensleigh Wedgwood, who had committed the three men to trial, subsequently wrote to the Home Secretary, Lord John Russell, arguing for the commutation of the death sentences, stating:

It is the only crime where there is no injury done to any individual and in consequence it requires a very small expense to commit it in so private a manner and to take such precautions as shall render conviction impossible. It is also the only capital crime that is committed by rich men but owing to the circumstances I have mentioned they are never convicted.

Although Wedgwood was a deeply religious man (Note: Wedgwood later resigned from the a magistracy because he felt the duties were incompatible with the commandments of the Bible.) he did not concur with the then prevailing view of society that sodomy committed between humans should be a capital offence. He also judged it unjust that it was a sentence more likely to befall poorer men than richer men as richer men could afford a private space that would make their arrest less likely. And even if arrested, Wedgwood might have observed, a richer man would have had the resources to post bail money, and then flee abroad. (Note: This had happened 13 years earlier in 1822, when Percy Jocelyn, Bishop of Clogher, had been arrested with a soldier for having sex in a private room in a London pub. Despite the enormous public scandal, he was able to flee to Scotland and live there in anonymity. It likewise happened six years later in 1841, when the Member of Parliament William John Bankes fled abroad after being released on bail.) However, despite this degree of sympathy, Wedgwood described the men as "degraded creatures" in another letter.

On 5 November 1835, Charles Dickens and the newspaper editor John Black visited Newgate Prison; Dickens wrote an account of this in Sketches by Boz and described seeing Pratt and Smith while they were being held there:

The other two men were at the upper end of the room. One of them, who was imperfectly seen in the dim light, had his back towards us, and was stooping over the fire, with his right arm on the mantel-piece, and his head sunk upon it. The other was leaning on the sill of the farthest window. The light fell full upon him, and communicated to his pale, haggard face, and disordered hair, an appearance which, at that distance, was ghastly. His cheek rested upon his hand; and, with his face a little raised, and his eyes wildly staring before him, he seemed to be unconsciously intent on counting the chinks in the opposite wall.

The gaoler who was escorting Dickens confidently predicted to him that the two would be executed and was proved right. Seventeen individuals were sentenced to death at the September and October sessions of the Central Criminal Court for offences that included burglary, robbery, and attempted murder. On 21 November, all were granted remission of their death sentences under the Royal Prerogative of Mercy with the exceptions of Pratt and Smith. There had been previous reprieves of men sentenced to death for sodomy, such as Martin Mellet and James Farthing who had been condemned in 1828 but were instead transported to Australia. But this was not granted to Pratt and Smith despite an appeal for mercy submitted by the men's wives that was heard by the Privy Council. A petition for mercy was even made by the landlord and his wife who had been witnesses against them.

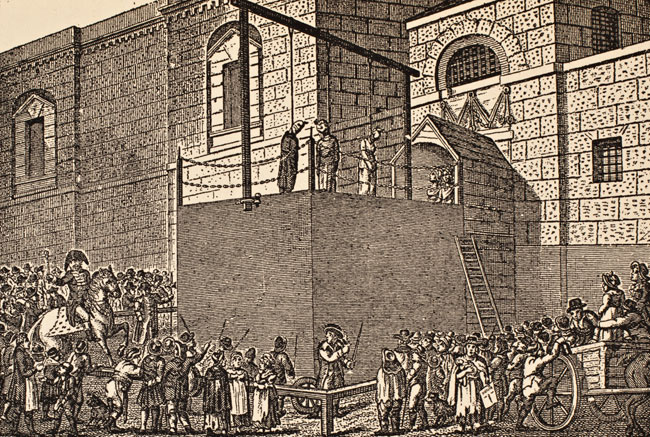
An execution outside Newgate Prison in London, early 19th century

Pratt and Smith were hanged in front of Newgate Prison on the morning of 27 November. The crowd of spectators was described in The Times' newspaper report as larger than usual; this was possibly because the hanging was the first to have taken place at Newgate in nearly two years. (Note: Pratt and Smith were the only people to be executed at Newgate in the three-year period 1834–1836; this partial, temporary moratorium may have been for political reasons and because of a change in the law. Prior to 1834, individuals had been executed for any of 20 different offences; after 1836, only convicted murderers were hanged outside Newgate, until the ending of public execution in 1868. See A History of London's Newgate Prison)

The report of the execution in The Morning Post states that when the men were led onto the scaffold the crowd began to hiss, and this continued until the moment of their execution. Possibly this indicated the crowd's disagreement with the execution, or it may have indicated disapproval of the men's alleged acts. Pratt was reportedly too weak to stand, and had to be held upright by the executioner's assistants while preparations were made to hang him.

The event was sufficiently notable for a printed broadside to be published and sold. This described the men's trial and included the purported text of a final letter that was claimed to have been written by Smith to a friend.

Bonill was one of 290 prisoners transported to Australia on the ship Asia, which departed England on 5 November 1835 and arrived in Van Diemen's Land (now Tasmania) on 21 February 1836. Bonill died at the age of 74 at New Norfolk Hospital in Van Diemen's Land on 29 April 1841.

While no further executions for sodomy occurred after those of Pratt and Smith, it remained an act that could in theory be punished by capital punishment until 1861.

== Legacy ==
A collection of contemporary documents, including petitions made on behalf of the men, and letters about their case are held by the United Kingdom National Archives.

Both Pratt and Smith are central characters in the stage play Particular Disposition, written by Benjamin Fulk. The song "45 George Street" by Bird in the Belly tells their story.

The case of Pratt and Smith is the subject of the non-fiction book James and John: A True Story of Prejudice and Murder by Chris Bryant MP published in February 2024.

In April 2024, Southwark Liberal Democrat councillor Victor Chamberlain proposed a rainbow plaque be unveiled on Blackfriars Road to commemorate Pratt and Smith.

== See also ==
- List of people executed for homosexuality in Europe
