= Jacopo Bonfadio =

Italian humanist and historian

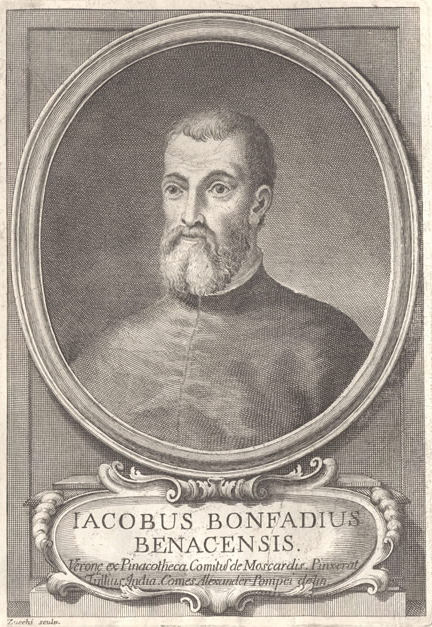
- Born: 1508; Garda, Italy
- Died: 19 July 1550 (aged 41–42); Genoa, Italy

Jacopo Bonfadio (c. 1508 – 19 July 1550) was an Italian humanist and historian.

Born in Garda, he was educated at Verona and Padua. Beginning in 1532, he worked as secretary for various members of the clergy in Rome and Naples. In 1540, he gained employment in Padua with the son of Cardinal-humanist Pietro Bembo. While working for Bembo's son, he met and became friends with notable humanists of the time and was a contemporary of Annibal Caro. He also gained fame from his poetry, which earned him an invitation to teach philosophy at the University of Genoa in 1544. While there, he was commissioned to write a history of the Republic of Genoa since 1528.

In 1541, Bonfadio, among others, coined the term una terza natura, meaning 'nature improved by art', and subsequently, many designers utilized the concept. Large-scale views of the Medici villas, the grand vistas of Louis XIV, and the planning of 16th-century and later English country houses show how this idea was incorporated.

Bonfadio's humanist views earned him some powerful enemies in Genoa. In 1550, after he had completed Annales Genuendis, ab anno 1528 recuperatae libertatis usque ad annum 1550 (his history of the Republic of Genoa from 1528 to 1550), his writings angered the powerful Genoese families the Dorias, the Adornos, the Spinolas, and the Fieschi, who sought revenge against him for daring to record and judge their actions. They proceeded to accuse him of sodomy, for which he was arrested, tried, and condemned to death. He was beheaded, and his body was burnt. The minutes of his trial have been lost.

The Annales Genuendis have been translated into Italian by Paschetti, and a new Latin edition was published at Brescia in 1747. Scholars have had difficulty determining the exact date of his execution. Most official sources report it as having taken place in 1550, while others give the date as 1560, or even as late as 1580, though the latter date has been widely discredited by later scholars.

== See also ==
- List of people executed for homosexuality

== Additional sources ==
- (in Italian)Biography of Jacopo Bonfadio
- (in Italian)Biography at culturagay.it
