= Jacques Chausson =

Jacques Chausson (c. 1618 – 29 December 1661) was a French ex-customs manager and writer. He was arrested on 16 August 1661 and charged with attempted rape of a young nobleman, Octave des Valons. He was convicted of sodomy and sentenced to death. His tongue was cut out and he was burned at the stake (without being suffocated first, the more common and "merciful" practice).

== See also ==
- List of people executed for homosexuality in Europe
