= Antonio Gómez (footballer, born 1992) =

Spanish footballer (born 1992)

Personal information
- Full name: Antonio Gómez Roldán
- Date of birth: 20 June 1992 (age 34)
- Place of birth: La Llagosta, Spain
- Height: 1.72 m (5 ft 7 1/2 in)
- Position: Winger

Team information
- Current team: Ripollet

Youth career
- L'Hospitalet
- 2011: Castelldefels

Senior career*
Years	Team	Apps	(Gls)
2011–2013	Castelldefels	22	(3)
2011–2012	→ Gramenet B (loan)		
2013–2014	Sabadell B	31	(2)
2013	Sabadell	1	(0)
2014–2016	Montañesa	26	(6)
2016–2018	Mollet	25	(3)
2018–2020	Molletense	27	(6)
2020–	Ripollet	2	(0)
- * Club domestic league appearances and goals as of 04:25, 27 June 2021 (UTC)

Antonio Gómez Roldán (born 20 June 1992) is a Spanish footballer who plays for Ripollet as a winger.

== Football career ==
Born in La Llagosta, Barcelona, Catalonia, Gómez finished his formation with UE Castelldefels' youth setup, after joining the club from neighbouring CE L'Hospitalet in April 2011. In July, he was loaned to UDA Gramenet's reserves, and was assigned to the first-team in the 2012 summer.

On 8 May 2013, Gómez moved to CE Sabadell FC, being assigned to the reserves. On 1 September, he played his first match as a professional, coming on as a second-half substitute in a 0–3 home loss against Deportivo La Coruña in the Segunda División championship.
