= Homosexuality in society =

Homosexuality, as a phenomenon and as a behavior, has existed throughout all eras in human societies.

== Demographics ==
Reliable data as to the size of the gay and lesbian population is of value in informing public policy. For example, demographics would help in calculating the costs and benefits of domestic partnership benefits, of the impact of legalizing gay adoption, and of the impact of the U.S. military's Don't ask, don't tell policy. Further, knowledge of the size of the "gay and lesbian population holds promise for helping social scientists understand a wide array of important questions—questions about the general nature of labor market choices, accumulation of human capital, specialization within households, discrimination, and decisions about geographic location."

Measuring the prevalence of homosexuality may present difficulties. The research must measure some characteristic that may or may not be defining of sexual orientation. The class of people with same-sex desires may be larger than the class of people who act on those desires, which in turn may be larger than the class of people who self-identify as gay/lesbian/bisexual.

In 1948 and 1953, Alfred Kinsey reported that nearly 46% of the male subjects had "reacted" sexually to persons of both sexes in the course of their adult lives, and 37% had had at least one homosexual experience. Kinsey's methodology was criticized. A later study tried to eliminate the sample bias, but still reached similar conclusions.

Estimates of the occurrence of exclusive homosexuality range from one to twenty percent of the population, usually finding there are slightly more gay men than lesbians.

Estimates of the frequency of homosexual activity also vary from one country to another. A 1992 study reported that 6.1% of males in Britain had had a homosexual experience, while in France the number was 4.1%. According to a 2003 survey, 12% of Norwegians have had homosexual sex. In New Zealand, a 2006 study suggested that 20% of the population anonymously reported some homosexual feelings, few of them identifying as homosexual. Percentage of persons identifying homosexual was 2–3%. According to a 2008 poll, while only 6% of Britons define their sexual orientation as homosexual or bisexual, more than twice that number (13%) of Britons have had some form of sexual contact with someone of the same sex.

In the United States, according to exit polling on 2008 Election Day for the 2008 Presidential elections, 4% of electorate self-identified as gay, lesbian, or bisexual, the same percentage as in 2004." An estimated 34,000 homosexuals who are in a relationship are employed by the federal government.

== Law ==
Worldwide laws regarding same-sex intercourse, unions and expression. Same-sex intercourse legal. Recognition of unions: Marriage / Extraterritorial marriage^{2}; Civil unions / Limited domestic; Limited foreign / Optional certification; Same-sex intercourse illegal. Penalties: Death / Prison; death not enforced; Death under militias / Prison, with arrests or detention; Prison, not enforced^{1}; Same-sex intercourse Restricted/Ambiguous. Depends are: No data / Restriction of expression, not enforced; Restriction of association with arrests or detention^{1}No imprisonment in the past three years or moratorium on law.^{2}Marriage not available locally. Some jurisdictions may perform other types of partnerships.

Most nations do not impede consensual sex between unrelated persons above the local age of consent. Some jurisdictions further recognize identical rights, protections, and privileges for the family structures of same-sex couples, including marriage. Some nations mandate that all individuals restrict themselves to heterosexual relationships; that is, in some jurisdictions homosexual activity is illegal. Offenders can face the death penalty in some fundamentalist Muslim areas such as Iran and parts of Nigeria. There are, however, often significant differences between official policy and real-world enforcement. See Violence against LGBT people.

Although homosexual acts were decriminalized in some parts of the Western world, such as Poland in 1932, Denmark in 1933, Sweden in 1944, and the United Kingdom in 1967, it was not until the mid-1970s that the gay community first began to achieve limited civil rights in some developed countries. On July 2, 2009, homosexuality was decriminalized in India by a High Court ruling. A turning point was reached in 1973 when the American Psychiatric Association removed homosexuality from the Diagnostic and Statistical Manual of Mental Disorders, thus negating its previous definition of homosexuality as a clinical mental disorder. In 1977, Quebec became the first state-level jurisdiction in the world to prohibit discrimination on the grounds of sexual orientation. During the 1980s and 1990s, most developed countries enacted laws decriminalizing homosexual behavior and prohibiting discrimination against lesbian and gay people in employment, housing, and services. On the other hand, many countries today in the Middle East and Africa, as well as several countries in Asia, the Caribbean and the South Pacific, outlaw homosexuality. In six countries, homosexual behavior is punishable by life imprisonment; in ten others, it carries the death penalty.

- Employment discrimination refers to discriminatory employment practices such as bias in hiring, promotion, job assignment, termination, and compensation, and various types of harassment. In the United States there is "very little statutory, common law, and case law establishing employment discrimination based upon sexual orientation as a legal wrong." Some exceptions and alternative legal strategies are available. President Bill Clinton's Executive Order 13087 (1998) prohibits discrimination based on sexual orientation in the competitive service of the federal civilian workforce, and federal non-civil service employees may have recourse under the Due Process Clause of the U.S. Constitution. Private sector workers may have a Title VII action under a quid pro quo sexual harassment theory, a "hostile work environment" theory, a sexual stereotyping theory, or others.
- Housing discrimination refers to discrimination against potential or current tenants by landlords. In the United States, there is no federal law against such discrimination on the basis of sexual orientation or gender identity, but at least thirteen states and many major cities have enacted laws prohibiting it.
- Hate crimes (also known as bias crimes) are crimes motivated by bias against an identifiable social group, usually groups defined by race, religion, sexual orientation, disability, ethnicity, nationality, age, gender, gender identity, or political affiliation. In the United States, 45 states and the District of Columbia have statutes criminalizing various types of bias-motivated violence or intimidation (the exceptions are AZ, GA, IN, SC, and WY). Each of these statutes covers bias on the basis of race, religion, and ethnicity; 32 of them cover sexual orientation, 28 cover gender, and 11 cover transgender/gender-identity. In October 2009, the Matthew Shepard and James Byrd, Jr. Hate Crimes Prevention Act, which "...gives the Justice Department the power to investigate and prosecute bias-motivated violence where the perpetrator has selected the victim because of the person's actual or perceived race, color, religion, national origin, gender, sexual orientation, gender identity or disability," was signed into law and makes hate crime based on sexual orientation, amongst other offenses, a federal crime in the United States.

== Political activism ==
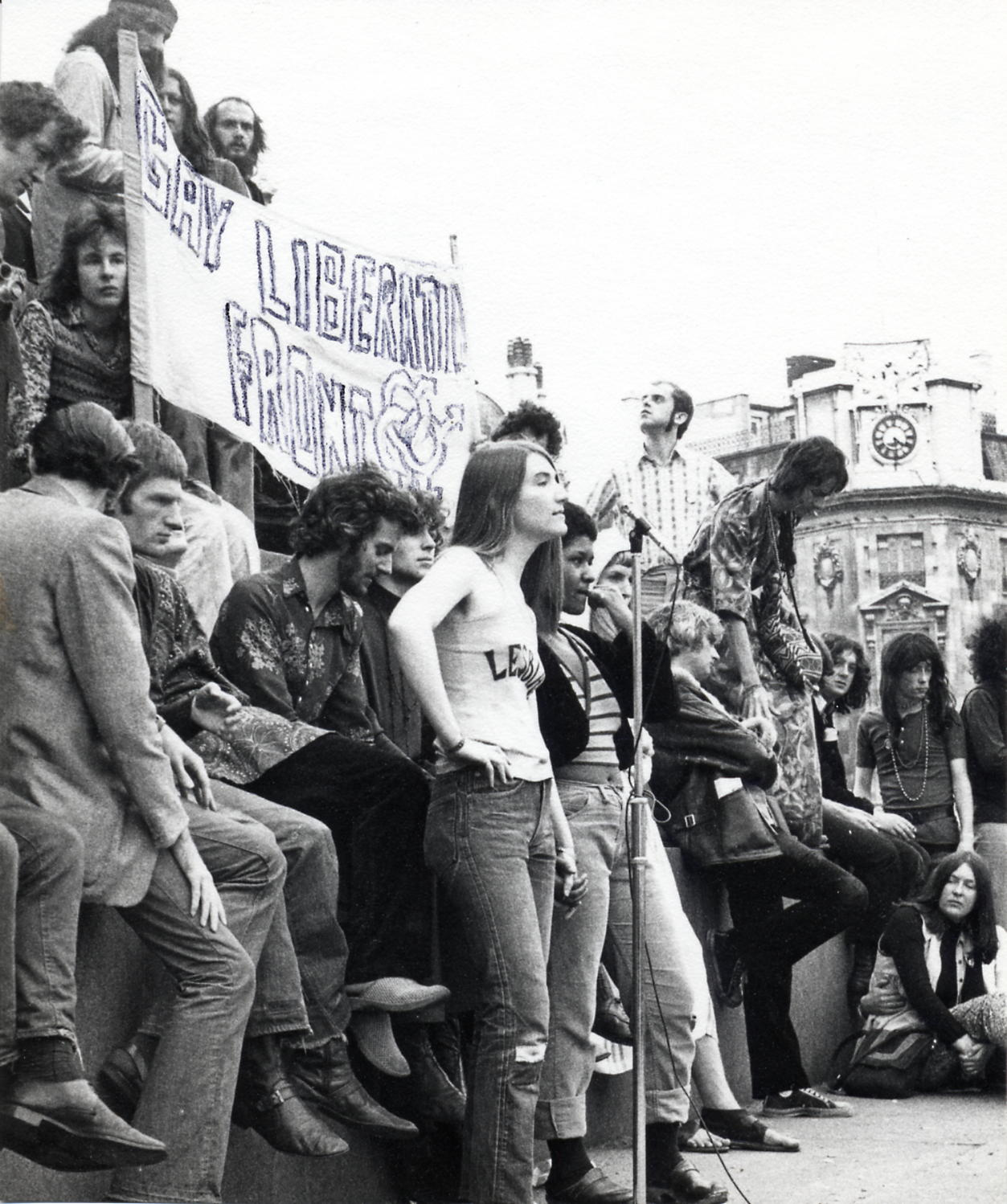
Demonstration for gay rights in London in 1971.

Since the 1960s, many LGBT people in the West, particularly those in major metropolitan areas, have developed a so-called gay culture. To many, gay culture is exemplified by the gay pride movement, with annual parades and displays of rainbow flags. Yet not all LGBT people choose to participate in "queer culture", and many gay men and women specifically decline to do so. To some it seems to be a frivolous display, perpetuating gay stereotypes. To some others, the gay culture represents heterophobia and is scorned as widening the gulf between gay and non-gay people.

With the outbreak of AIDS in the early 1980s, many LGBT groups and individuals organized campaigns to promote efforts in AIDS education, prevention, research, patient support, and community outreach, as well as to demand government support for these programs. Gay Men's Health Crisis, Project Inform, and ACT UP are some notable American examples of the LGBT community's response to the AIDS crisis.

The bewildering death toll wrought by the AIDS epidemic at first seemed to slow the progress of the gay rights movement, but in time it galvanized some parts of the LGBT community into community service and political action, and challenged the heterosexual community to respond compassionately. Major American motion pictures from this period that dramatized the response of individuals and communities to the AIDS crisis include An Early Frost (1985), Longtime Companion (1990), And the Band Played On (1993), Philadelphia (1993), and Common Threads: Stories from the Quilt (1989), the last referring to the NAMES Project AIDS Memorial Quilt, last displayed in its entirety on the Mall in Washington, D.C., in 1996.

Publicly gay politicians have attained numerous government posts, even in countries that had sodomy laws in their recent past. Examples include Guido Westerwelle, Germany's Vice-Chancellor; Peter Mandelson, a British Labour Party cabinet minister and Per-Kristian Foss, formerly Norwegian Minister of Finance.

LGBT movements are opposed by a variety of individuals and organizations. Some social conservatives believe that all sexual relationships with people other than an opposite-sex spouse undermine the traditional family and that children should be reared in homes with both a father and a mother. There is concern that gay rights may conflict with individuals' freedom of speech, religious freedoms in the workplace, the ability to run churches, charitable organizations and other religious organizations in accordance with one's religious views, and that the acceptance of homosexual relationships by religious organizations might be forced through threatening to remove the tax-exempt status of churches whose views don't align with those of the government.

Critics charge that political correctness has led to the association of sex between males and HIV being downplayed.

== Relationships ==
In 2006, the American Psychological Association, American Psychiatric Association and National Association of Social Workers stated in an amicus brief presented to the Supreme Court of California: "Gay men and lesbians form stable, committed relationships that are equivalent to heterosexual relationships in essential respects. The institution of marriage offers social, psychological, and health benefits that are denied to same-sex couples. By denying same-sex couples the right to marry, the state reinforces and perpetuates the stigma historically associated with homosexuality. Homosexuality remains stigmatized, and this stigma has negative consequences. California's prohibition on marriage for same-sex couples reflects and reinforces this stigma". They concluded: "There is no scientific basis for distinguishing between same-sex couples and heterosexual couples with respect to the legal rights, obligations, benefits, and burdens conferred by civil marriage."

== Military service ==
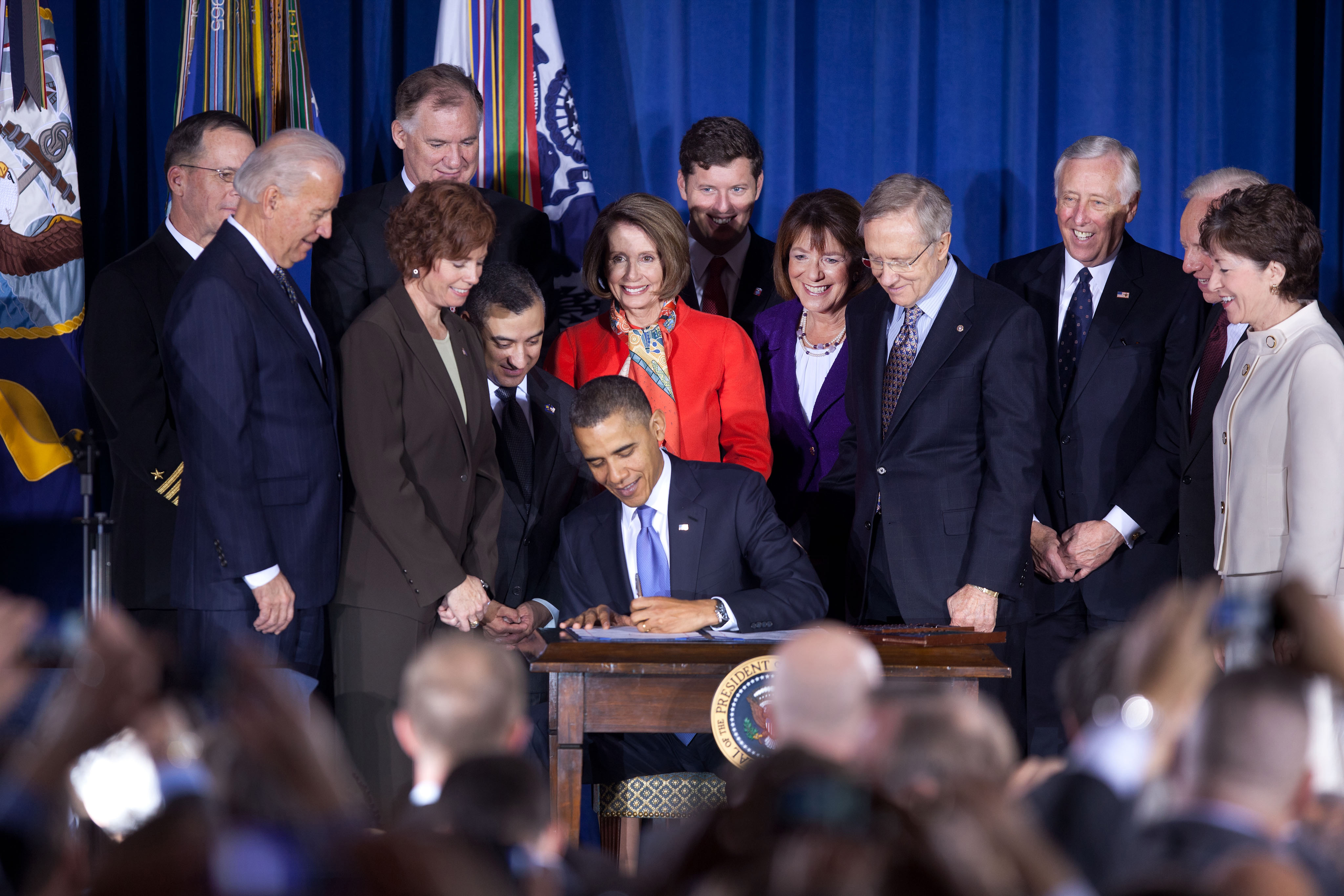
Barack Obama signing the repeal of 'Don't Ask, Don't Tell', a policy that forbid gay and lesbian people from openly serving in the United States armed forces.

Policies and attitudes toward gay and lesbian military personnel vary widely around the world. Some countries allow gay men, lesbians, and bisexual people to serve openly and have granted them the same rights and privileges as their heterosexual counterparts. Many countries neither ban nor support LGB service members. A few countries continue to ban homosexual personnel outright.

Most Western military forces have removed policies excluding sexual minority members. Of the 26 countries that participate militarily in NATO, more than 20 permit openly gay, lesbian and bisexual people to serve. Of the permanent members of the United Nations Security Council, three (United Kingdom, France, the United States) do so. The other three generally do not: China bans gay and lesbian people outright, Russia excludes all gay and lesbian people during peacetime but allows some gay men to serve in wartime (see below). Israel is the only country in the Middle East region that allows openly LGB people to serve in the military.

Prior to the repeal of Don't Ask Don't Tell, the question of homosexuality in the military was highly politicized in the United States. However, such politicization did not occur in many other countries, as sexuality in these cultures is considered a more personal aspect of one's identity than in the United States.

According to American Psychological Association empirical evidence fails to show that sexual orientation is germane to any aspect of military effectiveness including unit cohesion, morale, recruitment and retention. Sexual orientation is irrelevant to task cohesion, the only type of cohesion that critically predicts the team's military readiness and success.

On March 18, 2010, after U.S. President Obama announced that he wanted to put an end to the Don't Ask, Don't Tell policy, former U.S. general and high ranking NATO official John Sheehan blamed homosexuals serving in the Dutch military for the fall of Srebrenica to Serb militias in the Bosnian War fifteen years earlier, stating that homosexuals had weakened the Dutch UN battalion charged with protecting the enclave. In the U.S. Senate, Sheehan said that European countries had tried to "socialize" their armed forces by letting people serve in the army too easily, which according to him, left them weakened. He claimed that his opinion was shared by the leadership of the Dutch armed forces, mentioning the name "Hankman Berman", most probably referring to the then chief of the Dutch defence staff, Henk van den Breemen. Dutch authorities dismissed Sheehan's statements as "disgraceful" and "total nonsense".

== Religion ==
Though the relationship between homosexuality and religion can vary greatly across time and place, within and between different religions and sects, and regarding different forms of homosexuality and bisexuality, current authoritative bodies and doctrines of the world's largest religions generally view homosexuality negatively. This can range from quietly discouraging homosexual activity, to explicitly forbidding same-sex sexual practices among adherents and actively opposing social acceptance of homosexuality. Some teach that homosexual orientation itself is sinful, while others assert that only the sexual act is a sin. Some claim that homosexuality can be overcome through religious faith and practice. On the other hand, voices exist within many of these religions that view homosexuality more positively, and liberal religious denominations may bless same-sex marriages. Some view same-sex love and sexuality as sacred, and a mythology of same-sex love can be found around the world. Regardless of their position on homosexuality, many people of faith look to both sacred texts and tradition for guidance on this issue. However, the authority of various traditions or scriptural passages and the correctness of translations and interpretations are hotly disputed.

== Heterosexism and homophobia ==
In many cultures, homosexual people are frequently subject to prejudice and discrimination. Like members of many other minority groups that are the objects of prejudice, they are also subject to stereotyping, which further adds to marginalization. The prejudice, discrimination and stereotyping are all likely tied to forms of homophobia and heterosexism, which is negative attitudes, bias, and discrimination in favor of opposite-sex sexuality and relationships. Heterosexism can include the presumption that everyone is heterosexual or that opposite-sex attractions and relationships are the norm and therefore superior. Homophobia is a fear of, aversion to, or discrimination against homosexual people. It manifests in different forms, and a number of different types have been postulated, among which are internalized homophobia, social homophobia, emotional homophobia, rationalized homophobia, and others. Similar is lesbophobia (specifically targeting lesbians) and biphobia (against bisexual people). When such attitudes manifest as crimes they are often called hate crimes and gay bashing.

Negative stereotypes characterize LGB people as less romantically stable, more promiscuous and more likely to abuse children, but there is no scientific basic to such assertions. Gay men and lesbians form stable, committed relationships that are equivalent to heterosexual relationships in essential respects. Sexual orientation does not affect the likelihood that people will abuse children. Claims that there is scientific evidence to support an association between being gay and being a pedophile are based on misuses of those terms and misrepresentation of the actual evidence.

=== Violence against gay and lesbian people ===
In the United States, the FBI reported that 15.6% of hate crimes reported to police in 2004 were based on perceived sexual orientation. Sixty-one percent of these attacks were against gay men. The 1998 murder of Matthew Shepard, a gay student, is one of the most notorious incidents in the U.S.

== Parenting ==
LGBT parenting is when lesbian, gay, bisexual, and transgender (LGBT) people are parents to one or more children, either as biological or non-biological parents. Gay men face options which include: "foster care, variations of domestic and international adoption, diverse forms of surrogacy (whether "traditional" or gestational), and kinship arrangements, wherein they might coparent with a woman or women with whom they are intimately but not sexually involved." LGBT parents can also include single people who are parenting; to a lesser extent, the term sometimes refers to families with LGBT children.

In the 2000 U.S. census, 33 percent of female same-sex couple households and 22 percent of male same-sex couple households reported at least one child under eighteen living in their home. Some children do not know they have an LGB parent; coming out issues vary and some parents may never come out to their children. LGBT parenting in general, and adoption by LGBT couples may be controversial in some countries. In January 2008, the European Court of Human Rights ruled that same-sex couples have the right to adopt a child. In the U.S., LGB people can legally adopt in all states except for Florida.

Although it is sometimes asserted in policy debates that heterosexual couples are inherently better parents than same-sex couples, or that the children of lesbian or gay parents fare worse than children raised by heterosexual parents, those assertions find no support in the scientific research literature. There is ample evidence to show that children raised by same-gender parents fare as well as those raised by heterosexual parents. More than 25 years of research have documented that there is no relationship between parents' sexual orientation and any measure of a child's emotional, psychosocial, and behavioral adjustment. These data have demonstrated no risk to children as a result of growing up in a family with 1 or more gay parents. No research supports the widely held conviction that the gender of parents matters for child well-being. It is well-established that both men and women have the capacity to be good parents, and that having parents of both genders does not enhance adjustment. The methodologies used in the major studies of same-sex parenting meet the standards for research in the field of developmental psychology and psychology generally. They constitute the type of research that members of the respective professions consider reliable.

The family studies literature indicates that it is family processes (such as the quality of parenting and relationships within the family) that contribute to determining children's well-being and 'outcomes', rather than family structures, per se, such as the number, gender, sexuality and co-habitation status of parents. If gay, lesbian, or bisexual parents were inherently less capable than otherwise comparable heterosexual parents, their children would evidence problems regardless of the type of sample. This pattern clearly has not been observed. Given the consistent failures in this research literature to disprove the null hypothesis, the burden of empirical proof is on those who argue that the children of sexual minority parents fare worse than the children of heterosexual parents.

Professor Judith Stacey, of New York University, stated: "Rarely is there as much consensus in any area of social science as in the case of gay parenting, which is why the American Academy of Pediatrics and all of the major professional organizations with expertise in child welfare have issued reports and resolutions in support of gay and lesbian parental rights". These organizations include the American Academy of Pediatrics, the American Academy of Child and Adolescent Psychiatry, the American Psychiatric Association, the American Psychological Association, the American Psychoanalytic Association, the National Association of Social Workers, the Child Welfare League of America, the North American Council on Adoptable Children, and Canadian Psychological Association (CPA). CPA is concerned that some persons and institutions are mis-interpreting the findings of psychological research to support their positions, when their positions are more accurately based on other systems of belief or values.

The vast majority of families in the United States today are not the "middle-class family with a bread-winning father and a stay-at-home mother, married to each other and raising their biological children" that has been viewed as the norm. Since the end of the 1980s, it has been well established that children and adolescents can adjust just as well in nontraditional settings as in traditional settings.

== See also ==
- Decriminalization of homosexuality
- Legal status of same-sex marriage
- Societal attitudes toward homosexuality
- Timeline of LGBT history
