= Jean Diot and Bruno Lenoir =

Last French men sentenced to death for homosexuality

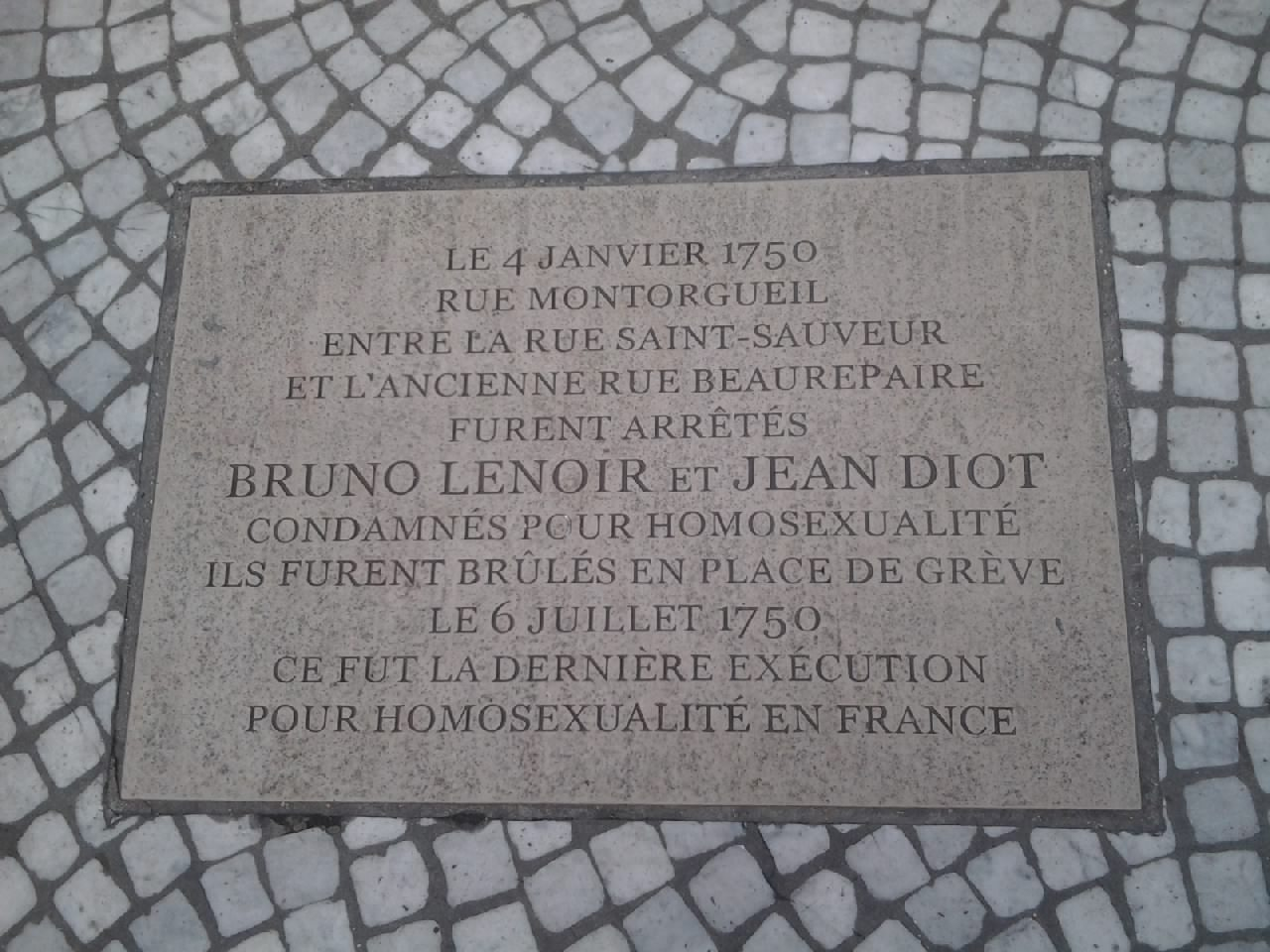
Memorial plaque dedicated to Diot and Lenoir in Paris

Jean Diot and Bruno Lenoir were two French men arrested and charged with the crime of homosexuality in Paris in 1750. They were the last persons executed in France as punishment for homosexuality. In 2014, Paris officials installed a memorial plaque at the site of their arrest.

== History ==
Late at night on 4 January 1750, a city watchman happened upon two men engaged in sex on the rue Montorgueil. The men were Jean Diot (1709-1750,) 40 years old, who worked in a charcuterie close to the rue Montorgueil, and Bruno Lenoir, 23 (1726-1750,) a cordwainer (shoemaker) in the neighbourhood. The watchman had them arrested and imprisoned. The indictment said they were behaving "in an indecent and reprehensible manner". After a few days, Lenoir explained that Diot approached him and suggested sex, that he agreed, but they were interrupted by the city watchman. One magistrate described the charges against them as "committing crimes which propriety does not permit us to describe in writing".

Their trial began on 11 April 1750. They were condemned to death on 27 May. They were taken to the place de Grève, the customary place for executions, on 6 July 1750. Their crime was not announced to the assembled crowd. Then at 5 pm they were strangled and burned to death. Edmond Barbier (1689–1771) noted in his journal that the delay in carrying out the sentence made him think it had been commuted. In his view, it was better not to draw attention to this behavior with public punishments "which indeed teach the young what they know nothing about".

They were the last people known to undergo capital punishment in France for the crime of homosexuality. The severity of their sentence was atypical of the period, when the repression of homosexuality was growing less strict. In the rare case of an execution of someone charged with homosexual behavior, he was convicted of other serious crimes, such as murder or rape. More typically, arrests for homosexual behavior resulted in a few days of detention and a reprimand, but the case of Diot and Lenoir came at a time when authorities needed to make a dramatic statement against homosexuality and their lower class origins made them suitable candidates. As Barbier wrote: "These two workmen had no connection with persons of distinction, either at Court or in the city, and since they have apparently not named anyone [of rank], this example was made with no further consequences."

In 1791, France ended the criminalization of sodomy, effectively decriminalizing homosexuality.

== Recognition ==
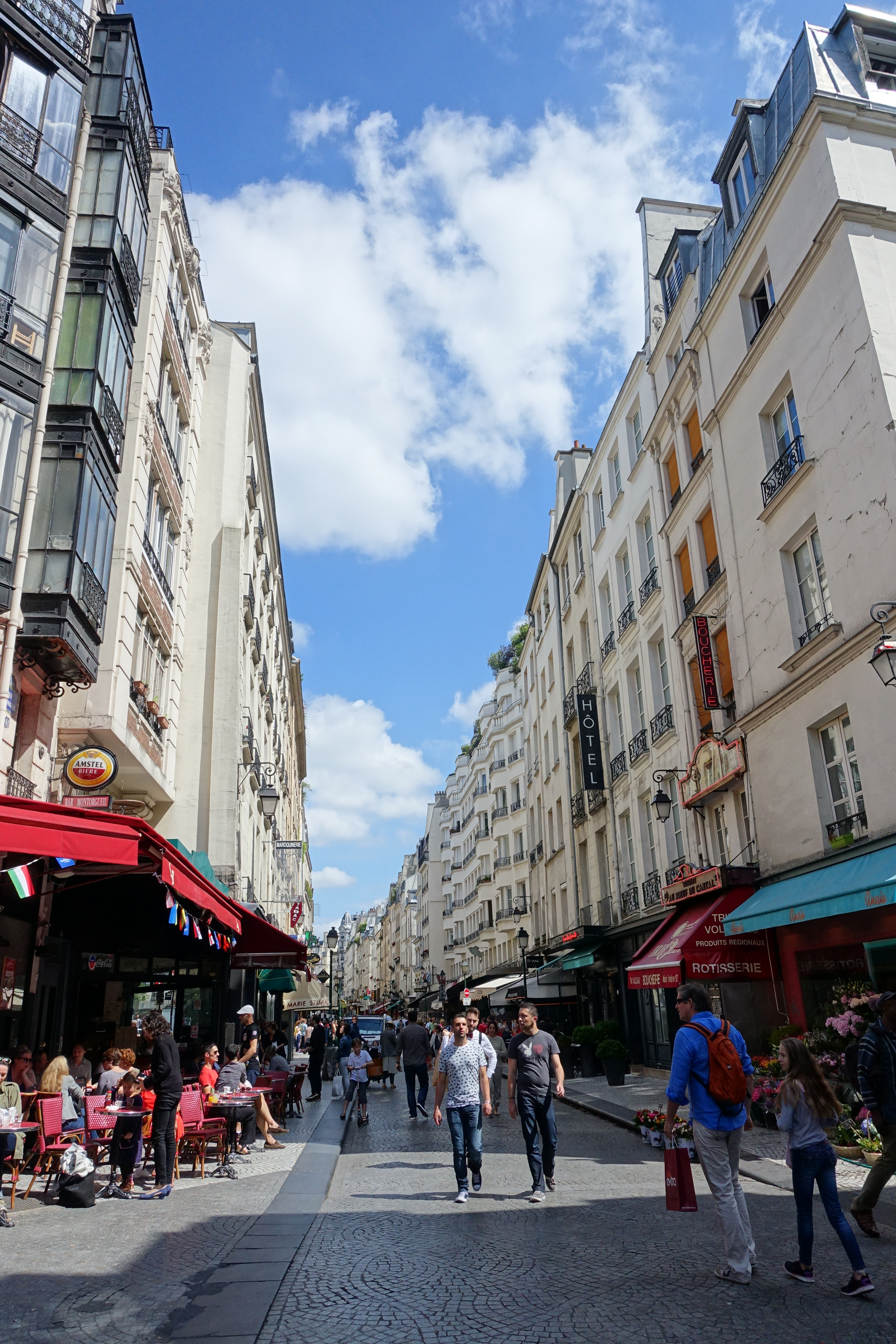
View of the Rue Montorgueil, 2016

The Council of Paris, meeting on 16 and 17 May 2011, agreed that Paris would pay homage to Lenoir and Diot. The city's Department of Cultural Affairs determined to express the council's wish with a memorial plaque, chose a location, and developed its text.

On 18 October 2014, where the rue Montorgueil crosses the rue Bachaumont, a memorial plaque set in the pavement to note the events of 1750 was inaugurated. The text, as authorized by the city's Department of Cultural Affairs, reads:

On 4 January 1750, on the rue Montorgueil between the rue Saint-Sauveur and the old rue Beaurepaire, (Note: The rue Beaurepaire still exists, but it no longer crosses the rue Saint-Sauver.) Bruno Lenoir and Jean Diot were arrested. Charged with homosexuality, they were burned at the place de Grève on 6 July 1750. This was the last execution for homosexuality in France. (punctuation added)

Anne Hidalgo, Mayor of Paris, tweeted two images of the unveiling ceremony with the caption "Homage to Bruno Lenoir & Jean Diot, last couple executed for being homosexual".

In the summer of 2018, when Paris hosted the Gay Games, the plaque was tagged and vandalized twice. A man who claimed credit for one instance claimed to be gay and to hate everything LGBTQ. He was known to the police for making threatening phone calls and associated with the political opposition to same-sex marriage.

== See also ==
- LGBTQ rights in France
- Capital punishment for homosexuality
