= Margarida Borràs =

Margarida Borràs is the assumed name of a transgender woman executed under anti-sodomy laws in Valencia in 1460. The case has become an icon of LGBT rights in Valencia since 1995, when it was discussed by Vicent Josep Escartí, professor at the University of Valencia and the Margarida Borràs Award was created for "persons and institutions that stand out in the defense of LGBT-rights and against all discrimination on the ground of sexuality or gender". In January 2016, a square in Valencia was named after her.

Margarida Borràs was born Miquel as the son of a wealthy official from Mallorca. She changed her name to Margarida and dressed and lived as a woman in Valencia. Borràs was arrested, subjected to torture, and executed by hanging on 28 July 1460.
