= Antonio Gómez (jurist) =

Spanish jurist & priest (c.1500–c.1572)

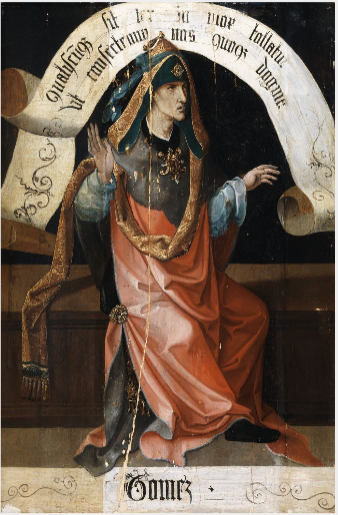
Portrait of Gómez (1510s) — Qualiscumque sit lex in more tollatur / Ut consectemur nos quoque dogma. ("No matter what the law is, it is usually removed, that we may also follow the dogma")

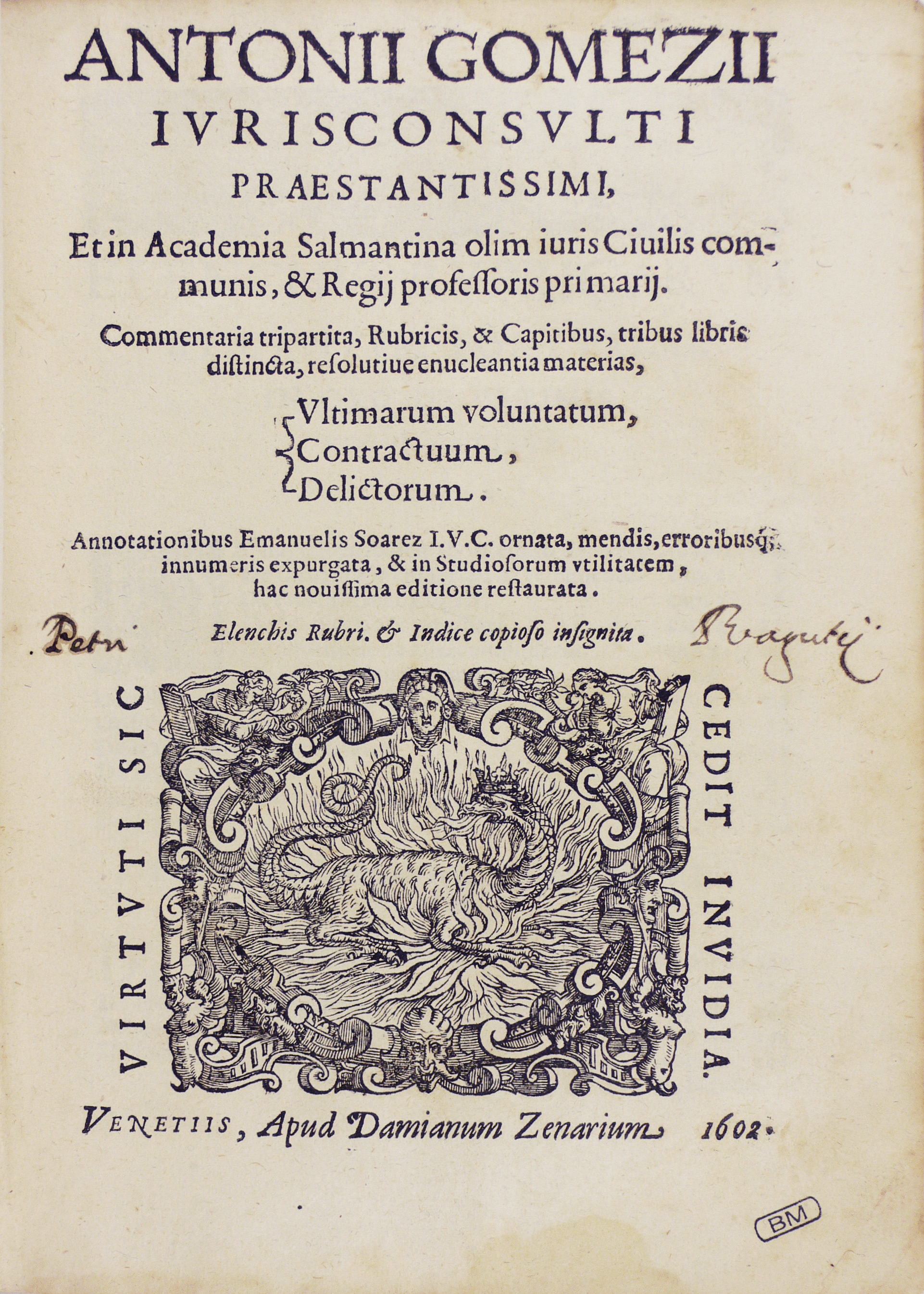
Commentaria tripartita, 1602.

Antonio Gómez (born after 1500; died before 1572) was a Spanish jurist and priest.

After studies at the University of Salamanca, he taught law there and also served as archpriest of Toledo, then the richest diocese in Christendom.

His principal work is his 1555 commentary, Ad leges tauri commentarium absolutissimum, on the Leyes de Toro. These were a set of laws promulgated in Toro governing matters of marriage and inheritance, which remained in force in Castile until the entry into force of the civil code of 1888/89. Gómez's commentary became the most important source for that area of Spanish law, and remained in print until 1780.
