= Plettenberg (disambiguation) =

Plettenberg is a city in North Rhine-Westphalia, Germany.

Plettenberg may also refer to:

- Plettenberg (mountain), a mountain in Baden-Württemberg, Germany
- House of Plettenberg, a German noble family from Westphalia (members see below)

== People with the surname ==
- Ferdinand von Plettenberg (1690–1737), Prime Minister of the Electorate of Cologne
- Friedrich Christian von Plettenberg (1644–1706), prince bishop of Münster
- Georg von Plettenberg (1918-1980), Colonel of the Bundeswehr
- Gertrud von Plettenberg (15??–1608), royal mistress of Prince-Elector-Archbishop of Cologne Ernest of Bavaria
- Joachim van Plettenberg (1739–1793), Governor of the Cape of Good Hope and founder of Plettenberg Bay
- Karl von Plettenberg (1852–1938), General of the Infantry, Commandant-General of the Guards Corps and Adjutant General of the German Kaiser
- Kurt von Plettenberg (1891–1945), plenipotentiary of the House of Hohenzollern (the royal house of Prussia), one of the inner circle of the July 20th plot against Hitler
- Matthieu van Plattenberg (1607/8–1660), Baroque painter, draughtsman, etcher and engraver
- Wolter von Plettenberg (c. 1450–1535), Master of the Livonian Order

== See also ==
- Plettenberg Bay, a town in the Western Cape Province, South Africa
