= Wittem =

- Village
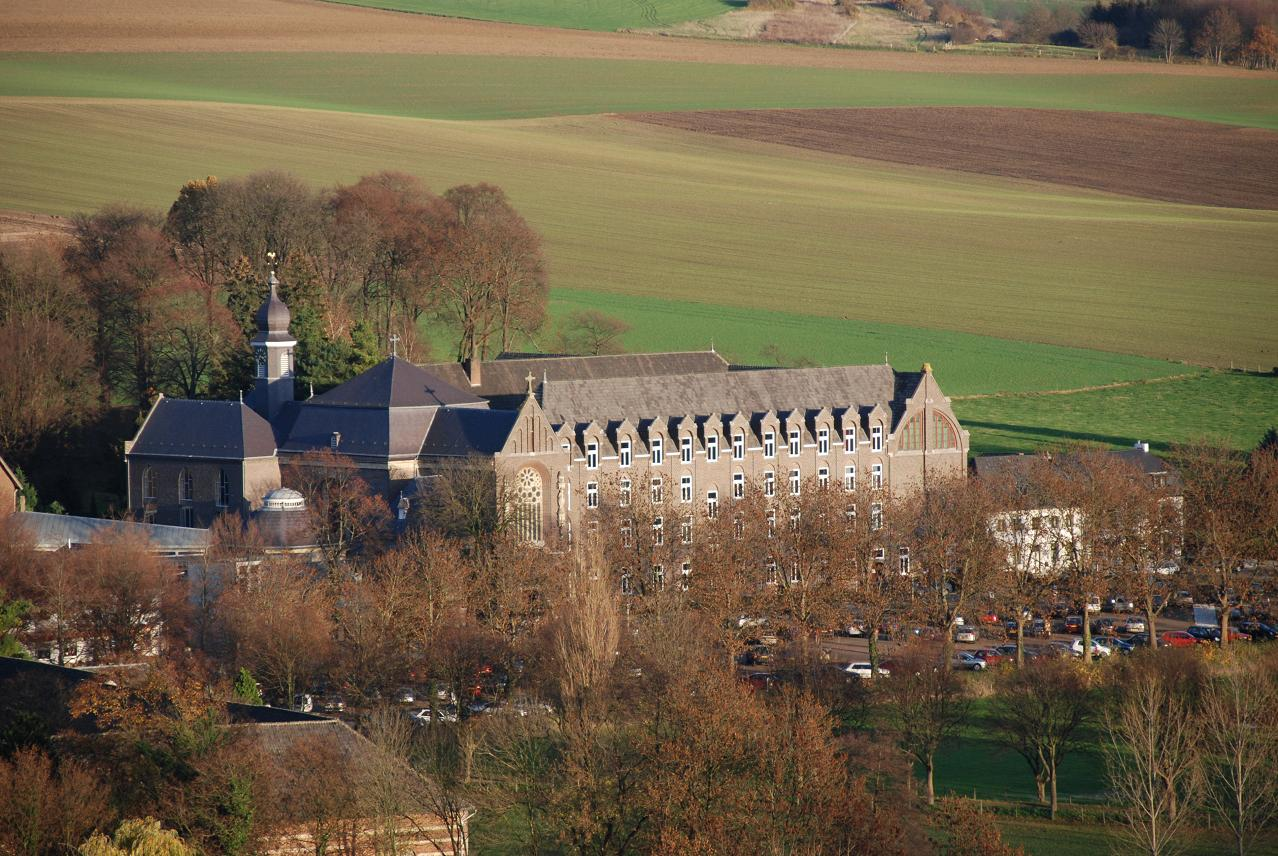
- Monastery at Wittem

- Location in the Netherlands Location in the province of Limburg in the Netherlands
- Coordinates: 50°49′N 5°55′E
- Country: Netherlands
- Province: Limburg
- Municipality: Gulpen-Wittem

Area
  - Total: 0.94 km^{2} (0.36 sq mi)
- Elevation: 93 m (305 ft)

Population (2021)
  - Total: 730
  - Density: 780/km^{2} (2,000/sq mi)
- Time zone: UTC+1 (CET)
  - Summer (DST): UTC+2 (CEST)
- Postal code: 6286
- Dialing code: 043

Wittem (Dutch: [ˈʋɪtəm], Limburgish: [ˈwɪtəm]) is a small village in the Dutch province of Limburg. It is located in the municipality of Gulpen-Wittem.

== History ==
The village was first mentioned in 1125 as Witham, and means "silted land in a bend in a waterway". Wittem developed in the Early Middle Ages. In the 13th century, a castle was built near the confluence of the Selzerbeek with the Geul. It used to be a free heerlijkheid (=no fief), but was bought by Ferdinand von Plettenberg in 1722 and elevated to barony in 1732.

Wittem Castle is surrounded by two moats. The tower and southern wing date from the 13th century. The west wing was added in the 15th century. In 1569, it was damaged by Spanish troops. The southern wing was extended around 1700. In 1968, the castle was restored and converted into a hotel-restaurant.

The Catholic St Alphonsus of Liguori and Johannes Nepomuk Church was built between 1729 and 1733. Between 1845 and 1847, a chapel was added to the south-west side.

Wittem was home to 130 people in 1840. It was a separate municipality until 1999, when it merged with Gulpen.

== Gallery ==
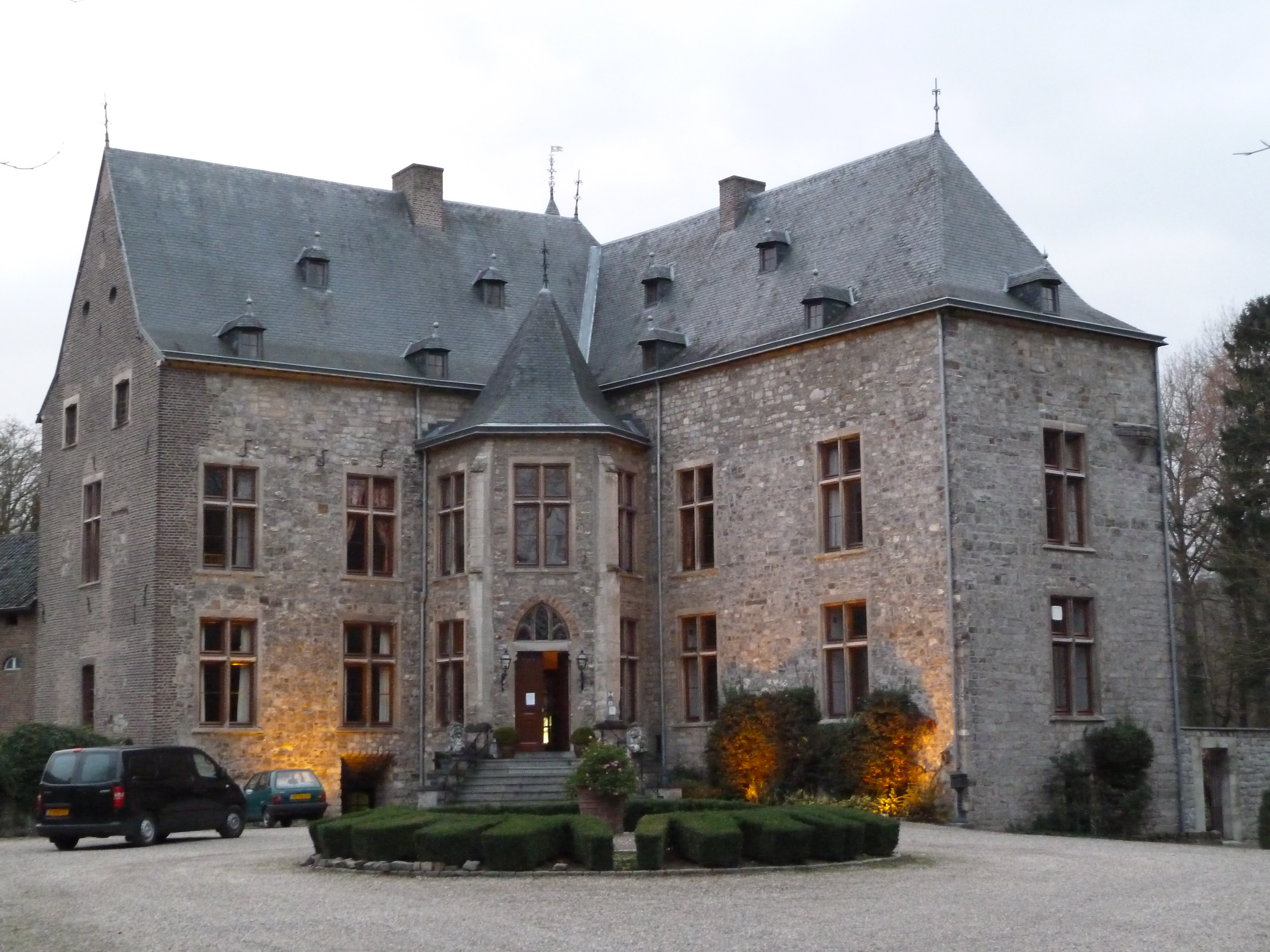
Wittem Castle

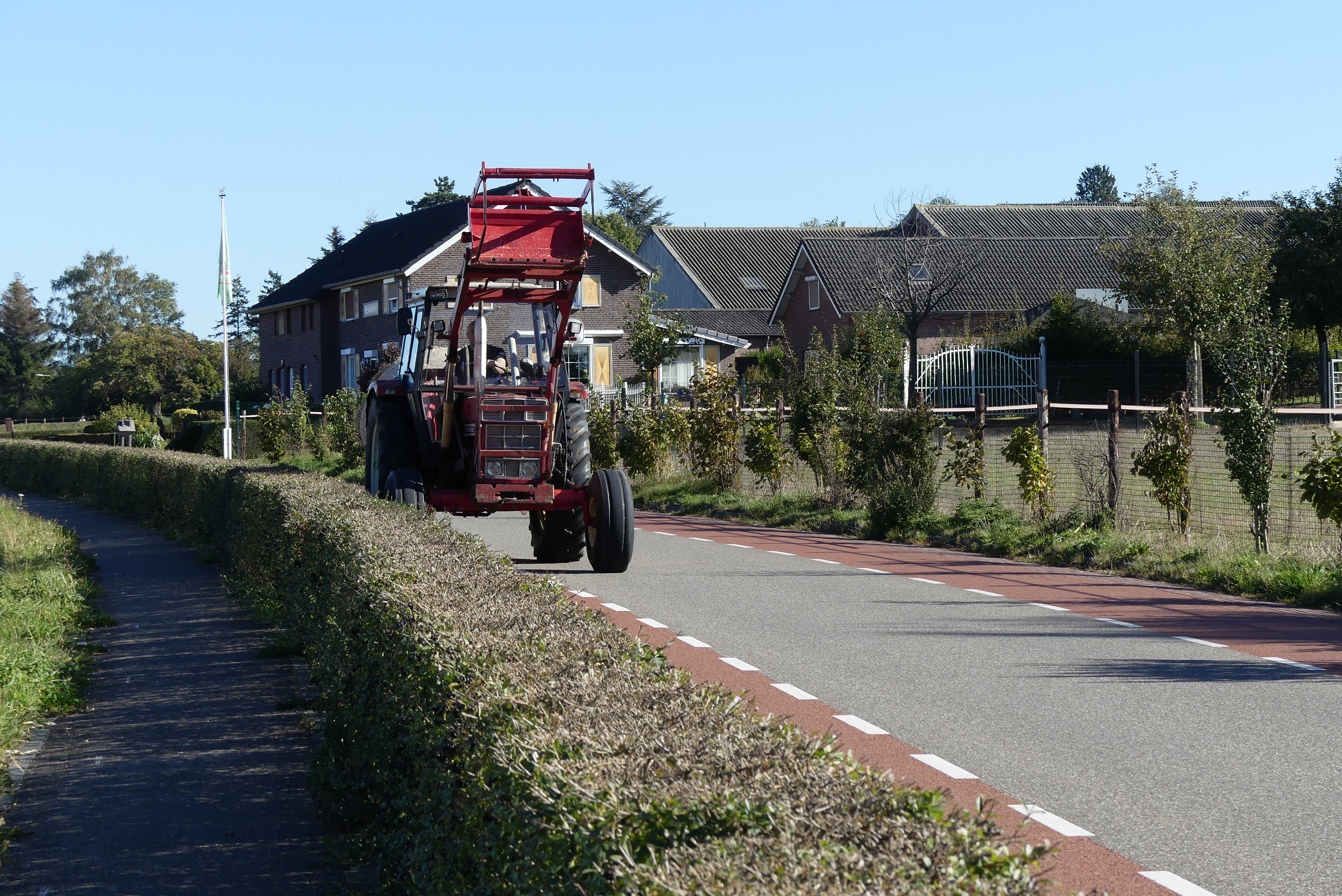
Country road with tractor

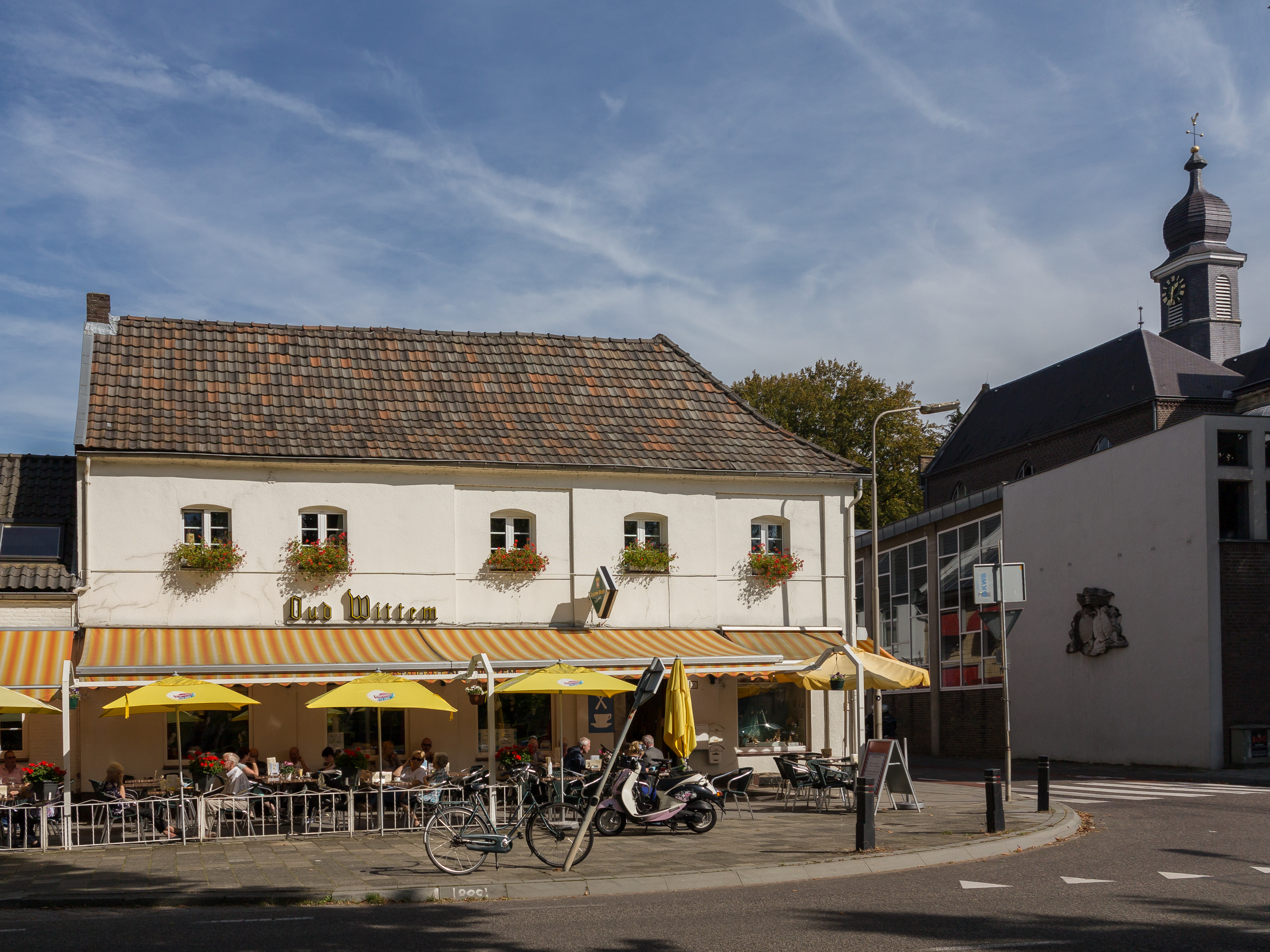
Café-restaurant Oud Wittem

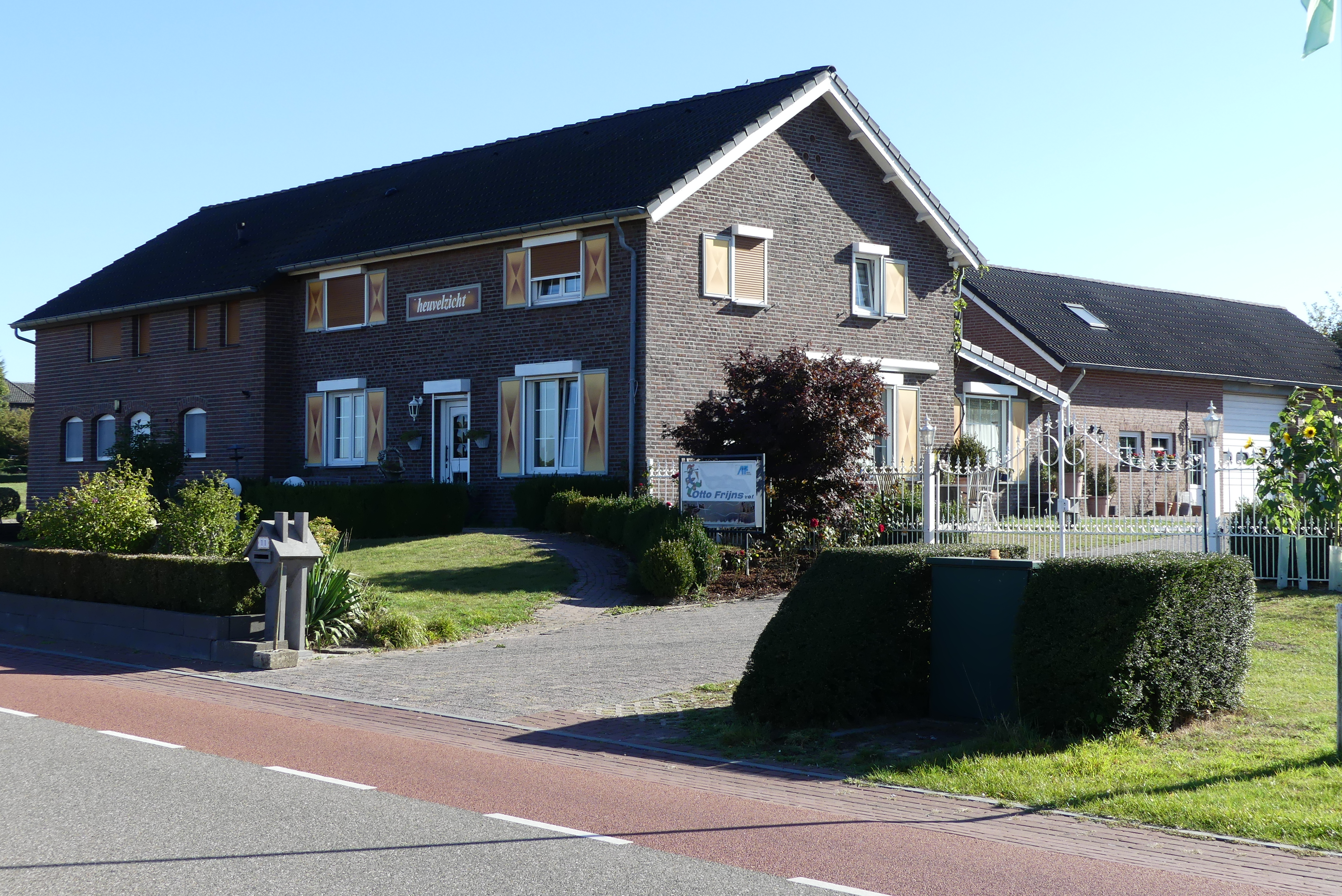
Farm in Wittem
