= Hasso von Boehmer =

German officer and anti-Hitler 20 July Plotter (1904–1945)

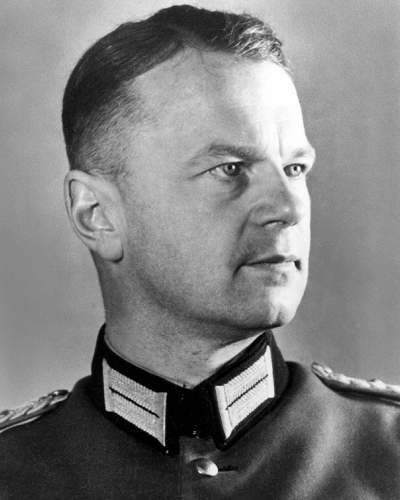
- Official portrait (Military identity card)
- Born: 9 August 1904; Groß Lichterfelde, German Empire
- Died: 5 March 1945 (aged 40); Plötzensee Prison, Berlin, Nazi Germany
- Cause of death: Execution by hanging
- Military career
- Allegiance: Nazi Germany
- Branch: Army
- Rank: Oberstleutnant
- Conflicts: World War II

Hasso von Boehmer (9 August 1904 – 5 March 1945) was a German lieutenant colonel on the General Staff and one of the 20 July Plotters.

Hasso von Boehmer belonged to Infantry Regiment 9 (I.R. 9) from Potsdam, from which also came many of the other plotters. They served, among others, Major General Henning von Tresckow and Fritz-Dietlof von der Schulenburg in the regiment. Altogether, I.R. 9 supplied more plotters for the attempted assassination of German dictator Adolf Hitler and abortive coup d'état than any other regiment in the Wehrmacht.

Hasso von Boehmer was won over to the plotters' cause by Tresckow, and he placed himself at their disposal as a liaison officer in the Wehrkreis ("Defence District") XX (Danzig – Gdańsk, Poland). On the day of the attempt on Hitler's life at the Wolf's Lair in East Prussia, Hasso von Boehmer was accepting all the plotters' teleprinter messages which were reaching him from Berlin. After the news spread that Hitler had survived the attempt, Hasso von Boehmer was arrested the very same day and taken to the prison on Lehrter Straße in Berlin. Owing to an illness, he ended up in the clinic in the Sachsenhausen concentration camp.

On 5 March 1945, the German "People's Court" (Volksgerichtshof) sentenced him to death by hanging for his part in the 20 July Plot. He was executed the same day at Plötzensee Prison in Berlin.
