= Joachim von Willisen =

German public official and member of the Resistance against the Nazi régime

Joachim Freiherr von Willisen
- Born: 31 January 1900; Bärenwalde, West Prussia, German Empire (modern Bincze, Poland)
- Died: 5 April 1983 (aged 83); Munich, Germany
- Other name: Achim von Willisen
- Occupation: forester

Joachim Freiherr von Willisen (31 January 1900 – 5 April 1983) was a German public official and member of the Resistance against the Nazi régime.

== Biography ==
Willisen was born in Bärenwalde, West Prussia, German Empire (modern Bincze, Poland), he served in the German Army in World War I. In 1923 Willisen graduated in forestry and worked in the public forest service.

Willisen became an opponent of the Nazi regime after his uncle Herbert von Bose was murdered in the Night of the Long Knives in 1934. In 1938 he was transferred to the Reich Ministry of Economics and was conscripted to the Wehrmacht Infantry Regiment 9 in Potsdam in World War II, where he met future participants of the 20 July plot. Unfit for service after he was wounded twice, he worked in the Reich Forest Office. Influenced by Fritz-Dietlof von der Schulenburg he became department chief at the Mecklenburg Ministry of State in Schwerin in 1943.

Willisen was designated as a political commissioner in military district II (Stettin) after a successful coup against Hitler. Willisen was arrested on 21 July 1944 after the plot had failed but was released from custody some weeks later because the Gestapo was unable to prove his knowledge about his future role in the plotter's plans. Willisen returned to Schwerin and survived the war.

After World War II Willisen led the forestry office of Reinhausen near Göttingen. He retired in 1964 and died in 1983 in Munich.
