= Klausing =

Klausing is a surname of German origin. Notable people with the surname include:

- Chuck Klausing (1925–2018), American football player and coach
- Friedrich Klausing (1920–1944), German resistance fighter
