= Friedrich Graf von der Schulenburg =

German general and Nazi politician

- Born: 21 November 1865; Bobitz, Mecklenburg, Kingdom of Prussia
- Died: 19 May 1939 (aged 73); Sankt Blasien, Baden, Nazi Germany
- Spouse: Freda-Marie Gräfin von Arnim
- Children: Fritz-Dietlof von der Schulenburg
- Military career
- Allegiance: German Empire; Kingdom of Prussia; Weimar Republic; Nazi Germany
- Branch: Imperial German Army; Prussian Army
- Service years: 1888–1919
- Rank: Generalmajor; SS-Obergruppenführer
- Commands: Garde du Corps; Chief of Staff Guards Corps; Chief of Staff 5th Army; Chief of Staff 6th Army; Chief of Staff Army Group German Crown Prince
- Conflicts: World War I
- Awards: Pour le Mérite with oak leaves

Friedrich Bernhard Karl Gustav Ulrich Erich Graf von der Schulenburg (21 November 1865 – 19 May 1939) was a German professional army officer who became a Royal Prussian Army general during World War I. He became a member of the Nazi Party during the inter-war period and joined the Nazi paramilitary Sturmabteilung (SA) and Schutzstaffel (SS), attaining the rank of SS-Obergruppenführer. He also served as a Nazi Reichstag deputy from 1934 to his death.

== Early life ==
Friedrich Graf von der Schulenburg was born on 21 November 1865 as the second son of Count Werner von der Schulenburg (1832-1880) and his wife, Countess Marie Cäcilie von Maltzahn (1843-1900). Schulenburg entered the Royal Prussian Army in 1888 as a member of the 2nd Guards Uhlans. On 13 December 1888, he was commissioned a Leutnant. In 1890, Schulenburg was attached to the Life Guards. He spent time in the Prussian Staff College. In 1895, Schulenburg was promoted to Oberleutnant. In 1900, he joined the German General Staff and was considered a capable general staff officer. In 1900, Schulenburg was advanced to the rank of Hauptmann. From 1902 to 1906, he served as a military attaché at the German embassy in London. In 1907, Schulenburg was promoted to Major. On 18 February 1913, he became the commander of the Life Guards and aide-de-camp to Wilhelm II. On 2 September 1913, he was promoted to Oberstleutnant.

== First World War ==
At the outbreak of World War I, Schulenburg became the chief of staff of the Guards Corps commanded by Karl von Plettenberg. Schulenburg participated on the western front as part of the Guard Corps, which was part of the 2nd Army. In 1915, Schulenburg was promoted to Oberst. In 1916, Schulenburg became the chief of staff of the 5th Army replacing Konstantin Schmidt von Knobelsdorf, who held extremist political views. For a while, Schulenburg was the chief of staff of the 6th Army of Ludwig von Falkenhausen. In October 1916, he joined Wilhelm, German Crown Prince as chief of staff at the headquarters of the Army Group German Crown Prince. The two developed Operation Alberich which gave Germany some hope of winning the war. On 12 April 1917, Schulenburg received the Pour le Mérite. He added oak leaves on 23 March 1918. In June 1918, Schulenburg was promoted to Generalmajor. Schulenburg advised Wilhelm II to abdicate his title of German Emperor but keep the title of King of Prussia. He also advised Wilhelm II to order the army to fight against the revolutionary forces. Shortly after the end of the war, Schulenburg retired from the army in May 1919 and lived on his estate in Mecklenburg.

== Involvement with the Nazi Party ==
A member of the conservative German National People's Party, Schulenburg was elected as a deputy to the Reichstag from electoral constituency 35 (Mecklenburg) in December 1924 and served until the dissolution of March 1928. He still remained friendly with the former Crown Prince Wilhelm and had some profound political conversations. In December 1931, Schulenburg joined the Nazi Party (membership number 852,947). Since he had a good relationship with Kurt von Schleicher, he advised Adolf Hitler as liaison to the Reichswehr but he was not effective. In 1933, Schulenburg joined the Nazi paramilitary Sturmabteilung (SA) where he served on the Supreme SA Leadership and reached the rank of SA-Oberführer. He survived the Night of the Long Knives purge of 30 June to 2 July 1934 in which high-ranking SA officers were killed. In August 1934, he was appointed to a Reichstag vacancy in constituency 6, Pomerania. At the 1936 Reichstag election, he was returned for his former constituency in Mecklenburg, and retained that seat until his death. In March 1936, Schulenburg transferred from the SA to the Schutzstaffel (SS number 162,240) and was promoted to SS-Obergruppenführer on 30 January 1939. He died in Sankt Blasien on 19 May 1939. Hitler attended his funeral and met with Fritz-Dietlof von der Schulenburg, Schulenburg's son, who later joined the resistance.

== Family ==
On 21 July 1897, Schulenburg married Freda-Marie Gräfin von Arnim (1873–1939). They had 6 children:

- Johann Albrecht (1898–1944)
- Wolf-Werner (1899–1944), SA-Brigadeführer
- Adolf-Heinrich (1901–1940), SA-Obersturmführer, married Jutta Freiin von Barnekow (1903–1945). They had two children: Sigrid Freifrau von Diergardt (1924–2013) and Friedrich Werner Graf von der Schulenburg (1927–1967, m. Suzanna/Susanna Huff)
- Fritz-Dietlof (1902–1944)
- Elisabeth (1903–2001)
- Wilhelm (1904–1936)

== Awards and decorations ==
- Kingdom of Prussia: Order Pour le Mérite with Oakleaves
  - Pour le Mérite (24 July 1917)
  - Oakleaves (23 March 1918)
- Kingdom of Prussia: Order of the Red Eagle
  - 2nd Class with Swords, Oakleaves and the Royal Crown (gazetted on 5 October 1918)
  - 4th Class with the Royal Crown (Note: According to Prussian regulations, when a class of the Order of the Red Eagle was awarded with the royal crown, it continued to be worn even when a higher class of the order was awarded.)
- Kingdom of Prussia: Order of the Crown, 3rd Class
- Kingdom of Prussia: Royal House Order of Hohenzollern
  - Knight's Cross with Swords (5 June 1915)
  - Commander's Cross with Swords (gazetted on 12 January 1918)
- Kingdom of Prussia: Order of Saint John, Knight of Justice (Rechtsritter)
- Kingdom of Prussia: Iron Cross (1914) 1st and 2nd Class
- Kingdom of Prussia: Service Decoration Cross for 25 Years' Service
- Kingdom of Prussia: Centenary Medal
- Hohenzollern Principalities: Princely House Order of Hohenzollern, Honor Cross 2nd Class with Swords (9 October 1914)
- Grand Duchy of Baden: Order of the Zähringer Lion, Commander's Cross 2nd Class with Swords (10 January 1918)
- Kingdom of Bavaria: Military Merit Order, 3rd Class with Crown and Swords (30 October 1914)
- Kingdom of Bavaria: Military Merit Order, 3rd Class
- Duchy of Brunswick: Order of Henry the Lion, Knight's Cross 2nd Class
- Principality of Lippe: War Merit Cross
- Grand Duchy of Mecklenburg-Schwerin: House Order of the Wendish Crown, Knight's Cross
- Grand Duchy of Mecklenburg-Schwerin: Order of the Griffon, Knight's Cross
- Grand Duchy of Mecklenburg-Schwerin: Military Merit Cross, 1st and 2nd Class
- Grand Duchy of Oldenburg: House and Merit Order of Peter Frederick Louis, Honor Knight's Cross 2nd Class with the Silver Crown
- Kingdom of Saxony: Albert Order, Knight's Cross 1st Class
- Grand Duchy of Saxe-Weimar-Eisenach: Order of the White Falcon, Knight's Cross 2nd Class
- Saxon Duchies: Ducal Saxe-Ernestine House Order, Commander's Cross 1st Class
- Austria-Hungary: Military Merit Cross, 3rd Class with War Decoration
- Kingdom of Belgium: Order of Leopold II, Commander
- Kingdom of Denmark: Order of the Dannebrog, Knight
- Republic of France: Legion of Honor, Officer
- Kingdom of Greece: Order of the Redeemer, Commander
- United Kingdom of Great Britain and Ireland: Royal Victorian Order, Commander
- Kingdom of Italy: Order of Saints Maurice and Lazarus, Officer
- Kingdom of Romania: Order of the Crown of Romania, Knight
- Kingdom of Sweden: Order of the Sword, Knight
- Kingdom of Thailand: Order of the White Elephant, Officer
- Nazi Germany: Golden Party Badge of the NSDAP (1 April 1938)
