= Bińcze =

- Village
- Location within Poland
- Coordinates: 53°39′5″N 17°8′31″E
- Country: Poland
- Voivodeship: Pomeranian
- County: Człuchów
- Gmina: Czarne
- Population: 535

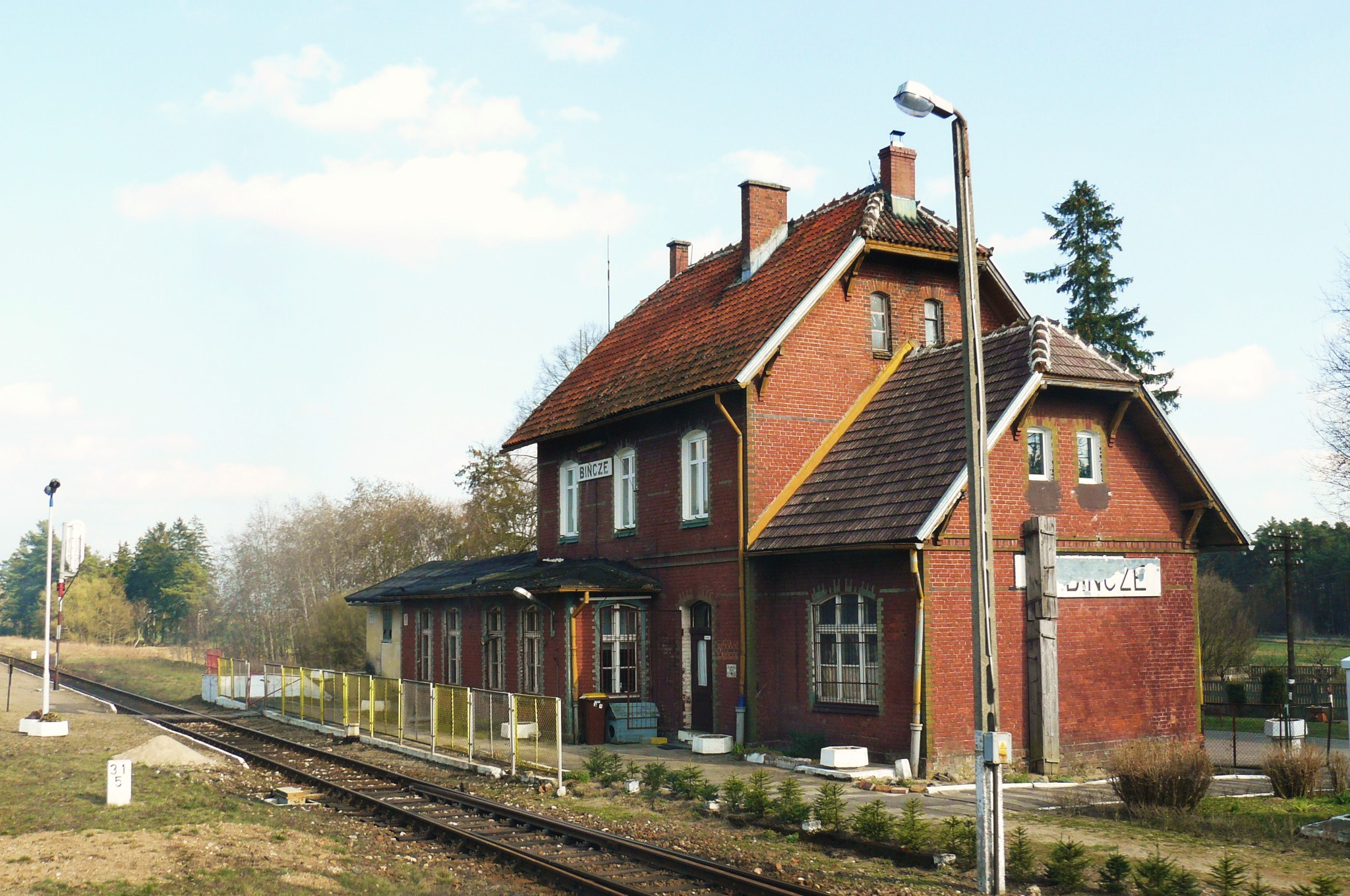

Bińcze [ˈbiɲt͡ʂɛ] is a village in the administrative district of Gmina Czarne, within Człuchów County, Pomeranian Voivodeship, in northern Poland.

Until 1771 it was part of Crown of the Kingdom of Poland, and then of Kingdom of Prussia (First Partition of Poland). For the history of the region, see History of Pomerania. For details of the history of the region, see History of Pomerania.

== Notable residents ==
- Joachim von Willisen (1900-1983), resistance fighter
