= Infantry Regiment 9 Potsdam =

9th Infantry Regiment
- Unit insignia, based on Frederick II of Prussia's monogram
- Active: 1 October 1934 – 14 September 1942; 23 October 1942 – 8 May 1945
- Country: Germany
- Branch: Army
- Type: Infantry
- Part of: 23rd Infantry Division
- Engagements: World War II

Infantry Regiment 9 of Potsdam (I.R. 9) was an infantry regiment in Weimar Republic's Reichswehr and Germany's Wehrmacht, descended from famed 1st Prussian Regiment of Foot Guards in the German Empire's Deutsches Reichsheer. Garrisoned at the cradle of Prussian army and rich with tradition, it was nicknamed 'Count Nine' (Graf Neun) or 'I.R. von 9' by its detractors because of high percentage of Prussian aristocrats and purported arrogance in its ranks.

Today it is most remembered for the fact that nineteen of its officers (or former officers) were involved in conspiracy against Hitler, more by far than any other German regiment. Most of them were executed or committed suicide after the failure of the 20 July plot to assassinate Hitler. Major General Henning von Tresckow and Lieutenant Colonel Fritz-Dietlof von der Schulenburg in particular were central figures in German resistance.

The regiment's tradition is continued by the Wachbataillon of the Bundeswehr.

== Officers who conspired against Hitler ==
Lieutenant Colonel Hasso von Boehmer
Major Axel Freiherr von dem Bussche-Streithorst
Captain Dr. Hans Fritzsche
Lieutenant Colonel Helmuth von Gottberg
Lieutenant Colonel Ludwig Freiherr von Hammerstein
Lieutenant Colonel (res.) Carl-Hans Graf von Hardenberg
Lieutenant General Paul von Hase
Lieutenant Ewald Heinrich von Kleist
Colonel Hans Otfried von Linstow
Captain Friedrich Karl Klausing
Major (res.) Ferdinand Freiherr von Lüninck
Major (res.) Herbert Meyer
Lieutenant Georg-Sigismund von Oppen
Major Kurt Freiherr von Plettenberg
Colonel Alexis Freiherr von Roenne
Lieutenant Colonel (res.) Fritz-Dietlof von der Schulenburg
Lieutenant Colonel Gerd von Tresckow
Major General Henning von Tresckow
Lieutenant Colonel i. G. Hans-Alexander von Voß
Captain (res.) Achim Freiherr von Willisen
Colonel Claus von Stauffenberg
Captain (res.) Richard von Weizsäcker
