= Friedrich Klausing =

Resistance fighter in Nazi Germany (1920–1944)

Friedrich Karl Klausing (24 May 1920 – 8 August 1944) was a resistance fighter in Nazi Germany, and one of the 20 July Plotters.

== Biography ==
Friedrich Klausing was born in Munich, Germany. During his teens he served in the Hitler Youth and Reichsarbeitsdienst (State Labour Service).

== Military career ==
He joined the Wehrmacht in the autumn of 1938, belonged to the Potsdam Infantry Regiment 9 and fought and was wounded at the Battle of Stalingrad. In July 1943 Klausing was wounded again during the Battle of Wolchow (Volkhov) near Lake Ladoga (Leningrad). He was subsequently posted to be an office assistant at the Oberkommando der Wehrmacht and was drawn into the plan to assassinate Hitler by Fritz-Dietlof von der Schulenburg.

On 11 July 1944, on the first attempt on Hitler's life, Klausing went along with Claus Schenk von Stauffenberg as his adjutant to the Obersalzberg (i.e. the Berghof near Berchtesgaden) and made sure that a car and a plane were standing by, ready to whisk the plotters away to Berlin after the job had been done. The Obersalzberg plan was, however, put off, as was a second attempt on 15 July at the Wolf's Lair near Rastenburg in East Prussia, where Klausing made the same preparations for Stauffenberg.

On 20 July, Captain Klausing stayed behind at the Bendlerblock in Berlin while Stauffenberg went to the Wolf's Lair to try again, and was jointly responsible for forwarding Operation Valkyrie orders. He forwarded the orders to, among others, Ewald-Heinrich von Kleist-Schmenzin. On the night of 20–21 July, after it had become apparent that Stauffenberg's briefcase bomb had not killed Hitler, Klausing was the only one to escape the firefight at the Bendlerblock subsequent to which Stauffenberg and several other conspirators were captured, but the next morning, he gave himself up to the Gestapo.

== Death ==
In a show trial before the Volksgerichtshof on 8 August 1944, he was sentenced to death. The sentence was carried out the same day at Plötzensee Prison in Berlin.

== See also ==
- List of members of the 20 July plot
