= Nordkirchen Castle =

Palace in North Rhine Westphalia, Germany

Schloss Nordkirchen
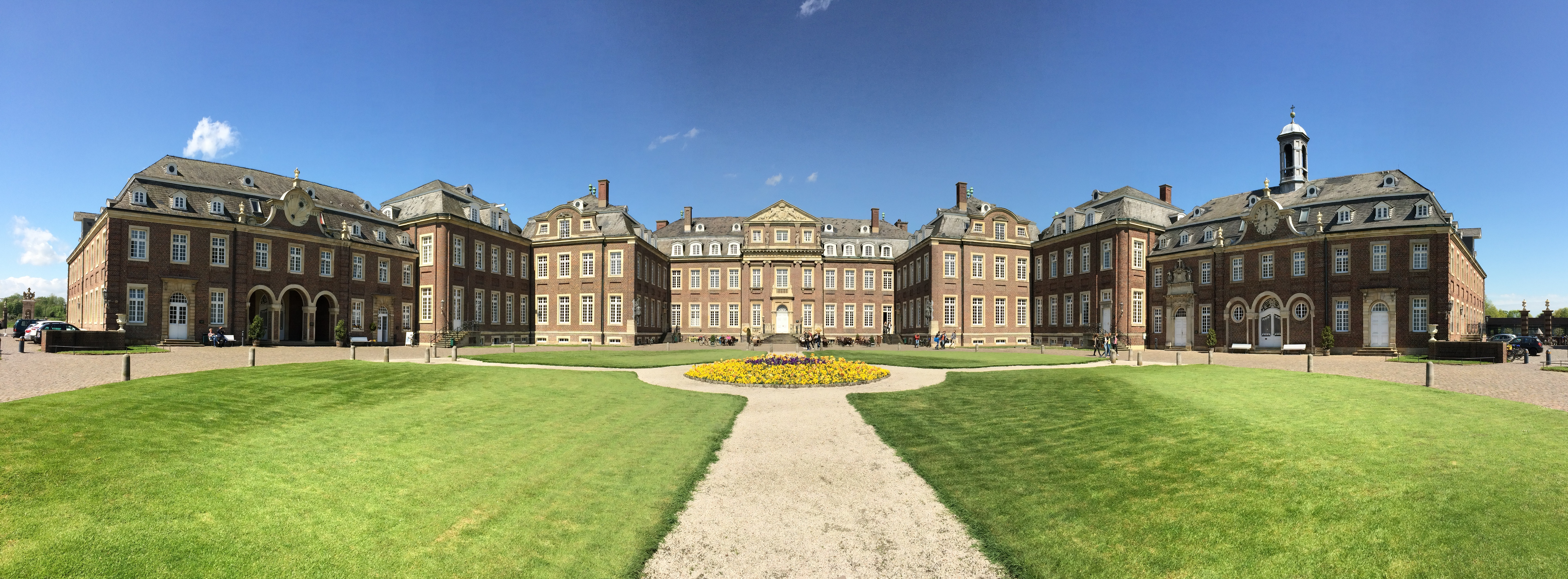
- Main building from the South

- Location within North Rhine-Westphalia

General information
- Location: Schloß 1, 59394 Nordkirchen, Germany, Nordkirchen, Germany
- Coordinates: 51°43′57.36″N 7°32′1.32″E
- Year built: 1703-1734
- Owner: State of Nordrhein-Westfalen

Design and construction
- Architects: Gottfried Laurenz Pictorius, Peter Pictorius the Younger, and Johann Conrad Schlaun

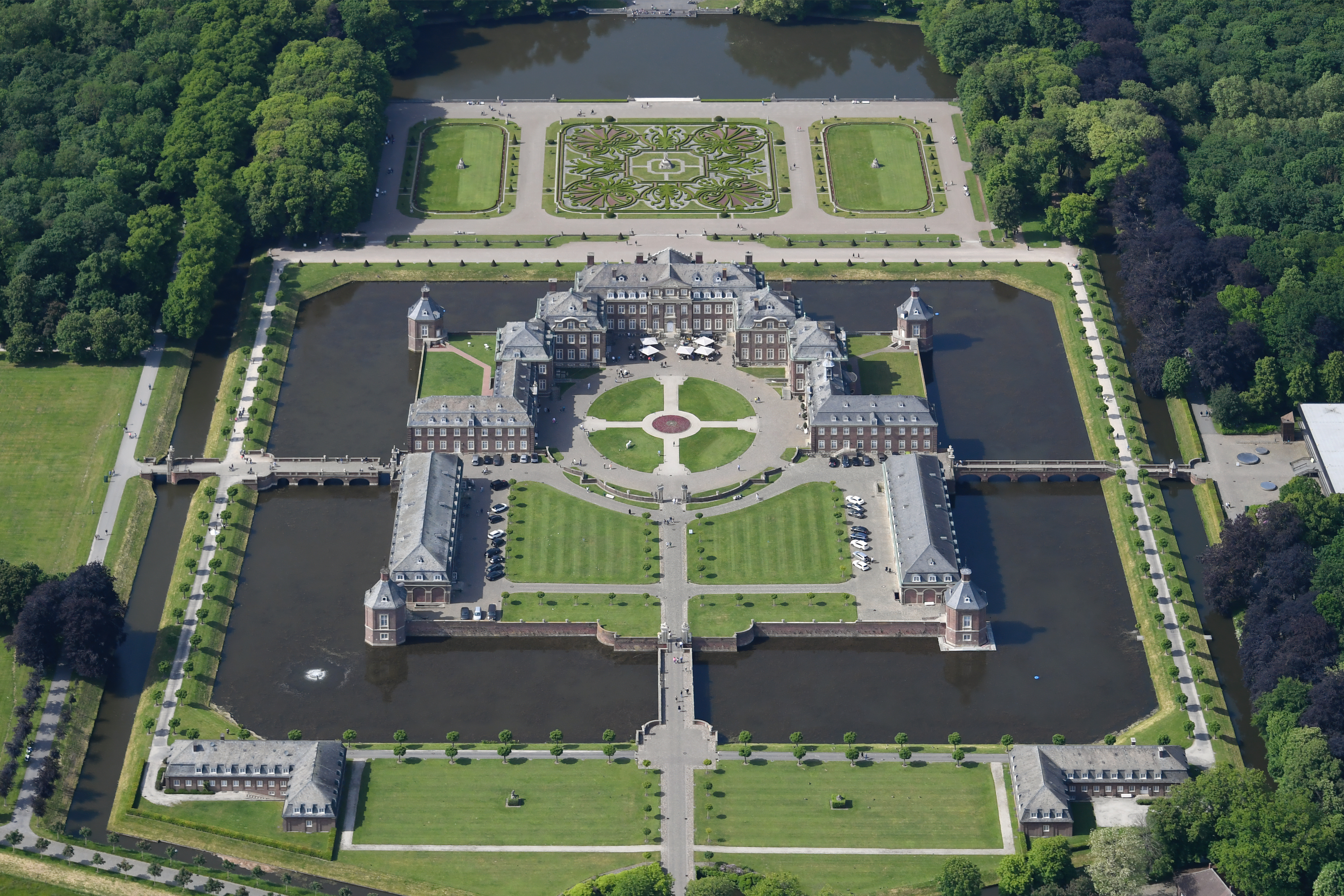
Overhead view

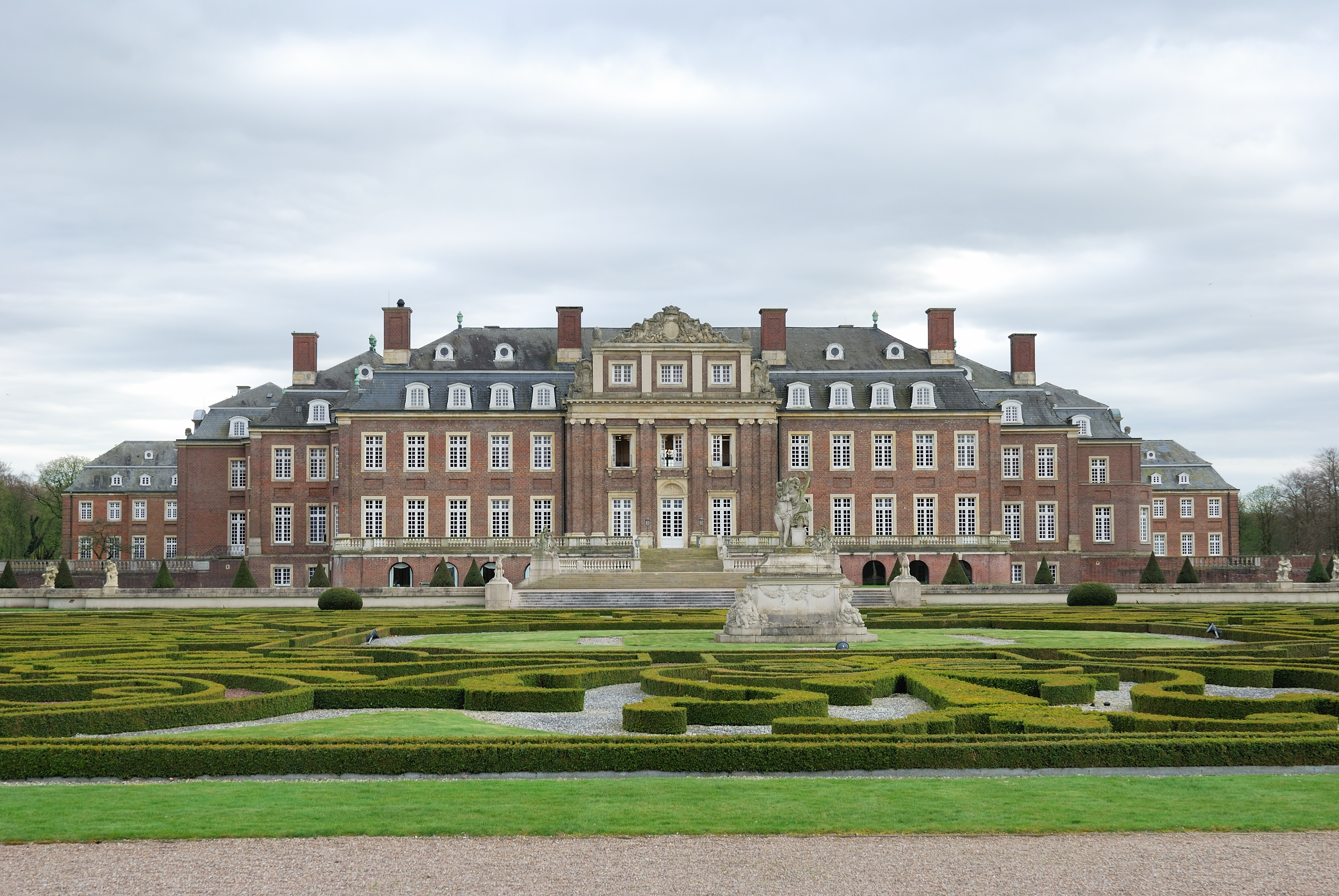
Northern front of Schloss Nordkirchen, facing parterres

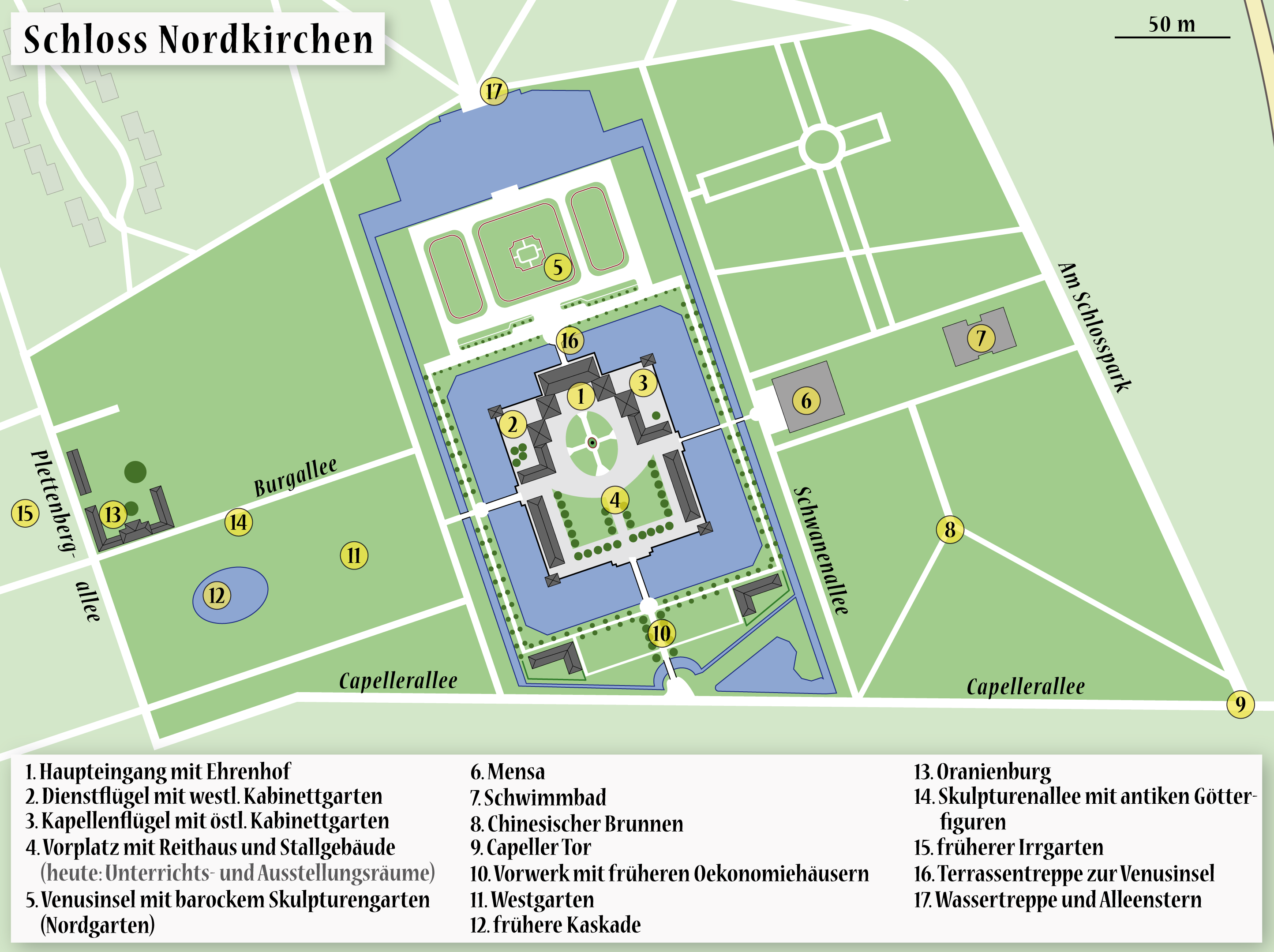
Map of Nordkirchen Castle

Schloss Nordkirchen is a palace situated in the town of Nordkirchen in the Coesfeld administrative district in the state of North Rhine Westphalia, Germany. The schloss was largely built between 1703 and 1734 and is known as the "Versailles of Westphalia" since it is the largest of the fully or partly moated Wasserschlösser in that region. It was originally one of the residences of the Prince-Bishopric of Münster.

== Ownership ==
The present Baroque schloss is the successor to a fully moated Wasserschloss built in the sixteenth century for the noble "von Morrien" family. In the eighteenth century, the structure visible today was raised in several building campaigns for Prince-bishop Friedrich Christian von Plettenberg zu Lenhausen and his successor, Prince-bishop Ferdinand von Plettenberg. In 1833, the complex passed to Count von Esterházy who sold it to Duke Engelbert Marie von Arenberg in 1903. In 1933, the Arenberg-Nordkirchen GmbH, a newly founded ducal assets management company, assumed possession. In 1959, the schloss was purchased by the State of Nordrhein-Westfalen and has since been the site of "Fachhochschule für Finanzen Nordrhein-Westfalen" (recognized University of Applied Sciences of Finances North Rhine Westphalia), a state-run college specializing in the training of future tax inspectors. The neighboring "Oranienburg" complex and the park were subsequently added, as was – in 2004 – the deer park, which included a generous green belt of more than 1,000 hectares of woodland surrounding the south-western perimeter of the schloss proper. Parts of the interior of the schloss are open to the public, as are the parterres and the surrounding park. Inside the schloss, an up-market restaurant offering Westphalian cuisine looks out into the large formal garden that faces the northern façade of the schloss. The schloss chapel may be rented for weddings.

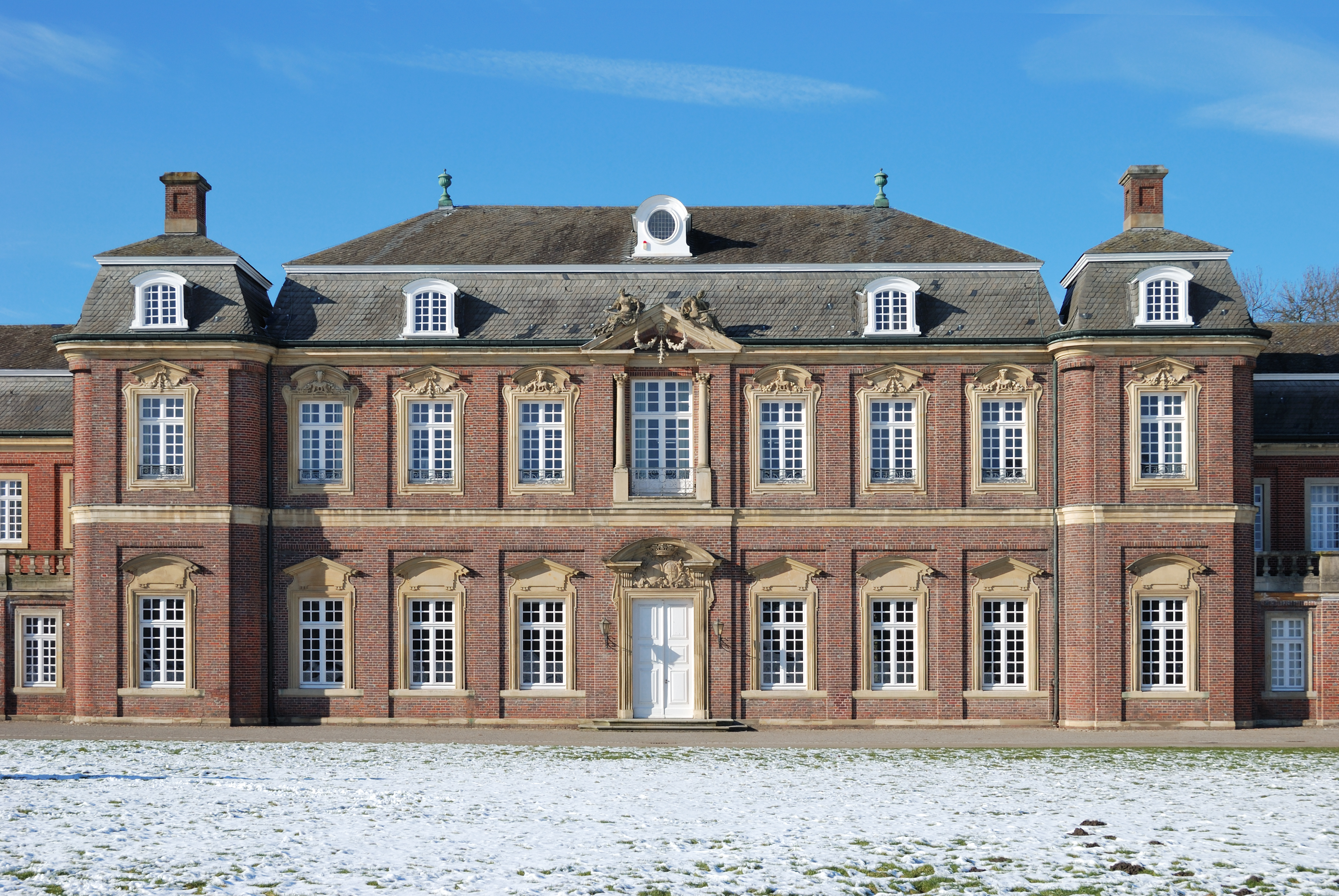

== Construction history ==
The architects of the schloss and its complex of outbuildings were Gottfried Laurenz Pictorius, Peter Pictorius the Younger (from 1706) and Johann Conrad Schlaun, from 1724. The taller corps de logis is flanked by symmetrical lower wings, one of which contains the chapel. The wings are rigorously symmetrical and enclose the cour d'honneur in a U shape. Dutch precedents, such as the palace Het Loo near Apeldoorn, make their presence felt, but the sandstone facing of Schloss Nordkirchen is purely Westphalian.

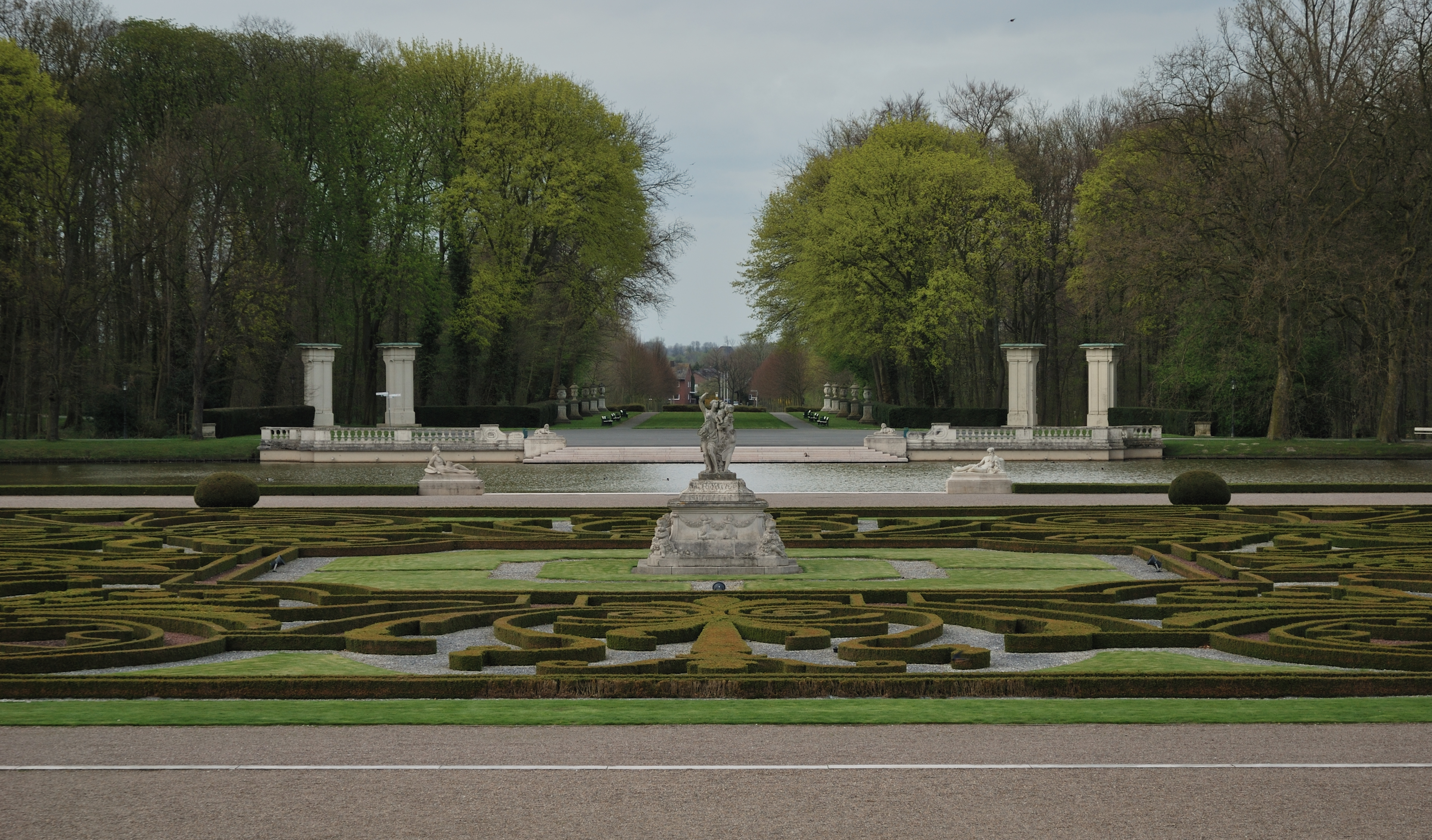
The Venusinsel

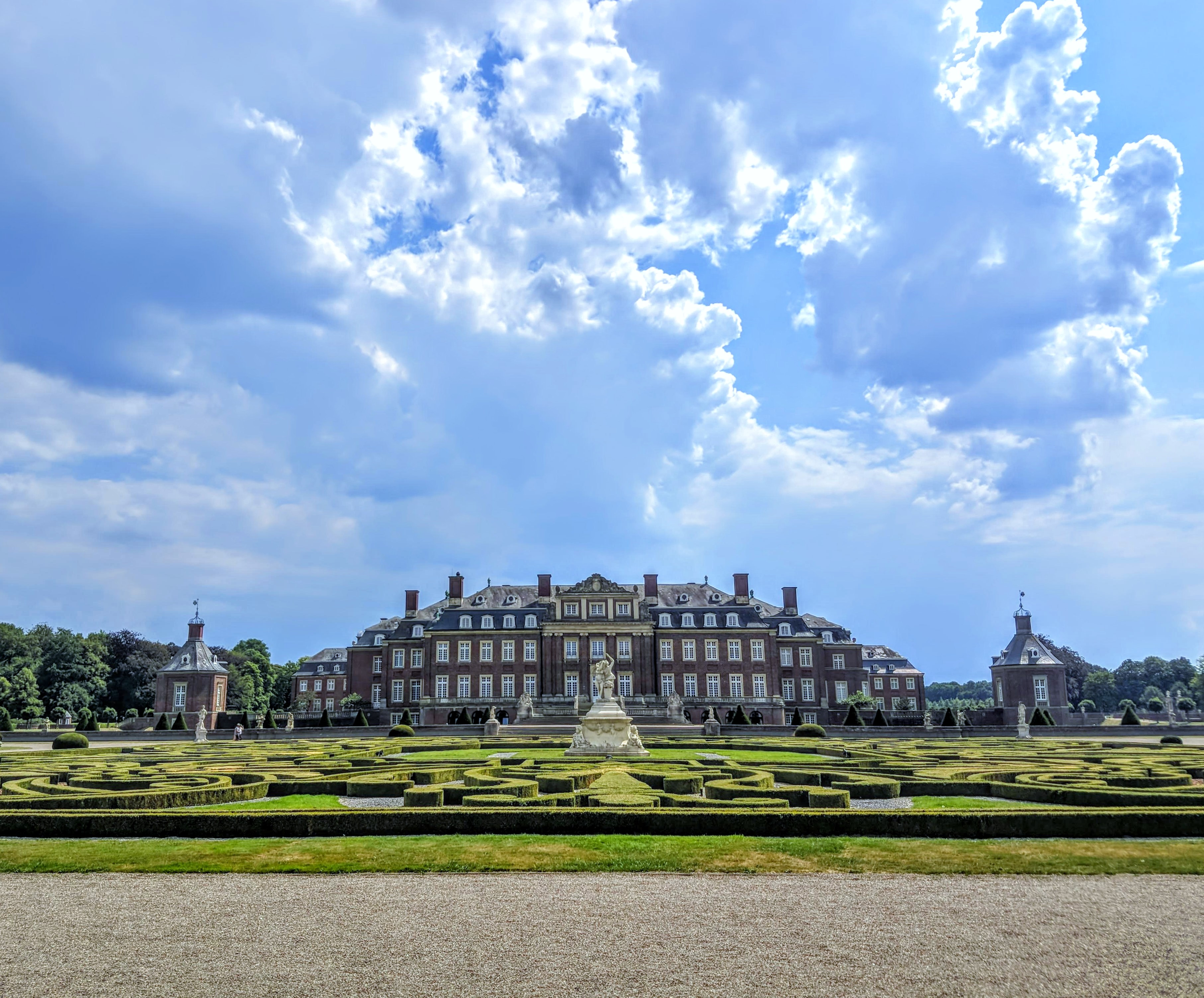
Schloss Nordkirchen and its garden.

== Moat, parterres and park ==
The schloss stands on a rectangular island surrounded by a broad moat-like canal. The island's four corners are accentuated by four small free-standing pavilions.

The garden front gives onto a landscaped park of some 170 hectares, reached through a formal parterre of scrolling broderie on axis, flanked by expanses of lawn. The gardens and the surrounded woods are peopled with a multitude of lifesize marble statues, of which the first deliveries were made in 1721 by the Munich sculptor Johann Wilhelm Gröninger. Other sculptures were delivered by Panhoff and Charles Manskirch. Further sculptures were added during the restoration in neo-Baroque style, undertaken in 1903–07.

== In popular culture ==
Nordkirchen Castle features prominently as a location in the 2021 film Spencer, where it stands in for Sandringham House.

== See also ==
- List of Baroque residences
