= House of Plettenberg =

Westphalian noble family

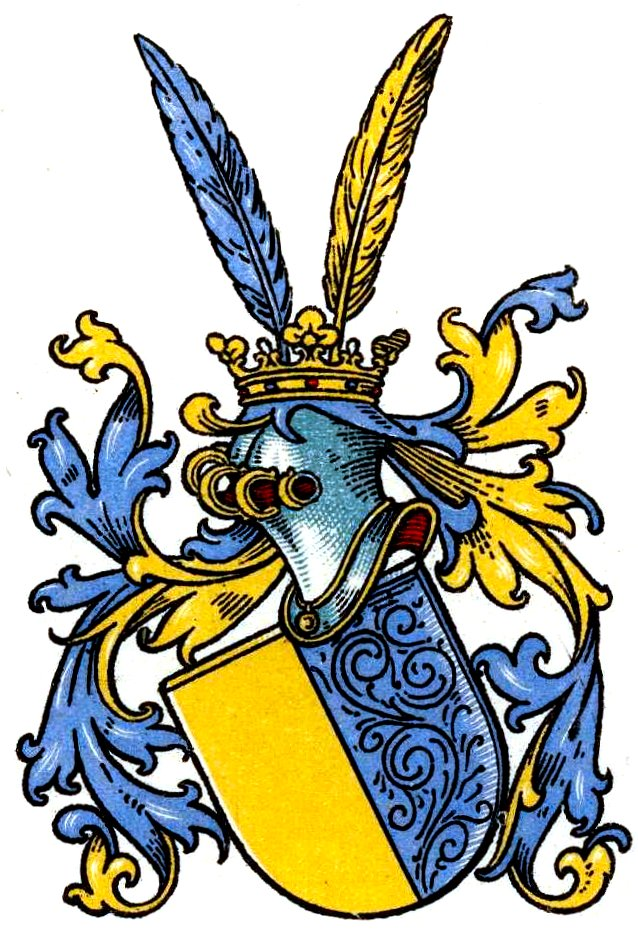
Coat of arms of the noble House of Plettenberg

The House of Plettenberg is the name of the Westphalian noble family of the Uradel. It dates back at least to 1187, when Heidolphus de Plettenbrath was mentioned in a document by Philip I, the archbishop of Cologne. Plettenberg-Wittem branch that ruled immediate Lordships of Meitingen and Sulmingen lost its sovereignty and became mediatised to Württemberg in 1806. This line of the family went extinct in 1813.

== Origins ==
The family's first estate was located at Plettenberg. Hunold I. was Marshal of the Duchy of Westphalia which was ruled by the Archbishop of Cologne. His son Heydenricus de Plettenberg was cited as bailiff of the Counts of Arnsberg in 1258, and became himself marshal of Westphalia in 1266. His son Johann I. was Marshal between 1294 and 1312. Heydenricus' brother Gerhard became Drost (Lord High Steward) of Engelbert III of the Mark. He fortified Schwarzenberg Castle at Plettenberg for the House of La Marck's feuds with the archbishops of Cologne. In 1513 the castle passed into the ownership of the Plettenberg family, which still owns the ruin today.

The two branches of the family still extant today are the Schwarzenberg branch (Grafen von Plettenberg-Heeren, Freiherren von Plettenberg and Freiherren von Bodelschwingh-Plettenberg) who are Lutherans (Evangelical Church in Germany) and the Grafen von Plettenberg-Lenhausen (Roman Catholics).

== Schwarzenberg Branch ==
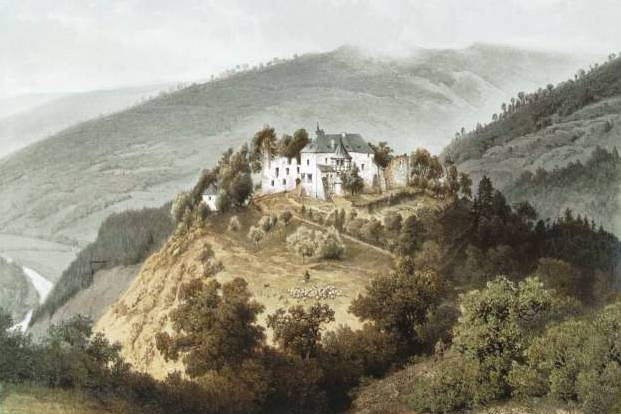
Schwarzenberg Castle

The Schwarzenberg branch was elevated to the rank of Freiherr (Baron) of the Holy Roman Empire in 1689. Since 1433 they lived on their estate Haus Bamenohl. In 1726 they acquired Haus Hilbeck estate near Werl and in 1767 Heeren Castle near Kamen. In 1861 they also inherited Sandfort Castle near Olfen. All of these estates are still today owned and inhabited by the family. In 1913, Wilhelm II, German Emperor, elevated the respective owners of Heeren Castle to the primogenital rank of Graf while all other family members remained Freiherr.

In 1788, Baron Karl Wilhelm Plettenberg married Anna Luisa von Bodelschwingh, heiress of Bodelschwingh Castle at Dortmund, and changed his name to Baron von Bodelschwingh-Plettenberg. His grandson Karl (1821-1907) was made Graf in 1888, and passed his title and estate to his only daughter Wilhelmine who married Baron Dodo Alexander zu Innhausen und Knyphausen (1835-1911). While their son Karl Moritz (1871-1958) and the grandson Edzard (b. 1905) still used the primogenital title Graf von Bodelschwingh-Plettenberg, the present generation is only using the name Baron zu Innhausen und Knyphausen. They still own Bodelschwingh Castle.

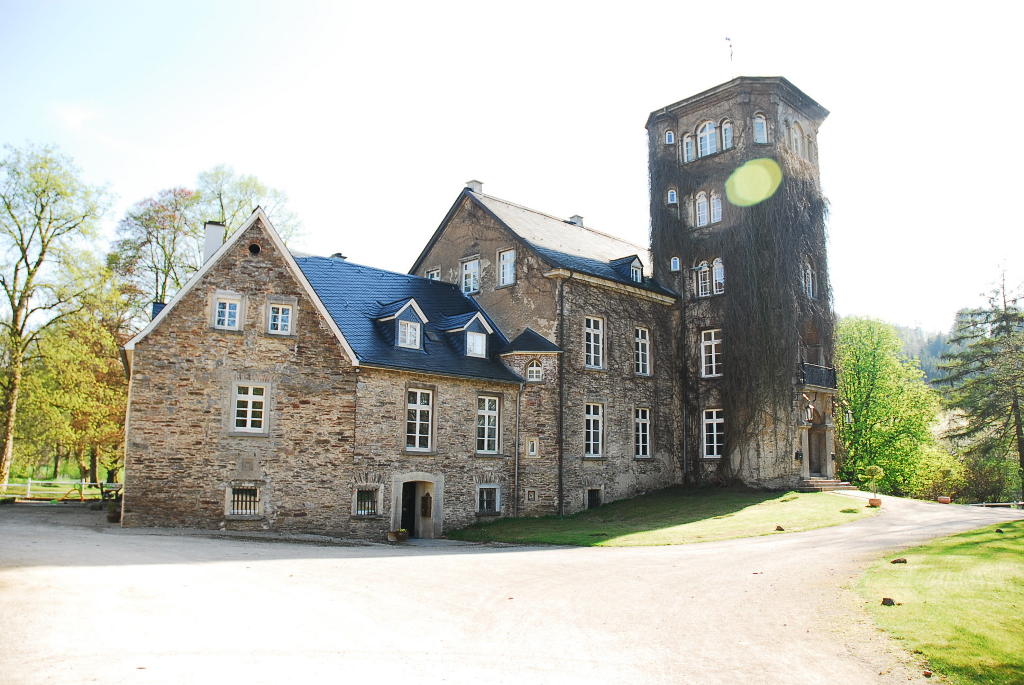
Bamenohl House

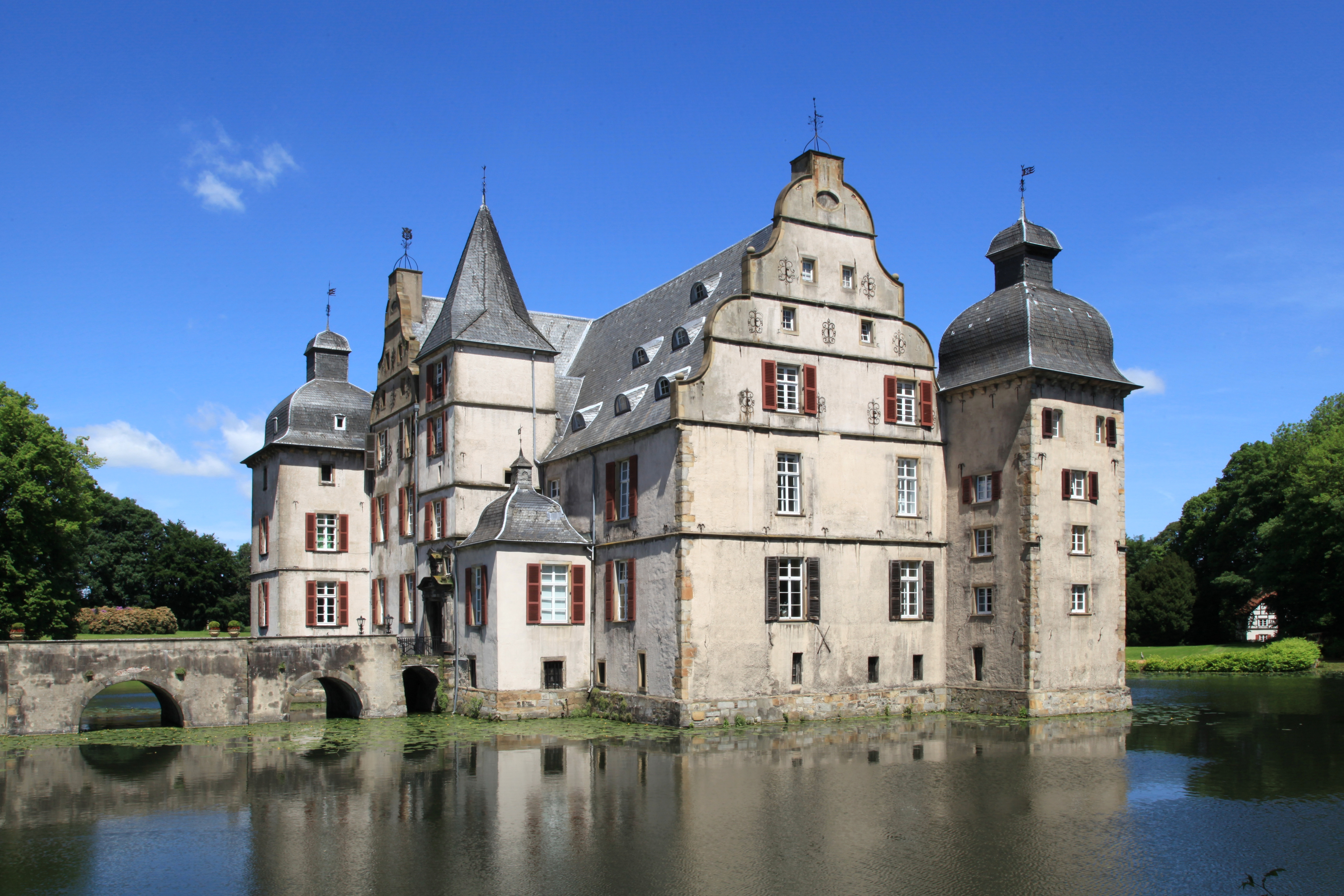
Bodelschwingh House

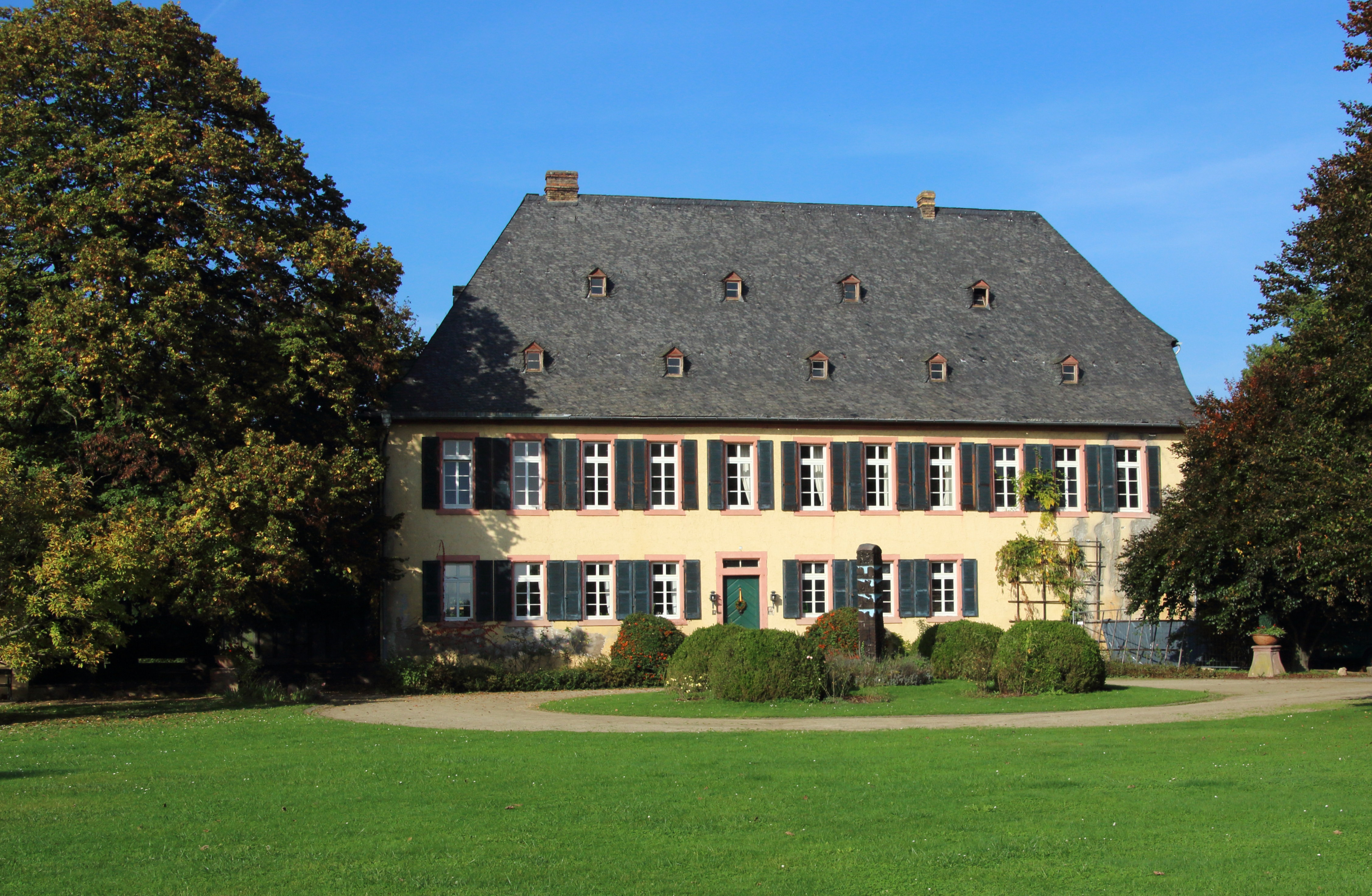
Draiser Hof

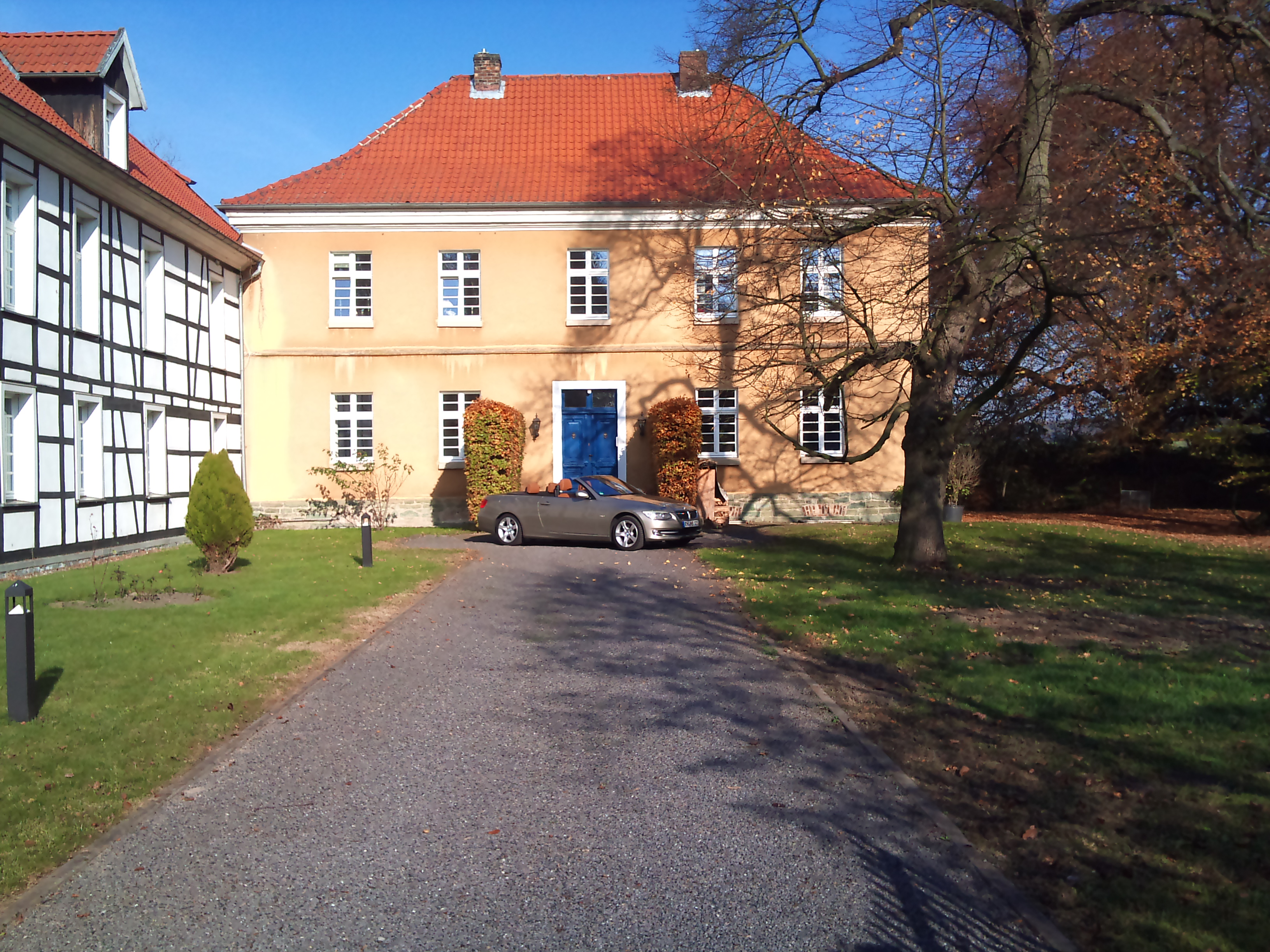
Hilbeck House

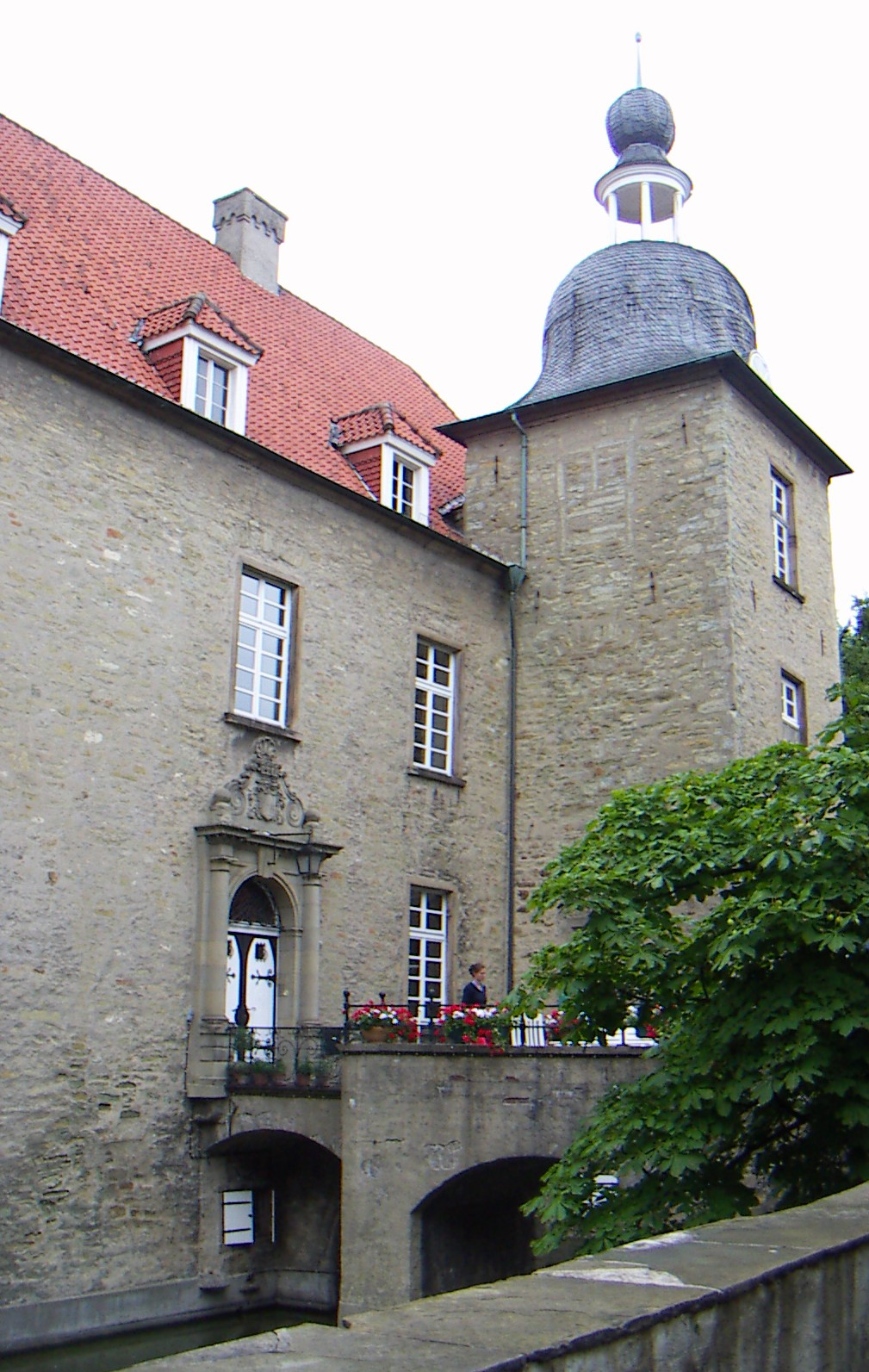
Heeren Castle

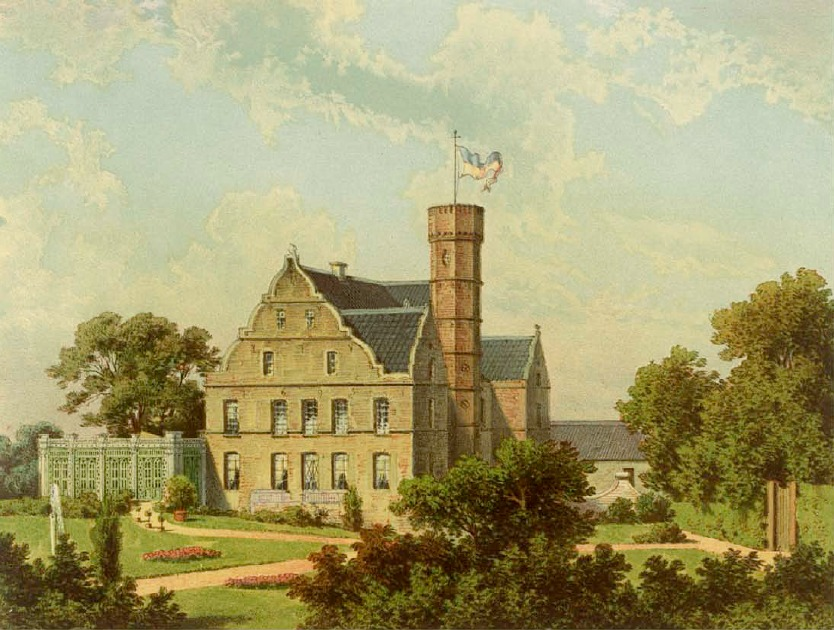
Haus Mehrum

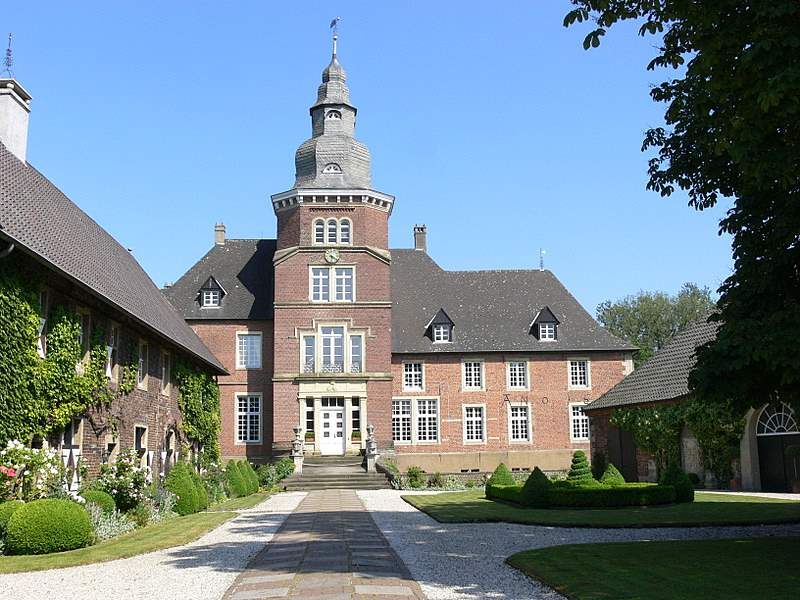
Sandfort Castle

== Lenhausen Branch ==
Heidenreich von Plettenberg (ca 1450–1485), a second son of Haus Bamenohl, acquired the neighboring Lenhausen Castle near Finnentrop in 1457. In 1494 Gut Stockum estate at Sundern was purchased. Friedrich Christian von Plettenberg (1644-1706) became Prince-Bishop of Münster in 1688. One year later, the Lenhausen-Stockum branch was elevated to the rank of Freiherr of the Holy Roman Empire, together with the Schwarzenberg branch, in 1689. In 1710 they acquired Hovestadt Castle at Lippetal. In 1724 the Lenhausen barons were made Imperial counts. Prince-Bishop Friedrich Christian built the monumental Schloss Nordkirchen, and his nephew Ferdinand (1690-1737), prime minister of the Electorate of Cologne, inherited it and completed it by 1734. The Plettenberg family owned Nordkirchen Castle until 1833. The castles at Lenhausen and Hovestadt are still today owned and inhabited by the von Plettenberg family.

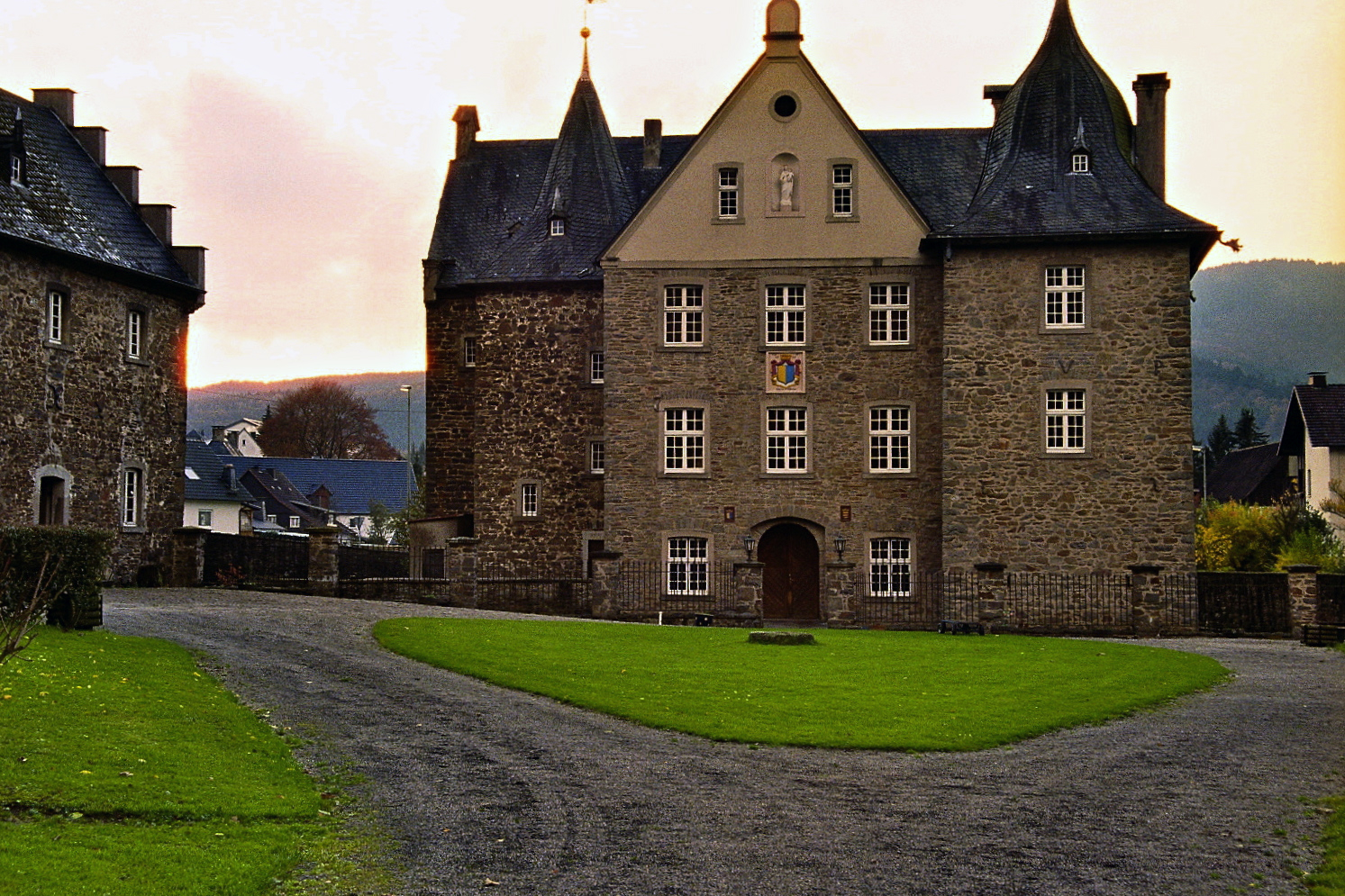
Lenhausen Castle

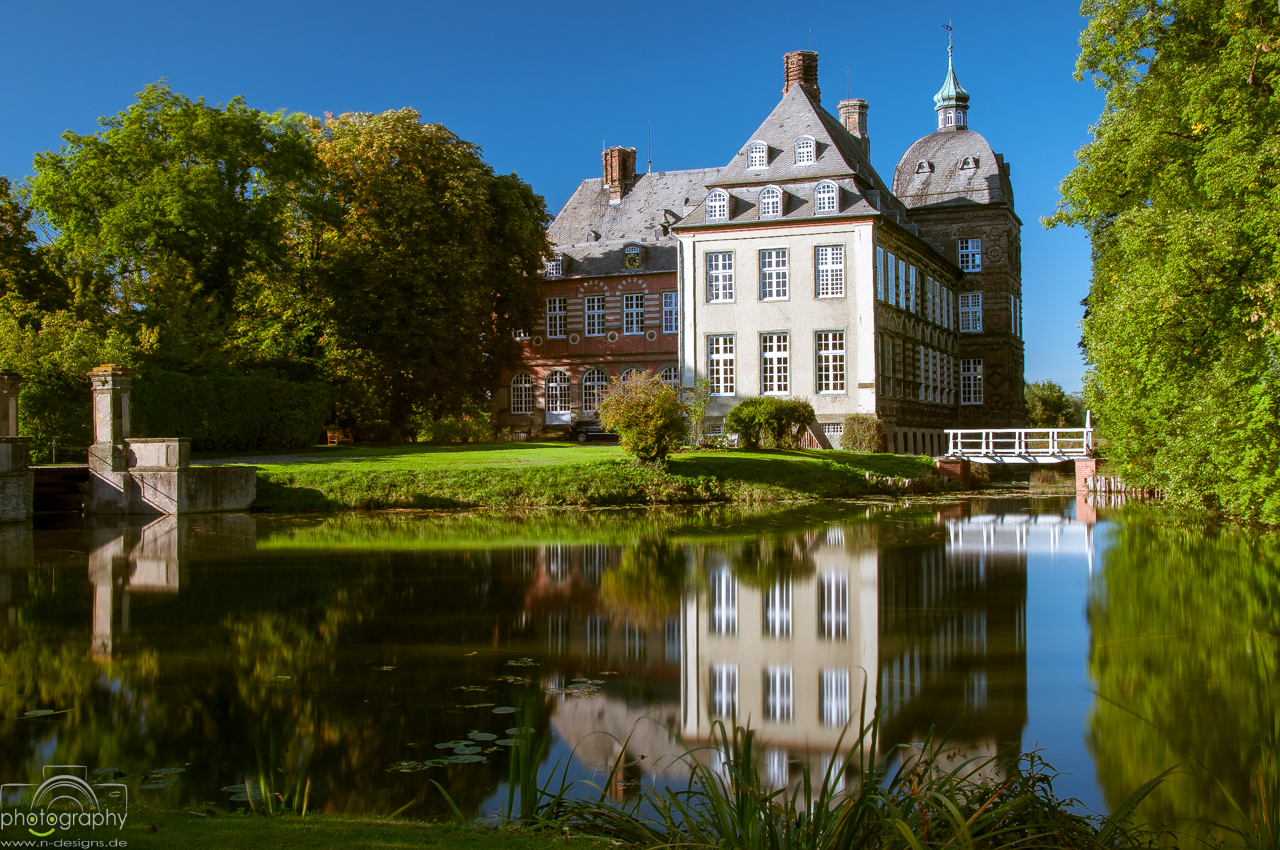
Hovestadt Castle

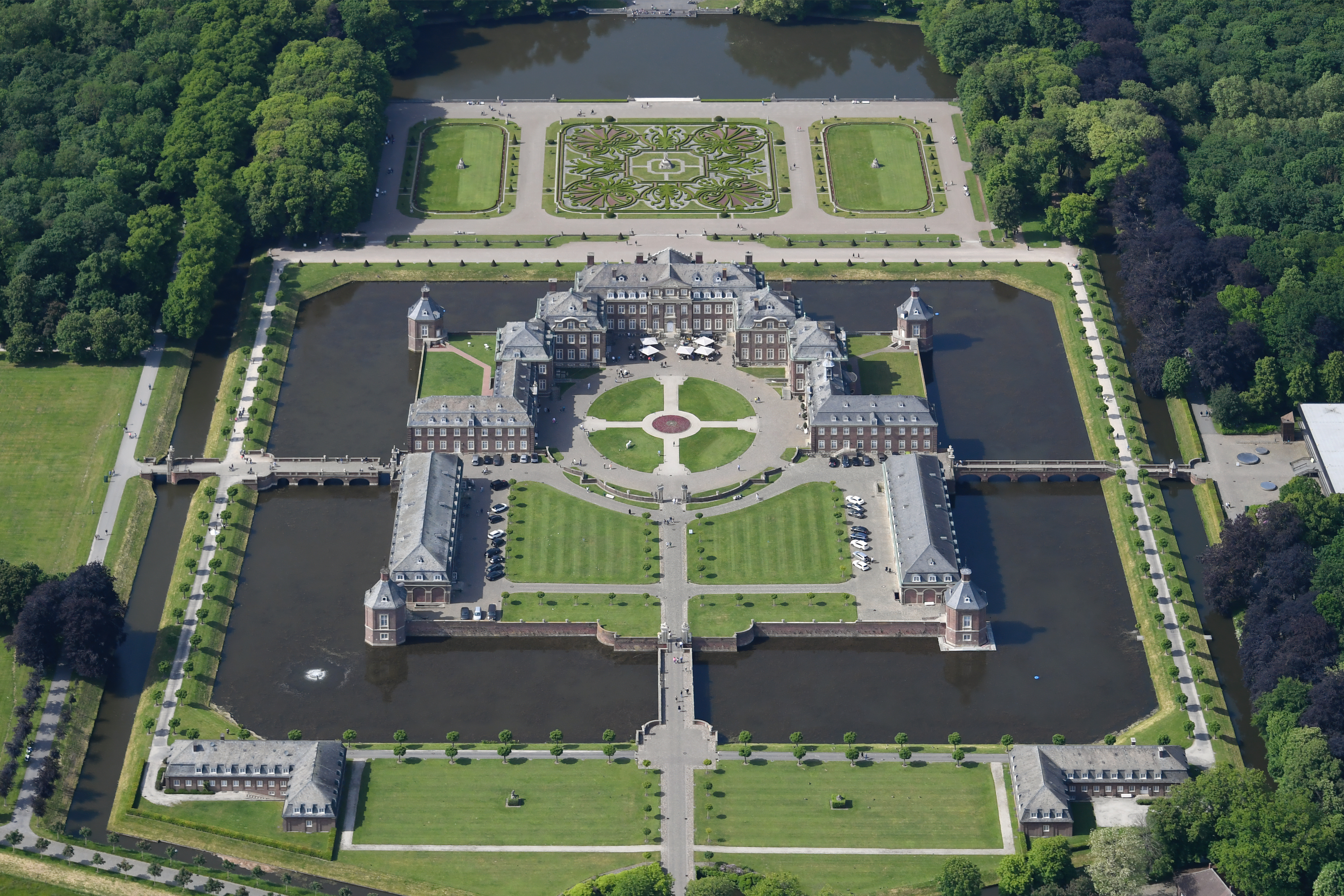
Schloss Nordkirchen

== Notable members ==
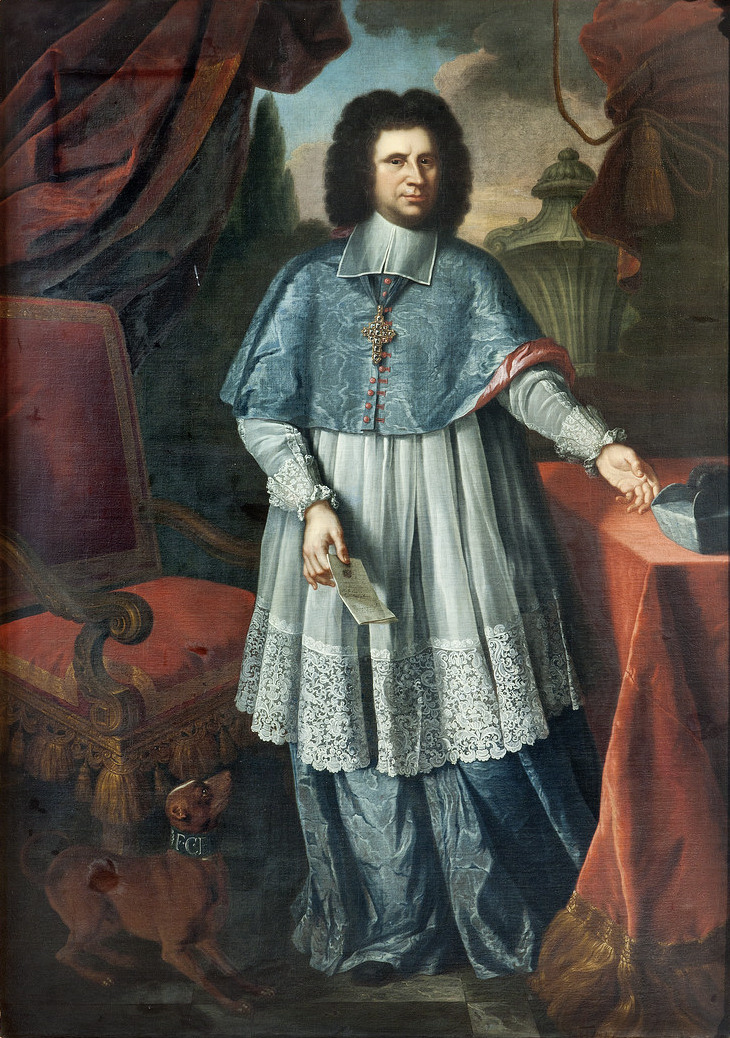
Friedrich Christian von Plettenberg (1644–1706), Prince-Bishop of Münster

- Wolter von Plettenberg (around 1450–1535), Master of the Livonian Order
- Gertrud von Plettenberg (15??–1608), royal mistress of Prince-Elector-Archbishop of Cologne Ernest of Bavaria
- Matthieu van Plattenberg (1607/8–1660), Baroque painter, draughtsman, etcher and engraver
- Friedrich Christian von Plettenberg (1644–1706), prince bishop of Münster
- Ferdinand von Plettenberg (1690–1737), Prime Minister of the Electorate of Cologne
- Joachim van Plettenberg (1739–1793), Governor of the Cape of Good Hope and founder of Plettenberg Bay
- Karl von Plettenberg (1852–1938), General of the Infantry, Commandant-General of the Guards Corps and Adjutant General of the German Kaiser
- Kurt von Plettenberg (1891–1945), plenipotentiary of the House of Hohenzollern (the royal house of Prussia), one of the inner circle of the July 20th plot against Hitler
- Georg von Plettenberg (1918–1980), Colonel of the Bundeswehr
