= Friedrich Christian von Plettenberg =

Prince-Bishop of Münster from 1688 to 1706

Friedrich Christian Freiherr von Plettenberg-Lenhausen
- Prince-Bishop of Münster
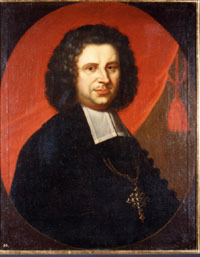
- Church: Catholic Church
- Province: Prince-Bishopric of Münster
- Diocese: Diocese of Münster
- In office: 20 December 1688 – 5 May 1706
- Predecessor: Ferdinand of Fürstenberg
- Successor: Franz Arnold von Wolff-Metternich zur Gracht

Orders
- Ordination: 20 June 1688

Personal details
- Born: 8 August 1644 Lenhausen Castle, Lenhausen (in present-day Finnentrop), Duchy of Westphalia, Electorate of Cologne, Electoral Rhenish Circle, Holy Roman Empire
- Died: 5 May 1706 (aged 61)

Friedrich Christian Freiherr von Plettenberg-Lenhausen (8 August 1644 – 5 May 1706) was Prince-Bishop of Münster from 1688 until his death in 1706. Through his foreign policy, which relied on different alliance partners, he succeeded in giving the Prince-Bishopric of Münster a semi-independent role for the last time during the Nine Years' War.

== Early life ==
Friedrich Christian was born into an old westphalian House of Plettenberg, as the son of Bernhard von Plettenberg zu Lenhausen (1615–1679) and his wife Odilia von Fürstenberg-Schnellenberg-Waterlappe (1617–1683). Ferdinand von Plettenberg, Prime Minister of the Electorate of Cologne was his nephew. He attended high schools in Werl and Siegen and received the first tonsure in 1652. He studied from 1659 at the Collegium Germanicum in Rome. In 1660 he received minor orders. He finished his studies in 1664. He had held a canon position in Speyer since 1663, but gave it up in 1665. Instead, he received a canon position in Münster in 1664, where he was ordained a subdeacon in 1666.

In 1666, he went on a legation trip to the Republic of the Seven United Provinces. He then studied briefly in Orléans. In 1670 he received a canon position in Paderborn. In 1677 he became provost of St. Martini in Münster and archdeacon of Ennigerloh. He also received the Archidiaconate uffm Dreen. Plettenberg went on various legation trips in 1679 and 1680 and was appointed Geheimrat in 1680. In 1683 he was also president of the court chamber. In 1686 he was elected cathedral dean. From 1687, Plettenberg was vicar general of the diocese of Münster. He was ordained a priest in 1688.

== Prince bishop ==
On 29 July 1688 he was elected prince bishop. He brought significant diplomatic experience into his office. Likewise, he knew his way through the offices held in the past in the government of the congregation. As a bishop, Friedrich Christian tried to improve the education of priests. He loved and organized many magnificent liturgies and church festivities. For the cathedral, he donated, among other things, new windows, silver candelabra and a marble floor.

To strengthen the independence of the bishop, he built, among other things with foreign aid, the Münster military. He had the neglected land fortresses repaired. In Munster, an armory was built and the fortifications of Meppen improved. Since the foreign funds were not sufficient, he took without the approval of the estates, loans of 100,000 Reichstalern to bring the army to a strength of 6,000 men. The loan was repaid through additional subsidies. Shortly after the death of the bishop in 1706, the army consisted of a bodyguard of 126 infantrymen and 70 cavalrymen. The main force consisted of seven infantry regiments with a combined total of about 3,000 men, two cavalry regiments with 660 men and an artillery division. The maintenance of the army, fortresses and magazines amounted to 200,000 Reichstaler per year. Most soldiers were mercenaries, often older and unreliable.

Under pressure from emperor Leopold I, he participated in the war against France. However, the troops from Münster and Brandenburg arrived too late in the theatre, which contributed to the defeat of the allies in the Battle of Fleurus. On the orders of his sovereigns, the Münster General Schwartz had stopped at Jülich.

Friedrich Christian remained closely connected to his family. He bought the then still small Nordkirchen Castle for them, turning it into a palace called "the Versailles of Westphalia". Plettenberg died before it was completed by Johann Conrad Schlaun. His epitaph was created by Johann Mauritz Gröninger and is located in St. Paul's Cathedral in Münster.
