= Gertrud von Plettenberg =

German noblewoman (died 1608)

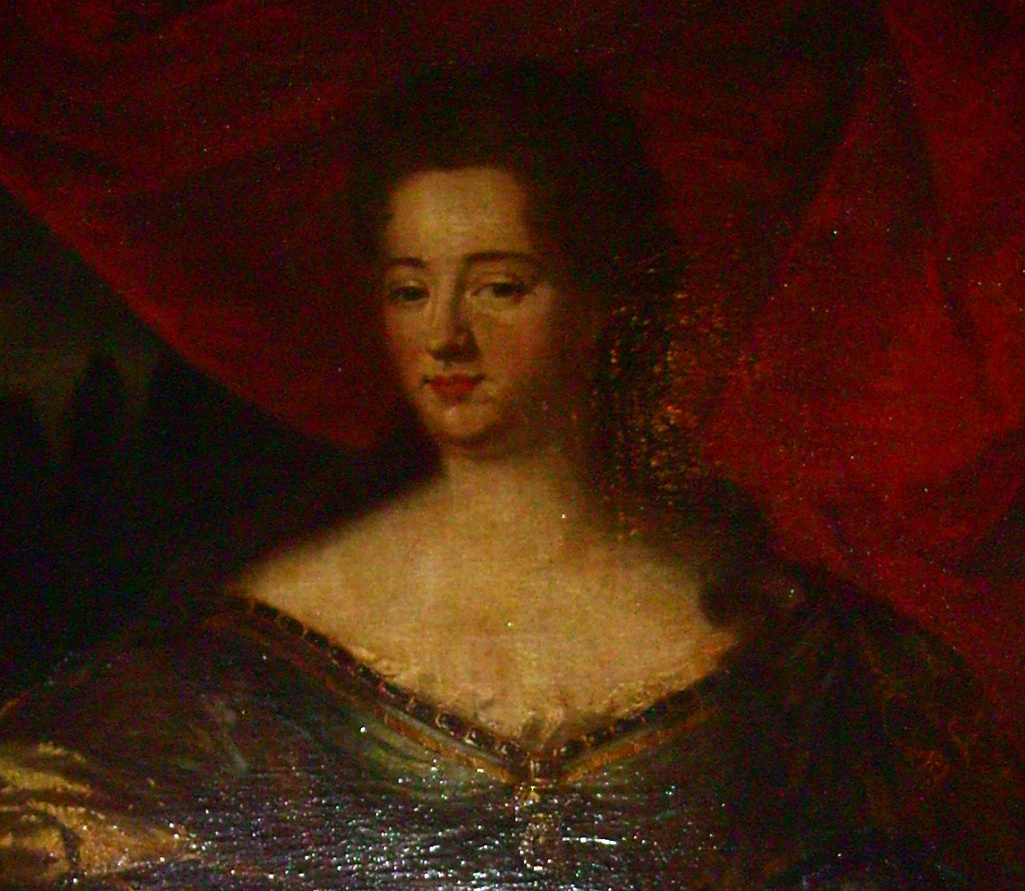
Gertrud von Plettenberg

Gertrud von Plettenberg-Seckenrode (died 26 October 1608) was a German noblewoman, administrator of several castles of the Electorate of Cologne and royal mistress of Prince Ernest of Bavaria, Archbishop of Cologne.

== Biography ==
Gertrud von Plettenberg was a member of the Seckenrode branch of the House of Plettenberg. She was born as a daughter of Ulrich II von Plettenberg-Seckenrode (1530-1584) and his wife, Catharina Margaretha von Luggenhausen (b. 1535). As her family was poor, but noble and well connected, she was given a position at the court of Ernest of Bavaria in Arnsberg, Hirschberg and Höllinghofen. Because of her, Ernest primarily resided at Arnsberg from 1595 onward. Gertrud and Ernest were lovers from 1595, and reportedly married secretly and morganatically in 1605. They had one son, legitimized in 1600, Wilhelm von Bayern, Baron von Höllinghofen, Abbot of Stablo and Malmedy (d. 1657) and one daughter. From 1598, she is mentioned by contemporaries as his hostess. There were rumors at her death that she had been poisoned by the Duchess of Cleves.
