= Kurt von Plettenberg =

German forester, cavalry officer and resistance member

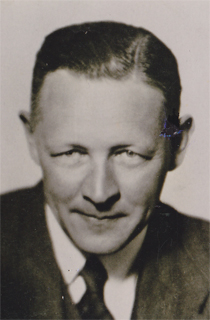
Kurt von Plettenberg (1930)

Kurt Freiherr von Plettenberg (31 January 1891 – 10 March 1945) was a German forester, cavalry officer and a member of the German Resistance (Widerstand). He was involved in the preparations for the 20 July plot, an attempt to assassinate Adolf Hitler, Führer of the Third Reich. Plettenberg belonged to the circle of close friends which included Claus Schenk Graf von Stauffenberg, Johannes Popitz, Ludwig Beck, Ulrich von Hassell, Carl-Hans Graf von Hardenberg and Fabian von Schlabrendorff.

== Family ==
Kurt was born as a member of an old aristocratic House of Plettenberg from Westphalia in Germany. He was the son of Baron Karl von Plettenberg (1852–1938) and his wife, Countess Clara von Wedel-Jarlsberg (1865-1938). He was married to Baroness Arianne von Maltzahn (b. 1914), with whom he had two daughters and a son.

== Life ==
Born in Buckeburg, Kurt Freiherr von Plettenberg studied law and forestry at Kiel University, the University of Lausanne, the Faculty of Forest Sciences and Forest Ecology of the University of Göttingen in Hannoversch Münden, the Friedrich Wilhelm University of Berlin, the Ludwig-Maximilians-Universität München, and the Eberswalde University for Sustainable Development. His studies were temporarily interrupted by the First World War. He became regional forest director in the Reich Forest Office. In 1937, he resigned from the forest service at his own request because the political prescriptions of the National Socialist regime conflicted with his opinions.

In the post of court chamberlain, he administered the property of the former royal house of Schaumburg-Lippe. Drafted in 1939, he distinguished himself in service as a battalion leader and commander of a subsidiary regiment of Infantry Regiment 9 Potsdam. At the end of 1941, he became plenipotentiary of the former Prussian royal family. Kurt von Plettenberg was arrested at the beginning of March 1945. To avoid betraying his friends under torture, he threw himself out of a third-floor window of the Gestapo's "house prison" at 8 Prinz-Albrecht-Straße in Berlin.

== Bibliography ==
- Eberhard Schmidt (2014), Kurt von Plettenberg – Im Kreis der Verschwörer um Stauffenberg – Ein Lebensweg (in German), München: F.A. Herbig, ISBN 978-3-7766-8196-3
- Axel Freiherr von dem Bussche-Streithorst: Zur Erinnerung an Kurt Plettenberg. Münster 1985
- Irmgard von der Lühe: Lebenswege im Widerstand. Lit, Münster/Hamburg 1993, ISBN 3-89473-662-3.
- Hubert Hugo Hilf: Dem Gedächtnis an Kurt Freiherr von Plettenberg (1891–1945). In: Forstarchiv. 30. Jahrgang, Heft 7/1959, S. 133–134
- August Winnig: Aus zwanzig Jahren. Dem Gedächtnis der Freunde Max Habermann, Ulrich von Oertzen, Kurt Freiherr von Plettenberg, Fritz-Dietlof Graf von der Schulenburg. Wittig, Hamburg 1948
- Andreas Gautschi: Der Reichsjägermeister. Fakten und Legenden um Hermann Göring (3. Auflage). Nimrod, Hanstedt 2000, ISBN 3-927848-20-4 (enthält auch biografische Details über von Plettenberg, hier besonders S. 65)
- Heinrich Rubner: Deutsche Forstgeschichte 1933–1945. Forstwirtschaft, Jagd und Umwelt im NS-Staat. 2., erweiterte Auflage. Scripta-Mercaturae-Verlag, St. Katharinen 1997, ISBN 3-89590-032-X (hier besonders S. 293)
- Hans-Jürgen Wegener: Freiherr von Plettenberg – Ein Vorbild. In: Forst und Holz. 49. Jahrgang, Heft 13/1994, S. 363, ISSN 0932-9315
- Erwin Garvens: Mitgliederverzeichnis der Société d’Étudiants Germania Lausanne, Hamburg 1937
