= Karl von Plettenberg =

Prussian officer and General of Infantry

Karl Freiherr von Plettenberg
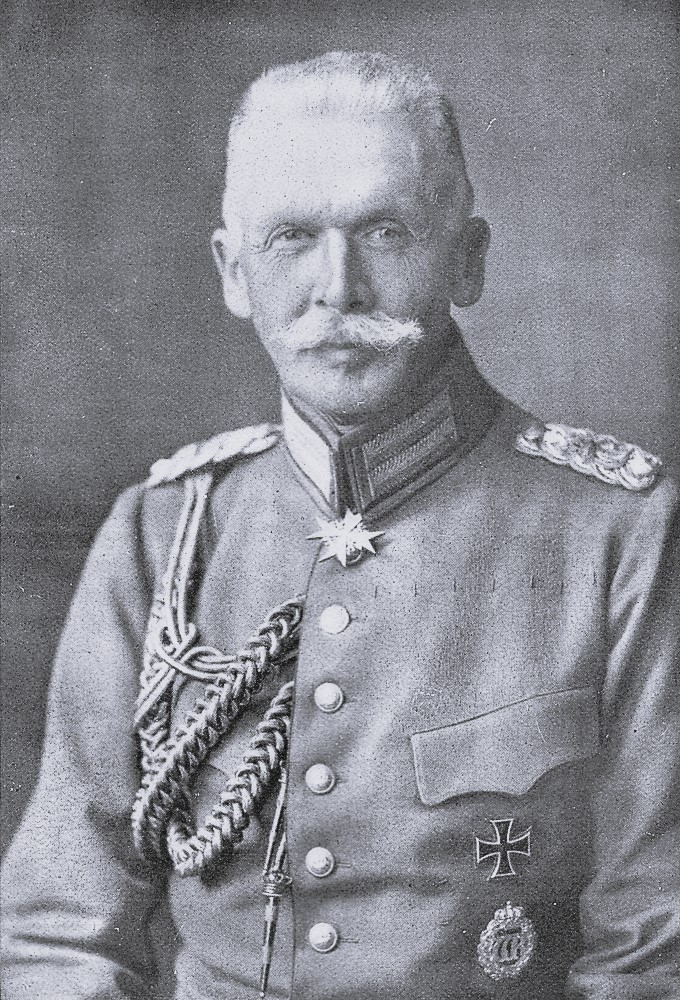
- Born: 18 December 1852; Neuhaus, Kingdom of Prussia
- Died: 10 February 1938 (aged 85); Bückeburg, Germany
- Relatives: Kurt von Plettenberg
- Military career
- Allegiance: German Empire (to 1918)
- Branch: Army
- Service years: 1870–1917
- Rank: General of Infantry
- Commands: 7th (Westphalian) Jäger Battalion; Guards Jäger Battalion; 1st Foot Guards Regiment; 22nd Infantry Division; IX Corps; Guards Corps
- Conflicts: Franco-Prussian War; World War I
- Awards: Pour le Mérite

Karl Freiherr von Plettenberg (18 December 1852, in Neuhaus – 10 February 1938, in Bückeburg) was a Prussian officer, and later General of Infantry during World War I. He was Commandant-General of the Guards Corps, Adjutant General of the German Kaiser Wilhelm II and a recipient of Pour le Mérite.

== Life and military career ==
Karl von Plettenberg was born on 18 December 1852 in Neuhaus into the Westphalian old noble Plettenberg family from the Sauerland. He was the son of Baron Eugen von Plettenberg, an officer (Major and cavalry squadron commander) and his wife, Minette von der Borch (1827–1885).

== World War I ==
Karl von Plettenberg was in command of the Guards Corps at the outset of World War I, assigned to the 2nd Army as part of the right wing of the forces that invaded France and Belgium as part of the Schlieffen Plan offensive in August 1914. He led the Guards Corps at the First Battle of the Marne and the First Battle of Ypres.

He was decorated with the Pour le Mérite on 14 May 1915, and on 27 January 1916 awarded à la suite of the 1st Foot Guards Regiment. After criticism of the war by Erich Ludendorff and Paul von Hindenburg during the "battles of material" on the Western Front, Plettenberg was forced into retirement on 24 January 1917.

== Later life ==
After his retirement, he returned to Bückeburg where he died on 10 February 1938. Plettenbergstraße, a street in the town, is named after him.

== Family ==
His oldest son, Karl-Wilhelm, was a lieutenant in the 1st Foot Guards Regiment of the Guards Corps at the outbreak of the war. He died on 30 August 1914 during the Battle of St Quentin.

His second son, Kurt von Plettenberg (1891–1945), was plenipotentiary of the House of Hohenzollern (the royal house of Prussia) and one of the inner circle of the July 20th plot against Hitler. He committed suicide on 10 March 1945 by jumping from a window during interrogation by the Gestapo.

== Awards ==
- Order of the Crown 1st Class
- Knight's Cross of the Royal House Order of Hohenzollern
- Iron Cross of 1870, 2nd class
- Cross of the Prussian Service Award
- Honor Commander's Cross of the Princely House Order of Hohenzollern
- Grand Cross with Gold Crown in the Order of the Wendish Crown
- Commander of the Order of the Griffon (Mecklenburg)
- Honorary Grand Cross of the House and Merit Order of Peter Frederick Louis (Oldenburg)
- Cross of Honour 1st Class with Crown (Reuss)
- Commander, First Class of the Albert Order
- Commander of the Order of the White Falcon
- Commander, First Class of the Ducal Saxe-Ernestine House Order
- Cross of Honor, First Class of the House Order of Lippe
- Military Merit Cross, 2nd Class (Waldeck)
- Merit Cross, 1st Class (Waldeck)
- Grand Cross of the Order of the Dannebrog (Denmark)
- Grand Cross of the Royal Victorian Order (United Kingdom)
- Grand Officer of the Order of the Crown of Italy
- Grand Cross of the Order of Orange-Nassau (Netherlands)
- Order of the Iron Crown, 2nd Class (Austria)
- Knight of the Order of Franz Joseph
- Grand Officer of the Order of the Lion and the Sun (Persia)
- Commander of the Order of the Star of Romania
- Officer of the Order of the Crown of Romania
- Imperial and Royal Order of the White Eagle (Russia)
- Order of St. Anna, 2nd Class with Diamonds (Russia)
- Officer of the Order of the White Eagle (Serbia)
- Grand Cross of the Order of the White Elephant (Thailand)
- Pour le Mérite (Prussia, 14 May 1915)
- Order of the Black Eagle (Prussia, 24 January 1917)
- Grand Cross of the Order of the Red Eagle, with Swords and Crown (Prussia, 24 January 1917)

Military offices
Preceded by General der Kavallerie Hermann Freiherr von Vietinghoff genannt Scheel	Commander, IX Corps; 12 April 1910 - 1 March 1913	Succeeded by General der Infanterie Ferdinand von Quast
Preceded by General der Infanterie Alfred von Loewenfeld	Commander, Guards Corps; 1 March 1913 - 6 February 1917	Succeeded by General der Infanterie Ferdinand von Quast
