= Fritz-Dietlof von der Schulenburg =

German government official (1902–1944)

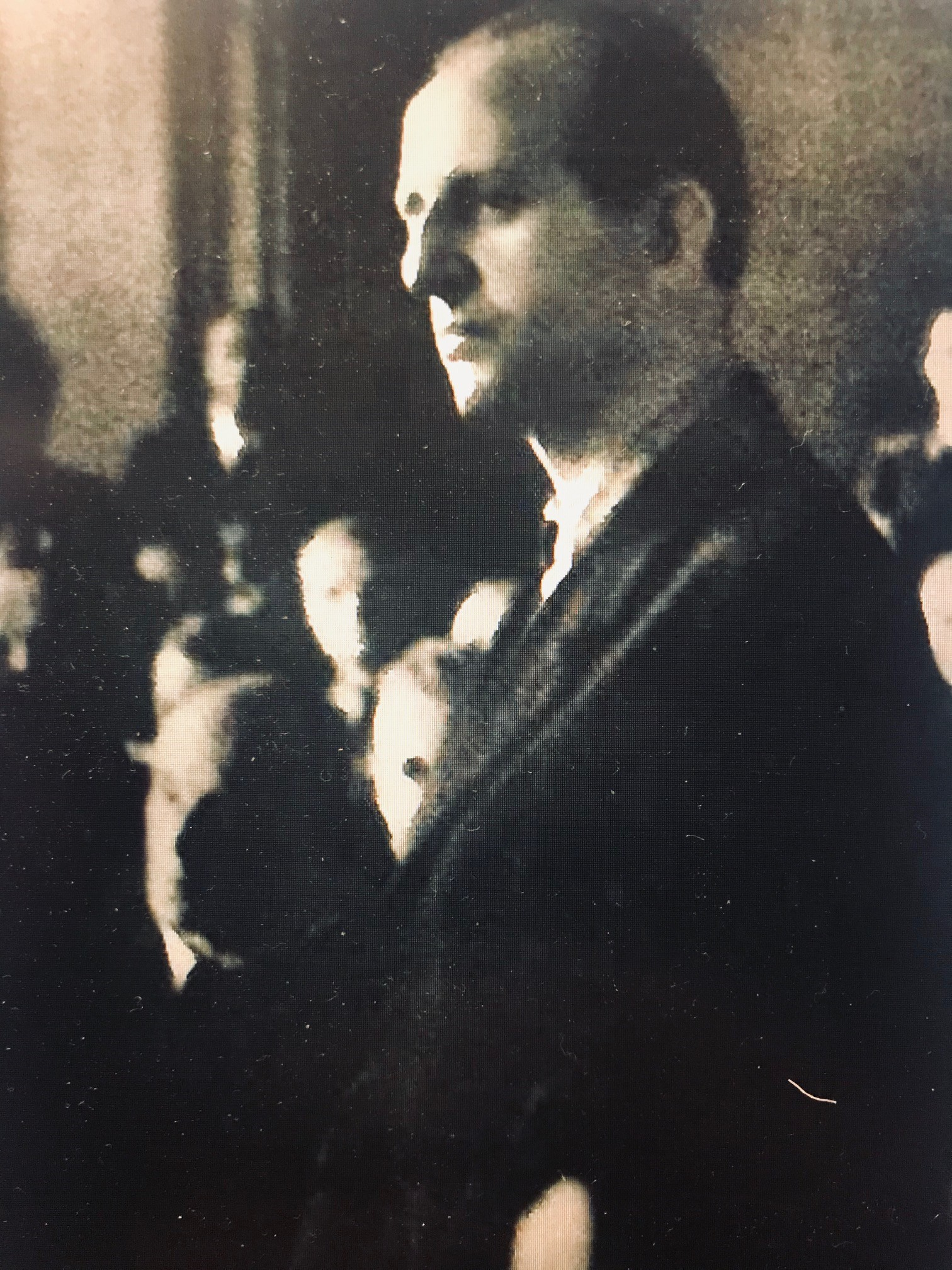
- Fritz-Dietlof von der Schulenburg in 1944

Oberpräsident of the Province of Silesia
- Acting
- In office 1938–1940

Personal details
- Born: 5 September 1902 London, England, United Kingdom
- Died: 10 August 1944 (aged 41) Plötzensee Prison, Berlin, Nazi Germany
- Cause of death: Execution by hanging
- Party: Nazi Party
- Spouse: Charlotte Kotelmann (m. 1933)
- Parent(s): Friedrich Graf von der Schulenburg (father); Freda-Marie von Arnim (mother)
- Education: University of Göttingen; University of Marburg
- Profession: Assessor
- Known for: Member of the 20 July Plot
- Nickname: Roter Graf

Military service
- Allegiance: Nazi Germany; German resistance
- Branch/service: German Army
- Rank: Lieutenant of the reserve
- Unit: Infantry Regiment 9 Potsdam
- Battles/wars: World War II: Operation Barbarossa

Fritz-Dietlof Graf von der Schulenburg (5 September 1902 – 10 August 1944) was a German government official and a member of the German Resistance in the 20 July Plot against Adolf Hitler.

== Personal development ==
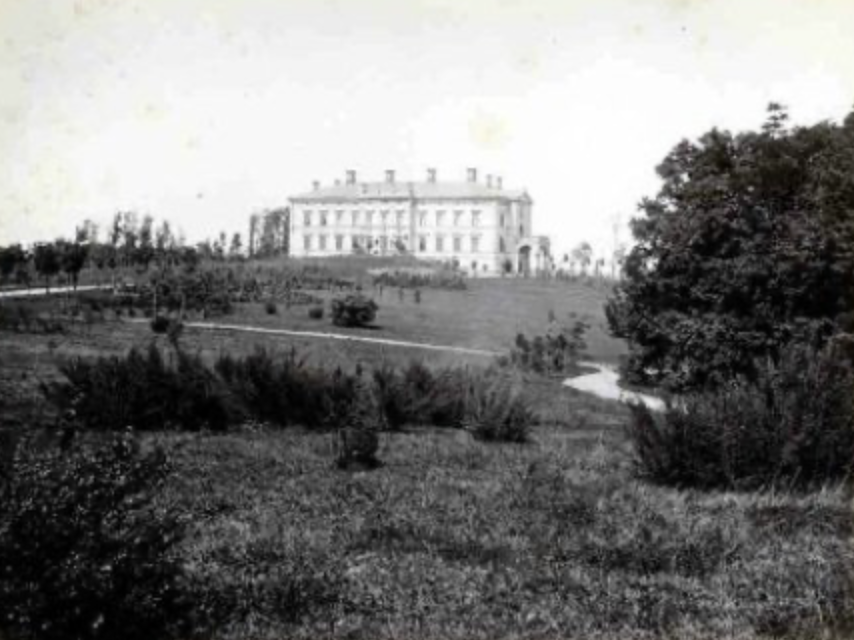
Schulenburg estate in Mecklenburg

Schulenburg was born in London, as his father, Friedrich Graf von der Schulenburg, was at the time the German Empire's military attaché to the Court of St James's in the British capital. His mother was Freda-Marie von Arnim (born 1873). As a result of the nature of their father's work, Schulenburg, his four brothers, and their sister Tisa von der Schulenburg, grew up in several different places, including Berlin, Potsdam, Münster, and the family's country house, Schloss Tressow in northwestern Mecklenburg. By the traditions of the Prussian nobility, the children were at first strictly educated at home by a governess.

In 1920, Schulenburg passed his Abitur exam in Lübeck. He then decided not to pursue a career as a military officer, the family tradition, but instead studied law at the universities of Göttingen and Marburg. During that time, he became a member of the Corps Saxonia Göttingen, a German student fraternity, and he sustained several cuts as a result of the traditional dueling with swords. In 1923, he took the state examination in Celle, and for the next five years was employed as a trainee civil servant in Potsdam and Kyritz. In 1924, he interrupted his training for three months and served as a sailor on a steamship to South America and back. He completed his training in 1928, and became a graduate civil servant (Assessor) in Recklinghausen.

As a member of a prominent old Prussian noble family, Schulenburg was part of the German Empire's ruling class, which was defined by the two pillars of the state, the military and the civil service. Because of this background, Schulenburg immersed himself in practical subjects such as agrarian debt and land reform. His romantic vision of the farming community and of social justice soon earned him the nickname the "roter Graf" ("Red Count") from his colleagues.

== Joining the Nazi Party ==
Schulenburg's first contacts with the Nazi Party came in 1930, and he had become a party member by 1932, at about the same time as the rest of the family joined. In the same year, he was posted to East Prussia, where he helped to build the Nazi rank and file. Schulenburg could be counted among the followers of "north German" Nazism, characterized mainly by the brothers Gregor and Otto Strasser. Gregor Strasser was murdered during the Night of the Long Knives on Hitler's orders. Otto Strasser escaped into exile in following the 1930 Bamberg Conference where he opposed Hitler. He returned to Germany in 1956.

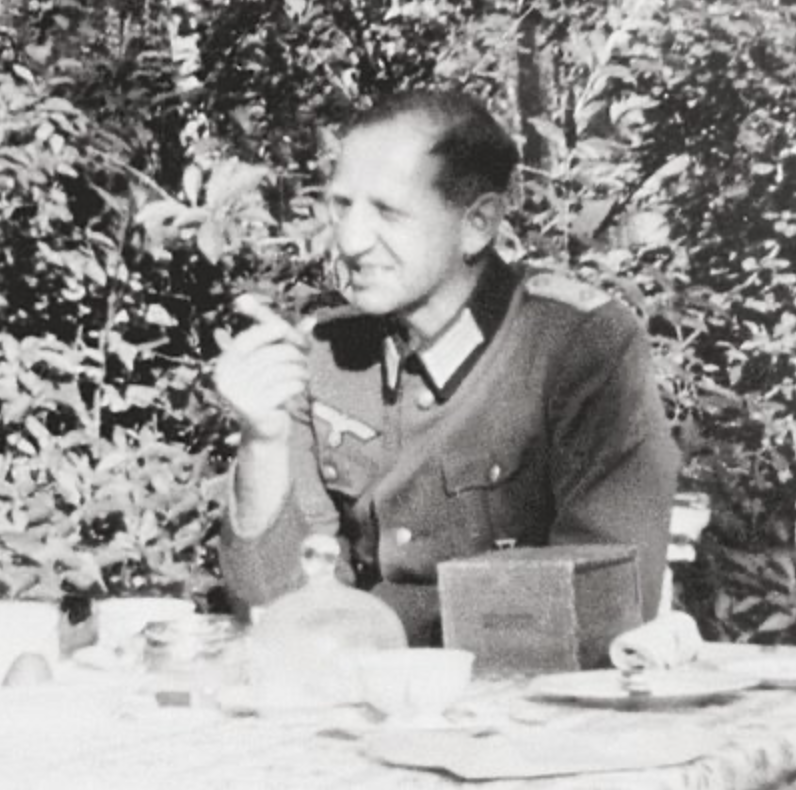
Fritz-Dietlof Graf v.d.Schulenburg

In March 1933, Schulenburg was appointed to the government council in Königsberg and gained increasing influence, both as a government official and as a member of the Party. He married Charlotte Kotelmann in the same month. His new jobs at this time were mainly to establish Gleichschaltung (the Nazi policy of forced "coordination" of societal groups) among officials in the realm of his influence, and also to delegate jobs to Nazi Party members.

However, Schulenburg increasingly came into conflict with his superior, Erich Koch, the infamous Gauleiter of East Prussia. In 1934, he had himself transferred to the small town of Fischhausen, west of Königsberg, as a district administrator. The conflicts with Koch increased as time went on, but in 1937 he was promoted by the German Interior Ministry and posted to Berlin as vice president of police. His immediate superior was the Berlin President of Police Wolf Heinrich von Helldorf, who resisted having Schulenburg assigned for a long time. Contrary to expectations, however, the two very different officials got along well together.

By his own account Schulenburg made his break with the regime as a result of the Blomberg-Fritsch Affair in 1938. Hitler abolished the title of Minister of War, taking on the leadership of the army himself. In the same year Schulenburg took part in planning a putsch in case Hitler decided to go to war, which was averted for the time being by the Munich Agreement.

In 1939, the year Hitler attacked Poland, Schulenburg was appointed as acting Oberpräsident of Upper and Lower Silesia. By this time, the Nazi régime had come to view him as politically untrustworthy, and in 1940 he was excluded from the Nazi Party.

== Wartime experiences ==
In May 1940, Schulenburg joined his reserve Infantry Regiment 9 Potsdam, out of patriotism but also because of his belief that he would be more useful to the resistance from a military position. As a lieutenant of the reserves with their elite unit he participated in the Russian Campaign and was awarded the Iron Cross (1st Class). He was appalled by the military leadership on the Eastern Front and by the treatment of the civilian population. During this period his job changed frequently and in the end he returned to the reserve battalion in Potsdam. Long before Claus von Stauffenberg took centre stage in the plot to overthrow Hitler, Schulenburg was the inner driving force of the conspiracy.

== Resistance movement ==
On the Eastern Front, the crises that became apparent involving the provisioning, military leadership, and treatment of civilian populations in conquered lands gave Schulenburg reason to distrust the Nazis. His attitude towards Nazism changed radically at this time. Schulenburg observed with growing anxiety and disgust the lawlessness of the Nazi régime, and he made contacts with like-minded opposition forces from a spectrum of political circles, including other Prussian aristocrats like himself. One of the greatest friends to the circle at that time was Count Peter Yorck von Wartenburg, another scion of a historically famous Prussian noble family. By 1942, he was regularly taking part in the small Kreisau Circle's meetings.

A remarkably forward-looking resistance-group plan for postwar Europe, co-authored by Schulenburg in 1943, says:

"The special thing about the European problem consists of there being, in a comparatively small area, a multiplicity of peoples who are to live together in a combination of unity and independence. Their unity must be so tight that war will never again be waged between them in future, and Europe's outside interests can be protected jointly... The solution of the European states can only be effected on a federative basis, with the European states incorporating themselves into a community of sovereign states by their own free decision."

As a nobleman, government official, and army officer, Schulenburg had multiple contacts, which he used over time to recruit plotters. Due to these ties, especially with the civilian resistance circles surrounding Carl Friedrich Goerdeler and the socialist group (Reichsbanner Schwarz-Rot-Gold) about Julius Leber, he stood out as an important link.

By 1943, Schulenburg had fallen under suspicion of working against the régime and spent one night under arrest. However, owing to his aristocratic status and connections, he was released.

== Attempted coup and execution ==
Schulenburg was one of the inner circle of the plotters against Hitler and was actively involved in the planning of Operation Valkyrie. He was intended by the plotters to head the Interior Ministry after Hitler had been killed. On 20 July 1944, Schulenburg was in the headquarters of the revolt, the Bendlerstrasse military intelligence headquarters in Berlin, and he was arrested there on that day, shortly after the attempt on Hitler's life had failed. On 10 August 1944 he was tried by the notorious Nazi Volksgerichtshof. In this show trial, with the infamous Nazi Roland Freisler presiding, Schulenburg explained his actions thus:

"We took upon ourselves this deed to protect Germany from a nameless misery. It is clear to me that I shall be hanged for it, but I do not rue my deed and hope that another, in a luckier moment, will undertake it."

During the trial Schulenburg conducted himself with courage and never lost his nerve. At one point Freisler, who had been addressing him throughout the trial as "Scoundrel Schulenburg," inadvertently called him by his hereditary title of "Count Schulenburg" — whereupon Schulenburg interrupted him by humorously saying, "Scoundrel Schulenburg, please!" Freisler found him guilty and sentenced him to death.

Schulenburg was executed by hanging at Plötzensee Prison in Berlin later the same day, 10 August 1944.

== Literature ==
- Ulrich Heinemann, Ein konservativer Rebell; Berlin (Siedler) 1990 (ISBN 3-88680-373-2)
- Jarvis, Edward (2023). Divided over Hitler: The Rise and Ruin of the Aristocratic Schulenburg Family. Jefferson, North Carolina: McFarland. ISBN 9781476691893.
- Albert Krebs, Fritz-Dietlof Graf von der Schulenburg. Zwischen Staatsraison und Hochverrat; Hamburg (Leibniz Vlg.) 1964
- Hans-Joachim Ramm, ... stets einem Höheren verantwortlich. Christliche Grundüberzeugungen im innermilitärischen Widerstand gegen Hitler; Neuhausen u. Stuttgart (Hänssler) 1996 (ISBN 3-7751-2635-X)

== See also ==
- List of members of the 20 July plot
- German Resistance
- Friedrich Werner von der Schulenburg

== Family ==
Two of his daughters, Charlotte and Angela, married sons of Christabel Bielenberg, Nicholas and Christopher respectively; another, Adelheid, married Grey Ruthven, 2nd Earl of Gowrie.

== Related movies ==
- The Restless Conscience (USA 1991)
