= Ferdinand von Plettenberg =

German politician (1690–1737)

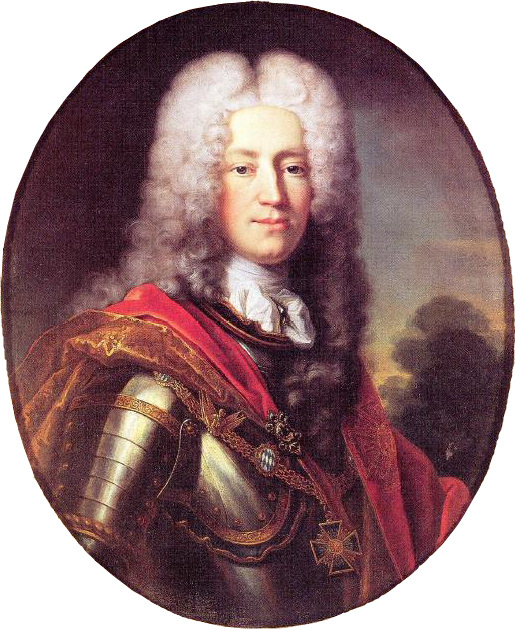
Ferdinand von Plettenberg around 1721/22, oil painting by Joseph Vivien

Baron Ferdinand Wilhelm Adolf Franz von Plettenberg, later on Count von Plettenberg und Wittem, commonly referred to as Ferdinand von Plettenberg, born July 25, 1690, in Paderborn, died March 18, 1737, in Vienna was Prime Minister of the Electorate of Cologne, Treasurer and Hereditary Marshal of Prince-elector Clemens August of Bavaria and an important supporter of Maria Theresa in the succession to the throne for the Habsburgian Erblande.
