= List of people who were executed =

This list is categorised by the reason for execution and the year of the execution is included. When a person was sentenced to death for two or more different capital crimes they are listed multiple times.

== Arson and sabotage ==
- Robert Benoist (1944)
- Guy Biéler (1944)
- Andrée Borrel (1944)
- Madeleine Damerment (1944)
- Gratien Fernando (1942)
- William Grover-Williams (1945)
- Johannes Lötter (1901)
- Marinus van der Lubbe (1934)
- Yakub Memon (2015)
- Vuyisile Mini (1964)
- Eliane Plewman (1944)
- Richard Quirin (d, 1942)
- Lilian Rolfe (1945)
- Diana Rowden (1944)
- Yvonne Rudelatt (1945)
- Roméo Sabourin (1944)
- Biswanath Sardar (1808)
- Violette Szabo (1945)
- Hannah Szenes (1944)

== Assassination ==
- Mohammad Abdullah (1871) assassination of John Paxton Norman
- Sher Ali Afridi (1872) assassination of Viceroy Lord Mayo
- Pakhomy Andreyushkin (1887) conspiracy to assassinate Russian Emperor Alexander III
- Narayan Apte (1949) assassination of Mahatma Gandhi
- George Atzerodt (1865) assassination of US President Abraham Lincoln
- Jean Bastien-Thiry (1963) attempted assassination of French President Charles de Gaulle
- John Bellingham (1812) assassination of British Prime Minister Spencer Perceval
- Eliyahu Bet-Zuri (1945) assassination of Lord Moyne
- Mehmet Arif Bey (1926) conspiracy to assassinate Turkish President Mustafa Kemal Pasha
- Mehmed Cavid Bey (1926) conspiracy to assassinate Mustafa Kemal Pasha
- Mehmed Nâzım Bey (1926) conspiracy to assassinate Mustafa Kemal Pasha
- Ziya Hurşit Bey (1926) conspiracy to assassinate Mustafa Kemal Pasha
- Dmitry Bogrov (1911) assassination of Russian Prime Minister Pyotr Stolypin
- Lee Bong-chang (1932) attempted assassination of Japanese Emperor Hirohito
- Yun Bong-gil (1932) assassination of General Yoshinori Shirakawa
- Charlotte Corday (1793) assassination of Jean-Paul Marat
- Leon Czolgosz (1901) assassination of US President William McKinley
- Madan Lal Dhingra (1909) assassination of William Hutt Curzon Wyllie
- Albert Dovecar (1962) assassination of Police Commissaire Roger Gavoury
- Reginald Dunne (1922) assassination of Field Marshal Sir Henry Wilson
- Muhammad abd-al-Salam Faraj (1982) assassination of Egyptian President Anwar Sadat
- John Felton (1628) assassination of George Villiers, 1st Duke of Buckingham
- Vasily Generalov (1887) conspiracy to assassinate Alexander III
- Sadegh Ghotbzadeh, (1982) conspiracy to assassinate Iranian Supreme Leader Ayatollah Khomeini
- Nathuram Godse (1949) assassination of Mahatma Gandhi
- Paul Gorguloff (1932) assassination of French President Paul Doumer
- Charles Guiteau (1882) assassination of US President James A. Garfield
- Abdul Khaliq Hazara (1933) assassination of Afghan King Mohammed Nadir Shah
- Eliyahu Hakim (1945) assassination of Lord Moyne
- David Herold (1865) assassination of Abraham Lincoln
- Khalid al-Islambouli (1982) assassination of Anwar Sadat
- Ivan Kalyayev (1905) assassination of Grand Duke Sergei Alexandrovich of Russia
- Lev Kamenev (1935) assassination of Sergei Kirov
- Anant Laxman Kanhere (1909) assassination of Collector A. M. T. Jackson
- Leonid Kannegisser (1918) assassination of Moisei Uritsky
- Fanny Kaplan (1918) attempted assassination of Vladimir Lenin
- Mirza Reza Kermani (1896) assassination of Iranian Shah Naser al-Din Shah Qajar
- Nikolai Kibalchich (1881) assassination of Russian Emperor Alexander II
- Aleksandr Kvyatkovsky (1880) conspiracy to assassinate Alexander II
- Kim Jae-gyu (1980) assassination of South Korean President Park Chung Hee
- Vsevolod Lebedintsev (1908) conspiracy to assassinate Russian Minister of Justice Ivan Shcheglovitov
- Roderigo Lopez (1595) attempted assassination of Queen Elizabeth I of England
- Louis Pierre Louvel (1820) assassination of Charles Ferdinand, Duke of Berry
- Naseeruddin Mauzi (1920) assassination of Robert William Douglas Willoughby
- Hafız Mehmet (1926) conspiracy to assassinate Mustafa Kemal Pasha
- Timofey Mikhailov (1881) assassination of Alexander II
- Rajnarayan Mishra (1944) assassination of Robert William Douglas Willoughby
- Faisal bin Musaid Al Saud (1975) assassination of king Faisal of Saudi Arabia
- Leonid Nikolaev (1934) assassination of Sergei Kirov
- Eligiusz Niewiadomski (1923) assassination of Polish President Gabriel Narutowicz
- Felice Orsini (1858) attempted assassination of Emperor of the French Napoleon III
- Vasili Osipanov (1887) conspiracy to assassinate Alexander III
- Joseph O'Sullivan (1922) assassination of Sir Henry Wilson
- Rüştü Pasha (1926) conspiracy to assassinate Mustafa Kemal Pasha
- Sophia Perovskaya (1881) assassination of Alexander II
- Peter, son of Töre (1198) assassination of Gertrude of Merania
- Claude Piegts (1962) assassination of Roger Gavoury
- Michael Piekarski (1620) attempted assassination of King Sigismund III
- Otto Planetta (1934) assassination of Austrian Chancellor Engelbert Dollfuss
- Lewis Powell (1865) conspiracy to assassinate Abraham Lincoln and attempted assassination of US Secretary of State William Seward
- Sayyid Qutb (1966) conspiracy to assassinate Egyptian President Gamal Abdel Nasser
- François Ravaillac (1610) assassination of King Henry IV of France
- Nikolai Rysakov (1881) assassination of Alexander II
- Petr Shevyrev (1887) conspiracy to assassinate Alexander III
- Beant Singh (1989) assassination of Indian Prime Minister Indira Gandhi
- Kehar Singh (1989) assassination of Indira Gandhi
- Satwant Singh (1989) assassination of Indira Gandhi
- Udham Singh (1940) assassination of Michael O'Dwyer
- Friedrich Staps (1809) attempted assassination of Emperor Napoleon
- Khalil Tahmasebi (1955) assassination of Iranian Prime Minister Ali Razmara
- William Thomas (1554) conspiracy to assassinate Queen Mary I of England
- U Saw (1948) assassination of Aung San
- Harikishan Talwar (1931) attempted assassination of Sir Geoffrey de Montmorency
- Nguyen Van Troi (1964) attempted assassination of Robert McNamara and future ambassador Henry Cabot Lodge Jr.
- Mary Surratt (1865) assassination of Abraham Lincoln
- Aleksandr Ulyanov (1887) conspiracy to assassinate Alexander III
- Auguste Vaillant (1894) attempted assassination of members of the French Chamber of Deputies
- Huang Yiguang (1940) attempted assassination of Wang Jingwei
- Giuseppe Zangara (1933) assassination of Chicago mayor Anton Cermak
- Andrei Zhelyabov (1881) assassination of Alexander II

== Espionage ==
- Jack Agazarian (1945)
- James J. Andrews (1862)
- Yolande Beekman (1944)
- Robert Benoist (1944)
- Guy Biéler (1944)
- Denise Bloch (1945)
- Carmelo Borg Pisani (1942)
- Andrée Borrel (1944)
- Roger Casement (1916)
- Madeleine Damerment (1944)
- Gratien Fernando (1942)
- Sasha Fillipov (1942)
- William Grover-Williams (1945)
- Nathan Hale (1776)
- Mata Hari (1917)
- Noor Inyat Khan (1944)
- Josef Jakobs (1941)
- Cecily Lefort (1945)
- Vera Leigh (1944)
- Carl Hans Lody (1914)
- John Kenneth Macalister (1944)
- Karl Heinrich Meier (1940)
- Gilbert Norman (1944)
- Sonia Olschanezky (1944)
- John Pendlebury (1941)
- Frank Pickersgill (1944)
- Eliane Plewman (1944)
- Richard Quirin (d, 1942)
- Karel Richard Richter (1941)
- Lilian Rolfe (1945)
- Julius and Ethel Rosenberg (1953)
- Diana Rowden (1944)
- Yvonne Rudelatt (1945)
- Roméo Sabourin (1944)
- Heba Selim (1974)
- Suzanne Spaak (1944)
- Violette Szabo (1945)
- Hannah Szenes (1944)
- Julio Vargas Garayar (1979)
- Josef Waldberg (1940)

== Firearm offences ==
- Chang Bock Eng (1980)
- Jimmy Chua Chap Seng (1989)
- Botak Chin (1980)
- Khor Kok Soon (2006)
- Lim Chwee Soon (1997)
- Lim Kok Yew (1984)
- Lim Thian Lai (2006)
- Ng Theng Shuang (1995)
- Ong Yeow Tian (1994)
- Sha Bakar Dawood (1976)
- Talib Haji Hamzah (1977)
- Tan Chor Jin (2009)
- Tay Cher Kiang (1980)
- Tay Chin Wah (2001)
- Teo Cheng Leong (1971)

== Military and civil conflicts, insurrections, and coups d'état ==
=== Ancient Times (pre AD 500) ===
- Demetrius (330 BC)
- Panyassis (454 BC)
- Cleopatra Selene of Syria (69 BC)
- Longinus of Selinus (498)

=== Pre-Modern Era (500-1500) ===
- Conradin (1268)
- Constantine I of Georgia (1412)
- Dafydd ap Gruffydd (1283)
- Wen Tianxiang (1283)
- David of Trebizond (1463)
- William Wallace (1305)

=== Early Modern Era (1500–1800) ===
- Marie Antoinette (1793)
- Madame du Barry (1793)
- Micaela Bastidas (1781)
- Frei Caneca (1825)
- Ștefan Cantacuzino (1716)
- King Charles I of England, Scotland, and Ireland (1649)
- Cuauhtémoc (1525)
- Daskalogiannis (1771)
- György Dózsa (1514)
- Jean-Michel Duroy (1795)
- Madame Elisabeth (1793)
- Matija Gubec (1573)
- Kryštof Harant (1621)
- Wijard Jelckama (1523)
- Matthew Keogh (1798)
- Jan Sladký Kozina (1695)
- King Louis XVI of France (1793)
- Jacques Vincent Ogé (1791)
- Johan van Oldenbarnevelt (1619)
- Jöran Persson (1568)
- Maximilien Robespierre (1794)
- Crown Prince Sado (1762)
- Louis Antoine de Saint-Just (1794)
- Tiradentes (1792)
- Dun Mikiel Xerri (1799)

=== 19th century ===
- Abushiri (1889)
- John Baird (revolutionary) (1820)
- John Brown (1859)
- Federico Fernández Cavada (1871)
- Athanasios Diakos (1821)
- Tsanko Dyustabanov (1876)
- Robert Emmet (1803)
- Charles Hindelang (1839)
- Andreas Hofer (1810)
- Agustín de Iturbide (1823)
- Georgi Izmirliev (1876)
- Hermann Jellinek (1848)
- Peer Ali Khan (1857)
- François-Marie-Thomas Chevalier de Lorimier (1839)
- Muhammad Ali Madali (1898)
- Maximilian of Mexico (1867)
- Miguel Miramón (1867)
- Francisco Morazán (1842)
- Joachim Murat (1815)
- Bhima Nayak (1876)
- Hassan bin Omari (1895)
- Gabriel Prosser (1800)
- Mateo Pumacahua (1815)
- José Rizal (1896)
- Thomas Russell (1803)
- Biswanath Sardar (1808)
- Ram Baksh Singh (1857)
- Hong Tianguifu (1864)
- William Walker (1860)
- Henry Wirz (1865)

=== 1900s ===
- Peter Handcock (1902)
- Harry "Breaker" Morant (1902)
- Gideon Scheepers (1902)

=== 1910s ===
- Mehmed Kemâl Bey (1919)
- Éamonn Ceannt (1916)
- Cornelius "Con" Colbert (1916)
- James Connolly (1916)
- Thomas Clarke (1916)
- Edward Daly (1916)
- Seán Heuston (1916)
- Eugen Leviné (1919)
- John MacBride (1916)
- Seán Mac Diarmada (1916)
- Thomas MacDonagh (1916)
- Michael Mallin (1916)
- Nicholas II and family (1918)
- Michael O'Hanrahan (1916)
- Patrick Pearse (1916)
- William Pearse (1916)
- Joseph Plunkett (1916)
- Pavel Poltoratskiy (1918)

=== 1920s ===
- Kevin Barry (1920)
- Vue Pa Chay (1921)
- Hasan Hayri (1925)
- Aleksandr Kolchak (1920)
- Maurice Moore (1921)
- Sheikh Said (1925)

=== 1930s ===
- Ibrahim Bek (1931)
- Tarakeswar Dastidar (1934)
- Amada García (1938)
- Umar al-Mukhtar (1931)
- Seyid Riza (1937)
- Surya Sen (1934)
- Lý Tự Trọng (1931)

=== 1940s ===
- Ion Antonescu (1946)
- Eugen Bolz (1945)
- Kurt Daluege (1946)
- Alois Eliáš (1942)
- Bogdan Filov (1945)
- Hans Frank (1946)
- Wilhelm Frick (1946)
- Amon Göth (1946)
- Arthur Greiser (1946)
- Irma Grese (1945)
- Alfred Jodl (1946)
- Ernst Kaltenbrunner (1946)
- Wilhelm Keitel (1946)
- Komarudin (1949)
- Pierre Laval (1945)
- Draža Mihailović (1946)
- Arndt Pekurinen (1944)
- Vidkun Quisling (1945)
- Joachim von Ribbentrop (1946)
- Alfred Rosenberg (1946)
- Fritz Sauckel (1946)
- Arthur Seyss-Inquart (1946)
- Eddie Slovik (1945)
- Julius Streicher (1946)
- Ferenc Szálasi (1946)
- Jozef Tiso (1947)
- Hideki Tōjō (1948)
- Tomoyuki Yamashita (1946)

=== 1950s ===
- King Faisal II of Iraq (1958)
- Dedan Kimathi (1957)
- Moshe Marzouk (1955)
- Juan José Valle (1956)
- Larbi Ben M'hidi (1957)
- Imre Nagy (1958)
- Evagoras Pallikarides (1957)

=== 1960s ===
- Adolf Eichmann (1962)
- Ernesto Guevara (1967)
- Évariste Kimba (1966)
- Patrice Lumumba (1961)
- Adnan Menderes (1961)
- Hasan Polatkan (1961)
- Chris Soumokil (1966)
- Fatin Rüştü Zorlu (1961)

=== 1970s ===
- Ignatius Kutu Acheamphong (1979)
- Salim Rubai Ali (1978)
- Akwasi Afrifa (1979)
- Fred Akuffo (1979)
- Zulfikar Ali Bhutto (1979)
- Long Boret (1975)
- Francisco Caamaño (1973)
- Amir Abbas Hoveida (1979)
- Endelkachew Makonnen (1974)
- Alphonse Massamba-Débat (1977)
- Sisowath Sirik Matak (1975)
- Francisco Macías Nguema (1979)

=== 1980s ===
- Hameed Baloch (1981)
- Maurice Bishop (1983)
- Elena Ceaușescu (1989)
- Nicolae Ceaușescu (1989)
- Diarra Traoré (1985)
- Henri Zongo (1989)

=== Since 1990 ===
- Saddam Hussein (2006)
- Ahmad Ibrahim al-Sayyid al-Naggar (2000)
- Tal'at Fu'ad Qasim (1995)

== Murder ==
- Zainal Abidin Abdul Malik (1996)
- Shaiful Edham bin Adam (1999)
- Ariffin Agas (2002)
- Jack Alderman (2008)
- Clarence Ray Allen (2006) most recent execution in California
- Peter Anthony Allen (1964) one of the last two executions in the UK
- Johan Alfred Ander (1910) last execution in Sweden
- Lloyd Leo Anderson (1965) last person executed by gas chamber in Missouri
- Sunny Ang (1967)
- James Arcene (1885)
- Ahmad Najib Aris (2016)
- Herbert Rowse Armstrong (1922)
- Hesham Ashmawy (2020)
- Hıdır Aslan (1984) last execution in Turkey
- James Autry (1984)
- Jean-Charles-Alphonse Avinain (1867)
- Manny Babbitt (1999)
- Billy Bailey (1996)
- Wesley Baker (2005) last execution in Maryland
- John Battaglia (2018)
- Jereboam O. Beauchamp (1826)
- Noah Beauchamp (1842)
- Grete Beier (1908) last woman publicly executed in the Kingdom of Saxony
- Derek Bentley (1953) pardoned
- Rodney Berget (2018)
- Brandon Bernard (2020)
- Wilford Berry Jr. (1999) first post-Gregg execution in Ohio
- Bhabani Prasad Bhattacharya (1935)
- Manoranjan Bhattacharya (1932)
- Pradyot Kumar Bhattacharya (1933)
- Kenneth Biros (2009) also rape, robbery, and sexual penetration
- Jesse Bishop (1979) first post-Gregg execution in Nevada
- Ramakrishna Biswas (1931)
- Hippolyte Visart de Bocarmé (1851)
- Gerald Bordelon (2010)
- Charu Chandra Bose (1909)
- Khudiram Bose (1908)
- Alfred Bourgeois (2020)
- Charles Brooks Jr. (1982) first post-Gregg execution in Texas
- Cal Coburn Brown (2010) last execution in Washington
- Claude Buffet (1972)
- Ted Bundy (1989)
- Henry John Burnett (1963) last execution in Scotland
- Edwin Bush (1961)
- Elizabeth Butchill (1780)
- Frederick Bywaters (1923)
- Charles Campbell (1994)
- Jérôme Carrein (1977)
- Beatrice Cenci (1599)
- Brajakishore Chakraborty (1934)
- Marco Allen Chapman (2008) most recent execution in Kentucky
- Dhananjoy Chatterjee (2004)
- Michael David Clagett (2000)
- Botak Chin (1981)
- Andrew Chou Hock Guan (1975)
- David Chou Hock Heng (1975)
- Pramod Ranjan Choudhury (1926)
- Styllou Christofi (1954)
- James Lee Clark (2007)
- Terry D. Clark (2001) first post-Gregg execution in New Mexico and last execution in New Mexico
- James Cobern (1964) last person executed for robbery in the United States
- Robert Glen Coe (2000) first post-Gregg execution in Tennessee
- Wilbert Coffin (1956)
- Charles Coleman (1990) first post-Gregg execution in Oklahoma
- Robert Dale Conklin (2005)
- Flor Contemplación (1995)
- James Copeland (1857)
- Frank J. Coppola (1982) first post-Gregg execution in Virginia
- James Corbitt (1950)
- Joseph Corcoran (2024)
- Dr. Hawley Harvey Crippen (1910)
- Ba Cụt (1956)
- Gary Lee Davis (1997) first post-Gregg execution in Colorado and last execution in Colorado
- David Thomas Dawson (2006) most recent execution in Montana
- John Dickman (1910)
- Hamida Djandoubi (1977) last execution in France
- Samuel Herbert Dougal (1903)
- Mrigendra Dutta (1933)
- Ruth Ellis (1955) last woman executed in the UK
- Gwynne Owen Evans (1964) one of the last two executions in the UK
- John Louis Evans (1983) first post-Gregg execution in Alabama
- Timothy Evans (1950) pardoned
- Jason Fairbanks (1801)
- Mona Fandey (2001)
- Samuel Flippen (2006) most recent execution in North Carolina
- Edmond Foley (1921)
- Francis Forsyth (1960)
- Francisco (1876) last execution in Brazil (former Empire of Brazil)
- Sidney Harry Fox (1930)
- Robert Alan Fratta (2023)
- John Wayne Gacy (1994)
- Ronnie Lee Gardner (2010)
- Micheal Anak Garing (2019)
- Juan Garza (2001)
- Nirmal Jibon Ghosh (1934)
- Gary Gilmore (1977) first post-Gregg execution in Utah and in the United States
- Lewis Eugene Gilbert (2003)
- Barbara Graham (1955)
- John Grant (2021)
- Jimmy Lee Gray (1983) first post-Gregg execution in Mississippi
- Carey Dale Grayson (2024)
- Oswald Grey (1962)
- Biren Datta Gupta (1910)
- Dinesh Gupta (1931)
- Orlando Cordia Hall (2020)
- James Hanratty (1962)
- Donald Harding (1992) first post-Gregg execution in Arizona
- Frederick John Harris (1965)
- Robert Alton Harris (1992) first post-Gregg execution in California
- Bruno Hauptmann (1936)
- Haw Tua Tau (1982)
- Neville Heath (1946)
- Gary M. Heidnik (1999) most recent execution in Pennsylvania
- Dustin Higgs (2021) most recent execution by the United States federal government
- Joe Hill (1915)
- Paul Jennings Hill (2003)
- Taberon Honie (2024) most recent execution in Utah
- Murray Hooper (2022)
- Mark Hopkinson (1992) first post-Gregg execution in Wyoming and last execution in Wyoming
- Walter Horsford (1898)
- Paul Augustus Howell (2014)
- Took Leng How (2006)
- Huang Lin-kai (2025)
- James W. Hutchins (1984) first post-Gregg execution in North Carolina
- James Inglis (1951)
- Paul Irniger (1939)
- Kho Jabing (2016)
- Mohammed Ali bin Johari (2008)
- Corey Johnson (2021)
- Ernest Lee Johnson (2021)
- Shannon Johnson (2012) last execution in Delaware
- Louis Jones Jr. (2003)
- Quintin Jones (2021)
- Juliana (ca. 1542)
- Muhammad Kadar (2015)
- Michalis Karaolis (1956)
- İbrahim Kaypakkaya (1973)
- Marvallous Keene (2009)
- Ned Kelly (1880) and armed robbery
- William Kemmler (1890)
- Thomas Kent (1916)
- Charles Kerins (1944)
- Karl-Otto Koch (1945)
- François Claudius Koenigstein (1892)
- S. Nagarajan Kuppusamy (1999)
- Pierre François Lacenaire (1836)
- LaGrand brothers (1999)
- Lela Pandak Lam (1877)
- Donnie Cleveland Lance (2020)
- Jeffrey Landrigan (2010)
- Terry Langford (1998)
- Lau Lee Peng (2000)
- William Emmett LeCroy Jr. (2020)
- Daniel Lewis Lee (2020)
- Ledell Lee (2017)
- Antoine Léger (1824)
- Leong Siew Chor (2007)
- Anthony Ler (2002)
- Teresa Lewis (2010)
- José Gregorio Liendo (1973)
- Adrian Lim (1988) notorious child killer in Singapore
- Lim Chin Chong (1998)
- Peter Lim Swee Guan (1975)
- Raymond Lisenba (1942) last execution by hanging in California
- Clayton Lockett (2014)
- Howard Long (1939) last execution in New Hampshire
- Theerasak Longji (2018) most recent execution in Thailand
- Johannes Lötter (1901)
- Arthur Lucas (1962) one of the last two executions in Canada
- Daryl Mack (2006) most recent execution in Nevada
- Patrick Maher (1921)
- Solomon Mahlangu (1979)
- Mahsuri (1819)
- Kelvin Malone (1999)
- Mampuru II (1883)
- Michael Manning (1954) last execution in the Republic of Ireland
- Leslie Dale Martin (2002)
- Jason Massey (2001)
- Robert Lee Massie (2001)
- Mahmood Hussein Mattan (1952) pardoned
- Robert McGladdery (1961) last execution in Northern Ireland
- Dennis McGuire (2014)
- Duncan McKenzie (1995) first post-Gregg execution in Montana
- Harold McQueen Jr. (1997) first post-Gregg execution in Kentucky
- Philippa Mdluli (1983) last execution carried out to date by Eswatini
- Daisy de Melker (1932)
- George Mercer (1989) first post-Gregg execution in Missouri
- Louisa May Merrifield (1953)
- Anthony Miller (1960) last teenager executed in the UK
- Vuyisile Mini (1964)
- Lezmond Mitchell (2020)
- Anantahari Mitra (1926)
- Benjamin Moloise (1985)
- Lisa Marie Montgomery (2021)
- Thomas Hartley Montgomery (1873) only Irish policeman sentenced to death for murder
- Carey Dean Moore (2018) most recent execution in Nebraska
- Harry Charles Moore (1997) most recent execution in Oregon
- Patrick Moran (1921)
- William Morva (2017) last execution in Virginia
- Leon Moser (1995)
- Norishyam s/o Mohamed Ali (1999)
- Shukri Mustafa (1978)
- Mun Se-gwang (1974)
- Khwan-On Natthaphon (2002)
- Keith Dwayne Nelson (2020)
- Hester Rebecca Nepping (1812)
- Susan Newell (1923) last woman executed in Scotland
- Solomon Ngobeni (1989) last execution in South Africa
- Oh Laye Koh (1995)
- Harold Lamont Otey (1994) first post-Gregg execution in Nebraska
- Gary Otte (2017)
- Freddie Eugene Owens (2024)
- Elijah Page (2007) first post-Gregg execution in South Dakota
- Anath Bondhu Panja (1933)
- Zsiga Pankotia (1961)
- Russell Pascoe (1963)
- Ronald Phillips (2017)
- Harry Pierpont (1934)
- Guenther Podola (1959) last execution in the UK for the murder of a policeman
- Victor Prévost (1880)
- Wesley Ira Purkey (2020)
- Willie James Pye (2024)
- Christian Ranucci (1976)
- Kanesan Ratnam (2003)
- Charles Rhines (2019) most recent execution in South Dakota
- Paul Ezra Rhoades (2011)
- Joseph Riaud (1876)
- James Terry Roach (1986)
- Alfred Rouse (1931)
- Ramkrishna Roy (1934)
- Buck Ruxton (1936)
- Sacco and Vanzetti (1927)
- Gopinath Saha (1924)
- Ahmed Salim (2024)
- August Sangret (1943)
- Utuwankande Sura Saradiel (1864) and armed robbery
- Richard Schuh (1949)
- Jay D. Scott (2001)
- Frederick Seddon (1912)
- Joseph Carl Shaw (1985) first post-Gregg execution in South Carolina
- Laurence Shirley, 4th Earl Ferrers (1760)
- Baikuntha Shukla (1934)
- Roshan Singh (1927)
- Bhagat Singh (1931)
- Sukhdev (1931)
- Shivaram Rajguru (1931)
- Ahmad Isma'il 'Uthman Saleh (2000)
- Võ Thị Sáu (1952)
- Boysie Singh (1957)
- Jaturun Siripongs (1999)
- Elmo Lee Smith (1962) last person executed by the electric chair in Pennsylvania
- James Smith (1962)
- James Edward Smith (1990)
- John Eldon Smith (1983) first post-Gregg execution in Georgia
- Kenneth Eugene Smith (2024) first execution by nitrogen hypoxia
- Sandra Smith (1989) last woman executed in South Africa
- John Spenkelink (1979) first post-Gregg execution in Florida
- John Frederick Stockwell (1934)
- Robert Austin Sullivan (1983)
- John Edward Swindler (1990) first post-Gregg execution in Arkansas
- Tan Chee Wee (2004)
- Tan Kheng Ann (1965) mastermind of the Pulau Senang prison riots, which led to four murders of prison officers and the subsequent executions of Tan and 17 other rioters
- Teo Boon Ann (1990)
- Teo Kim Hong (1996)
- Steven Ray Thacker (2013)
- John Thanos (1994) first post-Gregg execution in Maryland
- Edith Thompson (1923)
- Thomas Martin Thompson (1998)
- Norman Thorne (1925)
- Maksa Tohaiee (1993)
- Too Yin Sheong (1999)
- Thomas Traynor (1921)
- Karla Faye Tucker (1998)
- Ronald Turpin (1962) one of the last two executions in Canada
- Robert Van Hook (2018) most recent execution in Ohio
- William Vandiver (1985)
- Christopher Vialva (2020)
- Hans Vollenweider (1940) last execution in Switzerland
- Charles Walker (1990) first post-Gregg execution in Illinois
- Berthold Wehmeyer (1949)
- Keith Wells (1994) first post-Gregg execution in Idaho
- Thomas Whelan (1921)
- Jerry White (1995)
- Alfred Charles Whiteway (1953)
- Dennis Whitty (1963)
- Keith Daniel Williams (1996)
- Marcel Wayne Williams (2017)
- Robert E. Williams (1997)
- Robert Wayne Williams (1983) first post-Gregg execution in Louisiana
- Thomas Williams (1942)
- Rhoda Willis (1907) last woman executed in Wales
- Mimi Wong, the first female offender to be executed in Singapore since its independence in 1965 (1973)
- Joseph Wood (2014)
- Nathaniel Woods (2020)
- Ronald Woomer (1990)
- Eric Wrinkles (2009)
- Edmund Zagorski (2018)
- Keith Zettlemoyer (1995) first post-Gregg execution in Pennsylvania
- William G. Zuern Jr. (2004)

=== Mass murder ===
- Zar Ajam (2011)
- Floyd Allen (1913)
- Ali Amrozi bin Haji Nurhasyim (2008)
- Fritz Angerstein (1925)
- Annice (1828)
- Shoko Asahara (2018)
- Bai Ningyang (2006)
- Peter Barnes (1940)
- Michael Barrett (1868) last public execution in the UK
- Bangla Bhai (2007)
- Dominick Bodkin (1740)
- Bernard Bolender (1995)
- Vernon Booher (1929)
- Lester Bower (2015)
- Yakub Memon (2015)
- Earl Bramblett (2003)
- Arthur Brown Jr. (2023)
- John Brown (1859)
- Richard Burgess (1866)
- Abel Clemmons (1806)
- Robert Raymond Cook (1960)
- William Cook (1952)
- Manuel Martínez Coronado (1998)
- Ditbardh and Josef Cuko (1992)
- Frederick Bailey Deeming (1892)
- Marion Butler Dudley (2006)
- Seiichi Endo (2018)
- Samuel Ferguson (1865)
- Giuseppe Marco Fieschi (1836)
- Marvin Francois (1985)
- James Governor (1901)
- Jack Gilbert Graham (1957)
- Joseph-Albert Guay (1951)
- Joseph Hamilton (1906)
- Robert Wayne Harris (2012)
- George Hassell (1928)
- Olga Hepnarová (1975)
- Richard Hickock (1965)
- Kenichi Hirose (2018)
- Daniel Hittle (2000)
- Daryl Holton (2007)
- Dustin Honken (2020)
- Hsu Tung-chih (1984)
- Huda bin Abdul Haq (2008)
- Yoshihiro Inoue (2018)
- Jin Ruchao (2001)
- Steven Judy (1981) first post-Gregg execution in Indiana
- Ajmal Kasab (2012)
- Afzal Guru (2013)
- Marcin Kasprzak (1905)
- Tomohiro Kato (2022)
- Toivo Koljonen (1943)
- James Lammers (1952)
- John D. Lee (1877)
- Vladimír Lulek (1989)
- Jeffrey Lundgren (2006)
- Vassilis Lymberis (1972) last execution in Greece
- Ma Jiajue (2004)
- Wiremu Kīngi Maketū (1842)
- David Dene Martin (1985)
- Zainuzzaman Mohamad Jasadi (2001)
- Luis Monge (1967)
- James McCormick (1940)
- Timothy McVeigh (2001) first post-Gregg execution by the United States federal government
- Anatoly Nagiyev (1981)
- Mohammad Ahman al-Naziri (1997)
- Jay Wesley Neill (2002)
- Tomomitsu Niimi (2018)
- John Filip Nordlund (1900) last execution by axe in Sweden
- Kazuaki Okazaki (2018)
- Carl Panzram (1930)
- Marguerite Pitre (1953)
- Gilbert Postelle (2022)
- Saeed al-Qashash (1999)
- Giannis and Thymios Retzos (1930)
- Généreux Ruest (1952)
- Imam Samudra (2008)
- Shi Yuejun (2008)
- Andrey Shpagonov (1995)
- George David Silva (1912)
- Ronald Gene Simmons (1990)
- Clay King Smith (2001)
- Perry Smith (1965)
- Roger Dale Stafford (1995)
- Mamoru Takuma (2004)
- Abraham Thomas (1958)
- Masami Tsuchiya (2018)
- Wang Binyu (2005)
- Wang Xiwen (1981)
- Coy Wayne Wesbrook (2016)
- William James Williams (2005)
- Hastings Arthur Wise (2005)
- Yan Yanming (2005)
- Yang Jia (2008)
- Yang Zanyun (2019)
- Thomas Young (1959)
- Andrew Zondo (1986)

=== Serial killers ===
- Frank Abbandando (1942) contract killer
- Zaven Almazyan (1973) known as "the Voroshilovgrad Maniac"
- Diogo Alves (1841) known as "the Aqueduct Murderer"
- Klaas Annink (1775) known as "Huttenkloas"
- Stephen Wayne Anderson (2002)
- Velma Barfield (1984)
- Donald Beardslee (2005)
- Martha Beck (1951) known as one of the "Lonely Hearts Killers"
- Oleksandr Berlizov (1972) known as "the Night Demon"
- Mohammed Bijeh (2005) known as "the Vampire of the Tehran Desert"
- Jake Bird (1949) known as "the Tacoma Axe Murderer"
- Oscar Ray Bolin (2016)
- William Bonin (1996)
- Gary Ray Bowles (2019)
- Judy Buenoano (1998) known as "the Black Widow"
- Ted Bundy (1989)
- Frank Carter (1927) known as "the Phantom Sniper"
- Augustine Chacon (1902) known as "the Hairy One"
- Oba Chandler (2011)
- George Chapman (1903)
- Gao Chengyong (2019) known as "the Gansu Ripper"
- The Chijon family (1995) a South Korean gang
- Andrei Chikatilo (1994) known as "the Butcher of Rostov"
- John Christie (1953)
- Eric Edgar Cooke (1964) known as "the Night Caller"
- Thomas Neill Cream (1892) known as "the Lambeth Poisoner"
- Gordon Cummins (1942) known as "the Blackout Ripper"
- Sarah Dazley (1843) known as "the Potton Poisoner"
- Williamina "Minnie" Dean (1895) only woman executed in New Zealand
- Bennie Demps (2000)
- Westley Allan Dodd (1993) first post-Gregg execution in Washington
- Martin Dumollard (1862) known as "the Monster of Montluel"
- Michael Durocher (1993)
- Theodore Durrant (1898) known as "the Demon in the Belfry"
- Amelia Dyer (1896) known as "the Ogress of Reading"
- John Errol Ferguson (2013)
- Raymond Fernandez (1951) known as one of the "Lonely Hearts Killers"
- Albert Fish (1936) known as "the Brooklyn Vampire"
- Joseph Paul Franklin (2013)
- John Wayne Gacy (1994) known as "the Killer Clown"
- Gilles Garnier (1573) known as "the Werewolf of Dole"
- Carlton Gary (2018) known as "the Stocking Strangler"
- Donald Henry Gaskins (1991) known as "the Redneck Charles Manson"
- Harvey Glatman (1959) known as "the Glamour Girl Slayer"
- Sergey Golovkin (1996) known as "the Boa", last execution in Russia
- Fritz Haarmann (1925) known as "the Butcher of Hanover"
- John George Haigh (1949) known as "the Acid Bath Murderer"
- James Waybern Hall (1946)
- Saeed Hanaei (2002) known as "the Spider Killer"
- William Henry Hance (1994) known as "the Force of Evil"
- Robert Dale Henderson (1993)
- H. H. Holmes (1896)
- Yuri Ivanov (1989) known as "the Ust-Kamenogorsk Maniac"
- Thomas Jeffrey (1826) known as "Jeffries the Monster"
- Hélène Jégado (1852)
- Jack Harold Jones (2017)
- John Joubert (1996) known as "the Woodford Slasher"
- Willi Kimmritz (1950) perpetrator of the "Horror of the Brandenburg Forest" murders
- Yoshio Kodaira (1949) known as "the Japanese Bluebeard"
- Andrew Kokoraleis (1999) last execution in Illinois
- Vasili Komaroff (1923) known as "the Wolf of Moscow"
- Peter Kürten (1931) known as "the Vampire of Düsseldorf"
- Henri Désiré Landru (1922) known as "the Bluebeard of Gambais"
- Eddie Leonski (1942) known as "the Brownout Strangler"
- Gamal Lineveldt (1941)
- Robert Joseph "Bobby Joe" Long (2019) known as "the Adman Rapist"
- John Lynch (1842) known as "the Berrima Axe Murderer"
- Hiroshi Maeue (2009) known as "the Suicide Website Murderer"
- Ramadan Abdel Rehim Mansour (2010)
- Peter Manuel (1958) known as "the Beast of Birkenshaw"
- Nollie Martin (1992)
- Saad Iskandar Abdel Masih (1953)
- David Mason (1993)
- Hanafi Mat Hassan (2008)
- Vladislav Mazurkievitz (1957) known as "the Gentleman Killer"
- Daisy de Melker (1932)
- Igor Mirenkov (1996) perpetrator of the "Svetlogorsk Nightmare" murders
- Tsutomu Miyazaki (2008) known as "the Otaku Murderer"
- Stanislav Modzelevski (1969) known as "the Vampire of Galkovek"
- Catherine Montvoisin (1680) known as "La Voisin"
- Elifasi Msomi (1956)
- Seisaku Nakamura (1943) known as "the Hamamatsu Deaf Killer"
- Stephen A. Nash (1959)
- Earle Nelson (1928) known as "the Dark Strangler"
- Robert Nixon (1939) known as "Brick Moron"
- Gordon Stewart Northcott (1930) known as "the Ape Man"
- Paul Ogorzow (1941) known as "the S-Bahn Murderer"
- Manuel "Manny" Pardo (2012)
- Steven Brian Pennell (1992) known as "the Route 40 Killer", first post-Gregg execution in Delaware
- Marcel Petiot (1946)
- Thomas W. Piper (1876) known as "the Boston Belfry Murderer"
- Harry Powers (1932) known as "the Bluebeard of West Virginia"
- Alfredo Prieto (2015)
- Marion Albert Pruett (1999) known as "the Mad Dog"
- Iskandar Rahmat (2025)
- Gilles de Rais (1440) known as "Bluebeard"
- Daniel Remeta (1998)
- Ángel Maturino Reséndiz (2006) known as "the Railroad Killer"
- Darrell Keith Rich (2000) known as "the Hilltop Rapist"
- Stephen D. Richards (1879) known as "the Nebraska Fiend", first execution in the State of Nebraska
- Ion Rîmaru (1971) known as "the Vampire of Bucharest"
- Eric Robert (2012)
- Daniel Rolling (2006) known as "the Gainesville Ripper"
- Michael Bruce Ross (2005) first post-Gregg execution in Connecticut and last execution in Connecticut
- Edward H. Rulloff (1871) known as "the Educated Killer"
- Raya and Sakina (1920)
- Tommy Lynn Sells (2014)
- Abdullah Shah (2004) known as "Zardad's Dog"
- Simicoudza Simicourba (1911)
- Andrew Six (1997)
- Vasily Smirnov (1980) known as "the Gatchina Psychopath"
- George Joseph Smith (1915) perpetrator of the "Brides in the Bath" murders
- Arnold Sodeman (1936) known as "the Schoolgirl Strangler"
- Timothy Wilson Spencer (1994) known as "the Southside Strangler"
- Charles Starkweather (1959)
- Vladimir Storozhenko (1982) known as "the Smolensk Strangler"
- Peter Stumpp (1589) known as "the Werewolf of Bedburg"
- Nicholas Todd Sutton (2020) most recent execution via electric chair
- François Tomasini (1914)
- Jack Trawick (2009)
- Jean-Baptiste Troppmann (1870) known as "the Human Tiger"
- Joseph Vacher (1898) known as "the French Ripper"
- Sek Kim Wah (1988) Singapore's first serial killer
- Eugen Weidmann (1939) last public execution in France
- Thomas Whisenhant (2010)
- John Allen Williams known as "the Beltway Sniper"
- Kenneth Williams (2017) most recent execution in Arkansas
- Stanley Williams (2005)
- Douglas Franklin Wright (1996) first post-Gregg execution in Oregon
- Aileen Wuornos (2002)
- Elias Xitavhudzi (1960) known as "the Pangaman"
- Yang Xinhai (2004) known as "the Monster Killer"

== Piracy ==
- José Joaquim Almeida (1832)
- Peter Alston (1804)
- John Auger (1718)
- Joseph Baker (1800)
- Joseph Bannister (1687)
- Eli Boggs (1861)
- Stede Bonnet (1718)
- Satyendranath Bosu (1908)
- Joseph Bradish (1700)
- Nicolas Brigaut (1686)
- James Browne (1677)
- Roberto Cofresí (1825)
- Jacques Colaert (1600)
- Richard Coyle (1738)
- Mary Critchett (1729)
- Alexander Dalzeel (1715)
- Robert Deal (1721)
- Kanailal Dutta (1908)
- Alv Erlingsson (1290)
- John Fenn (1723)
- William Fly (1726)
- Charles Gibbs (1831)
- Pedro Gilbert (1835)
- John Golden (1694)
- Nathaniel Gordon (1862)
- John Gow (1725)
- Thomas Green (1705)
- Jean Baptiste Guedry (1726)
- Louis Guittar (1700)
- Charles Harris (1723)
- Klein Henszlein (1573)
- David Herriot (1718)
- Albert W. Hicks (1860)
- Hendrick van Hoven (1699)
- John Rackham (1720)
- Daniel Johnson (1675)
- Peter Johnson (1672)
- Edward Jordan (1809)
- John Julian (1733)
- William Kidd (1701)
- James Kelly (1701)
- Walter Kennedy (1721)
- Olivier Levasseur (1730)
- Narciso López (1851)
- Peter Love (1610)
- Matthew Luke (1722)
- Philip Lyne (1726)
- Simon Mascarino (1721)
- Samuel Mason (1803)
- Gottfried Michaelsen (1402)
- Christopher Moody (1722)
- Duncan Mackintosh (1689)
- Jan Mendoses (1615)
- Andrea Morisco (1308)
- Pedro Ñancúpel (1888)
- John Oxenham (1580)
- Cabeza de Perro (18??)
- John Prie (1727)
- John Quelch (1704)
- Walter Raleigh (1618)
- Stenka Razin (1671)
- Philip Roche (1723)
- James Skyrme (1722)
- Gustav Skytte (1663)
- Benito de Soto (1830)
- Filippo di Piero Strozzi (1582)
- Thomas Sutton (1722)
- Jacques Tavernier (1673)
- Joseph Thompson (1719)
- Jean Tristan (1693)
- Charles Vane (1721)
- Thomas Vaughan (1696)
- Rachel Wall (1789) last woman executed in Massachusetts
- Hennig Wichmann (1402)
- Magister Wigbold (1401)
- Nicholas Woodall (c.1718)
- Wang Zhi (1560)
- Chen Zuyi (1407)

== Political opponents ==
- Friedrich Akel (1941)
- Marie Bouffa (1945)
- Jacques Pierre Brissot (1793)
- André Chénier (1794)
- Galeazzo Ciano (1944)
- Vladimír Clementis (1952)
- Corneliu Zelea Codreanu (1938)
- Georges Danton (1794)
- Camille Desmoulins (1794)
- Olympe de Gouges (1793)
- İskilipli Mehmed Atıf Hoca (1926)
- Thomas Howard, 4th Duke of Norfolk (1572)
- Jüri Jaakson (1942)
- William Joyce (1946)
- Bronislav Kaminski (1944)
- Michael Kitzelmann (1942)
- Traicho Kostov (1949)
- William Laud (1645)
- Antoine Lavoisier (1794)
- Antonio Llidó (1974)
- William Alexander Morgan (1961)
- Ippolit Myshkin (1885)
- Lucreţiu Pătrăşcanu (1954)
- Viktor Pepelyayev (1920)
- Nikola Petkov (1947)
- Margaret Pole, Countess of Salisbury (1541)
- László Rajk (1949)
- Madame Roland (1793)
- Martemyan Ryutin (1927)
- Ken Saro-Wiwa (1995)
- Ivan Shcheglovitov (1918)
- Hans Scholl (1943)
- Sophie Scholl (1943)
- Alexander Schmorell (1943)
- Mohammad Musa Shafiq (1979)
- Amir Sjarifuddin (1948)
- Rudolf Slánský (1952)
- José Calvo Sotelo (1936)
- Koçi Xoxe (1949)
- Tsehafi Taezaz Aklilu Habte-Wold (1974)
- Yusuf Salman Yusuf (1949)

== Political purges ==
=== Executed during the Night of the Long Knives (all in 1934) ===
- Otto Ballerstedt
- Herbert von Bose
- Karl Ernst
- Fritz Gerlich
- Karl-Günther Heimsoth
- Edmund Heines
- Peter von Heydebreck
- Anton von Hohberg und Buchwald
- Edgar Jung
- Gustav Ritter von Kahr
- Erich Klausener
- Adalbert Probst
- Ernst Röhm
- Kurt von Schleicher
- Emil Sembach
- Bernhard Stempfle
- Gregor Strasser

=== Executed during the Great Purge ===
- Alexander Abramov-Mirov (1937)
- Valentine Adler (1942)
- Maksim Ammosov (1938)
- Zigmas Angarietis (1940)
- Ecaterina Arbore (1937)
- Sanjar Asfendiyarov (1938)
- Urunboi Ashurov (1938)
- Gaýgysyz Atabaýew (1938)
- Nedirbay Aytakov (1938)
- Isaac Babel (1940)
- Ivan Bakayev (1936)
- Alexey Bakulin (1939)
- Mikhail Batorsky (1938)
- Alexander Beloborodov (1938)
- Boris Berman (1939)
- Matvei Berman (1939)
- Konon Berman-Yurin (1936)
- Sergei Bessonov (1941)
- Anastasia Bitsenko (1938)
- Waclaw Bogucki (1937)
- Vladimir Bogushevsky (1939)
- Mikhail Boguslavsky (1937)
- Oskar Böhme (1938)
- Georgy Bondar (1939)
- Volf Bronner (1939)
- Andrei Bubnov (1938)
- Gavril Buciușcan (1937)
- Nikolay Bukharin (1938)
- Pavel Bulanov (1938)
- Samson Chanba (1937)
- Virendranath Chattopadhyaya (1937)
- Mikhail Chernov (1938)
- Vlas Chubar (1939)
- Rose Cohen (1937)
- Vladimir Ćopić (1939)
- Nikolay Dobrokhotov (1938)
- Yakov Drobnis (1937)
- Ehsanollah Khan Dustdar (1939)
- Sholom Dvolajckij (1937)
- Roberts Eidemanis (1937)
- Robert Eikhe (1940)
- Efrem Eshba (1939)
- Boris Feldman (1937)
- Abdurauf Fitrat (1938)
- George Fles (1939)
- Leo Flieg (1939)
- Lovett Fort-Whiteman (1939)
- Mikhail Frinovsky (1940)
- Aleksei Gastev (1939)
- Grigori Grinko (1938)
- Abraham Guloyan (1937)
- Abdurrahim Hojibayev (1933)
- Akmal Ikramov (1938)
- Vladimir Ivanov (1938)
- Abdullah Kadiri (1938)
- Karl Kahl (1938)
- Boris Kamkov (1937)
- Lev Karakhan (1937)
- Grigory Khakhanyan (1939)
- Karim Khakimov (1938)
- Aghasi Khanjian (1936)
- Fayzulla Khodzhayev (1938)
- Lazar Kogan (1939)
- Mikhail Koltsov (1940)
- August Kork (1937)
- Boris Kornilov (1938)
- Aleksandr Kosarev (1939)
- Stanisław Kosior (1939)
- Nikolai Krestinsky (1938)
- Pyotr Kryuchkov (1938)
- Béla Kun (1938)
- Sariya Lakoba (1936)
- Samuil Lehtțir (1937)
- Lev Levin (1938)
- Solomon Levit (1938)
- Ghulam Ambia Khan Lohani (1938)
- Nusratullo Maksum (1937)
- Vsevolod Meyerhold (1940)
- Levon Mirzoyan (1939)
- Nikolay Matorin (1936)
- Sergei Mrachkovsky (1936)
- Anna Muhammedow (1938)
- Abani Mukherjee (1937)
- Nikolay Muralov (1937)
- Nikolai Vissarionovich Nekrasov (1940)
- Osip Piatnitsky (1938)
- Boris Pinson (1936)
- Fritz Platten (1942)
- Dmitry Pletnyov (1941)
- Pavel Postyshev (1939)
- Boris Pozern (1939)
- Yevgeni Preobrazhensky (1937)
- Vitaly Primakov (1937)
- Vitovt Putna (1937)
- Georgy Pyatakov (1937)
- Karl Radek (1939)
- Abdullo Rakhimbayev (1938)
- Christian Rakovsky (1941)
- Nikolay Rattel (1939)
- Mark Rein (1937)
- Hermann Remmele (1939)
- Barbora Rezlerová-Švarcová (1941)
- Arkady Rosengolts (1938)
- Aleksey Rykov (1938)
- Timofei Sapronov (1937)
- Murat Salihov (1938)
- Rudolf Samoylovich (1939)
- Filimon Săteanu (1937)
- Leonid Serebryakov (1937)
- Dmitry Shakhovskoy (1939)
- Vasily Sharangovich (1938)
- Alexander Shliapnikov (1937)
- Shirinsho Shotemur (1937)
- Alexander Shotman (1937)
- Ivar Smilga (1938)
- Aleksandr Petrovich Smirnov (1938)
- Ivan Smirnov (1936)
- Vladimir Smirnov (1937)
- Pyotr Smorodin (1939)
- Jan Sten (1937)
- Boris Stomonyakov (1940)
- Mirsaid Sultan-Galiev (1940)
- Avetis Sultan-Zade (1938)
- Béla Székely (1939)
- Vagarshak Ter-Vaganyan (1936)
- Boris Tolpygo (1939)
- Mikhail Trilisser (1940)
- Vladimir Tsyganko (1938)
- Kasym Tynystanov (1938)
- Ieronim Uborevich (1937)
- Nikolai Uglanov (1937)
- Abdukadyr Urazbekov (1938)
- Zinovy Ushakov (1940)
- Aleksandr Uspensky (1940)
- Iosif Vareikis (1938)
- Nikolai Efimovich Varfolomeev (1939)
- Mikhail Vasilyev-Yuzhin (1937)
- Ivan Voronaev 9d. 1937)
- Alexei Voshchakin (1937)
- Gaspar Voskanyan (1937)
- Genrikh Yagoda (1938)
- Iona Yakir (1937)
- Varvara Yakovleva (1941)
- Victor Yartsev (1940)
- Grigory Yevdokimov (1936)
- Yu Xiusong (1939)
- Aleksandr Yegorov (1939)
- Yefim Yevdokimov (1940)
- Nikolai Yezhov (1940)
- Abdulhamid Yunusov (1938)
- Pyotr Zalutsky (1937)
- Isaak Zelensky (1938)
- Berthe Zimmermann (1937)
- Grigory Zinoviev (1936)
- Dimitar Zlatarev (1937)
- Prokopy Zubarev (1938)

=== Executed members of the 20 July plot ===
- Ludwig Beck (1944)
- Robert Bernardis (1944)
- Albrecht Graf von Bernstorff (1945)
- Hasso von Boehmer (1945)
- Eugen Bolz (1945)
- Dietrich Bonhoeffer (1945)
- Klaus Bonhoeffer (1945)
- Hans-Jürgen von Blumenthal (1944)
- Eduard Brücklmeier (1944)
- Wilhelm Canaris (1945)
- Walter Cramer (1944)
- Alfred Delp (1945)
- Heinrich zu Dohna-Schlobitten (1944)
- Hans von Dohnanyi (1945)
- Erich Fellgiebel (1944)
- Eberhard Finckh (1944)
- Reinhold Frank (1945)
- Friedrich Fromm (1945)
- Wessel Freytag von Loringhoven (1944)
- Ludwig Gehre (1945)
- Elisabeth and Erich Gloeden (1944)
- Carl Friedrich Goerdeler (1945)
- Fritz Goerdeler (1945)
- Nikolaus Gross (1945)
- Karl Ludwig Freiherr von und zu Guttenberg (1945)
- Hans Bernd von Haeften (1944)
- Werner von Haeften (1944)
- Albrecht von Hagen (1944)
- Nikolaus von Halem (1944)
- Georg Hansen (1944)
- Ernst von Harnack (1945)
- Paul von Hase (1944)
- Ulrich von Hassell (1944)
- Theodor Haubach (1945)
- Albrecht Haushofer (1945)
- Egbert Hayessen (1944)
- Wolf-Heinrich Graf von Helldorff (1944)
- Otto Herfurth (1944)
- Erich Hoepner (1944)
- Caesar von Hofacker (1944)
- Roland von Hößlin (1944)
- Friedrich Gustav Jaeger (1944)
- Hans John (1945)
- Otto Kiep (1944)
- Hans Georg Klamroth (1944)
- Friedrich Klausing (1944)
- Ewald von Kleist-Schmenzin (1945)
- Hans Koch (1945)
- Alfred Kranzfelder (1944)
- Carl Langbehn (1944)
- Heinrich Graf von Lehndorff-Steinort (1944)
- Julius Leber (1945)
- Ludwig Freiherr von Leonrod (1944)
- Bernhard Letterhaus (1944)
- Paul Lejeune-Jung (1944)
- Franz Leuninger (1945)
- Wilhelm Leuschner (1944)
- Hans Otfried von Linstow (1944)
- Ferdinand von Lüninck (1944)
- Hermann Maaß (1944)
- Rudolf von Marogna-Redwitz (1944)
- Michael von Matuschka (1944)
- Joachim Meichssner (1944)
- Albrecht Mertz von Quirnheim (1944)
- Joseph Müller (1944)
- Arthur Nebe (1945)
- Friedrich Olbricht (1944)
- Hans Oster (1945)
- Erwin Planck (1945)
- Kurt von Plettenberg (1945)
- Johannes Popitz (1945)
- Friedrich von Rabenau (1945)
- Adolf Reichwein (1944)
- Alexis von Roenne (1944)
- Erwin Rommel (1944)
- Karl Sack (1945)
- Joachim Sadrozinski (1944)
- Anton Saefkow (1944)
- Rüdiger Schleicher (1945)
- Ernst Schneppenhorst (1945)
- Friedrich-Werner Graf von der Schulenburg (1944)
- Fritz-Dietlof von der Schulenburg (1944)
- Ludwig Schwamb (1945)
- Günther Smend (1944)
- Franz Sperr (1945)
- Berthold Schenk Graf von Stauffenberg (1944)
- Claus von Stauffenberg (1944)
- Hellmuth Stieff (1944)
- Theodor Strünck (1945)
- Carl-Heinrich von Stülpnagel (1944)
- Fritz Thiele (1944)
- Busso Thoma (1945)
- Karl Freiherr von Thüngen (1944)
- Adam von Trott zu Solz (1944)
- Nikolaus von Üxküll-Gyllenband (1944)
- Eduard Wagner (1944)
- Hermann Josef Wehrle (1944)
- Carl Wentzel (1944)
- Josef Wirmer (1944)
- Erwin von Witzleben (1944)
- Peter Yorck von Wartenburg (1944)
- Gustav Heistermann von Ziehlberg (1945)

== Prisoners of war ==
- Alexander George Arbuthnot and Robert C. Ambrister (1818) both hanged by Andrew Jackson
- Marc Bloch (1944)
- Emilio De Bono (1944)
- Maximilian Kolbe (1941) volunteered himself in place of another
- Élise Rivet (1945)
- Elisabeth de Rothschild (1945)

== Religious figures ==
- Rabbi Akiva (c. AD 135) religious dissident
- Avvakum (1682) religious dissent
- Saint Joan of Arc (b. 1431) supposed heresy
- Bartholomew (1st century AD)
- Qutubuddin Shaheed (1648) Dawoodi Bohra Dai al Mutlaq
- Giordano Bruno (1600) heresy
- Thomas Cranmer (1556) heresy
- Cardinal John Fisher (1535) religious dissent
- Jan Hus (b. 1415) heresy
- Jacob Hutter (1536) heresy
- Saint James the Great (AD 44)
- Jesus of Nazareth (c. AD 30–36) sedition
- John Lambert (1538) heresy
- Hugh Latimer (1555) heresy
- Sir Thomas More (1535) religious dissent
- Saint Paul (c. AD 64)
- Saint Peter (c. AD 64)
- Philip the Apostle (AD 80)
- Michael Servetus (1553) heresy
- Edward Wightman (1612) heresy
- Lucilio Vanini (1619) apostasy

== Robbery and theft ==
- Manoranjan Bhattacharya (1932) armed robbery
- Ramprasad Bismil (1927), armed robbery
- Joseph Blake (1724)
- Spence Broughton (1792)
- Johannes Bückler (1803)
- Caryl Chessman (1960)
- Thomas Cox (1690)
- Isaac Darkin (1761)
- Jenny Diver (1741)
- Claude Duval (1670)
- Barbara Erni (1785), confidence trickster
- Richard Ferguson (1800)
- James Field (1751)
- James Fitzpatrick (1778)
- Eppelein von Gailingen (1381)
- Captain Gallagher (1818)
- Dimitar Obshti (1873)
- Neesy O'Haughan (1720)
- Captain Will Hollyday (1697)
- Luke Hutton (1598)
- Alexandru and Paul Ioanid (1959)
- Constantia Jones (1738)
- Thomas Edward Ketchum (1901)
- Ashfaqulla Khan (1927)
- Rajendra Lahiri (1927)
- José Gregorio Liendo (1973) armed robbery
- George Lyon (1815)
- James MacLaine (1750)
- Paulus Hector Mair (1579), embezzlement of public funds
- Étienne Monier (1913)
- Orxines (c.323 BC)
- Ishola Oyenusi (1971) multiple counts of armed robbery and carjacking
- Robert Palin (1861)
- John Poulter (1754)
- John Rann (1774)
- Jakob "Hannikel" Reinhard (1787)
- Biswanath Sardar (1808)
- Jack Sheppard (1724)
- Henry Simms (1747)
- Robert Snooks (1802)
- Amy Spain (1865), last female slave executed in the United States
- William Spiggot (d 1721)
- Dick Turpin (1739)
- Jane Voss (1684)
- Jonathan Wild (1725), corruption
- Ann Wyley (1777), only black person executed in Michigan

== Sexual offences ==
=== Homosexuality ===
- Katherina Hetzeldorfer (1477), first recorded execution for lesbianism.
- John Atherton (1640), Bishop of Waterford and Lismore
- Jacopo Bonfadio (1550), Italian humanist and historian
- Francesco Calcagno (1550), Venician Franciscan friar.
- Giovanni di Giovanni (1365), 15-year-old Italian boy charged with being "a public and notorious passive sodomite"
- Lisbetha Olsdotter (1679), Swedish cross-dresser and early female soldier (disguised as a man).
- Dominique Phinot (c.1556), French composer of the Renaissance
- James Pratt and John Smith (1835), last two executions for sodomy in the UK
- Tibira do Maranhão (1614), Brazilian Tupinambá executed for sodomy by French colonizers
- Mervyn Tuchet (1631)

=== Sexual assault ===
==== Rape ====
- Amnon (year unknown) incestual rape
- Akshay Thakur (2020) gang rape and murder of Jyoti Singh Pandey
- Mukesh Singh (2020) gang rape and murder of Jyoti Singh Pandey
- Pawan Gupta (2020) gang rape and murder of Jyoti Singh Pandey
- Vinay Sharma (2020) gang rape and murder of Jyoti Singh Pandey
- John A. Bennett (1961) and attempted murder
- Robert David Bennett (1932) last execution in Australia for a crime other than murder
- Rainey Bethea (1936) last public execution in the United States
- Jacques Chausson (1661) attempted homosexual rape of a young nobleman
- Caryl Chessman (1960)
- Richard Cornish (1625) homosexual rape of an endentured servant
- Carlo Fantom (1643)
- Thomas Knapton (1833)
- José Gregorio Liendo (1973)
- Martinsville Seven (1951) group of seven men convicted of gang rape
- William McGee (1951)
- Julius Morgan (1916)
- Jeremiah Reeves (1958)
- Mustapha Tabet (1993) police commissioner convicted of the kidnap and sexual assault of over 500 women, last execution in Morocco
- Mervyn Tuchet (1631)

==== Paedophiles ====
- Mahmoud Asgari and Ayaz Marhoni (2005)
- Leo Echegaray (1999)
- Li Feng (2003)
- Luo Yanlin (2008)
- Ronald Wolfe (1964)

==== Other sex offences ====
- Claudine de Culam (1601) bestiality
- Thomas Granger (1642) bestiality
- Atefeh Rajabi (2004) adultery

== Smuggling ==
- Rosman Abdullah (2024), drug trafficking
- Roger Casement (1916) arms trafficking
- Roslan Bakar and Pausi Jefridin (2024), drug trafficking
- Kevin Barlow and Brian Chambers (1986), drug trafficking
- Andrew Chan (2015), drug trafficking
- Ong Ah Chuan (1981), drug trafficking
- Low Hong Eng (1981), drug trafficking
- Johannes van Damme (1994), drug trafficking
- Nagaenthran K. Dharmalingam (2022), drug trafficking
- Vladislav Faibishenko and Yan Rokotov (1961)
- Norasharee Gous (2022), drug trafficking
- Arthur Gray (1748)
- Derrick Gregory (1989), drug trafficking
- Tony de la Guardia (1989), drug trafficking
- Rodrigo Gularte (2015), drug trafficking
- Thomas Kingsmill (1749)
- Louis Mandrin (1755)
- Michael McAuliffe (1993), drug trafficking
- Marco Archer Moreira (2015), drug trafficking
- Shanmugam Murugesu (2005), drug trafficking
- Van Tuong Nguyen, (2005), drug trafficking
- Abdul Kahar Othman (2022), drug trafficking
- Akmal Shaikh (2009), drug trafficking
- Kalwant Singh (2022), drug trafficking
- Myuran Sukumaran (2015), drug trafficking
- Iwuchukwu Amara Tochi (2007), drug trafficking
- Zahra Bahrami (2011), drug trafficking
- Rozman Jusoh (1996), drug trafficking
- Cheuk Mei-mei (1994), drug trafficking
- Elke Tsang Kai-mong (1994), drug trafficking
- Daniel Chan Chi-pun (1995), drug trafficking
- Tong Ching-man (1995), drug trafficking
- Poon Yuen-chung (1995), drug trafficking
- Angel Mou Pui-peng (1995), drug trafficking
- Vignes Mourthi (2003), drug trafficking
- Yen May Woen (2004), drug trafficking
- Yu Huaying (2025), human trafficking
- Mohamed Shalleh Abdul Latiff (2023), drug trafficking
- Saridewi Djamani (2023), drug trafficking
- Tangaraju Suppiah (2023), drug trafficking

== Treason ==
- Afzal Guru (2013)
- Yakub Memon (2015)
- Antonio Osorio de Acuña (1526)
- John Amery (1945)
- George Johnson Armstrong (1941)
- Humphrey Arundell (1550)
- Hristo Atanasov (1908)
- Anthony Babington (1586)
- John Baird (1820)
- Thomas Baker (1381)
- John Ball (1381)
- John Ballard (1586)
- Thomas Bates (1606)
- Jerome Bellamy (1586)
- Nikos Beloyannis (1952)
- Lavrenty Beria (1953)
- Thomas Blount (1400)
- Jeremiah Brandreth (1817)
- John Brown (1859)
- Thomas Bryan (1921)
- Archibald Cameron of Lochiel (1753)
- Roger Casement (1916)
- Thomas Cranmer (1556)
- Niren Dasgupta (1915)
- William Davidson (1820)
- Edward Despard (1803)
- Everard Digby (1606)
- Dragutin Dimitrijević (1917)
- Henry Donn (1586)
- Patrick Doyle (1921)
- José María de Torrijos y Uriarte (1831)
- Guy Fawkes (1606)
- Gratien Fernando (1942)
- Cardinal John Fisher (1535)
- Henri de Fleury de Coulan (1666)
- Frank Flood (1921)
- Jopie Fourie (1914)
- Simon Fraser, 11th Lord Lovat (1747)
- Robert Gage (1586)
- Joseph Garang (1971)
- Deniz Gezmiş (1972)
- John Grant (1606)
- Llywelyn ap Gruffydd Fychan (1401)
- Fethi Gürcan (1964)
- Jack Hall (1716)
- Andrew Harclay, 1st Earl of Carlisle (1323)
- Andrew Hardie (1820)
- Cai Hesen (1931)
- Milada Horáková (1950)
- Thomas Howard, 4th Duke of Norfolk (1572)
- John Hussey, 1st Baron Hussey of Sleaford (1537)
- Kanao Inouye (1947)
- Baillie of Jerviswood (1684)
- William Joyce (1946)
- Robert Keyes (1606)
- Nguyễn Thị Minh Khai (1941)
- Stanisław Kunicki (1886)
- William Laud (1645)
- Christopher Layer (1723)
- Vasil Levski (1873)
- Samuel Lount (1838)
- Johannes Lötter (1901)
- Marinus van der Lubbe (1934)
- Abdel Khaliq Mahjub (1971)
- Peter Matthews (1838)
- Afanasi Matushenko (1907)
- Vuyisile Mini (1964)
- Qazi Mohammad (1947)
- Sir Thomas More (1535)
- David Morgan (1746)
- Mengistu Neway (1961)
- Michel Ney (1815)
- John Nisbet (1685)
- Arnaldo Ochoa (1989)
- José Olaya (1823)
- Johan van Oldenbarnevelt (1619)
- Anzavur Ahmed Pasha (1921)
- Henry Pedris (1915)
- Eleonora Fonseca Pimentel (1799)
- Vishnu Ganesh Pingle (1915)
- Pir of Pagaro VI (1943)
- Carmelo Borg Pisani (1942)
- Louis Riel (1885)
- Ambrose Rookwood (1606)
- Julius and Ethel Rosenberg (1953)
- Bernard Ryan (1921)
- Fahmi Said (1941)
- Salah al-Din al-Sabbagh (1945)
- Policarpa Salavarrieta (1817)
- Mahmud Salman (1942)
- Heba Selim (1974)
- Kamil Shabib (1944)
- Pyotr Schmidt (1906)
- Theodore Schurch (1946)
- Duncan Scott-Ford (1942)
- Manoranjan Sengupta (1915)
- Abu Taher (1976)
- Arthur Thistlewood (1820)
- Chidiock Tichborne (1586)
- Francis Towneley (1746)
- Thomas Usk (1388)
- Julio Vargas Garayar (1979)
- Andrey Vlasov (1946)
- Perkin Warbeck (1499)
- Richard Whiting (1539)
- James Wilson (1820)
- Robert Wintour (1606)
- Thomas Wintour (1606)
- John Wrawe (1382)
- Thomas Wyatt the Younger (1554)
- Lucius Annaeus Seneca (A.D. 65)
- Socrates (B.C. 399)

== See also ==
- Capital punishment
- Capital punishment in Canada
- Capital punishment in the People's Republic of China
- Capital punishment in India
- Capital punishment in New Zealand
- Capital punishment in the United Kingdom
- Capital punishment in the United States
- Lists of people executed in Texas
- Lists of people executed in the United States (1900–1972)
- Lists of people executed in the United States since 1976
