= Manoranjan Bhattacharya =

Manoranjan Bhattacharya may refer to:

- Manoranjan Bhattacharya (writer) (1903–1939), Bengali children's writer
- Manoranjan Bhattacharya (revolutionary) (1910–1932), Indian independence activist and Bengali revolutionary

== See also ==
- Monoranjan Bhattacharya, Indian footballer and manager
