= Robert Willoughby =

Robert Willoughby may refer to:

- Robert Willoughby, 1st Baron Willoughby de Broke (1452–1502), one of the chief commanders against the Cornish rebels for Henry VII
- Robert Willoughby, 2nd Baron Willoughby de Broke (1472–1521), English peer
- Robert Willoughby, 6th Baron Willoughby de Eresby (c.1385 – 1452), English baron and soldier in the Hundred Years' War
- Robert Hugh Willoughby (1921–2018), American flute player and teacher
- Robert William Douglas Willoughby, administrator in British India
