= Mangal Purana =

- Short story by Manoranjan Bhattacharya
- Translator: Bodhisattva Chattopadhyay
- Country: India
- Language: Bengali
- Genre: Science Fiction

Publication
- Published in: Ramdhanu Magazine
- Publisher: Montage
- Publication date: 1931
- Published in English: 2024

Chronology
- Series: Notun-purana
| Bikarna Parba | Vaidya- purana |

Mangal Purana is a science fiction short story written by Manoranjan Bhattacharya, a prominent Bengali science fiction author of the 20th century. This work initially appeared in the young adult magazine Ramdhanu in 1931. It is the third among the six stories of the 'Notun Purana' series. Among other works of Bhattacharya, it is recognised as important science fiction produced in the vernacular during the British colonial period in Bengal.

== Author ==
Manoranjan Bhattacharya (1903–1939) was a fiction writer, translator, and editor who contributed extensively to children's and young adult literature. A professor at Ripon College, Bhattacharya's contribution to Bengali fiction took a significant shift when he became the editor of the third issue of the periodical Ramdhanu, a periodical established by his father Bisweswar Bhattacharya. He remained the editor of Ramdhanu until the end of his life. Apart from science fiction, he contributed to a variety of Bengali prose fiction in the form of novels, short stories, and plays, encompassing comic fiction, mystery, adventure, and other genres. His works were championed by Bengali literary stalwarts such as Satyajit Ray, Premendra Mitra, Shibram Chakrabarty, etc.

== Plot ==
The story begins with an air of tension at Kaurava Lodge, the residence of the Kauravas. The speculation arises about whether they are going to have another bloody war, but the modern demands and intervention of the League of Nations have made it impossible for any war to happen, considering the well-being of the common citizens. Then the narrator describes how, at a party at Kaurava Lodge, Subhadra, the wife of Arjuna and half-sister of Krishna, wore the Syamantaka jewel, causing Duryodhana's wife to become jealous—so much so that she trapped herself in the Gosaghor after the Pandavas left in their Rolls Royce.

Duryodhana is concerned about his wife's health since influenza is rampant in the city. He cursed Krishna and sent a broker to Vasuki, the lord of Nagas, to buy his Nagmani. To his dismay, the broker informs him about the fuel shortage in the underworld—the duopoly between American Rockefeller and Burma Oil Company has created a dire situation—the Nagmanis remaining the only source of light.

Duryodhana then contacts Kubera and learns that he possesses Lord PennyWanting's three famous jewels—‘Matchless,’ ‘Priceless,’ ‘Worthless’—the last was yet to be sold. On Duryodhana's command, Jayadratha and Bhurisharva leave for Alka in an airplane, buy the jewel, but delay returning. Out of choice, Duryodhana contacts the Sahadeva Institute, established by Nobel Prize-winning astrologer and Pandava brother Sahadeva, to find the jewel's whereabouts. The report says that the jewel has somehow reached Mars.

There is also a public discourse going on about how Earthlings can embark on Mars, a planet speculated to be much more advanced than the Earth, and Viswakarma and Co. are on their way to make a rocket for a mission to Mars.

Duryodhana reads this news in Hastinapur Times, a newspaper. His brother Dushashana volunteers to go to Mars to find the jewel, along with the motivation to triumph over the Pandavas in fame. This news is published in the headline of Hastinapur Times.

But he goes missing. The Sahadeva Institute is contacted, and they deliver the news that, albeit the rocket has reached Mars, the passengers are in great trouble. This brings Gandhari, who has recently returned from her pilgrimage, to tears and restlessness. Dhritarashtra's blood pressure rises so much that Yudhisthira keeps Ghatotkach on alert to fetch Visalyakarani from Gandhamadan mountain in an emergency. Gandhari then asks Bhima to persuade his elder brother Hanuman to rescue Dushashana. Bhima relents and reaches ‘Kala-Bhavan,’ a banana orchard in Kishkindha where his brother is spending his life in retirement. Even though Hanuman is not that interested at first, he is ultimately persuaded by his younger brother. He sets off for Mars.

Hanuman finds Mars as an almost utopic paradise, much better than Earth in abundance. He spots football-like Martians; the weight of evolution has made them football-shaped, only with a head. He then spots Dushanana, Dr. Goyter, and other missing humans who are put in cages for zoological exhibition. At first, moved by anger, he thought if he could set the place ablaze with a matchstick. But upon realizing that the Martians were a highly advanced civilization in scientific progression, he instructed the humans to grab his tail or tie his tail to the cage. With that, he flew from Mars and landed on Hastinapur.

At Earth Duryodhana listens to his brother's story and feels it to be inappropriate to ask about the jewel. Dushashana gets triggered whenever he hears about Mars.

== Characters ==
Almost all the characters are taken from the Indian epics - Ramayana and Mahabharata, and set in a quasi-mythical, fantastical world that has made scientific progress, closely reflecting the contemporary colonial Indian conditions.

Arjuna - Mythological character from the epic Mahabharata appears with the same name and designation. A famous archer among the Pandavas. In this story, the League of Nations declares that he should depose his spiritual weapon, the bow Gandiva, so they deposit it at the Imperial Bank to ensure peace. He also won Olympic medals.

Bhima - Brother to Arjuna, the strongest warrior among the Pandavas and a mythological character from the epic Mahabharata, appears with the same name and designation. His weapon is a mace. At the request of Gandhari, he persuades his elder brother, Hanuman—a mythical character from the epic Ramayana—to go find Dushashana on Mars.

Bhurishrava - A character from the Mahabharata who was an ally of the Kauravas in the war of Kurukshetra. In this story, he, along with Jayadratha, went by airplane to Alka to fetch the famous jewel ‘Worthless’ from Kubera.

Dhritarashtra - Mythological character from Mahabharata, father of the Kauravas. Due to his blindness, he can't control his son's course of actions. In this story, he has high blood pressure.

Duryodhana - Character from Mahabharata, the eldest among the Kauravas. He lives in the Kaurava lodge along with his wife, brothers, and allies. In this story, he schemes to triumph over the Pandavas and bring a jewel for his wife better than Subhadra has.

Duryodhana's wife - Mythological character from Mahabharata. In this story, she gets jealous of a jewel Subhadra has and confines herself in the ‘gosaghor’ (the chamber of anger).

Dr. Goyter - The only original character in this story, probably a scientist, is rescued by Hanuman along with Dushashana and other humans trapped by the advanced civilization on Mars and put into cages for something like a zoological exhibition.

Gandhari - Character from Mahabharata, mother of the Kauravas, wife of Dhritarashtra. In this story, she returns from her pilgrimage, learns about Dushashana going missing, and has regular fainting spells. She requests Bhima to persuade his elder brother, Hanuman, to go to Mars and save Dushashana.

Hanuman - Character from Ramayana and elder brother to Bhima and son of the wind god. In this story, he is shown to have retired to a ‘Kala-Bhavan’ in Kishkindha, a banana orchard with varieties of bananas. He loves bananas. Following his younger brother's persuasion, he goes to Mars and rescues Dushashana and others.

Jayadratha - A character from the Mahabharata who was an ally of the Kauravas in the war of Kurukshetra. In this story, he, along with Bhurishrava, went by airplane to Alka to fetch the famous jewel ‘Worthless’ from Kubera.

Krishna - Mythological character from Mahabharata, an avatar of Lord Vishnu who guides Pandavas. He is related to the Pandavas. He has a half-sister named Subhadra. In this story, Subhadra goes to the party at Kaurava lodge wearing the jewel, Syamantaka, given to Krishna.

Kubera - 'The god of wealth in the Hindu pantheon. In this story, he is shown to possess three famous jewels of Lord PennyWanting — ‘Matchless,’ ‘Priceless,’ ‘Worthless.’ Duryodhana buys the third jewel from him, which eventually gets lost to Mars.

Martians - The inhabitants of Mars. They are described as an advanced civilization to the Earthlings, championing scientific excellence and evolution. Their bodies have only heads, so they look like footballs. They put all the humans in a cage and exhibit them zoologically.

Sahadeva - The mythological character from the Mahabharata, one of the Pandavas. In this story, he is a Nobel Prize-winning astrologer, and he runs the famed Sahadeva Institute on a mountaintop in peaceful, cold Kasauli.

Subhadra - Mythological character from the Mahabharata, half-sister to Krishna. In this story, she mistakenly packs Krishna's Syamantaka jewel on her way back home. She wears this jewel to the party at Kaurava lodge, and Duryodhana's wife becomes jealous of her.

Vasuki - Mythical character from Hindu mythology. He is the lord of Nagas in the underworld. According to the myths, they have glowing Nagmanis on their heads. Duryodhana tries to buy one, but due to peculiar circumstances, Vasuki does not sell his Nagmani to Duryodhana.

Yudhisthira - Mythological character from Mahabharata, the eldest among the Pandavas and the son of God Dharma. He is virtuous and peace-loving. In this story, he persuades his brother Arjuna to deposit his spiritual weapon at the Imperial Bank lest the people go on a hunger strike.

== Series ==
This story belongs to the ‘Notun Purana' series, a collection of six stories published between 1931 and 1936 in Ramdhanu magazine. The stories are by the chronology of publication - Lanka-kanda, Bikarna-parba, Mangal-puran, Baidya-puran, Dhenkibahoner Kalanka-bhanjan and Iyanki-parba.

== Anthology and Republication ==
This story was republished in 2023 by Kalpabiswa Publications under the anthology titled 'Manoranjan Bhattacharya Rachanasamagra 1,' edited by Santu Bag in Bengali.

== Translation ==
The English translation, titled 'Martian Purana,' can be found in the 2022 anthology published by the MIT Press, 'The Inhuman and Other Stories: A Selection of Bengali Science Fiction,' translated and edited by Bodhisattva Chattopadhyay.

== Bibliography ==
Chattopadhyay, Bodhisattva. The Inhuman and Other Stories : A Selection of Bengali Science Fiction . The MIT Press, 2024 ISBN 978-0-262-37804-8 (Pdf)

Bhattacharya, Manoranjan. Manoranjan Bhattacharya Rachonasamagra 1, edited by Santu Bag. Montage publication. 2023 ISBN 978-81-963287-6-4.
