= Władysław Mazurkiewicz =

Władysław Mazurkiewicz may refer to:

- Ladislao Mazurkiewicz (1945–2013), Uruguayan football goalkeeper
- Władysław Mazurkiewicz (physician) (1871–1933), physician and professor at University of Warsaw who helped Józef Piłsudski escape prison in St. Petersburg
- Władysław Mazurkiewicz (serial killer) (1911–1957), Polish serial killer
