= Alexander Dalzeel =

Scottish pirate and privateer

Alexander Dalzeel (Note: Last name alternately Dalzeel, Dalzell, Dalziel, Dolzell, or Dolzel.) (died 1715) was a Scottish pirate and privateer who sailed in French service. Details on Dalzeel's early life - his supposed career under pirate Henry Every and exploits against the Spanish - appears almost entirely in Alexander Smith's 1720 collection "A Compleat history of the lives and robberies of the most notorious highwaymen," (Note: Smith's criminal biographies were often reprinted with slightly different titles and lists of articles. They were sometimes attributed to Charles Johnson, the pseudonymous author of A General History of the Pyrates, whose pirate biographies are often mixed with Smith's in reprints. See here for an example.) while his later activities are corroborated by newspaper accounts and trial records.

== Early history (purported) ==
Born in Port Patrick, Scotland, Dalzeel went to sea as a child and, by the age of 23, was captain of his own ship with six successful voyages to his credit. Earning a reputation for dishonesty, Dalzeel arrived in Madagascar in 1685 and soon enlisted into the ranks of Captain Avery. According to pirate lore, Dalzeel participated in the capture of the treasure ship Ganj-i-Sawai, which carried The Great Mogul's daughter to her arranged marriage. Every, who had decided to take her as his own wife, gave Dalzeel his own ship and crew within Every's fleet. Dalzeel would continue to serve under Every until finally leaving for the West Indies on his own.

However, upon their arrival in the Caribbean, the pirates' search for targets was fruitless. With their supplies slowly running short, starvation began to set in before a Spanish vessel was sighted. As the ship came into view, Dalzeel realized the Spanish ship was a well-armed Spanish war galleon which had presumably become separated from its escorts. Despite their ship's smaller size, Dalzeel gave orders to close in on the ship. Although the Spanish ship's captain had been informed of the pirate ship's presence earlier, he felt it too small to be a threat and retired to his cabin for a game of cards. As the ship approached the galleon, Dalzeel ordered a hole to be drilled in the side of his own ship so that his crew would be forced to fight to the death. Caught completely off guard, the Spaniards offered little resistance as Dalzeel's crew boarded the galleon. Within minutes the ship was theirs and, storming into the captain's quarters, they demanded his surrender at gunpoint.

After sailing his prize to Jamaica, Dalzeel was apprehended while attempting to capture a fleet of twelve Spanish pearl ships escorted by a Spanish man-o-war. In exchange for his surrender, Dalzeel and his crew were not forced into slavery or hard labor, as was common practice for captured pirates. Released ashore, Dalzeel made his way back to Jamaica. There he began outfitting another ship and was soon sailing for Cuba. Again his outnumbered crew was captured by a Spanish naval patrol of three warships bound for Havana, where he was sentenced to be hanged at sea. Dalzeel, however, quickly made his escape after stabbing a guard and using two empty jugs to float to shore. Soon encountering another band of pirates, Dalzeel was able to convince them to attack and successfully capture the warship which had held him prisoner. As the pirates neared Jamaica, their ship sank in a sudden storm although Dalzeel was able to survive the storm in a canoe.

Reports of Dalzeel's activities under Every may have come from his own bragging: The Original Weekly Journal and The Weekly Journal or British Gazetteer from December 1715 both reported that Dalzeel boasted of "one of Avery's Accomplices," and had spent "two years among the Pirates of Madagascar," though no other sources corroborate this. Smith's Compleat History was known to have printed "mythical" stories of other criminals.

== Later history ==
During the War of the Spanish Succession, Dalzeel commanded the vessel Agrippa and was granted a commission by the French as a privateer. A Jacobite, Dalzeel sailed under the banner of James Stuart, who had fled to France after his father James II was deposed in the 1688 Glorious Revolution. He enjoyed considerable success against British and allied nations before his eventual capture. Taken back to England, he was tried and convicted in 1712 of treason and sentenced to be hanged, drawn and quartered. However, at the behest of the Earl of Mar, Dalzeel received a royal pardon. Upon his release he sailed for French waters, where he captured a French ship near Le Havre. He then had the captured crew's necks tied to their heels and thrown overboard to watch them drown. Eventually captured in Scotland, (Note: Dalzeel was arrested while trying to arrange passage to Sweden to serve as a privateer in Swedish service, as had fellow Jacobite pirate John Norcross.) he was returned to London, tried and convicted of piracy.

Paul Lorrain ministered to the imprisoned Dalzeel and found him "a pernicious and dangerous person; of a morose, stubborn, and ill disposition by nature," and "so brutish and so obstinate that he would not be satisfied with anything I offered to him in this matter, saying, he hated to see my face, and would not attend in the Chapel." Lorrain had acted as translator at Dalzeel's trial, presenting evidence in French for the English court. Because of this, Dalzeel blamed Lorrain for his sentence: "[Dalzeel] with his dying breath declared that I was the cause of his death, and he would do me some mischief or other before he died, or haunt me afterwards." Dalzeel even threatened to kick Lorrain down the stairs and tear up the Bible Lorrain had offered him. He later apologized and asked forgiveness, but "whether that repentance was sincere, and not too late, was much to be doubted."

Dalzeel was hanged on 15 December 1715.

== See also ==
- Nathaniel Grubing and John Golden, two English Jacobite pirates who, like Dalzeel, sailed under French commissions
