= Rajnarayan Mishra =

- Born: Bhikhampur, Lakhimpur Kheri, British India
- Movement: Indian Independence movement

Rajnarayan Mishra was an Indian socialist and freedom fighter of Indian Independence movement. Hanged on 9 December 1944, he was one of the last Indian independence fighters to be executed by British colonial authorities. The East India Company built Willoughby Memorial Hall in 1924 in memory of Sir Robert William Douglas Willoughby, Deputy Commissioner of Kheri who was killed on 26 August 1920. The colonial authorities apprehended independence activists Naseeruddin Mauzi Nagar and Rajnarayan Mishra on charges of shooting the Deputy Commissioner, and sentenced them to death by hanging. On 26 April 1936, Willoughby Memorial Library was established. The Willoughby Memorial Hall was recently renamed the Naseeruddin Memorial Hall.
