= Peer Ali Khan =

Indian revolutionary (1812–1857)

- Born: 1812; Muhammadpur, Azamgarh district, Uttar Pradesh (then British India)
- Died: 7 July 1857 (aged 44–45)
- Cause of death: Capital punishment
- Occupation: Bookbinder
- Known for: Indian freedom movement Indian Rebellion of 1857

Peer Ali Khan (1812 – 7 July 1857) was an Indian revolutionary and rebel, who participated in the Indian independence movement. He was given capital punishment for participating in the freedom struggle of 1857.

== Biography ==
Peer Ali Khan was born around 1812 at Patna, Bihar in India. Khan was a bookbinder by profession and he used to secretly distribute important leaflets, pamphlets and coded messages to freedom fighters. He conducted regular campaigns against the British government and played a leading role in the organization of the Great Revolt of 1857 in the Patna District in July 1857.

He was arrested along with his 33 followers on 4 July 1857.

On 7 July 1857, Khan was hanged in full public view by William Tayler, the then commissioner of Patna, along with 14 other rebels, include Ghasita Khalifa, Ghulam Abbas, Nandu Lal alias Sipahi, Jumman, Maduwa, Kajil Khan, Ramzani, Peer Bakhsh, Peer Ali, Wahid Ali, Ghulam Ali, Mahmood Akbar and Asrar Ali Khan.

== Commemoration ==
A road adjacent to the Patna Airport is named after him by Nitish Kumar's government in 2008. Also, Shaheed Peer Ali Khan Park, a children's park in front of the District Magistrate's residence near the Gandhi Maidan in Patna, was named after him by the State Government of Bihar.
