= 1976 Balestier Road shooting =

1976 armed holdup and shooting incident in Singapore

- Police Constable Neo Koon San, who survived the shooting while confronting the gunmen
- Location: Balestier, Singapore
- Date: 18 October 1976
- Attack type: Robbery; Shooting incident Gunfight
- Weapons: .38 Colt revolver (Chang); Dagger (Tay)
- Deaths: 0
- Injuries: 3 (including one gunman Chang)
- Victims: Neo Koon San (23); Chan Chin Tong (55)
- Perpetrators: Chang Bock Eng (30); Tay Cher Kiang (28)
- Charges: Chang; Illegal discharge of firearms Tay; Association with an individual in possession of firearms
- Verdict: Chang found guilty of unlawfully discharging his firearm with intent to cause harm Tay found guilty of being an accomplice to a person wielding a firearm Chang and Tay were sentenced to death on 26 August 1977; Chang and Tay were hanged on 9 May 1980
- Convictions: Chang; Illegal discharge of firearms Tay; Association with an individual in possession of firearms
- Convicted: Chang Bock Eng (30); Tay Cher Kiang (28)
- Judge: F A Chua; D C D'Cotta

On 18 October 1976, two armed robbers, Tay Cher Kiang (郑芝强 Zhèng Zhīqiáng) and Chang Bock Eng (庄木荣 Zhuāng Mùróng), held several people hostage at a paint shop in Balestier Road, Singapore in an attempt to commit armed robbery, and during the holdup, Chang, who wielded a revolver, engaged in a gunfight with the police, injuring a police constable named Neo Koon San (梁坤山 Liáng Kūnshān) during the confrontation. Both Chang and Tay were subsequently arrested and charged under the Arms Offences Act for the unauthorized use of firearms. Both Chang and Tay were found guilty and sentenced to death in August 1977, and they were hanged on 9 May 1980 after exhausting all avenues of appeal, which all ended with failure.

== Armed holdup and gunfight ==
On the evening of 18 October 1976, at a paint shop in Singapore's Balestier Road, an armed hold-up by two gunmen took place at the shop itself, followed by a gunfight that broke out between the gunmen and the police.

On the day in question, at the paint shop, two armed robbers, one wielding a dagger and the other wielding a .38 Colt revolver, barged into the shop and held a total of three people hostage; the hostage trio consisted of the shop's 55-year-old owner Chan Chin Tong (曾振栋 Zēng Zhèndòng), his 57-year-old sister-in-law Kang Geok Hun (康玉云 Kāng Yùyún) and Kang's 41-year-old nephew Chan Tai Peow (曾太宝 Zēng Tàibǎo). One of the robbers held the hostages at gunpoint and demanded them to hand over their valuables. While the hostages handed over their money to the robbers, a female passer-by witnessed the hold-up and called the police.

Two patrol cars later arrived at the scene upon the making of the police report. The first police officer to arrive at the scene was 23-year-old Police Constable (PC) Neo Koon San, who drove the first patrol car to the scene. As soon as PC Neo alighted the car, he was shot in the right upper arm and thumb by the gunman, and therefore collapsed on the ground, and the fallen officer's colleague, 34-year-old police sergeant Tan Kah Kiau (陈家健 Chén Jiājiàn), who drove the other patrol car, went inside the shop to confront the gunman. A brief shoot-out therefore took place in the shop between Sergeant Tan and the gunman, who was holding Chan Chin Tong at gunpoint during the shoot-out. Eventually, Sergeant Tan managed to wound the gunman in the stomach and subdued him with the help of several other arriving policemen.

The injured gunman was therefore arrested and taken to Singapore General Hospital for treatment while under police custody, and the second perpetrator, who was also hurt during the gunfight, had fled and police were still tracing his whereabouts, and sent a team of officers to conduct a manhunt for the accomplice in the nearby area; his dagger was abandoned at the scene of crime. As for PC Neo and Chan Chin Tong, the latter who was injured on the shoulder by a stray bullet, they were both rushed to Toa Payoh Hospital for immediate treatment, and both of them survived their injuries. Likewise, the gunman, who was in critical condition when he was first admitted in the hospital, survived after undergoing a surgery, and he was subsequently transferred to Changi Prison Hospital to continue recovering from his gunshot wounds.

In the aftermath of the shoot-out, the police commissioner Tan Teck Khim commended the two police officers present at the scene for their courage and utmost efforts to fulfill their line of duty during the shooting incident, and the member of the public for reporting the matter to the police on time. PC Neo and Chan both later recovered from their injuries.

== Investigations ==
While he was still hospitalized, the injured gunman, identified as 30-year-old Chang Bock Eng, was charged with firing a revolver at Police Constable Neo Koon San three days prior Meanwhile, the police continued to search for Chang's accomplice and they also established his identity. The accomplice, who was a member of a notorious gang of robbers, was arrested less than a week after during a police round-up, which also oversaw the capture of another eight gang members. The accomplice, identified as 29-year-old Tay Cher Kiang, was charged for being an accomplice of Chang with the knowledge that Chang possessed and would use a firearm to commit a crime.

As the death sentence was mandated under the Arms Offences Act for the unlicensed use of firearms in Singapore, both Chang and Tay would be handed the death penalty if found guilty. The two men were remanded to assist in investigations while pending trial for their roles in the shoot-out. Prior to this, the Arms Offences Act was first enacted in 1973 in an attempt by the government of Singapore to reduce the rates of gun-related crime and violence in Singapore.

In November 1976, both Tay and Chang were brought back to court to face additional charges for unrelated crimes they committed prior to the armed hold-up at Balestier Road. Tay and Chang were both accused of robbing a 40-year-old Ng Lee Sing of S$16,300 at MacPherson Road on 20 October 1975, and the both of them were also charged with robbing a 39-year-old Chew Chin Lee of S$3,000 at Ramlai Road on 26 May 1976. On both occasions, Chang was also armed with a revolver while Tay wielded a knife on the second robbery.

Apart from the crimes he and Tay committed together, Chang was also solely responsible for three more criminal cases that occurred before the shoot-out. Chang had stolen a motorcycle worth S$1,500 from a man named Leong Kaw at Geylang in August 1975, and he also committed two robberies in August 1975 and July 1976 respectively, and he made off with a watch worth S$350 and about $5,200 in cash from both these robberies. In total, Chang faced five fresh charges while Tay had another two criminal charges pending against him for the unrelated cases he and Chang got involved in. All the while since October 1976, the pair were remanded in prison while awaiting trial for the shooting incident at Balestier Road.

== Trial ==
Chang Bock Eng, who faced the gallows for shooting at a police officer during the armed confrontation.

Tay Cher Kiang, who also faced the death penalty for being an accomplice of Chang during the shoot-out.

In August 1977, Tay Cher Kiang and Chang Bock Eng stood trial at the High Court for their roles in the armed holdup and gunfight. Chang faced one count of unlawful discharge of a firearm with intent to cause harm under Section 4 of the Arms Offences Act, while Tay faced one count of being an accomplice of a person at the scene of a firearm offence under Section 5 of the Arms Offences Act. Although both charges were of a different nature, they both carried the death penalty. The trial, which was presided by both Justice Dennis Cosmos D'Cotta (D C D'Cotta) and Justice Frederick Arthur Chua (F A Chua), was delayed at one point due to one of the defendants, Chang, falling ill during the proceedings and was therefore unfit to stand trial. Throughout the trial, Tay was represented by defence lawyer Lim Chye Huat while Chang was represented by both A Ramanujan and R Doraisamy.

The prosecution, led by Lawrence Ang and Theresa Teh, presented to the court that both men had entered the paint shop with intention to commit armed robbery, and the turn of events that ultimately led to the gunfight. The court was told that after Chang and Tay intruded the shop and held the shop owner Chan Chin Tong and his two other relatives hostage, Chang forced Chan's nephew to go open up the shop's safe, while Tay was told to guard both Chan and his sister-in-law Kang Geok Hun. Kang appeared as a witness and said that she heard Chang threatening to shoot Chan, and she was also forced to hand over her two diamond rings to the two armed men, who also managed to reap S$1,000 from the hostages. Police Constable Neo Koon San, who was promoted to Corporal by August 1977, appeared in court to testify that Chang had threatened to shoot Chan, when the gunman was confronted by the police officers that arrived at the shop, and he also testified how he was being shot at by Chang while he tried to intervene in the situation. PC Ho Yu Chon, another police officer present at the scene, testified that he heard the gunshot coming from inside the shop and Corporal Neo was therefore injured, before Sergeant Tan Kah Kiau (who also became a witness) gunned down Chang and arrested him, after Chang did not heed Sergeant Tan's request to surrender. An 18-year-old clerk Ng Gek Lang, who was the final witness out of 27 prosecution witnesses, testified that she heard a couple of gunshots outside her house, and she also witnessed one man running into the house of her neighbour Chua Hang Piow, and later, she saw police entering Chua's house and came out with a shirt, which the prosecution argued was worn by Tay before he removed it and changed into another shirt prior to his escape.

Based on the statements given by Chang to Inspector R Balasubramaniam, who recorded the statements with the help of a female interpreter Chi Pin Hoon during Chang's hospitalization, Chang denied that he opened fire inside the paint shop. Chang told the inspector that he never meant to shoot the gun and harm anyone, and he claimed that when he held Chan at gunpoint, he was shot on the arm and dropped his gun, and somehow heard another gunshot, and he never knew how Corporal Neo was shot in spite of him not firing the gun throughout the confrontation. As for Tay, he denied that he gave his statements voluntarily, and Tay, who was a self-confessed heroin addict, claimed that during police interrogation, he was suffering from drug withdrawal symptoms and was full of discomfort, and he was not fit to give his account to the police, and sought to have his statements ruled inadmissible as evidence.

At the close of the prosecution's case, the trial court ruled that there was a case for both Chang and Tay to answer, and they both elected to put up their defence after the court told them to enter their defence. Chang, who was the first to testify on the stand, told the court that it was not an intentional shooting. He testified that he never intended to use the gun to harm anyone, and he only used it to threaten the hostages at gunpoint and demand the money from them. Chang said that when he was confronted by the policemen, he never fired the gun and only aimed it at Chan Chin Tong's head, verbally threatening to shoot Chan if any of the policemen came nearer to him. Chang testified that he heard a shot ringing out during a brief struggle between him and the policemen and Chan cried out in pain, while he himself felt his right hand turned numb and he dropped the gun before the police closed in to him and subdued him. As for Tay, he stated that he was unaware of the revolver in Chang's possession, and he only realized that Chang was armed with the revolver but he stayed on out of fear of Chang, and Tay also said his role was only limited to being a look-out and guarding the hostages while Chang did most of the dirty work.

On 26 August 1977, after a trial lasting 11 days, the two trial judges - Justice F A Chua and Justice D C D'Cotta - delivered their verdict. Justice Chua, who pronounced the decision in court, stated that the two judges found that Chang had indeed deliberately fired the revolver at Corporal Neo, and he did so with the intention and motive to cause physical harm to the policeman, and it was therefore not an accidental shooting as what Chang insisted in his defence. Turning to Tay's role in the shoot-out, Justice Chua cited that Tay had the knowledge that Chang was armed with a revolver and he knew that it would be potentially used during the course of armed robbery, and he never took steps to prevent Chang from using the firearm, and he was effectively considered to be in voluntary association with Chang and consorting with a man armed with a firearm. Based on these findings, the two trial judges concluded that there are sufficient grounds to convict both accused of all the respective charges preferred against them.

Therefore, 31-year-old Chang Bock Eng was found guilty of unlawfully discharging his firearm with intent to cause harm under Section 4 of the Arms Offences Act, while 29-year-old Tay Cher Kiang was found guilty under Section 5 of the Arms Offences Act for being an accomplice of Chang during the course of the offence Chang committed. For their respective convictions, both Chang and Tay were sentenced to death by hanging.

== Appeal processes ==
On 21 February 1979, both Chang Bock Eng and Tay Cher Kiang, who were represented by P Suppiah and J B Jeyaretnam respectively, submitted appeals to the Court of Appeal, the highest court of Singapore, to review their convictions and sentences. However, the Court of Appeal's three-judge panel - consisting of Chief Justice Wee Chong Jin and two Supreme Court judges Choor Singh and T S Sinnathuray - dismissed the appeals and upheld the trial ruling.

After the dismissal of their appeals, both Chang and Tay filed legal motions for special leave to appeal to the Privy Council in London against their convictions and sentences, but the Privy Council dismissed the motion on 2 November 1979, and therefore confirming the death penalty for the condemned pair.

As a final recourse to be spared the gallows, both Tay and Chang made a final death row plea for clemency to the President of Singapore with hopes to commute their death sentences to life in prison. However, then President Benjamin Sheares rejected their petitions and finalized their death sentences.

== Execution of the robbers ==
On 9 May 1980, after eating their last breakfast, 34-year-old Chang Bock Eng and 31-year-old Tay Cher Kiang were both hanged in Changi Prison at dawn. Tay and Chang were the eighth and ninth persons to be put to death under the Arms Offences Act since 1973, and before the pair, there were seven people (including "Bakar Negro" Sha Bakar Dawood) executed in four previous cases prosecuted under the Act.

A Singaporean Chinese newspaper Sin Chew Jit Poh published an exclusive article about the case two days following the double executions of Tay and Chang. It was used as a case example to remind readers, especially those of young age, to not commit crimes, especially those that attract capital punishment which might lead to them losing their lives.

== See also ==
- Arms Offences Act
- Capital punishment in Singapore
- List of major crimes in Singapore
