= Jacques Tavernier =

French privateer

- Born: c. 1625; France
- Died: 1673; Havana, Cuba
- Piratical career
- Nickname: Le Lyonnais
- Type: Buccaneer
- Allegiance: France
- Years active: c. 1664-1673
- Rank: Captain
- Base of operations: Caribbean
- Commands: le Tigre
- Battles: Raid of Maracaibo (1666); Raid of Porto Bello (1666); Raid of Panama (1671)

Jacques Tavernier or Le Lyonnais (c. 1625–1673) was a French privateer and buccaneer supposedly active in the Caribbean during the mid-17th century. His existence has since been disputed among modern historians as little to no pre-19th century evidence exists prior to his entry in Appletons' Cyclopedia in 1889. He first arrived in the West Indies as a member of French privateering expeditions in the Gulf of Mexico and later became a buccaneer when hostilities ceased between France and Spain. Tavernier served under numerous buccaneers including Laurent van Graaf, Michel de Grandmount, Jacques Nau, Pierre le Picard and Sir Henry Morgan among others in his career, however he himself did not rise to command his own command largely due to his illiteracy.

Around 1664, Tavernier was captain of the 12-gun Le Perle and successfully raided the coasts of Venezuela, Panama, Cuba and Mexico. He also took part in the capture in Maricaibo in 1666, Portobelo in 1667 and Morgan's raid against Panama in 1671. He and Bradley attacked Spanish shipping in the Bay of Honduras during this time.

While returning from a recent voyage in 1673, Tavernier encountered two Spanish men-of-war. One of these ships took fire early in the fight and was forced to head for the coast while the other was boarded by Tavernier and his men. They had nearly captured the vessel when a sudden squall broke the cables holding the two ships together and trapping the buccaneers. Finding themselves unable to retreat to their own ship, they chose to continue fighting. When Tavernier was severely wounded, the crew lost their will to fight and eventually surrendered. The dying captain was taken to nearby Havana where he was convicted of piracy and was publicly executed.
