= John Prie =

Pirate in the Caribbean (d.1727)

- Died: 1727; Execution Dock
- Cause of death: Hanged
- Occupation: Pirate
- Criminal charges: Murder and piracy
- Criminal penalty: Death by hanging
- Piratical career
- Base of operations: Caribbean
- Commands: Young Lawrence

John Prie (died 1727) was a minor pirate in the Caribbean.

== History ==
In 1727 Prie and some associates staged a mutiny aboard the Dutch-flagged ship Young Lawrence during a cruise in the West Indies. Prie murdered the Captain and declared himself Master of the ship. The mutineers were caught and tried in London. Prie tried to frame fellow sailor John Ashley for the murder, who responded with a profanity-laced tirade. Prie was convicted for both murder and piracy and sentenced to hang. He was hanged at Execution Dock, then gibbeted in chains opposite the town of Woolwich in July 1727.

== See also ==
- Admiralty court – The trial court which condemned Prie.
