= Marie Bouffa =

Righteous Among the Nations

Marie Rachel Eudoxie Bouffa
- Born: 19 January 1882; Comblain-au-Pont, France
- Died: 1 February 1945 (aged 63); Ravensbrück, Germany
- Known for: Resistance fighter
- Parents: Nicolas Joseph Adolphe Bouffa (father); Clarisse Catherine Josèphe Antoine (mother)

Marie Rachel Eudoxie Bouffa (Comblain-au-Pont, 19 January 1882 – Ravensbrück, 1 February 1945) was a member of the Belgian resistance during World War II and recognized as Righteous Among the Nations.

== Biography ==
Marie Rachel Bouffa was the daughter of Nicolas Joseph Adolphe and Clarisse Catherine Josèphe Antoine.

In 1942, single and 58 years old, Bouffa owned and operated a guest house called "la Ferme de la Chapelle" (The Farm of the chapel), which was a part of her large estate in Belgium. On September 15 of that year, an emissary was sent by the command of Belgium's Secret Army to her community, La Reid, near Liege, to set up a local group to resist the occupying German forces. Bouffa, who was not Jewish, became the first member on 1 December 1942.

Bouffa helped a variety of people fleeing oppression. She was known to shelter resistance fighters, those fleeing compulsory labor, escaped prisoners and downed Allied airmen, all being hunted down by the enemy. In addition to providing a safe hiding place, she provided false documents and helped identify an escape route. She also distributed works by the underground press, transmitted military intelligence and stored arms and ammunition.

A simplified version of the medal awarded to those who are named Righteous Among the Nations.

Beginning in August 1942, Bouffa also hid, for two years, a Jewish family, the seven members of the Sluchny family, who had fled their home in Antwerp, Belgium after authorities began deporting the Jews living there.

The family was living with Bouffa when, one day, a neighbor told her that the Gestapo were on their way to search the premises. She quickly moved the Sluchnys to a neighboring village, Queue-du-Bois and, after the immediate danger had passed, she had the family returned to her protection, living in a building behind a large wall on her estate.

On 17 February 1944 another surprise search took place. The Jewish family managed to escape the raid, moving on to other hiding places, but Bouffa was caught and arrested by the Gestapo.

Bouffa was deported to a concentration camp for women in northern Germany, Ravensbrück, where she was executed on 1 February 1945.

== Recognition ==
On 30 July 2008 Yad Vashem recognized her as "Eudoxie Bouffa" as Righteous Among the Nations, which is recognition given to "non-Jews who took great risks to save Jews during the Holocaust."
