= Saad Iskandar Abdel Masih =

Executed Egyptian serial killer

- Born: 1911; Asyut, Egypt
- Died: February 25, 1953 (aged 41–42); Alexandria, Egypt
- Cause of death: Execution by hanging
- Other names: "The Butcher of Karmouz"; George Abd al-Salam; George Abdul-Malik
- Convictions: Murder x3 Attempted murder x2
- Penalty: Death x2 Life imprisonment x2

Details
- Victims: 3–19+
- Span of crimes: 1948–1951
- Country: Egypt
- States: Asyut, Alexandria
- Date apprehended: November 1951

Saad Iskandar Abdel Masih (1911 – February 25, 1953), known as The Butcher of Karmouz (Arabic: سفاح كرموز), was an Egyptian serial killer who killed at least three people in Asyut and Alexandria from 1948 to 1951 during thefts. For his known crimes, he was sentenced to death and subsequently hanged in 1953.

== Life and first murders ==
Saad Iskandar Abdel Masih was born in Asyut in 1911, the younger of two brothers. Little is known of his childhood, but Masih was regarded as a handsome young man who charmed the ladies. He worked at a cotton mill owned by his older brother, where he soon began an affair with a wealthy widow. Enticed by her riches, he killed her on an unspecified date in 1948, stole her money and then fled to Alexandria.

Once he arrived, he rented a small cotton mill in the Jabal Nafeh area. To attract potential victims, Masih would place a chair on the sidewalk and wait, and when he spotted a young woman, he would often entice them either with promises of a job in the textile industry or simply with his good looks. Once inside his shop, he would proceed to kill them using knives or cleavers. For several months in 1948, numerous young girls and women were reported missing from the Alexandria area, but none of them could be conclusively linked to any single perpetrator.

In early September, Masih decided to rob the house of his wealthy neighbor, a 90-year-old woman named Bamba. He knocked on her door, and Bamba, thinking that one of her sons had come to check in on her, opened it. Upon doing so, Masih put his hand over her mouth and dragged her inside, before he grabbed a nearby cleaver and struck her on the head. The woman cried out in pain, causing him to strike her again, definitively killing her. Masih then stole whatever money he could find, but on his way out, he came across a young woman, Qaquta, who lived on the ground floor. Curious about the scream she had just heard, she wanted to know what had happened, with Masih assuring her that Bamba was just praying loudly. He invited her inside, but when Qaquta turned her back on him, Masih struck her with the cleaver on the back of the head, leaving her for dead.

Hours later, she was found by one of her sons and driven to the hospital, where she miraculously recovered and identified her assailant as the "brother" of Fatima, her neighbor. As a result, Masih, who had been portraying himself as the woman's brother, was arrested, but denied any knowledge of the crime. At his trial, Masih's lawyer managed to convince the counsel that his client had been erroneously arrested, successfully securing his release. For the next two years, Masih kept a low profile, and eventually the case faded from public memory.

== Final crimes and arrest ==
In October 1951, Masih rented a yarn store on the Mahmoudiyah Canal, which was near a popular route for travelling merchants. One day, he invited a cloth merchant inside the store, ostensibly to inspect his wares, but when the man sat down on the chair, Masih pulled out his cleaver and decapitated him in one blow. After robbing the man of all his goods, he buried the head and the body in his barn.

The following month, Masih attempted to kill a grain merchant whom he had lured into his shop, but the man managed to escape and alerted authorities. By the time authorities arrived on the scene, he had already fled, but an excavation of the premises revealed human bones and body parts. The discovery shocked the nation, with newspapers covering his crimes daily. In an attempt to escape capture, Masih decided to flee back to his home town on a transit bus, but the vehicle was stopped on the outskirts of Asyut during a routine car inspection. Lieutenant Fakhry Abdel-Malik examined the passengers, eventually reaching Masih and asking him for his name. Initially, he claimed that his name was "George Abd al-Salam", but after the lieutenant asked him to repeat it, he changed it to "George Abdul-Malik". Noticing the discrepancy, Abdel-Malik realized that he was the wanted fugitive and immediately arrested him.

== Trial, sentence and execution ==
Immediately following his arrest, Masih was transferred to Alexandria for trial. While it was believed that he was responsible for at least 19 murders, he was only charged with three murders, two attempted murders and several cases of theft. Masih was subsequently convicted on all charges, receiving two death sentences on the murder charges and two life terms for the remaining charges.

For the next two years, Masih was housed on death row at Al-Hadra Prison while his attorney, Professor Albert Barsoum, attempted to have his sentence commuted. The effort was unsuccessful, and on February 25, 1953, Saad Iskandar Abdel Masih was hanged. Prior to his execution, the still-smiling murderer thanked Barsoum for his efforts, and his final request was that he be given cigarettes and a glass of water.

== See also ==
- List of serial killers by country
