= Ivan Voronaev =

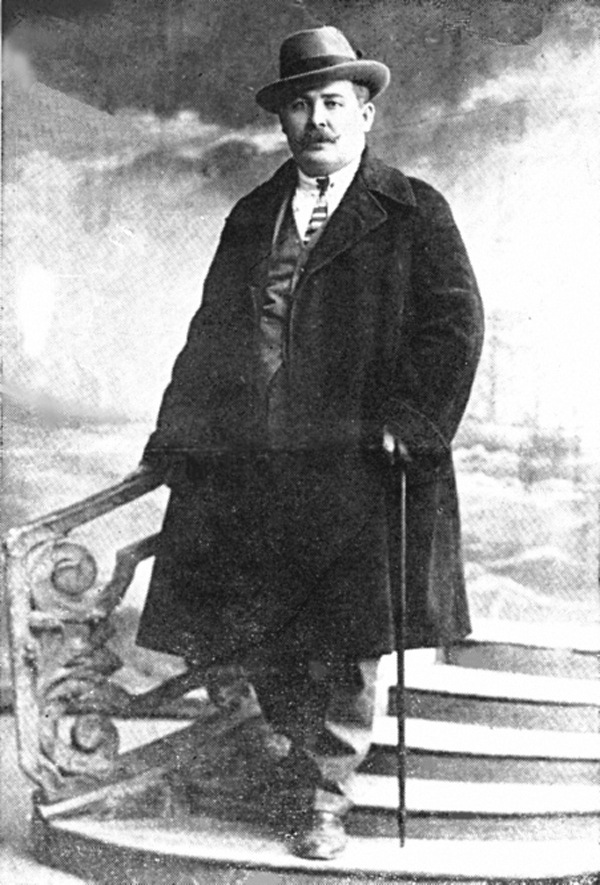
- Ivan Voronaev

Personal details
- Born: April 16, 1885 Orenburg, Russian Empire
- Died: November 5, 1937 (aged 52) Soviet Union
- Spouse: Ekaterina Bashkirova
- Occupation: Pastor; Bishop; Preacher; Missionary; Evangelist

Ivan Efimovich Voronaev (born Nikita Petrovich Cherkasov; 16 April 1885) was a Russian Pentecostal pastor and missionary.

This American immigrant introduced Pentecostalism to Russia, Ukraine and some other Slavic nations. Voronaev founded the first Russian-language Pentecostal church in Manhattan in 1919.

The NKVD secret police executed Voronaev in 1937.

== Early life ==
N. P. Cherkasov entered history under the name Ivan Voronaev, which he received when obtaining a fake passport. He was born into the family of an Orenburg Cossack. After finishing school, he worked as a clerk for the village ataman. In 1907, he was called up for active duty and served in the 5th Orenburg Cossack Regiment in the town of Kazerma (Turkestan). During his service, he accidentally attended a worship service of evangelical Christians-Baptists and became a Baptist, receiving baptism in the Tashkent community of Christian Baptists.

«… If you ask me, 'Where was Christ born?' I can tell you: in the Bethlehem of my heart. And if you ask again, 'When was Christ born?' I will answer you: on August 12, 1907, the day I accepted Him by faith into my heart as my Savior."
Ivan Efimovich Voronaev. Journal "Evangelist", No. 2/1928, p. 3.»

In 1912, together with his wife, he emigrated to the United States. He graduated from a Bible college in Berkeley, California. After that, he led a Slavic Baptist church in Seattle for several years. In New York, he encountered the teachings of Pentecostals and adopted the practice of baptism of the Holy Spirit accompanied by the physical evidence of speaking in tongues (glossolalia). In 1919, he organized a Russian Pentecostal Church in New York City. In 1919, Voronaev met a newly converted and zealous Christian, Porfiry Ilchuk, Voronaev encouraged and blessed Porfiry’s desire to spread the gospel in Ukraine. Porfiry eventually returned to his homeland and became a key figure in expanding and establishing the Pentecostal movement and churches in western Ukraine.

== Missionary life in the Soviet Union ==
In 1921, together with his family, Ivan Voronaev travelled to Ukraine and settled in Odesa, where on November 12, 1921, in Sabansky Lane, he established the first Pentecostal church.

After several years, the Union of Evangelical Christian Faith (UECF) was formed, with Voronaev as its chairman. At the second All-Ukrainian Congress of the UECF held in 1926, it was reported that there were 350 churches and 17,000 believers. By this time, Pentecostal communities had emerged in almost all regions of Ukraine, as well as in central regions of Russia, the Urals, the Caucasus, and Siberia. In his (presumably last) letter to the General Council of the Assemblies of God in August 1929, Voronaev reported about 25,000 church members.

Until his arrest, Voronaev was a staff member of the General Council of the Assemblies of God.

== Arrest and death ==
In 1930, Ivan Voronaev and his like-minded associates were arrested and exiled to the Komi ASSR. In the summer of 1936, Voronaev was sent into exile in the Kaluga region. During this time, he secretly visited Odesa, where he visited the grave of his daughter Vera. In October of the same year, Voronaev was arrested again, sentenced to 5 years, and sent to a labor camp near Mariinsk. On November 2, 1937, Voronaev was sentenced to death by the NKVD. The sentence was carried out on November 5, 1937, at the camp near Mariinsk.

It was only years after his death that Voronaev's wife was able to return to the United States, where her children had previously emigrated.

A bust of Voronaev is carved on the monument "Heroes of Faith" in Odesa. On August 3, 2018, a solemn opening of a memorial plaque was held in the city of Mariinsk, Kemerovo region, dedicated to Voronaev.

== Accomplishments ==
In 1920 Ivan Voronaev traveled with Gustav Smith through Western and Southern Ukraine, where they established many new Pentecostal communities, beginning with a Pentecostal community in Odesa. Over 350 congregations in Russia, Ukraine, Poland, Bulgaria were eventually founded. In 1926, the preacher published "Short Catechesis of Christian Evangelical Faith (CEF)".
