= Hsu Tung-chih =

Executed Taiwanese serial killer

- Born: 1947; Taiwan
- Died: 14 May 1984 (aged 36–37); Tainan Prison, Tainan, Taiwan
- Cause of death: Execution by shooting
- Status: Executed
- Conviction: Murder (3 counts)
- Penalty: Death

Details
- Victims: 7–11
- Span of crimes: 1976–1983
- Country: Taiwan
- States: Taipei, Taitung
- Date apprehended: February 1983

Hsu Tung-chih (Chinese: 徐東志; 1947 – 14 May 1984) was a Taiwanese serial killer who killed at least seven people, including two girlfriends, from 1976 to 1983. Convicted, sentenced to death and subsequently executed for these killings, he is regarded as one of the worst murderers in the country's history.

== Crimes ==
=== First crime ===
Hsu's first arrest came in 1973 when he was sentenced to 3 years imprisonment for assault, but the sentence was later reduced to a year and six months in accordance with the Criminal Sentence Reduction Act of 1964. While serving his sentence, Hsu's mother entrusted one of the prison wardens, Chang Jin-shu, a distant relative, to take care of him.

=== Release and first murder ===
After he was released from prison, Hsu visited Chang and met his sister-in-law, Chang Lin-shu, and his niece, Bi-chun, who was Chang's daughter. He developed a romantic interest in the former, and the two started dating soon after.

On 29 January 1976, on the pretext of asking Bi-chun to help him repair his car, he took her from her house in Taoyuan's Guanyin District to his residence in Taipei, with Lin-shu following them soon after. After staying there for the night, Lin-shu asked Hsu for some money so she could return home to celebrate the Chinese New Year, but Hsu refused. She asked him again later that night, only for him to refuse again, prompting Bi-chun to threaten to end their relationship. In response, an angered Hsu grabbed her by the head and bashed her against the floor, killing her in the process. In an effort to cover up what he had done, he called her daughter and said that she Lin-shun returned to Taoyuan. On the next day, Hsu wrapped her body in a quilt and canvas and drove in his neighbour's van to a bamboo forest near Taichung, where he dumped her body near his brother-in-law's workplace.

=== Double murder ===
In 1977, Hsu met Chiang Yu-yun, a hostess who had always wanted to move to Japan, with Hsu, in an attempt to please her, lying that he could smuggle her there. She later moved in with him and his business partner, Wu Cai, with three sharing an apartment.

On 14 August 1977, Chiang and Wu were having an affair while Hsu was out of the house, but he returned suddenly and discovered them. Angered, he connected the 220-volt power line to the inside of the home and let the pair be electrocuted to death, stopping only when he smelled burnt flesh. The day after, Hsu covered up the bodies and drove them to the bamboo forest, where he dumped them near Chang's body.

Eventually, police investigating the three disappearances noticed that they were all related to Hsu, so they brought him in for questioning. He denied having anything to do with the killings, claiming the trio had gone to Japan to shoot an adult film. Since there was no evidence to prove that he was involved in any way, the police released him.

=== Quadruple murder ===
On 4 January 1983, Hsu fabricated a story about a supposed Japanese treasure hidden in Taimali, containing more than 300 kilograms of gold. He then told four gold prospectors from Kaohsiung (Lin Chin-shou; Wu Chun-rong or Jun-Rong; Kuo Liang and Kuo Lien-cheng) that they could accompany him in the treasure hunt, in exchange for a fee. He then drove the four men to the mountains near Taimali and let them dig, while he drove back and returned with a barrel, claiming it could be used to store the gold and keep it hidden from the police.

At one point, Hsu suddenly shouted that the police were coming and let the four prospectors hide inside the barrel, which he then filled with a large quantity of gas and poisoned them to death. He then rolled the barrel down the mountain and buried them in a vacant lot in Guanmiao.

== Investigation and arrest ==
In February 1983, Chen Yu, the wife of Wu Chun-rong, worrying that her husband had been missing for a long time, started repeatedly questioning Hsu about his well-being, but to no avail. Suspecting that he might have done something to her husband, she reported him to the police, with the authorities arresting Hsu and initiating a search for Wu. After more than a month of investigation, they located the remains of the four men and charged Hsu with four counts of murder.

During the subsequent interrogation, Hsu claimed that a member of the yakuza, Katsuo Kimura, had instructed him to kill the men and then smuggle the gold into Taitung City. The testimony was inconsistent and contradictory, making it very difficult for investigators to distinguish fact from fiction. They also investigated the supposed yakuza member story but found nothing corroborating it, which stalled the investigation for some time.

Later on, the family members of Chang, Chiang, and Wu Cai saw the news of Hsu's arrest and came forward to accuse him of killing their relatives. With these new claims, police started delving into their cases, discovering that they were also likely financially motivated. According to family members, Chiang ran the Beitou Restaurant and had millions in savings, while Wu Cai had sold some land before he disappeared, earning more than 1 million dollars in the process - due to these factors, it made no logical sense for them to travel overseas to make money.

After a long-term investigation by the police, the decomposing bodies of the three victims were finally located. Soon after the discovery, Hsu was subjected to 10 hours of questioning by the investigators, with him eventually confessing to all of the murders. According to his own confessions, his primary motive was money, but another factor that led him to kill Chiang and Wu Cai was due to their affair.

== Trial, sentence and execution ==
After confirming the seven victims and concluding the investigation, Hsu was charged with three of the murders by the Kaohsiung District Prosecutor's Office. The trial lasted until 26 March 1984, when he was found guilty and sentenced to death. He submitted an appeal to the Supreme Court, but it was rejected and the lower court's verdict was upheld, with his execution date set for 14 May.

On the aforementioned date, Hsu requested a toast to all the victims before his execution: however, he said that 9 wine glasses should be placed, two more than the known victims. Prosecutors were quite puzzled at this move, as it implied there were victims they did not know about, but as the execution order had already been signed, it was difficult to investigate the matter. A theory suggested that this was simply a ploy to delay the execution, but it could not be confirmed with certainty. As a result, Hsu was summarily executed in Tainan Prison.

== See also ==
- List of serial killers by country

== Bibliography ==
- 臺灣法曆. 一-六月 : 法律歷史上的今天 / Tai wan fa li. yi-liu yue : fa lu li shi shang de jin tian [Taiwan Calendar. Jan-June: Today in Legal History] (in Chinese). Taiwan Commercial Press Co., Ltd. January 2020. ISBN 9789570532456.
