= Hester Rebecca Nepping =

Dutch poisoner and serial killer

- Born: 9 October 1774; Amsterdam, Dutch Republic
- Died: 15 June 1812 (aged 37); Amsterdam, Netherlands
- Cause of death: Guillotined
- Conviction: Murder x2
- Penalty: Death

Details
- Victims: 3
- Span of crimes: August 1811 – November 1811
- Country: Netherlands
- State: North Holland
- Date apprehended: 1811

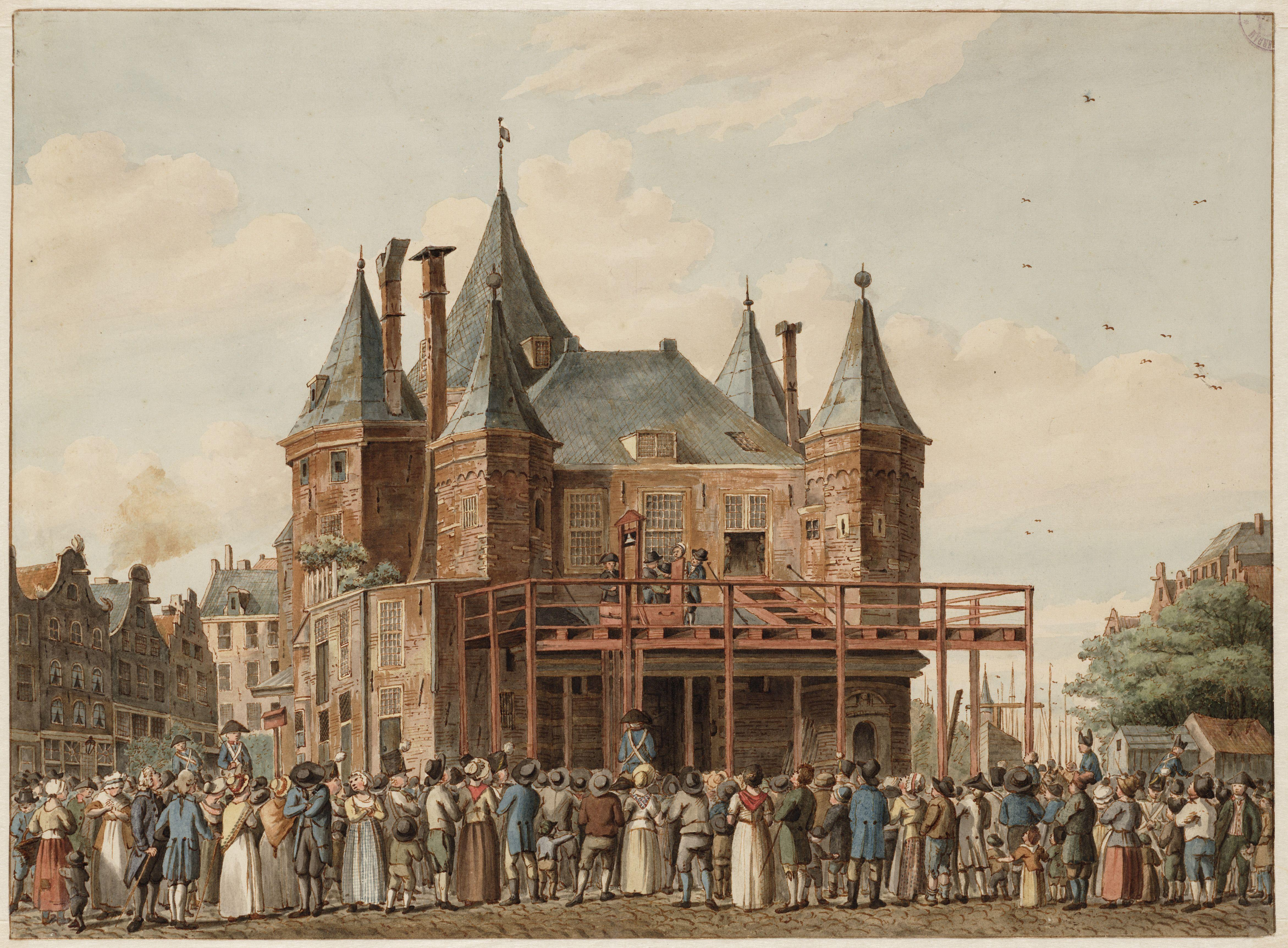
The execution of Nepping and her accomplices Adriana van Rijswijk and Gerrit Verkerk in front of the Nieuwmarkt in Amsterdam, 1812 (print by Gerrit Hulseboom)

Hester Rebecca Nepping (baptized 9 October 1774 – 15 June 1812) was a Dutch serial killer and poisoner who was guillotined in 1812.

== Biography ==
Nepping was born in Amsterdam in 1774, the only child of master painter Johannes Nepping and Cornelia Schram. At the age of 19, she married tobacco retailer Jan Brummelkamp in Amsterdam. Due to debts, they left the capital in 1800 for Loenen (present-day Hilversum), where Brummelkamp again opened a tobacco shop. After that business also failed, they moved to the village of Hall in 1805, where they both worked at a paper mill.

== Inheritance ==
In 1808, Nepping acquired a considerable inheritance, including a house in Wijk bij Duurstede and five thousand guilders in cash. The couple moved there, with Jan buying a paper dyeing shop, which again, also failed. In the meantime, Hester had an extra-marital affair with the city messenger, Gerrit Verkerk. The inheritance ran out, and the couple had to take boarders: the elderly Beerenburg-Vinjole couple and their sister-in-law. The couple paid three thousand guilders for the services, with an additional amount to be paid in case they died.

== Murders ==
Mrs. Beerenburg turned out to be a woman with a nasty attitude, and so Nepping, together with her maid Adriana van Rijswijk, planned to murder the woman. Beerenburg died on 31 August 1811. On 9 November, Hester's elderly father, who lived with her, died as well, followed two days later by her husband Jan. The deaths aroused suspicion, and the bodies were exhumed. The autopsy reports indicated that they had been poisoned with arsenic. Nepping and Van Rijswijk were arrested, as was Verkerk, who had provided the arsenic. In January 1812, they were detained in Amsterdam, where the trial was to take place. All three of them made partial confessions, and the Assizes considered two of the killings proven, handing down death sentences to all three of the accused. From 1810 onwards, because of the annexation of the Netherlands to the First French Empire, French criminal law was applied and an appeal had to be made to the court of cassation in Paris. The court upheld the verdict, and on 15 June 1812, all three were publicly guillotined in front of the Nieuwmarkt in Amsterdam. It was the only time that a death sentence was applied that way in the city's history and is often considered to be the first execution by guillotine in the Netherlands, although the guillotine had already been used in Maastricht in 1798, but Maastricht was back then an integral part of France.

== See also ==
- List of serial killers by country

== Bibliography ==
- Meddens-van Borselen, A. "The life of the poisoner Hester Rebecca Nepping (1774-1812)" in: Oud-Utrecht, jg. 71 (1998), No. 5, p. 124-129
