= Orxines =

Orxines was a Persian noble, descended from Cyrus the Great.

He was present at the Battle of Gaugamela.

He belonged to the Pasargadae.

In 323 BCE, when Alexander the Great returned to Pasargadae, Orxines presented expensive gifts to Alexander and his entourage, but deliberately ignored Alexander's lover, the Persian eunuch Bagoas. When he was told of Alexander's affection for the eunuch, Orxines replied "that he paid his respects to the king’s friends, not his whores, and that it was not the Persian custom to regard as men those who allowed themselves to be sexually used as women." As a result, Bagoas turned Alexander against Orxines, accusing him of stealing from the tomb of Cyrus the Great, and Orxines was executed.
