= Joseph Riaud =

Executed French murderer and serial killer

- Born: c. 1829; Bain-de-Bretagne, France
- Died: January 8, 1876 (aged 46–47); Rennes, France
- Cause of death: Execution by guillotine
- Conviction: Murder
- Penalty: Death

Details
- Victims: 1–3
- Span of crimes: 1860–1875
- Country: France
- State: Ille-et-Vilaine
- Date apprehended: August 3, 1875

Joseph Riaud (c. 1829 – January 8, 1876) was a French murderer and suspected serial killer who was guillotined for killing his third wife in 1875. A violent drunkard prone to violence against his wives, he was additionally suspected in the deaths of his two previous wives in 1860 and 1861, respectively.

== Early life ==
Born in about 1829 in Bain-de-Bretagne, Joseph Riaud earned a reputation in his native town as a violent, combative drunkard who ran the local butcher's shop. After getting tired of running the small business, he quit and decided to earn money by working as a day labourer, and occasionally accepting jobs to work in slaughterhouses or play the violin at weddings. Most of the time, however, he preferred to avoid doing any work, and instead begged for food and alcohol from the local townsfolk, who often indulged in his requests as to not anger him.

In 1848, he married his first wife, Marie Noël, whom he frequently beat at home to the point of leaving visible bruises, and at one time was even seen chasing her across a field using a stick with a knife attached at the end. On more than one occasion, Noël was found by neighbours with her hands tied behind her back. In 1852, Riaud was imprisoned for six days for assaulting his wife, but even after he was released, he continued to mistreat her badly. In 1860, Noël died, with the locals strongly suspecting that Riaud had killed her since the pallbearers had noticed blood running down her head when they were placing the body in the coffin. However, due to the strong fear from Riaud, nobody denounced him to the authorities. In 1861, Riaud remarried again, this time to a woman named Perrine, who also died only six weeks after their marriage. When the Bain-de-Bretagne parish priest Salmon gave the woman's last rites, he found the drunken Riaud asleep next to his deceased wife's coffin.

== Murder of Marie-Josèphe Chesnais ==
A few years after his last wife's death, unable to find a woman willing to marry him in Bain-de-Bretagne, Riaud travelled to Guèno, where he met Marie-Josèphe Chesnais, a mentally-ill mother of two. He brought her back to his town, where the couple soon married and had two children. Like with his previous marriages, Riaud began to act aggressively against his spouse, beating her on an almost regular basis. In late 1874, he was jailed for 15 days for assaulting his wife, and shortly after his release in February 1875, he was given a 3-month sentence for assaulting another resident of Bain-de-Bretagne. After his final release on June 14, Riaud's brutality towards Chesnais escalated: neighbours would frequently report hearing him beating her with a stick, and, according to one neighbour, he had even overheard Riaud instructing her to lie down on the ground and threaten to slice her throat with a knife.

On the evening of August 2, 1875, Chesnais was walking home with another man, M. Renaud, whose children she was babysitting. Seeing this from afar, Riaud ran up to his wife and started beating her, accusing her of adultery. Despite her vehement protests of innocence, Riaud refused to listen, dragging her back to the family home, where he continued beating her in front of his children until she died from her injuries. After she died, he grabbed an axe and hit her on the head seven times, shattering the skull. On the next day, Riaud wrapped up the body in a burlap sack and discarded it outside of the town, before going back and announcing that he had found his wife dead in a ditch. While Riaud claimed that the woman had died in an epileptic seizure, this claim wasn't believed and the authorities swiftly arrested him. During his subsequent interrogation, Riaud admitted to killing her without showing any remorse, but claimed that he had done so accidentally.

== Trial, sentence and death ==
At his trial in November 1875, several witnesses testified to hearing and seeing Riaud verbally threaten to kill Chesnais on numerous previous occasions. One witness, Mme. Vaillant, gave a detailed testimony to the court recollecting events that had happened, including how Riaud's first wife, Marie, often came to see her when her husband had been violent towards her. Taking into account his violent actions and remorseless behaviour, the jury found him guilty on all charges. Thus, Riaud was sentenced to death, which shocked some of the members present, but the convict himself appeared unmoved upon hearing the verdict.

Riaud's sentence was appealed to the cour d'assises, but his petition for a pardon was rejected. On January 8, 1876, Riaud was beheaded at Rennes. His last wish prior to his execution was that the authorities give 60 francs to his youngest son so that he can buy a violin when he grows up.

== See also ==
- List of French serial killers
