= Robert William Douglas Willoughby =

Sir Robert William Douglas Willoughby

Deputy Commissioner
- Monarch: George V

Personal details
- Born: 21 January 1877 Oxford, United Kingdom
- Died: 26 August 1920 (aged 43) Lakhimpur Kheri, British India
- Education: Magdalen College, Oxford

Sir Robert William Douglas Willoughby was Deputy Commissioner of Kheri. He was the son of Colonel R. F. Willoughby.

The East India Company built Willoughby Memorial Hall in 1924 in memory of Sir Robert William Douglas Willoughby, Deputy Commissioner of Kheri who was killed on 26 August 1920. The colonial authorities apprehended independence activists Naseeruddin Mauzi Nagar and Rajnarayan Mishra on charges of shooting the Deputy Commissioner, and sentenced them to death by hanging. On 26 April 1936, Willoughby Memorial Library was established. The Willoughby Memorial Hall was recently renamed the Naseeruddin Memorial Hall.
