= Manoranjan Bhattacharya (revolutionary) =

Indian anti-colonial revolutionary (1909–1932)

- মনোরঞ্জন ভট্টাচার্য
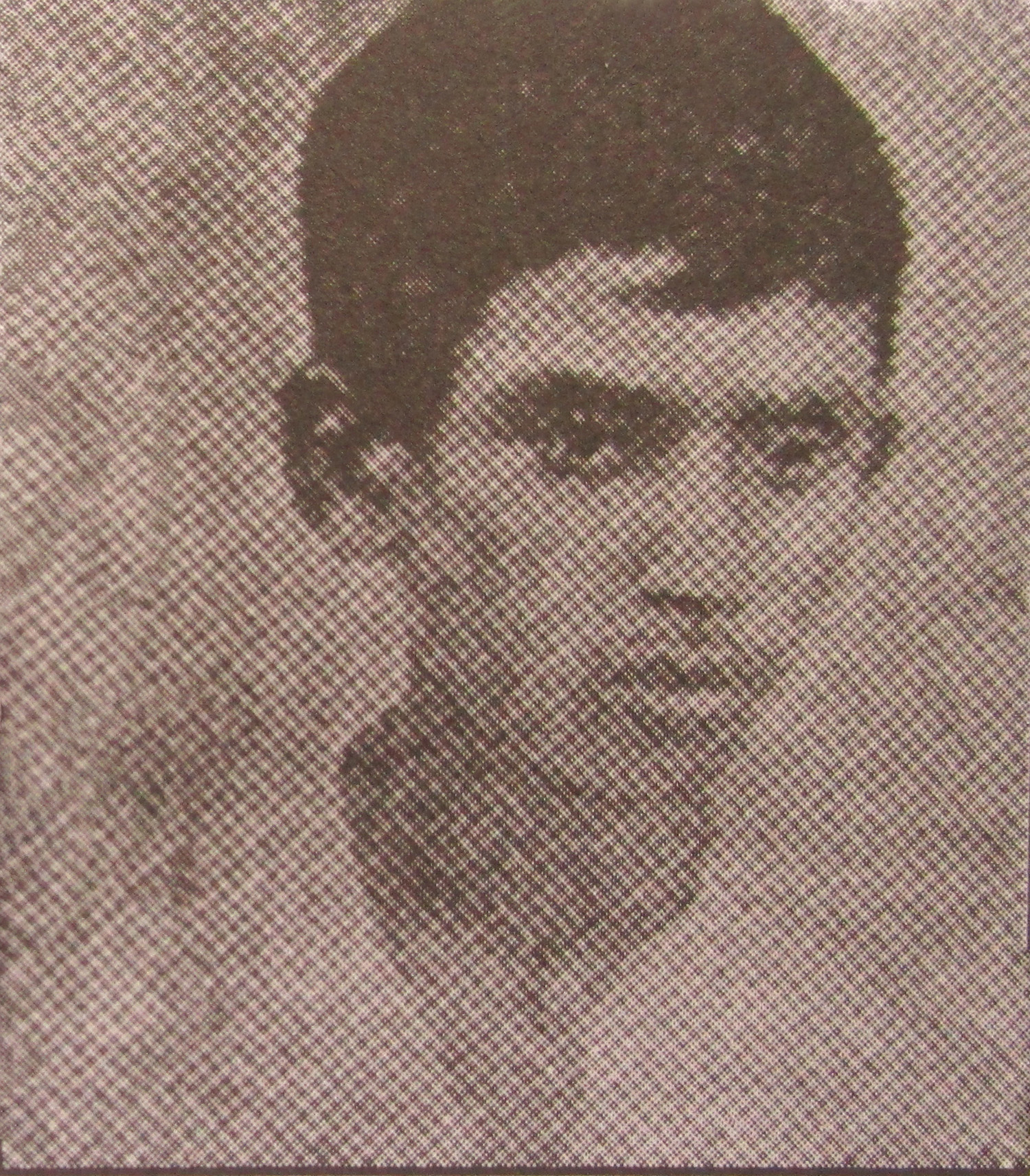
- Born: 21 July 1909; Erikati, Faridpur district, East Bengal and Assam
- Died: 22 August 1932 (aged 21–22); Barisal Central Jail, Bengal Province
- Cause of death: Execution by hanging
- Movement: Indian Independence Movement
- Spouse: Nirupama Devi
- Father: Kaliprasanna Bhattacharya

Manoranjan Bhattacharya (Bengali: মনোরঞ্জন ভট্টাচার্য; 21 July 1909 – 22 August 1932) was an Indian independence activist and Bengali revolutionary from Faridpur, East Bengal. Initially inspired by Congress-led nonviolent movements, he later joined the revolutionary underground under Purna Chandra Das of the Madaripur Group. Following Das's arrest in 1930, Manoranjan led operations, organizing swadeshi dacoities to fund anti-colonial activities.

== Early life and education ==
Manoranjan Bhattacharya was born on 21 July 1909 in Erikathi, a village in the Idilpur pargana of Faridpur district (then part of the Madaripur subdivision of British India, now Bangladesh), to Kaliprasanna Bhattacharya, in an orthodox Barendra Brahmin family. His parents enrolled him at Koneshwar High English School after his uncle, an English-educated employee of the Assam Railway Company, encouraged the family to give Bhattacharya a modern education.

== Activism ==
In 1929, Bhattacharya attended a youth conference in Gohala, Faridpur, then traveled with six associates to Madaripur to meet with fellow revolutionaries. Beyond the Erikathi Boys' Library, Bhattacharya led initiatives in public health, education, and youth mobilization.

After the 1930 arrest of revolutionary leader Purna Chandra Das, Bhattacharya assumed leadership of the Madaripur group.

=== Post office dacoity and arrest ===
After the 1930 arrest of Purna Das, Bhattacharya took over leadership of the Madaripur revolutionary group, which continued organizing protests and revolts to fund anti-colonial activities. On 14 March 1932, during an attempted mailbag robbery at the Charmugria Post Office in Madaripur, Bhattacharya scuffled with the post office manager and fired his revolver, killing two people.

Local residents captured him and his associates, and handed them over to British authorities. Bhattacharya was tried and sentenced to death. Two of the co-accused, Suren Bar and Jageshwar Das, were sentenced to transportation for life, and another, Jogesh Chatterjee, was sentenced to imprisonment for ten years. On 22 August 1932, Bhattacharya was executed by hanging in Barisal District Jail. His execution occurred during a wave of revolts inspired by the Chittagong Armoury Raid.
