= Naseeruddin Mauzi =

Khilafat movement activist from India

Naseeruddin Mauzi Nagar
- Born: Lakhimpur Kheri, British India
- Movement: Khilafat Movement

Naseeruddin Mauzi Nagar was an Indian Khilafat Movement activist. He was one of three Khilafat Movement activists hanged by the colonial authorities for the killing of Sir Robert William Douglas Willoughby, Deputy Commissioner of Kheri, on 26 August 1920.

The East India Company built Willoughby Memorial Hall in 1924 in memory of Robert William Douglas Willoughby. On 26 April 1936, Willoughby Memorial Library was established. The Willoughby Memorial Hall was recently renamed the Naseeruddin Memorial Hall.
