= Manoranjan Bhattacharya (writer) =

- মনোরঞ্জন ভট্টাচার্য
- Born: 1903; Faridpur, Bengal Presidency, British India
- Died: 1939 (aged 35–36); Calcutta, British India
- Education: Presidency College, Calcutta

Manoranjan Bhattacharya (1903–1939 in Faridpur), wrote Bengali children's literature.

== Early life ==
Manoranjan studied in Hindu School & Presidency College, Calcutta. He earned a first-class first in Economics and Political Science followed by an M.A. & B.L. Degree. He served as a professor at Ripon College, Calcutta.

== Literary works ==
Manoranjan was a very special student from his very early childhood. He mastered Sanskrit Panini Grammar at an early age at his village School at Faridpur (now in Bangladesh) learning on his own. The Sanskrit College, Calcutta, in those days, used to hold Debate Competition on different subjects, depending on age and study-levels from Schools and Colleges boys. The main condition of the competition was that the students will have to speak strictly in Sanskrit only. The lowest category was "All Bengal Class-X" . While studying in Class VIII Manoranjan had a strong desire to join this debate competition at All Bengal Class-X level. He approached the Head Master of his School (Krishnanagar Collegiate School) to nominate his name as a competitor. The head Master was very much doubtful looking at Manoranjan's age. But after long persuasion, Manoranjan managed to get an approval and an invitation from the Sanskrit College authority to take part in the competition, finally winning it.

As a student, Manoranjan contributed poems to various magazines. He switched to literature for youngsters after Ramdhanu was born (1928).

His father, District Magistrate Bishweshwar Bhattacharya, founded the teen periodical, Ramdhanu ('The Rainbow'). For eight years until his untimely demise, he took over editorship from Bishweshwar. His teen detective fiction, starring the Japanese sleuth Hukakasi, deviated from the prevalent sensational, melodramatic style, and was admired by the likes of Premendra Mitra and Satyajit Ray.

Manoranjan filled the pages of Ramdhanu with school stories, humorous tales, poems and informative articles. He penned a series of humorous pseudo-mythological sketches, later labelled Nutan Puraan. Other story anthologies include Chaayer Dhnowaa, Haashyo O Rahashyo, Apriloshyo Prothom Dibawshey (co-authored with Shibram Chakraborty). His major works, including three Hukakashi novels and five short stories, a translation of The Channings were anthologized in Manoranjan Bhattacharya's Chhotoder Omnibus.

Author and younger brother Kshitindranarayan followed him as editor of Ramdhanu.
