= John Golden (pirate) =

John Golden (Note: Last name occasionally spelled Golden, Ooldin, or Golding. He was tried alongside fellow crewman John Gold, with whom he should not be confused.) (c.1646-1694) was a Jacobite pirate and privateer active in the waters near England and France. His trial was important in establishing Admiralty law, differentiating between privateers and pirates, and ending the naval ambitions of the deposed James II.

== Biography ==
John Golden was born in Dublin circa 1646, he was the nephew of James Walsh, a Jacobite and Captain in the French navy. The Walsh family would go on to become prominent members of the French nobility. Golden moved with his Uncle to Port Louis, France, when he was 10 years old as the Walsh family had been expelled from Ireland for siding with the Irish Catholic Confederation in the Wars of the Three Kingdoms.

The Catholic King James II was deposed in late 1688 in favour of Protestant rulers William and Mary in the Glorious Revolution. Retreating to France, he issued privateering commissions in concert with France's King Louis XIV to aid in harassing English forces at sea. Golden used one such commission with his ship Sun Privateer to capture the English frigate James Galley in late 1692. En route to France they were recaptured by the English vessel Prince of Orange, then taken to England and imprisoned in the Marshalsea Prison to await trial.

Golden argued that his French privateering commission via James II was still valid, and that as such he should be treated as a prisoner of war and not tried as a pirate. He and his crew also quoted the Treaty of Limerick, which allowed English subjects to serve foreign rulers militarily. The King's Admiralty Advocate William Oldys (Note: Also Oldiss or Oldish; he was the father of bibliographer and antiquarian William Oldys.) agreed and refused to prosecute them for piracy. Other officials disagreed and removed Oldys, replacing him with Fisher Littleton, who agreed to prosecute some of the prisoners as pirates but tried Golden and a few supporters for treason instead. Matthew Tindall, who later wrote about the case, supported Littleton's position. Littleton argued that a deposed ruler had no authority to commission privateers and therefore Golden and his crew had no protections under law. The Treaty of Limerick forbade English subjects from serving against England and the Court rejected it as a defence.

Convicted of treason for making war against William and Mary in the name of a foreign ruler, Golden and two others appealed to the court, arguing that being deposed did not deprive James II of his authority as King and laid out several arguments supporting their claim to be treated as prisoners of war. The Court rejected their Jacobite arguments: "through Ignorance, as supposing the Commission he acted under sufficient to warrant his Illegal Proceedings; the Jury being directed by the Court as to matter of Fact, he was found Guilty of High-Treason". In March 1694 they were hanged, drawn, and quartered. Six others were convicted of piracy and were hanged, while a further four (Note: Two of the men accused of piracy were named Richard Shivers and Dennis Cockram, who should not be confused with unrelated pirates Richard (Dirk) Chivers or John Cockram.) were acquitted and released. Within two years James II ceased offering privateering commissions.

== See also ==
- Jean Baptiste Guedry, An Acadian whose trial for piracy was used to teach locals as an example of English admiralty law.
- Matthew Tindal
