= Władysław Mazurkiewicz (serial killer) =

Polish serial killer

- Mazurkiewicz before trials
- Born: 31 January 1911; Kraków, Poland
- Died: 29 January 1957 (aged 45); Montelupich Prison, Polish People's Republic
- Occupation: Entrepreneur
- Status: Executed by hanging
- Conviction: Murder (6 counts)
- Penalty: Death

Details
- Victims: 6–30

Władysław Mazurkiewicz (31 January 1911 – 29 January 1957) was a Polish serial killer from the post–World War II Kraków. He also owned property in Warsaw. His economic standing and polite manners in Stalinist Poland earned him the nickname "The Gentleman Murderer" (elegancki morderca), as well as "Piękny Władek" (the handsome Władek).

Mazurkiewicz was arrested in 1955 and charged by the prosecution with six murders and two more attempted murders. He was convicted of killing four men and two women: Wiktor Zarzecki, Władysław Brylski, Józef Tomaszewski, and millionaire Jerzy de Laveaux along with his wife Jadwiga de Laveaux and her sister, Zofia Suchowa. He was tried by the regional court in Kraków and sentenced to death on 30 August 1956. He was executed by hanging five months later on 29 January 1957, two days before his 46th birthday. According to various rumours, Mazurkiewicz might have been responsible for as many as 30 murders, which were never confirmed. However, he himself pleaded not guilty, and claimed in court to have been beaten and blackmailed during interrogations.

== Life ==
His mother died when he was 3 years old. He grew up with his father, a printer by profession. After graduation in the newly reborn Poland, Mazurkiewicz enrolled in the department of law at Jagiellonian University but dropped out. He was drafted during the September campaign. According to his own testimony, during the Nazi German occupation of Kraków, Mazurkiewicz made friends with the human resources chief of the local Gestapo, Rudolf Arnold, who issued him the Kennkarte of a Gestapo friseur which allowed him freedom of movement. He made a living by trading gold, money and diamonds illegally. His first known murder victim was a fellow gambler Wiktor Zarzecki, whom he poisoned with tainted tea in December 1943 and stripped of 1,200 dollars. After the war, Mazurkiewicz obtained a position with the Polish Red Cross, and worked as a wine seller and driving instructor. In September 1955, he shot and wounded Stanisław Łopuszyński in Warsaw. His victim survived and contacted the police which led to his arrest and grand-scale investigation into his own crimes. His revolver was found, and he was recognized by the surviving victims. Nevertheless, Mazurkiewicz claimed in court to have signed an admission of guilt under torture.

== See also ==
- List of serial killers by country
- List of serial killers by number of victims
