= Capital punishment in Hong Kong =

Capital punishment in Hong Kong was formally abolished on 23 April 1993 by virtue of the Crimes (Amendment) Ordinance 1993. Before then, capital punishment was the usual sentence given since the establishment of the Crown Colony of Hong Kong for offences such as murder, kidnapping ending in death, and piracy.

The last execution in Hong Kong was carried out on 16 November 1966 when Wong Kai-kei (Chinese: 黃啟基), aged 25, was hanged at Stanley Prison. Wong was a Chinese-Vietnamese who, on 3 July 1966, was burgling the Chung Keen Company building in Sham Shui Po when he was spotted by security guard Chan Fat-sang (Chinese: 陳佛生). Wong killed Chan and injured a woman in the subsequent fight, and was found guilty of murder and sentenced to execution by hanging. After his conviction, Wong attempted to appeal the sentence, claiming that he had confessed under duress, and also wrote to the Governor of Hong Kong David Trench, seeking clemency. Reform Club chairman Brook Bernacchi published an open letter against the sentencing, claiming that Hong Kong, as a British colony, should not retain the death penalty when Great Britain had suspended (later abolishing) the death sentence for murder in the previous year, 1965.

Following Wong's execution, the death penalty was suspended. The Governor of Hong Kong would as a matter of course commute the sentences of those convicted under the death penalty to life imprisonment under the Royal prerogative of mercy. In April 1993, capital punishment was officially abolished in Hong Kong. Since then, life imprisonment has been the most severe punishment in Hong Kong.

Under the principle of independence of legal system in the Hong Kong Basic Law, Hong Kong has continued its repudiation of capital punishment after its handover to the People's Republic of China despite capital punishment still being regularly carried out in mainland China.

Even after the abolition of the death penalty in Hong Kong, there were still cases of Hongkongers sentenced to death in other countries, notably serial killer Charles Ng in California, United States, and several Hong Kong-born drug traffickers in Singapore, including Elke Tsang Kai-mong, Tong Ching-man, and Poon Yuen-chung.

== See also ==
- Human rights in Hong Kong
- Capital punishment in Macau
- Capital punishment in China
- Capital punishment in Taiwan
- Capital punishment in the United Kingdom
