= Daniel Chan Chi-pun =

Hongkonger and drug trafficker who was executed in Singapore

- 1990 police mugshot of Daniel Chan Chi-pun
- Born: Daniel Chan Chi-pun; 1 January 1957; British Hong Kong
- Died: 10 March 1995 (aged 38); Changi Prison, Singapore
- Cause of death: Execution by hanging
- Other name: Chan Chi Bun
- Occupations: Diamond-cutter (former); Security guard (former)
- Spouse: Chan Sok Lim
- Children: One unnamed step-son Chan Sai-wang (son)
- Parent(s): Chan Wing-kee (father); Unnamed mother
- Status: Executed
- Conviction: Drug trafficking (one count)
- Criminal charges: Trafficking of 464 grams of heroin
- Penalty: Death penalty

Daniel Chan Chi-pun (陳誌文/陈志文; 1 January 1957 – 10 March 1995) was a Hongkonger charged with trafficking 464 grams of heroin on 20 November 1990. Chan was said to have smuggled the drugs in return for money to pay for the treatment to cure his son's blindness. Chan, however, denied knowing that he was carrying heroin and even claimed it was someone else who passed the vest to him at the airport before he was arrested.

Subsequently, Chan's defences were not accepted, and he was sentenced to death on 8 May 1993 for heroin trafficking, and he lost his appeal in February of the following year. Chan was initially scheduled to hang on 25 November 1994, but he obtained a stay of execution after requesting for more time to make a personal petition for clemency. In spite of the international pleas from human rights groups and the British Hong Kong government to spare Chan's life, clemency was ultimately denied by the Singapore government, and Chan was hanged at the age of 38 on 10 March 1995.

== Background ==
Born in British Hong Kong in 1957, Daniel Chan Chi-pun was the only son of his family, who were Christians. His father worked as a school principal, and Chan himself worked as a diamond-cutter and security guard after reaching adulthood and completing his schooling.

During his adulthood, Chan married a woman named Chan Sok Lim, and together, they had a son, who was born blind. From her first marriage to an unnamed male, Chan's wife had one son, who became Chan's step-son after he married the boy's mother. According to Chan's wife, Chan was a loving and caring husband, and also a good father to his son, and also loved his step-son just as much.

== Drug trafficking charge ==
While in Hong Kong, Daniel Chan was approached by a colleague from his workplace, who assured him there was a way to earn 'pennies from heaven' to seek treatment for his blind son, which was to import drugs. The colleague additionally claimed that there were good doctors abroad who would help the little boy to recover his eyesight. Although Chan did not agree to the colleague's offer to traffic drugs initially, he later conceded and agreed after much persuasion.

Per the pre-planned offer, Chan would go to Toronto, Canada from Phuket, Thailand via transit to Singapore to deliver some drugs, in return for HK$80,000. Chan was given a vest, which he was caught wearing when he arrived in Singapore at Changi Airport on 20 November 1990. The customs officers searched Chan after noticing his suspicious behaviour, and they found 16 packets of heroin strapped to his vest. The total amount of heroin in the packages weighed 464 grams, which was nearly 31 times the minimum amount of 15g, which mandated the death sentence under the Misuse of Drugs Act in Singapore. The drugs themselves had a market worth of S$1.6 million. Chan was formally charged with drug trafficking on 21 November 1990.

It was reported that soon after the arrest of her only son, Chan's mother committed suicide by hanging herself. Although the exact cause of death was not relayed to Chan, Chan was nonetheless devastated to hear about his mother's death.

== Death penalty trial ==
Chan stood trial on 28 April 1993. His lawyer was Spencer Gwee, a former prosecutor who turned to private practice. Both Lee Sing Lit and Leong Wing Tuck were assigned to prosecute Chan for drug trafficking, and the trial judge was Judicial Commissioner Kan Ting Chiu.

Initially, in his police statements, Chan admitted that he was told to import heroin into Canada from Thailand for a payment of HK$80,000. In court however, Chan stated that he was unaware of the heroin in his possession. Chan claimed that the vest did not belong to him, because it was given to him by a stranger when he first arrived in Singapore, and he wore it after the man requested him to do so, and it happened that the vest itself was strapped with these packages without his notice. The claims Chan made in court formed the main lines of his defence.

After a seven-day trial, on 8 May 1993, Judicial Commissioner Kan Ting Chiu delivered his verdict. JC Kan found that per his first statements to the police before he changed his story, Chan knew that he was carrying heroin and did so with the intent to traffic them to Toronto via transit to SIngapore for a payment of HK$80,000. It was also unbelievable and suspicious for Chan to comply with a mere stranger's instruction and request to wear a vest, and the judge accepted the prosecution's case that Chan indeed brought these drugs personally into Singapore, which disputed Chan's defence that he was ignorant of the drugs he carried, given that Chan came to possess the vest under suspicious circumstances and should Chan be truly ignorant of the drugs inside the vest, he had the chance to question the man, which he did not do so.

As such, 36-year-old Chan was found guilty of heroin trafficking, and he was sentenced to death by hanging. Nine months after he was sentenced to death, Chan's appeal against his sentence was dismissed by the Court of Appeal on 14 February 1994.

In the year 1993 when Chan was received the death penalty, a total of 49 people, including Chan himself, were sentenced to execution for drug trafficking in Singapore between January and November 1993. By November 1994, Chan was one of the five Hongkongers incarcerated on Singapore's death row while awaiting their executions. Aside from Chan, the four others - Elke Tsang Kai-mong, Poon Yuen-chung, Lam Cheuk-wang and Tong Ching-man - had also lost their appeals and were at risk of imminent execution by the time Chan himself was scheduled to hang in that same month. In spite of her Portuguese citizenship, Macau-born Angel Mou Pui Peng, was the sixth from Hong Kong to be pending execution in Singapore for drug smuggling.

== Death warrant and appeal ==
While he was on death row at Changi Prison, Daniel Chan, who lost his appeal, did not file for clemency despite his lawyer Spencer Gwee's advice, due to him feeling that such a move would damage his claims of innocence over the offence he was convicted of. Nevertheless, Gwee drafted a petition for clemency and submitted it in May 1994 on Chan's behalf, in hopes of obtaining a reprieve and commuting his client's death sentence to life imprisonment. However, on 18 November 1994, the clemency appeal was rejected by then President of Singapore Ong Teng Cheong. Soon after, a death warrant was made and the prison authorities informed Chan's family that Chan was scheduled to be executed a week later on 25 November 1994. Both the British High Commission and Amnesty International appealed for clemency upon being given notice of the death warrant.

Chan was described to be a devout Christian, and a volunteer noted that Chan was resigned to his fate, as he was able to cope with the help of religion. Chan was noticeably reformed and he showed regret and repentance for his crime, and often expressed concern to his family and fellow prisoners. His wife blamed herself for her husband's plight, given that Chan committed the crime for money to pay for his son's medical fees. When his family went to visit him one final time, Chan decided to change his mind after seeing his elderly father, wife and six-year-old son, feeling that he owed them and thus he appealed for a stay of execution to allow him more time to prepare a second clemency plea.

Nine hours before he was to be hanged, Chan received a notification on the night of 24 November 1994 that he would not be hanged the next morning, and instead, he was given a period of two weeks to prepare his personal letter for clemency while his execution was indefinitely suspended. On that morning of 25 November 1994, the same day when Chan was to hang as originally scheduled, two death row prisoners were put to death; one of them was Ong Yeow Tian, who killed a police officer and even shot two other cops (who both survived). Ong was Chan's acquaintance and cellmate while on death row, and Chan was the one who preached his Christian beliefs to Ong and baptized him prior to Ong's execution.

After his temporary reprieve, Chan therefore filed a personal plea for clemency, in which he pleaded for his life to be spared, recounting that he felt deep regret for his crime and hoped to have a second chance in life. The appeal was heard on 8 December 1994. During the time Chan was still pending his clemency outcome, two Hong Kong residents Elke Tsang and Angel Mou were hanged on 16 December 1994 and 6 January 1995 respectively, leaving Chan and three others from Hong Kong to remain on Singapore's death row, with their sentences pending to be carried out.

During the time Chan was appealing for clemency, an eye expert, Dennis Lam Shun-chiu, was consulted to examine Chan's son, and he found that the young boy would not be able to recover his eyesight. In fact, the child had a cornea transplant in one eye a few years prior to his father's execution, but the surgery was unsuccessful.

== Execution ==
On 23 February 1995, it was reported that on the advice of the Cabinet, then President Ong Teng Cheong decided to dismiss Daniel Chan's clemency appeal. Therefore, Chan failed his final bid to escape the gallows, and a second death warrant was finalized soon after, rescheduling Chan's execution to take place on 10 March 1995. Chris Patten, then Governor of British Hong Kong before its handover, tried to appeal to the Singaporean government to pardon Chan during his two-day visit in the country in March 1995, but it was declined.

On 10 March 1995, 38-year-old Chan was hanged at dawn in Changi Prison. Chan was the 99th person to be put to death within Singapore's jurisdiction, after the death penalty was first introduced twenty years prior in 1975 for drug trafficking under the Misuse of Drugs Act. A funeral was later conducted for Chan after he was executed. He was remembered as a good father and son by his family members and friends present at the funeral.

A month after Chan was executed, the remaining three Hongkongers - Lam Cheuk-wang, Tong Ching-man and Poon Yuen-chung - were all hanged in Changi Prison on 21 April 1995, therefore becoming the last three people from Hong Kong to be executed in Singapore since then. In total, 15 Hong Kong people have been executed in Singapore since 1989.

== See also ==
- Capital punishment in Singapore
