= Execution of Elke Tsang Kai-mong =

Hong Kong drug trafficker (1964–1994)

Elke Tsang Kai-mong
- Elke Tsang Kai-mong's mugshot
- Born: Elke Tsang Kai-mong; 5 April 1964; British Hong Kong
- Died: 16 December 1994 (aged 30); Changi Prison, Singapore
- Cause of death: Execution by hanging
- Occupation: Merchandiser (former)
- Partner: "Ah Lam"
- Parent: Tsang Nim-tong (father)
- Status: Executed
- Conviction: Drug trafficking (one count)
- Criminal charge: Trafficking of 4.1307kg of diamorphine
- Penalty: Death penalty

Elke Tsang Kai-mong (simplified Chinese: 张凯梦; traditional Chinese: 張凱夢; pinyin: Zhāng Kǎimèng; Wade–Giles: Chang^{1} K'ai^{3}-meng^{4}) was a 30-year-old female Hongkonger who was executed in Singapore after being charged with and found guilty of smuggling over 4 kg of diamorphine into the country. Tsang, the daughter of a high-ranking Hong Kong police officer, was caught on 26 July 1992 at Changi Airport with 22 packets of diamorphine stuffed in the lining of her two jackets. Despite putting up a defence that she had committed the crime out of fear for her life, Tsang was found guilty of capital drug trafficking after a six-day trial and sentenced to death on 19 October 1993. She was one of the few women from Hong Kong (including Angel Mou Pui Peng, Cheuk Mei Mei, Tong Ching Man and Poon Yuen Chung) who faced the gallows for drug offences in Singapore in the 1990s. Tsang was hanged on 16 December 1994 after losing her appeal.

== Background ==
Elke Tsang Kai-mong was born to an affluent family living in British Hong Kong, and, during adulthood, she resided in Hunghom. Tsang was the second of four children and had one older brother, one younger sister, and one younger brother. Tsang's father was Hong Kong West Auxiliary Police Senior Superintendent Tsang Nim-tong. Her parents were highly educated and graduated from university.

Tsang and her siblings were sent to school to complete higher education. Her older brother worked as an interior designer, her sister as a secretary, and her younger brother was sent to study in Britain. In contrast to her siblings, however, Tsang did not complete secondary school, and instead worked as a merchandiser. At the time of her arrest in Singapore, Tsang was unemployed due to the bankruptcy of her company, and was engaged to a man whom she first met at a 1985 Hong Kong disco.

== Arrest at Changi Airport ==
Singapore Customs officer reenacting how packets of heroin were discovered hidden inside the inner lining of two winter jackets in possession of Elke Tsang

On 26 July 1992, at Singapore's Changi Airport, 28-year-old Elke Tsang Kai-mong was arrested by airport police for drug trafficking. At about 3:10pm, Customs officer Rosli Brahim observed Tsang at baggage conveyor belt 18 in the arrival hall of Terminal 1 and became suspicious of her behaviour. Tsang was stopped by Rosli for a customs check when she tried to exit via the Green Channel. He searched her possessions and sensed that a jacket at the bottom of her bag felt unusual to the touch, so ordered Tsang to follow him to the customs office for a more thorough inspection.

After removing two winter jackets from Tsang's luggage, the officers found both to be unusually heavy and seemed to have something behind hand-sewn stitches at the bottom edge of each. Officer Rosli then cut open each jacket and found a total of 22 packets of heroin stuffed inside their inner lining. The total amount of diamorphine weighed 4.1307 kg, which was 275.38 times the minimum amount (which is 15g) that mandated the death sentence under the Misuse of Drugs Act of Singapore if found guilty. When questioned at the scene, Tsang claimed not to know what was inside the jackets, that they were given to her by a man in Bangkok and that she was traveling onto Australia to meet her boyfriend.

The investigations of Tsang's case was originally led by Inspector Rajab Mohamed, who arrived at the airport at about 6:20pm, but it was later taken over by S. Gopalan Krishnan after Inspector Rajab was murdered in 1993. Tsang was thereafter charged with trafficking diamorphine and remanded in custody to await trial. Tsang's case was regarded as the largest drug haul case encountered by the Central Narcotics Bureau, Singapore's narcotics police division, in that year itself.

== Trial ==
On 11 October 1993, a year and three months after her arrest, Elke Tsang was brought to trial at the High Court before Judicial Commissioner M P H Rubin. Tsang was represented by lawyers Shireena Woon and Alan Wong during her trial, while Ong Hian Sun was appointed as the trial prosecutor.

In her defence, Tsang claimed that she was intimidated into delivering the drugs from Bangkok to her original destination in Europe through transit to Singapore. She recounted that she travelled from Hong Kong to Bangkok to look for a male friend named "Ah Jim", who borrowed HK$30,000 from her. She claimed to have first met Ah Jim at the Hot Gossip Disco on Canton Road a couple of years before her arrest. After she arrived at Thailand and met Ah Jim at Bangkok, Ah Jim confiscated her passport and asked her to deliver two to three packets of hashish (or marijuana) to Amsterdam via Sweden, having first transited through Singapore. Aside from this, it was also a hanging offence by Singapore law standards to import 500g of hashish or more. Tsang claimed she was told that on delivery she would receive HK$110,000 and was to return to Hong Kong with the money, where she reimbursed the original HK$30,000 along with an additional HK$10,000 as a reward. Tsang was also allegedly given US$3,000 in cash for travel expenses, with the intention she would stay in Singapore for one night and then purchase a ticket from SAS Airlines for onward travel to Sweden the next day.

The packets of heroin Elke Tsang was charged with importing

Due to the intimidation and threats by Ah Jim, Tsang had no choice but to accept the offer, and she received the two winter jackets from another man the next day, and that same man also packed up her jackets and luggage and kept them until she checked in at the airport. According to Tsang, when she was safely on board the plane she decided to return to Hong Kong from Singapore instead of travelling onwards to Europe, as the US$3,000 she had received was equivalent to HK$21,000 and amounted to a substantial part of the original loan. Tsang also thought that if she was caught with the hashish on arrival in Hong Kong she would probably not face arrest.

Tsang's defence counsel argued that Tsang had no chance to check her baggage and was unaware she was carrying diamorphine while believing she had hashish in her possession, and should not be held fully culpable for drug trafficking since she did it against her will and out of safety for her life. It was revealed during Tsang's trial that Ah Jim was arrested in Russia's capital city Moscow for drug offences in August 1992 and was incarcerated in a Russian prison at Moscow for these charges.

However, the prosecution rebutted that Tsang was aware that she was carrying diamorphine. They pointed out that should Tsang was truly innocent and genuinely did not know she carried diamorphine, she would have, at the earliest opportunity, raised doubts about her knowledge of the presence of diamorphine in her baggage. Even if it was true that Tsang had her passport confiscated or being in a helpless position due to the threats to her safety, she could simply choose to report the loss of her passport and told the authorities of her plight, or even sought help from the airport officials once she was out of the grip of these people who supposedly showed aggression on her.

== Verdict ==
On 19 October 1993, after a trial lasting six days, Judicial Commissioner M P H Rubin delivered his verdict.

In his judgement, JC Rubin found that the prosecution had successfully proven its case against Elke Tsang beyond a reasonable doubt, and rejected Tsang's defence that she did not know that she was carrying diamorphine and was misguided into thinking she was to deliver hashish. JC Rubin also rejected Tsang's defence that she was forced and threatened by her accomplices to import the drugs from Europe through Singapore, and he accepted the prosecution's arguments about her inconsistent details of how she committed the crime and determined that Tsang had these 22 packages of diamorphine in her possession for the purpose of trafficking. The court likewise dismissed her claims of being forced to travel to Sweden and assertion of instead planning to return to Hong Kong immediately, highlighting how she was caught in possession of a return plane ticket to Bangkok and had written in her disembarkation card that she would stay in Singapore for 4 days.

As such, 29-year-old Elke Tsang Kai-mong was found guilty of diamorphine trafficking and sentenced to death. Tsang was reportedly emotionless at the verdict of death, and none of her family members were present in Singapore or the court to hear her trial outcome.

Tsang later appealed her death sentence and drug conviction, but the Court of Appeal rejected her appeal and affirmed her sentence on 26 January 1994.

In the year 1993 when Elke Tsang was sentenced to hang, a total of 49 people, including Tsang herself, were given the death penalty for drug trafficking in Singapore between January and November 1993.

== Death warrant and final appeal ==
In December 1994, Elke Tsang's family was notified that her execution would take place at Changi Prison on 16 December 1994.

During the final days on death row at Changi Prison, Tsang's boyfriend and fiancé, who wanted to known only as "Ah Lam", unfailingly wrote letters to his fiancée and even travelled to Singapore to visit Tsang in prison one final time. He noted that Tsang was emotional and despondent over her imminent fate, and the fact that her family moved away from their Yuen Long home and cut off contact with her after her arrest. Tsang reportedly promised Ah Lam that she would return to Hong Kong after her release to marry him if by chance, her clemency plea was successful and her death sentence commuted to life imprisonment. After receiving Tsang's death warrant, Tsang's parents and family members came to Singapore to visit Tsang one last time at Changi Prison. Reportedly, Tsang was emotional at the reunion of her family, and she was noticeably depressed and hysterical during her final days before her scheduled hanging.

At that time, Singapore was facing international calls to not execute Macau-born Hong Kong resident Angel Mou Pui Peng (who had Portuguese citizenship), who was at risk of imminent execution for drug trafficking, although much of the attention was focused on Mou and not being directed at Tsang's case, given that Tsang's father was not willing to use his position to publicise his daughter's case and seek a reprieve for Tsang. Nevertheless, Tsang's father still requested for clemency for his eldest daughter, and Amnesty International also seek to appeal to the Singapore Government to spare the lives of Elke Tsang and Angel Mou, and it was not accepted.

On the eve of Tsang's execution, her lawyers tried to apply for her execution to be delayed until after Lunar New Year for her, in order to allow Tsang's father to fully recover from a kidney condition and the family to spend more time with Tsang, who reportedly wanted to donate her kidneys to her father. However, the application was rejected by then President of Singapore Ong Teng Cheong, who earlier declined to grant clemency in Tsang's case.

A Buddhist nun, who counselled Tsang during her final days before her execution, told the Hong Kong newspaper South China Morning Post (SCMP) that Tsang accepted her fate and gradually became prepared to head to the gallows for her offence.

== Execution ==
On the Friday morning of 16 December 1994, 30-year-old Elke Tsang Kai-mong was officially hanged at Changi Prison, therefore becoming the second female Hong Kong resident to be hanged in Singapore, after Cheuk Mei Mei who was executed nine months earlier on 4 March 1994. On the same morning, two Thai drug traffickers Vinit Sopon and Pairoj Bunsom were also executed at the same prison as Tsang. Initially, in that same month of Tsang's execution, another Hong Kong resident Angel Mou Pui Peng was also scheduled to hang the following Friday (23 December) after Tsang before it was postponed by a temporary reprieve to allow Mou to celebrate Christmas with her family one final time. Mou was subsequently put to death two weeks later on 6 January 1995.

== Aftermath ==
The execution of Tsang left four more Hongkongers - Daniel Chan Chi-pun, Poon Yuen-chung, Tong Ching-man and Lam Cheuk-wang - remaining on Singapore's death row for drug trafficking before their respective executions in the year 1995 itself. Out of the four, 38-year-old Chan was later hanged on 10 March 1995 after exhausting his appeals, while the rest - Tong, Lam and Poon - were all put to death on 21 April 1995, therefore becoming the last three from Hong Kong to be executed in Singapore. In total, 15 Hong Kong people have been executed in Singapore since 1989.

In 2010, Alan Shadrake, a British journalist, wrote about Elke Tsang's case in his book Once A Jolly Hangman: Singapore Justice in the Dock, which touched on the issues of capital punishment in Singapore. Shadrake entered Singapore in July 2010 to promote his book but was arrested and charged with contempt of court by the Singapore authorities upon his arrival. Quentin Loh, Singapore's High Court judge, stated that the book contained "half-truths and selective facts; sometimes outright falsehoods" regarding Singapore's judicial system. Shadrake was sentenced to six weeks' imprisonment and a S$20,000 fine, although the sentence was increased to eight weeks after Shadrake failed to pay his fine. Shadrake's appeal was dismissed, and he completed his sentence in July 2011.

== See also ==
- Capital punishment in Singapore
