= Capital punishment in Macau =

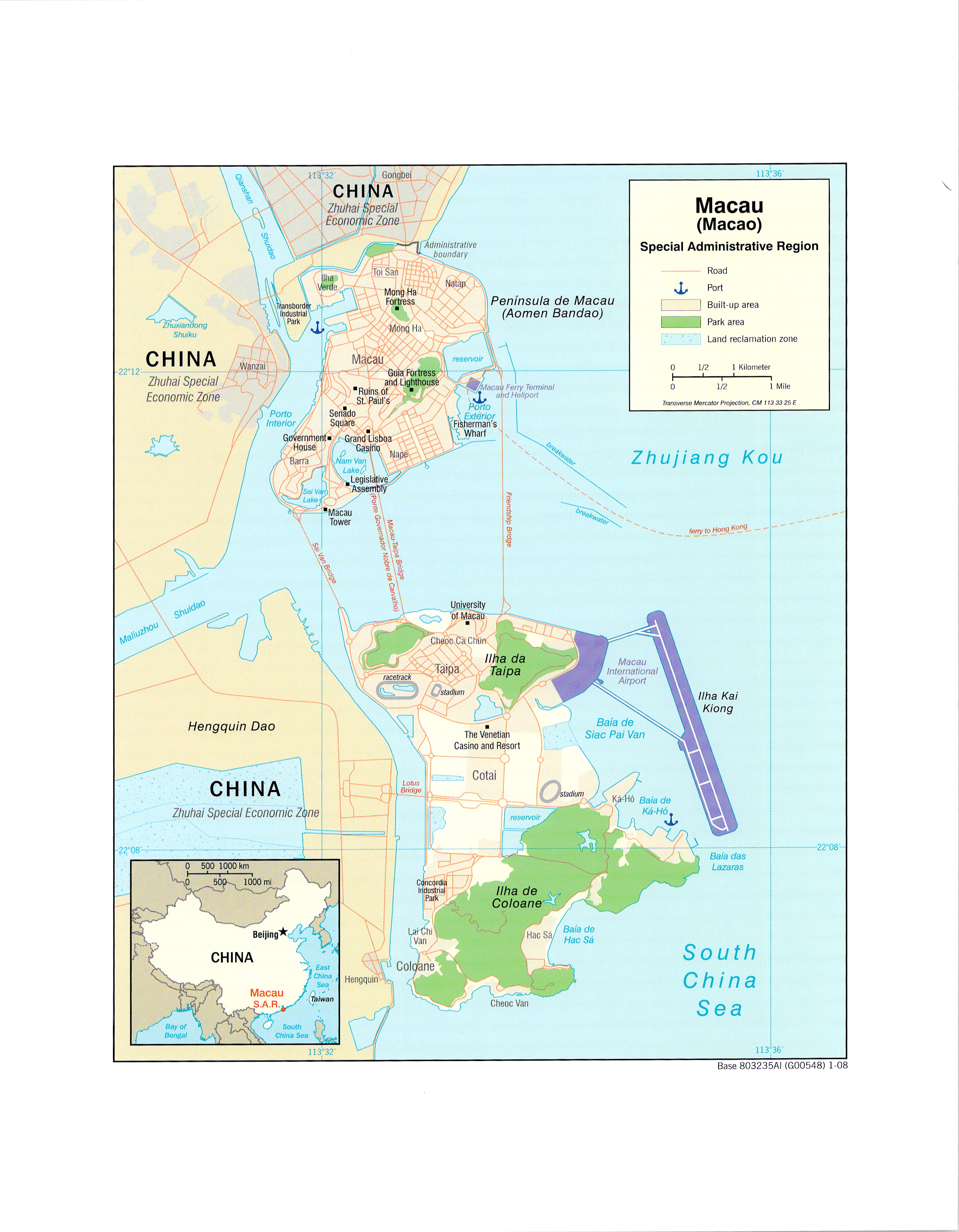
Map of Macau.

Capital punishment in Macau was formally abolished in 1976 and reiterated in the Penal Code of Macau in 1995.

Before that, capital punishment was last used in the 19th century. Under the principle of One Country, Two Systems and Macau's Basic Law, Macau continues its repudiation of capital punishment after the handover to The People's Republic of China in 1999 while capital punishment continues to be practised in The People's Republic of China.

Macau was a Portuguese colony prior to returning to Chinese rule. Macau abided by the laws of their colonisers prior to their transfer. After the transfer of sovereignty, Macau developed their own laws. These laws were based largely upon the Portuguese laws. The final death sentence was handed some time during the 19th century. Although capital punishment is prohibited in Macau, the process of extradition to The People's Republic of China and other countries is still permitted. The Hong Kong protests of 2019 have caused questions around the extradition of criminals from The People's Republic of China’s special administrative regions including Macau. This has caused responses from activists in Macau, who have joined the protests in Hong Kong. The Criminal Code of Macau dictates the penalties and rules regarding offences within the country. None of the articles present in the criminal code allow for the capital punishment as penalty for an offence. The Portuguese government did not permit the revoking of freedom via punishment. The government believed that every individual deserved freedom, thus abolishing capital punishment and life imprisonment. These sentiments were included in the law of Macau whilst colonised. The law regarding capital punishment was allowed to be retained when the country was transferred under the one country, two systems law.

The longest sentence in the Macau legal system is 30 years.

== Background ==
Macau served as a colony of Portugal for a total of 442 years before returning to The People's Republic of China. Macau is currently a special administrative region that resides under the control of The People's Republic of China. Languages spoken in Macau include both Portuguese and Chinese. The legal systems present within modern day Macau are structured in a similar manner to the legal systems of Portugal. As a special administrative region, the government of Macau is able to dictate their own legal system. The level of autonomy of Macau does not include military action or diplomacy. These affairs are handled by the government of The People's Republic of China. Whilst under Portuguese rule, capital punishment was abolished in Macau. After the turnover of Macau to The People's Republic of China, Macau opted to maintain their policy on capital punishment.

Although both Macau and Hong Kong exist as special administrative regions of The People's Republic of China, their state of independence is recognized differently. This differs in their policies on capital punishment. The independence of Macau is recognised through their basic law. The basic law of Macau was created and established in 1993. The basic law of Macau is legally allowed to act independently of the constitutional law of The People's Republic of China. Although Macau is a special administrative region of The People's Republic of China, permanent residency within the country is controlled by Chinese law as a means to protect the independent state. Corruption and crime are prevalent within Macau, especially in policing and casino businesses. Organised crime is extremely prevalent in the region. The casino business of Macau accounts for a large proportion of the GDP of the country. The government of Macau promotes responsible gambling to its citizens and to tourists to keep the revenue flow consistently high. The rate of crime in Macau is relatively low in comparison to cities of similar size in The United States of America.

== Criminal Law ==
The basic law of Macau was established upon returning to The People’s Republic of China and allows Macau to function autonomously as a region of China. This allows Macao to independently enforce their jurisdiction under the one country, two systems policy of The People’s Republic of China.

Within the basic law of Macau, articles dealing with crime exist.

- Article 85 of the basic law of Macau states that the Portuguese system of prosecution and arrest will continue to be used within Macau.
- Article 80 states that the Chief Executive of the country has the authority to excuse offences.
- Article 32 states that authorities may forego freedom of privacy when investigating crime within Macao.
- Article 29 details the right to court trial upon being charged with an offence and that offenders found to be guilty will be punished according to the law.
- The Criminal code of Macau outlines the penalties handed to individuals for breaking the law. The Criminal code covers disobedience, false statements, false testimonials, penalties, bribery to falsely testify and offering bribes.
- Criminal Law in Macau prohibits capital punishment and life imprisonment in the country. Imprisonment within Macau depends on the severity of the crime, with imprisonment being capped at a maximum of 30 years. Shorter sentences may be increased in the case of an offender committing similar offences upon being released.

== Extradition Laws ==
Extradition in Macau is governed by criminal law and constitutes the transfer of criminals between Macau and other countries of the world. The law of extradition in Macau is known as the Surrender of Fugitive Offenders. Extradition can occur through the signing of a treaty or through negotiations without a treaty. Extradition from Macau requires there to be a state of ‘dual criminality’, whereby the offender has committed a crime that both Macao and the requesting country recognise as a crime. Evidence must be provided when negotiating extradition to prove the criminality of the offender. Macau’s chief executive has the power to accept extradition without evidence in the event that he sees reason in doing so. Reasons exist for the declining of extradition request. In the event that Macau is currently investigating the offender when an extradition request arrives, Macau is liable to decline the request. Similarly, Macau may deny the request if it plans to launch an investigation on the matter but has not yet done so. As capital punishment is prohibited within Macau, the country has reason to reject extradition requests in the event that the country said offender is being extradited plans to impose capital punishment on the offender. Other policies are set that control and organise the procedures that need to be undertaken in order for extradition to occur from Macau. The People’s Republic of China has undertaken forced rendition of citizens who have escaped to Macau and subjected some to the death penalty.

== Criminal Activity in Macau ==
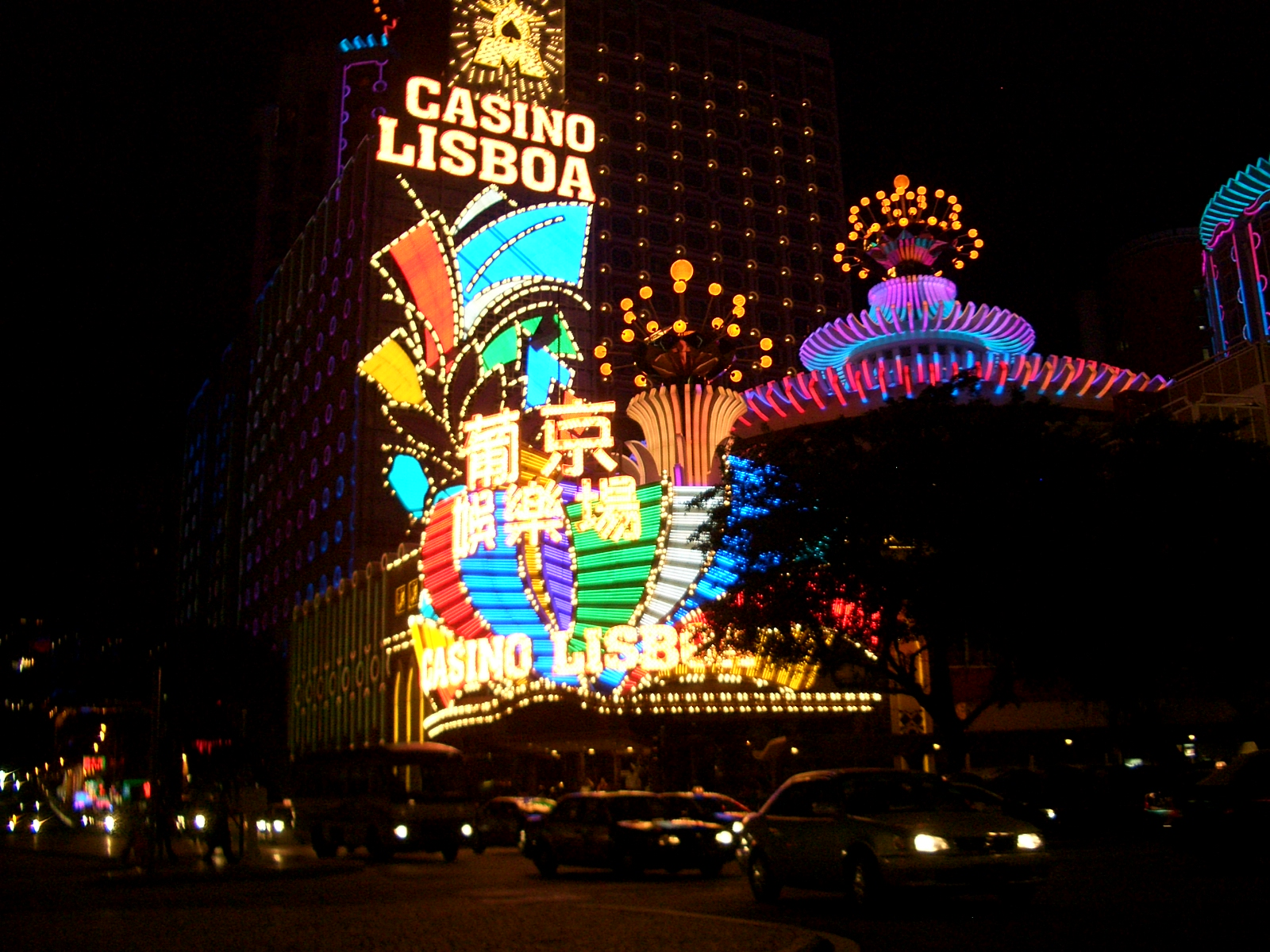
Casino Lisboa Pictured at Night

Crime in Macau increased during the handover period between Portugal and The People's Republic of China, particularly in terms of organised crime. The People's Republic of China attempted to settle the problems within Macau through different measures of intervention. The police system of Macao underwent an overhaul upon the transfer of the country from Portugal to The People's Republic of China. This overhaul proved effective in combatting crime within the country and maintaining peace. This overhaul served to increase the public trust in the police through more transparent communication. Social activists in Macau and protesting suggests that a further development to the policing system will be required before transparency and accountability for actions may be reached. As of 2011, crime rates in Macao have remained at a stable low. The overhaul of the policing system has incorporated both situational and social crime prevention methods into the Macau policing operation. The Casino businesses of Macau are one of its greatest economical assets. These casinos are rampant with criminal activity, particularly activity relating to organised crime. The Department of the Investigation of Gaming-Related and Economic Crimes is a division of the Macao police force that presides criminal activity relating to casinos. The penal code of Macau is the document that dictates the laws and policies regarding criminal activities and the punishment these activities bring. Max sentences are very rarely dealt upon criminals and are reserved for heinous crimes. The penal code states specific laws and punishments regarding major crimes such as terrorism, human trafficking, money laundering, and drug distribution or drug related criminal activity. Cross border criminal activity was prevalent prior to the handover of Macau to The People’s Republic of China, but was heavily regulated by the Chinese government after 1999. Close to 11,000 criminal incidents occurred within Macau in the year 2009, all of which were reported to and dealt with by the judiciary police, a sub-division of the Macau police force. According to statistics gathered by the Federal Bureau of Investigation, Macau’s crime rates against citizens per 100,000 citizens was 462 and rates of homicide per 100,000 citizens sat close to a value of 1.

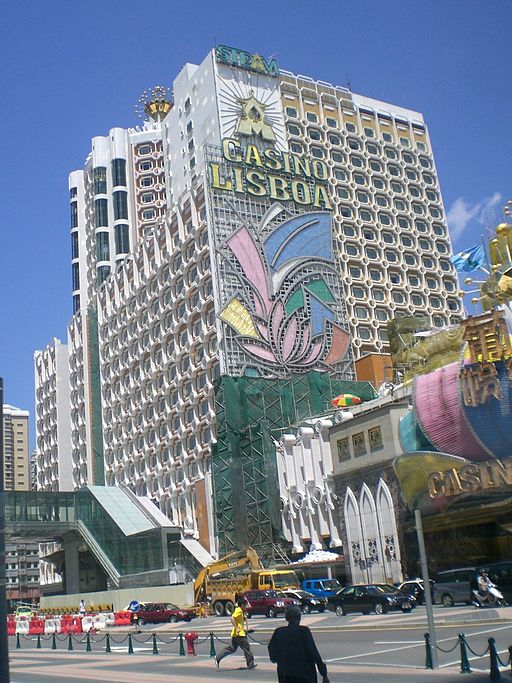
Casino Lisboa pictured during the day

=== Organised Crime in Macau ===
The Casino business was heavily regulated and organised crime groups were prosecuted during the handover of Macau to The People's Republic of China. Triad based organised crime was prevalent in Macau prior to the year 2000, particularly in casinos within the country. Conflicts between triad groups over territory threatened the country of Macau and its people in the 1990s. Conflicts involved various triad groups vying for control of the Macau casinos to increase the funds of the crime groups through business. Violence was commonly used as a threat towards opposing organised crime groups during this period. The government of Macau has organised a tactical unit division of the police force that aims to target and deal with serious crime and violence within the country. Actions to attain money and offer protections by organised crime groups included triad leaders running VIP lounges, where high money bets were able to be made under the protection of the crime group. Other crimes included money laundering, scamming and blackmail. If convicted of crimes relating to these subjects, a maximum 3-year jail sentence may be delivered. Organised crime group VIP rooms are beneficial to casino revenue in Macau. Organised crime groups offer loans to individuals who lose money on gambling, putting them in debt to the crime group. This keeps individuals gambling in the casino for longer, increasing the revenue of the business. Some VIP rooms are still being run by triad leaders, even after the overhaul of the policing system. The number of gambling related crimes increased threefold between 2002 and 2009, with a little over 1600 cases of these crimes occurring throughout 2009. Social crime present in casinos threatened public order in Macau, resulting in heavier regulatory efforts by the government. These crimes do not carry incredibly heavy sentences but make up a large portion of crimes in Macao.

== Issues with Capital Punishment Laws ==
Issues relating to the capital punishment laws between Macau and The People’s Republic of China have previously arisen, resulting in negotiations occurring relating to jurisdiction. The government of The People’s Republic of China has decided that the country of Macau’s stance towards capital punishment may remain for as long as Macau deems it is necessary.

=== Public Opinion ===
Patriotism towards The People’s Republic of China is prevalent in Macao. It is possible that the laws regarding capital punishment in Macau could be overhauled when The People’s Republic of China regains control of Macau as a result of this patriotism. Protests and backlash would likely arise if an overhaul is to take place. Public opinion towards the government of Macau is divided. Some individuals are unhappy with the election of leaders being done through committee voting rather than a vote by the populace. The public has recommended that polls be conducted to investigate citizen opinion on policies being constructed and put forth. Policies that take into consideration the opinion of the public will lead to increased trust towards the governing body. The policies referred to include crime, housing, business laws and others. As of 2001, 54.9% of individuals in Macao that were surveyed indicated that they disapprove of the governments idea to punish serious crimes prior to a trial occurring. A majority of the public seeks to see a fair criminal system that functions without the need for capital punishment as a sentence. Still, a large proportion of surveyed civilians indicated that they were afraid of chaos resulting in Macau as a result of serious crime occurrence. These surveyed civilians indicated that they would prefer that there was intervention prior to trial occurrence in order to prevent the disruption of regular social life in Macau. Perceptions towards this varied by age group, with 72% of university students disagreeing with the previously mentioned issue.

== See also ==
- Human rights in Macau
- Capital punishment in Hong Kong
- Capital punishment in China
- Capital punishment in Taiwan
- Capital punishment in Portugal
