= Zhang Yiyang =

21st-century Chinese singer

- 张艺洋
- Born: 1 May 1990; Xingping, Xianyang, Shaanxi, China
- Died: 18 December 2024 (aged 34); Xingping, Shaanxi, China
- Cause of death: Execution by firing squad
- Other name: Gui Zai (鬼仔)
- Occupations: singer; actor
- Years active: 2015 – 2022
- Known for: Crying Man
- Criminal charges: Murder
- Criminal penalty: Death

Chinese name
- Traditional Chinese: 張藝洋
- Simplified Chinese: 张艺洋
Transcriptions
Standard Mandarin
- Hanyu Pinyin: Zhāng Yìyáng

Zhang Yiyang (simplified Chinese: 张艺洋; traditional Chinese: 張藝洋; pinyin: Zhāng Yìyáng, 1 May 1990 – 18 December 2024), also known as Gui Zai (Chinese: 鬼仔; pinyin: Guǐ Zǎi), was a Chinese singer and actor. Zhang's main songs include "I Only Care About People Who Care About Me", "Crying Man", "So Care About You", among others.

After being convicted of murder, Zhang was executed by firing squad in December 2024.

== Career ==
In April 2012, Zhang was invited to participate in the reality show entertainment program Happy to Move and won third place.

On June 19, 2015, his first original album Crying Man was released.

In August 2016, Zhang appeared as a guest on The Modern Heroes.

In September 2016, Zhang participated in the Colding Stereo music event.

In October 2016, Zhang was invited to participate in Tangshan's 2017 Lei Feng Spring Festival Gala.

In December 2016, Zhang participated in the CCTV Charm China Tour program and sang "Will Anyone Tell You" in the live show.

In 2017, he participated in the Next Idol Wuhan Division.

In June 2018, he performed in the movie The Soul of the Dragon.

In September 2018, he performed in the online series Spontaneous Combustion at the First Time.

In 2021, Zhang starred in the film 追人 (Chumongin), for which he also served as director and screenwriter.

== Murder conviction and execution ==
In December 2024, Zhang was found guilty of having murdered his 16-year-old girlfriend on February 26, 2022. He was sentenced to death and executed by firing squad on 18 December 2024, in the first known case of an entertainer being sentenced to death in China.

According to court documents from the Intermediate People's Court of Xianyang City, Zhang and the victim, a minor identified only as "A" who was 15 or 16 years old at the time — around fifteen years younger than Zhang — began a relationship c. 2021 (Chosun Biz reported the relationship began in 2019). Zhang reportedly threatened and controlled the victim throughout the relationship, including repeated threats of suicide when she raised the possibility of breaking up.

On 26 February 2022, using the pretext of a birthday celebration, Zhang lured the victim to a forested area near Xingguang breeding ground on Xingli Road in Xingping City, Shaanxi. When she told him she wanted to end the relationship, an argument broke out and Zhang fatally stabbed her multiple times in the neck with a folding knife, severing her carotid artery, jugular vein, trachea and esophagus; she died at the scene. Zhang subsequently attempted to dispose of evidence, including the victim's phone and his own bloodied clothing, and, according to Chosun Biz, mutilated the body before abandoning it. The following day, Zhang checked into a hotel and attempted suicide but was discovered by staff, who alerted police; he was hospitalized and then arrested.

Zhang was convicted of murder and abandonment of a corpse; the court described his motive as vicious and his method as extremely brutal, finding no evidence of remorse. He appealed the verdict, but it was upheld by the appellate court and the Supreme People's Court, and the death sentence was carried out by firing squad on 18 December 2024, the same day the ruling was finalized. Zhang is believed to be the first working celebrity in mainland China to be executed.

== Posthumous release and controversy ==
In early 2025, Zhang's posthumous film 解音 (Jieyou Sound Hall), on which he had worked as an actor, was released and drew renewed public controversy, with critics questioning why his work continued to be promoted despite the nature of his crime. Unlike other Chinese celebrities implicated in misconduct, Zhang was not added to the entertainment industry's informal "bad artist" blacklist, and his existing works were not withdrawn from circulation.
