= Roshdi Abdullah Altway =

Singaporean convicted murderer and drug trafficker (1959–2025)

- 1993 police mugshot of Roshdi Abdullah Altway
- Born: Roshdi bin Abdullah Altway; 1959; Colony of Singapore
- Died: 10 April 2025 (aged 65); Changi Prison, Singapore
- Occupations: Salesman (former; 1993)
- Spouse: Unnamed wife
- Status: Executed by hanging
- Convictions: 1993; Murder, later reduced to manslaughter Illegal possession of a revolver and six bullets (x2); 2007; Drug consumption and trafficking Subutex tablets 2020; Capital diamorphine trafficking
- Criminal charges: 1993; Murder; Illegal possession of a revolver and six bullets (x2); 2007; Drug consumption and trafficking Subutex tablets 2016; Capital diamorphine trafficking
- Penalty: 1993; Death, commuted to 10 years' jail (consecutive); Six years' jail and 12 strokes of the cane (consecutive); 2007; 12 years' jail and ten strokes of the cane 2020; Death

Roshdi bin Abdullah Altway (1959 – 10 April 2025) was a Singaporean convicted murderer and drug trafficker. Roshdi first gained notoriety in 1993 for the murder of a narcotics officer. Roshdi was charged with murdering Rajab Mohamed, an inspector of the Central Narcotics Bureau (CNB), by battering the officer to death with a granite mortar in 1993. Although Roshdi stated in his defence that he acted in self-defence when he mistook the inspector for trying to reach for his revolver and harm him, Roshdi was nonetheless found guilty of murdering Inspector Rajab and sentenced to death after his defence was rejected.

In 1994, upon his appeal, Roshdi's claims of self-defence were accepted, and therefore his death sentence was commuted to ten years’ jail for manslaughter, in addition to six years' jail and 12 strokes of the cane for illegal possession of a revolver and six bullets.

After his release however, Roshdi re-offended and he was sentenced in 2007 to 12 years' jail and ten strokes of the cane for trafficking Subutex tablets and for drug consumption. After his parole and release from this sentence, Roshdi was caught for capital diamorphine trafficking in 2016, and he was sentenced to death a second time after failing to substantiate his defence of safekeeping but not trafficking the 78.77g of diamorphine. After losing his appeals against his second death sentence, Roshdi was hanged in Changi Prison on 10 April 2025.

== Personal life ==
Roshdi bin Abdullah Altway was born in Singapore in 1959. He had at least one sister in his family. Roshdi was married sometime during his adulthood, but it is not known if he had any children.

Roshdi worked as a salesman prior to his arrest in March 1993 for murder, and some sources also described Roshdi's occupation as a businessman. He also had previous records of drug consumption, and was detained under the Criminal Law Act at one point. In 1990, Roshdi was arrested by the Central Narcotics Bureau (CNB) for allegedly selling drugs, but he subsequently became an informant of the CNB (with the codename "786") after agreeing to the request of Inspector Rajab Mohamed, who was in charge of the investigations in Roshdi's case. Reportedly, Roshdi and Inspector Rajab befriended each other and they operated as bookies at the Turf Club, and both men often place bets against each other. Roshdi reportedly also lent Inspector Rajab about S$40,000 in relation to the bets they made. This friendship however, lasted for merely three years before the two men fell out over monetary issues and it ended with the murder of Inspector Rajab Mohamed.

== Murder of Inspector Rajab Mohamed (1993) ==
=== Arrest and investigations ===
CNB Inspector Rajab Mohamed (aged 35), who was found murdered three days after he went missing

On the night of 8 March 1993, Inspector Rajab Mohamed was last seen alive by his wife, who saw him responding to a pager call at his home, and he also told his wife that he was going to meet his informant at Serangoon North. Aside from this, he called his office and asked his men to stand by for a drug bust and he would make a second call. However, the call never came, and Inspector Rajab did not return home later that night. A day after his disappearance, Inspector Rajab's 32-year-old wife Masita Sanoesia, a Singapore Coast Guard corporal who was then three months pregnant, reported her husband missing to the police, and both Inspector Rajab's family and friends helped to search for Inspector Rajab in some parts of Singapore, and just five minutes before the discovery of Inspector Rajab's death, his sister tried to contact a newspaper to publicly appeal for information of her whereabouts.

Meanwhile, the police investigated the disappearance of Inspector Rajab, and through the phone records, they identified Roshdi Abdullah Altway as the same informant whom the missing inspector was meeting on that night, and arrested him on suspicion of being involved in the disappearance of Inspector Rajab. After his arrest on 10 March 1993, Roshdi confessed to the police that he murdered Inspector Rajab.

On the night of 11 March 1993, Roshdi led the police to a Tampines multi-storey carpark, where the decomposing body of 35-year-old Inspector Rajab Mohamed was found in the back-seat of his car. At the time when Inspector Rajab's corpse was found, he was speculated to have died for more than two days, and his skull was found to have been crushed, purportedly caused by blunt force trauma caused by multiple blows inflicted with a blunt object. According to Dr Wee Keng Poh, a forensic pathologist who performed an autopsy on the victim, there were multiple skull fractures on his head and a large amount of force was exerted in inflicting the blows that caused these injuries, which were sufficient in the ordinary course of nature to cause death. At the same time, Inspector Rajab's revolver and ammunition, consisting of five or six bullets, were recovered from the Ang Mo Kio flat of Roshdi's mother-in-law. Police investigations classified Inspector Rajab's death as murder, and on 13 March 1993, 34-year-old Roshdi Abdullah Altway was charged with the murder of Inspector Rajab, which was confirmed to have taken place on 8 March 1993, three days before his corpse was discovered.

Background information revealed that Inspector Rajab first joined the Central Narcotics Bureau (CNB) on 1 July 1977 as an assistant narcotics officer, and after completing his training at the police academy, Inspector Rajab was posted to the Supervision Division, and in February 1983, he was promoted to a sergeant and he rose to become an inspector in September 1987. At the time he died, Inspector Rajab was in charge of the harbour and railway team, and was known to be a dedicated and hard-working officer. Inspector Rajab Mohamed, who left behind a pregnant wife and two children (a four-year-old son Mohd Ariff and a seven-year-old daughter Nur Shaikhah), was believed to be the first CNB officer to be murdered while on the line of duty. Over 200 CNB officers had attended Inspector Rajab's funeral, and neighbours all described Inspector Rajab and his wife as good people who treated others well. Eight former drug addicts, one of whom knew Inspector Rajab, offered a special prayer for Inspector Rajab. Notably, of all his former cases, Inspector Rajab took charge of investigating Hongkonger Elke Tsang Kai-mong for drug trafficking; Tsang, who stood trial after Inspector Rajab's death, was convicted and hanged for trafficking 4.1307 kg of diamorphine in 1994.

=== Roshdi's murder trial ===
On 15 November 1993, 34-year-old Roshdi Abdullah Altway claimed trial to one count of murder, one count of illegally possessing a revolver and one count of illegally possessing six live rounds of ammunition. The prosecution was led by Mathavan Devadas and Chua Eu Jin, while Roshdi was represented by Singa Retnam during his trial. The trial was presided over by Judicial Commissioner Kan Ting Chiu of the High Court. Roshdi's joint trial for murder and the non-capital firearm charges was known to be unusual in Singapore, where a person charged for murder or other offences attracting the death penalty cannot be tried in the same court for any other non-capital charges, which were normally held in abeyance until the end of the capital trial.

The trial court was told of Inspector Rajab's friendship with Roshdi, and it was further adduced that Roshdi had owed about S$4,000 to Inspector Rajab as a result of the bets they made together. Based on Roshdi's statements, after meeting up at Roshdi's Serangoon North flat, there was an argument between Inspector Rajab and Roshdi over the debt, and this escalated into a fight when Inspector Rajab strangled Roshdi and punched him on the stomach, and while he endured the blows, Roshdi noticed that Inspector Rajab was reaching for his bag, and presuming that Inspector Rajab was trying to draw his revolver and hurt him, Roshdi managed to pick up a granite chilli mortar to repeatedly bludgeon Inspector Rajab on the head multiple times, and this led to the death of Inspector Rajab. Overall, Roshdi's defence was that he killed Inspector Rajab while acting in self-defence, and he killed Inspector Rajab during a fight, and he insisted he never had the intention to commit murder.

After the fight, Roshdi, who wrapped up Inspector Rajab's body with cloth, found the body too heavy to carry and hence called his wife and enlisted her help (although it took a lot of begging and pleading to convince his reluctant wife to help him) to dispose of Inspector Rajab's body by placing it in the backseat of Inspector Rajab's car and abandoning it at a carpark in Tampines. Roshdi also subsequently took away Inspector Rajab's revolver and bullets and hid it at his mother-in-law's flat, and he never intended to have any use for the revolver, which he thought of returning to a police station before he was ultimately arrested.

On 27 November 1993, Judicial Commissioner Kan Ting Chiu delivered his verdict. In his judgement, Judicial Commissioner Kan rejected Roshdi's defence of having killed Inspector Rajab in self-defence during a fight, pointing out that Roshdi was inconsistent in his claims of whether Inspector Rajab had drawn his revolver before or after Roshdi used the chilli mortar to bludgeon Inspector Rajab on the head, and Roshdi gave multiple versions of the murder to the police and other witnesses, which raised doubts over the reliability of his evidence. Noting that Roshdi did not tell the police that Inspector Rajab was the aggressor at first hand, Judicial Commissioner Kan also cited the evidence that Roshdi had been subjected to a medical examination after his arrest, and he never mentioned about being hit on the stomach despite having told the doctor that he was strangled by Inspector Rajab, and for these inconsistencies in Roshdi's testimony and statements, Judicial Commissioner Kan hence ruled that Roshdi did not satisfactorily prove that he acted in self-defence and caused Inspector Rajab's death due to a sudden fight. Given the fact that Roshdi admitted to using the chilli mortar to repeatedly batter Inspector Rajab until he died, such that the injuries caused were sufficient in the ordinary course of nature to cause death, Judicial Commissioner Kan found that there were sufficient grounds to return with a verdict of murder in Roshdi's case.

Therefore, 34-year-old Roshdi Abdullah Altway was found guilty of murder, and sentenced to death by hanging. At the same time, Roshdi was also convicted of the remaining two charges of possessing Inspector Rajab's revolver and six bullets, and he was therefore sentenced to concurrent sentences of six years' jail and six strokes of the cane for each of the two charges, although Roshdi was not allowed to serve both these jail terms as long as his death sentence was not commuted.

== Death row, appeal and reprieve ==
During his time on death row, Roshdi was called as a witness in the murder trial of his former cellmate Somporn Chinpakdhee, a former Thai construction worker who was charged with murdering his compatriot and colleague Kulap Nophakhun in 1993. Roshdi had testified to support Somporn's claim that he had been abused and forced to confess to the murder during police interrogation, and he denied that he was lying during the prosecution's cross-examination, stating that he had nothing to gain or lose since he was not a friend of Somporn and he himself was already condemned to death row. Eventually, Somporn was acquitted of murder in August 1994, the same month when Roshdi's appeal was due to be heard by the Court of Appeal.

On 22 August 1994, the Court of Appeal heard Roshdi's appeal and delivered their ruling. The three-judge appeal court, consisting of Justice M. Karthigesu, Justice L. P. Thean (Thean Lip Ping), and Justice Goh Joon Seng, allowed the appeal and overturned both the murder conviction and death sentence of Roshdi. Instead, they found Roshdi guilty of a lesser charge of culpable homicide not amounting to murder, which was equivalent to manslaughter in Singaporean legal terms, and sentenced him to ten years' imprisonment.

Explaining why they acquitted Roshdi of murder, Justice Karthigesu, who delivered the verdict of the appellate court, stated that Roshdi's account of his physical dispute with Inspector Rajab was not inconsistent with his cautioned statement, and the original trial judge Kan Ting Chiu had erred in rejecting Roshdi's version of events in court since in the absence of other objective evidence, Roshdi's account was "not incredible enough to be rendered unworthy of credit" and he should be given the benefit of the doubt. Aside from this, the appellate court was satisfied that the murder of Inspector Rajab was not premeditated and it arose from a sudden fight between Roshdi and Inspector Rajab over the money which Roshdi owed to the narcotics officer, and Roshdi never taken any undue advantage or acted in a cruel and unusual manner during the fight. Based on Roshdi's account, it could be inferred that Roshdi was fearful for his life during the "relentless" assault initiated by Inspector Rajab, and from this, Justice Karthigesu stated that it was reasonable for Roshdi to believe that Inspector Rajab was about to brandish his revolver and therefore acted in self-defence, which resulted in the death of 35-year-old Inspector Rajab Mohamed.

Having reached this conclusion, the Court of Appeal therefore dismissed the murder charge, revoked the death sentence and hence sentenced Roshdi to ten years' jail for manslaughter, and furthermore, they ordered that Roshdi's ten-year sentence should run consecutively with the six years' imprisonment and caning he received for illegally possessing Inspector Rajab's revolver and bullets. As a result of this outcome, 35-year-old Roshdi Abdullah Altway was spared the gallows, and he received a total of 16 years' imprisonment and 12 strokes of the cane. Roshdi's 42-year-old sister, who was present in court with their aunt and Roshdi's sister-in-law, told the press that she was relieved and thankful that her brother no longer faced the death penalty for murdering Inspector Rajab.

== 2007 drug trafficking conviction ==
Roshdi, who was released on parole presumably in 2003, was arrested and tried for smuggling Subutex tablets and consuming drugs in 2007. During that same year, Roshdi, then 48 years old, was found guilty of these related charges and therefore sentenced to 12 years' imprisonment and ten strokes of the cane. By 2016, Roshdi was released on parole for good behaviour after completing two-thirds of his jail term (equivalent to eight years).

== 2016 drug trafficking charge ==
On 14 September 2016, sometime after he was released, Roshdi, then 57 years old, was once again arrested, this time for capital drug trafficking. Roshdi was arrested at his flat in Compassvale Lane after the officers of the Central Narcotics Bureau (CNB) watched him under surveillance and caught him. Roshdi was among the four or five suspected drug offenders arrested on the same day on that same day as reported by the CNB, in which they seized a total of 6.3 kg of diamorphine (or pure heroin), 3.5 kg of marijuana (or cannabis) and 280g of methamphetamine worth over S$600,000 from all these unrelated cases. The drug supply and drug paraphernalia seized from Roshdi's possession were found to contain not less than 78.77g of diamorphine, an amount which was more than five times the minimum amount (which is 15g) that mandated the death sentence under the Misuse of Drugs Act if found guilty. Roshdi was charged with capital drug trafficking which potentially made him face the gallows again for the second time.

Roshdi's drug trafficking trial began at the High Court on 17 September 2019. The trial was presided by Justice Valerie Thean, and the prosecution was led by Mark Tay, Chan Yi Cheng and Shana Poon of the Attorney General's Chambers, while Roshdi was represented by Peter Keith Fernando, Rajan Sanjiv Kumar and Lee May Ling. The prosecution's case, based on Roshdi's statements, reflected that Roshdi possessed the drugs in his room for the purpose of sale and trafficking, and that he had repacked and delivered drugs on multiple occasions. However, when Roshdi took the stand and testify, he backtracked on what he said and claimed that he was only safekeeping the drugs for a man named "Aru". He also alleged that he was coerced to confess, and he stated that during the course of questioning, the CNB officers told him in Malay that there was a "new law" and that he would not be hanged if the drugs did not belong to him.

Investigations revealed that the real identity of "Aru" was an Indian national named Chandran Prasanna Anu, who was first identified when he entered Singapore on 19 January 2019 and was arrested in connection to Roshdi's case, and charged with abetting Roshdi to commit drug trafficking, but two months after he was first charged, "Aru" was granted a discharge not amounting to an acquittal on 19 March 2019 and repatriated that same day. Assistant Superintendent of Police (ASP) Yang Rongluan, who was in charge of investigating the involvement of "Aru", testified in court that her investigation findings did not disclose that "Aru" had any involvement relating to the drugs found in Roshdi's possession. The statements of "Aru" were, however, presented in court, and it revealed that in 2016, he first met Roshdi through a friend after he went to Singapore to find employment before the expiration of his visitor's pass, and Roshdi promised to help him find a job. According to "Aru", he had tried several attempts to go in and out of Singapore before he was compelled to return to India due to his failure to obtain a new visitor's pass to travel to and stay in Singapore, and he received news from Roshdi that his job application was unsuccessful. Despite this, none of the statements reportedly connected "Aru" to Roshdi in relation to any alleged involvement in Roshdi's crime.

== Roshdi's second death sentence ==
=== Trial verdict and death penalty ===
On 17 August 2020, Justice Valerie Thean delivered her verdict. In her judgement, Justice Thean rejected Roshdi's defence that he was induced into making the confession due to the officers promising him that he would not hang for drug trafficking. She stated that she accepted the officers' testimony that they never made such promises or coerce Roshdi into making the statements, and she also noted that Roshdi had a mistrust of CNB officers, which originated from his previous stints of incarceration for killing Inspector Rajab Mohamed back in 1993 and the trafficking of Subutex tablets and drug use in 2007, and a government psychiatrist also corroborated this part of evidence, and this further gave rise to the inference that Roshdi would be sceptical and wary, not trusting and unquestioning, and she thus rejected Roshdi's supposed trust in the officers' alleged promise that he would not be executed. Additionally, Justice Thean stated that the statements of Roshdi should be accepted over the version of events he gave in court during his trial, since he admitted in his statements that he possessed the drugs in order to sell them and had also repackaged the drugs before selling them, and his evidence overall was full of discrepancies that it affected his credibility as a witness. Aside from this, Roshdi's explanation that the S$18,000 found in his possession would have yielded 3,000 kg of anchovies, based on his professed price of $6 per 1 kg, and this explanation contradicted his statement where the money was his earnings from selling contraband cigarettes.

In concluding that a conviction for drug trafficking was warranted in Roshdi's case, Justice Thean summarized in her own words:

Roshdi’s professed willingness to lie, coupled with his illogical responses on the stand, went to issues of general credibility and were consistent with my finding that the statements, rather than his version on the stand, were reliable.

Therefore, 61-year-old Roshdi Abdullah Altway was found guilty of diamorphine trafficking with pursuant to Section 5(1) of the Misuse of Drugs Act. In relation to Roshdi's sentence, Justice Thean found that Roshidi did not act as a courier at the time of the offence, and he neither received certification for providing substantive assistance to the investigations nor suffered from diminished responsibility at the time of the crime, and on these grounds, Justice Thean sentenced Roshdi to the mandatory death penalty, the only sentence permitted for Roshdi due to the circumstances of his crime. Roshdi was hence sentenced to death for the second time after 26 years since he escaped the gallows for the murder of Inspector Rajab Mohamed back in 1994. The news of Roshdi's second death sentence for drug trafficking was not known to the public until it was reported in the media for the first time three months after it was imposed, when Justice Thean's full grounds of decision was released.

=== Appeal and outcome ===
A year after Roshdi was sentenced to hang, his appeal was brought forward for hearing at the Court of Appeal, with a five-judge panel - consisting of Chief Justice Sundaresh Menon, three Judges of Appeal Judith Prakash, Steven Chong and Andrew Phang, and Senior Judge Chao Hick Tin - appointed to hear the appeal. Seeking to have both his death sentence and drug trafficking conviction overturned, Roshdi argued that the trial court was wrong to reject his defence of safekeeping the drugs and the prosecution also did not fulfill additional disclosure obligations by disclosing the statements of "Aru" at a late stage during the proceedings, and he also sought to argue through his lawyer that his statements should not have been admitted at trial due to him not making them voluntarily. Defence lawyer Andre Darius Jumabhoy, who took over Roshdi's case with his two associates Low Ying Ning Elaine and Priscilla Chia Wen Qi, argued that it should not be presumed that Roshdi was possessing the diamorphine for the purpose of trafficking when he was only temporarily safekeeping the drugs and returning it to its original owner "Aru".

In response to the defence's position, deputy Attorney-General Hri Kumar Nair, who represented the prosecution, rebutted that the trial judge was correct to, in light of the objective evidence, reject his defence of safekeeping the drugs and not trafficking them, and the trial judge also correctly admitted the statements as evidence against Roshdi by finding that he voluntarily provided them to the police. Additionally, the prosecution also conceded that "Aru" could have been a material witness crucial to either contradict or support the defence of Roshdi, but it did not mean that by its omission to call "Aru" as a witness, the prosecution had breached its duty to disclose relevant evidence or witnesses to the defence.

On 11 November 2021, the Court of Appeal delivered their judgement, with Chief Justice Menon pronouncing the decision in court. The five judges unanimously ruled that Roshdi's appeal should be dismissed, and they confirmed both the death sentence and drug trafficking conviction imposed in Roshdi's case. The Court of Appeal explained that in relation to Roshdi's first contention on whether or not the statements he contested in court should be admitted, they felt that the alleged conversation between Roshdi and the CNB officers did not objectively constitute a threat, inducement or promise to make Roshdi fess up on anything he could provide the officers during the investigation, and they agreed with the original trial judge's findings that the officers did not make inducements or promises to Roshdi at any point during the investigations. They also disagreed that the prosecution failed to uphold their duty and obligation to the court by not calling "Aru" as a witness during his trial.

Chief Justice Menon also cited in the verdict that based on the statements provided by "Aru", the trial judge cannot be compelled to accept Roshdi's claim that "Aru" was involved in the offence Roshdi was convicted for, given that none of his evidence suggested that "Aru" was involved in drug trafficking and had delivered the drugs to Roshdi for safekeeping, and the only matter that connected "Aru" and Roshdi was the desire by "Aru" to look for a job through Roshdi's arrangement. Additionally, the Court of Appeal found that Roshdi had given a clear account in his statements as to the role he played in receiving, packing, selling and distributing drugs, and his safekeeping defence was only raised for the first time during his trial, and they found it to be incredible that Roshdi would want to omit such a crucial detail for such a long time before he stood trial. The appellate court also clarified that even if it was true that Roshdi was indeed safekeeping the drugs for "Aru", it did not detract from the fact that Roshdi knew that these drugs were meant for sale and he element of possession for the purpose of trafficking would still be established, since his actions were substantially part of a full one-time transaction that distribute the drugs and smuggle them for sale. On these grounds, the Court of Appeal turned down the appeal of 62-year-old Roshdi Abdullah Altway and affirmed his conviction, and hence confirmed the death penalty in his case.

=== Other legal motions ===
Two years after the loss of his appeal, in December 2023, Roshdi, together with 35 other death row inmates (including convicted murderers Teo Ghim Heng and Iskandar bin Rahmat, and drug traffickers Datchinamurthy Kataiah and Pannir Selvam Pranthaman), filed a constituitional challenge to oppose the newly enacted Post-Appeal Applications in Capital Cases Act (Pacc Act), which was implemented to monitor the last-minute appeals made by death row convicts who had used up all avenues of appeal. The 36 plaintiffs argued that the new law was discriminatory against death row inmates and it would hinder the last chances of the convicts' access to justice, which also violated the need for fairness during the legal proceedings. However, Justice Hoo Sheau Peng of the High Court dismissed the motion, citing that the law was passed due to the rising number of inmates filing last-minute appeals before their executions and abusing of court processes, and it can be used to distinguish and dismiss any appeals that were made without merit. Justice Hoo also said that the legal rights of the plaintiffs were not violated by the provisions of the Pacc Act, since the law was not passed for enforcement yet. An follow-up appeal by the same 36 plaintiffs was dismissed by the Court of Appeal on 27 March 2024.

On 9 May 2024, Roshdi and another 35 death row prisoners appealed to the High Court, arguing that the policy of the Legal Assistance Scheme for Capital Offences (LASCO) was not to assign counsel for death row inmates who filed further legal motions after exhausting their avenues of appeal against capital punishment and conviction, and this infringed the need to uphold fairness of court processes and constitutional rights of the prisoners, as well as breaching their access to justice and right to legal representation. However, 11 days after the appeal was filed, Justice Dedar Singh Gill found there was no reasonable cause of action and dismissed the motion, as the LASCO was "perfectly entitled to adopt or change its policy regarding its provision of legal aid", and there could have been multiple reasons for LASCO to not assign lawyers for such convicts, such as the need to allocate resources to aid new defendants who were facing trial and appeal and deter possible abuse of court processes. The judge also stated that the lack of representation from LASCO in post-appeal applications did not deprive the accused persons of their right to life or personal liberty, which was especially so since all the plaintiffs in this case were already convicted and sentenced at this stage, and also exhausted their appeals against conviction and/or sentence, and their rights to access to justice were not violated by the lack of free legal representation, given that they still had the entitlement to engage lawyers on their own accord in any post-appeal applications. Aside from this, Justice Gill said while the applicants should not be deterred from filing applications with merit to prevent the miscarriage of justice, but any motions launched "at an eleventh hour and without merit" should be regarded as a "stopgap" measure to delay the carrying out of the offender's death sentence. On these grounds, Justice Gill rejected the appeal.

== Execution ==
On 3 April 2025, Roshdi Abdullah Altway received his death warrant, which scheduled his execution date for 10 April 2025. Roshdi filed an appeal on the eve of his execution and sought to delay his execution with hopes to pursue further judicial review of his case. However, Justice Belinda Ang rejected his appeal.

On 10 April 2025, 65-year-old Roshdi Abdullah Altway was hanged in Changi Prison. The Central Narcotics Bureau (CNB) confirmed in a media statement that Roshdi's death sentence was carried out and his petition for clemency from the President of Singapore was also rejected prior to his execution. The day before Roshdi was hanged, another drug trafficker named Mohammad Reduan Mustaffar (aged 41) was executed on 9 April 2025 for methamphetamine trafficking (the amount smuggled weighed not less than 661.2g in Mohammad Reduan's case).

In response to the back-to-back executions of Roshdi and Mohammad Reduan, the European Union (EU) condemned Singapore for the double hangings and expressed their opposition to the death penalty, claiming it was cruel and unusual punishment and opposed the right to life, and failed to become an effective deterrent to crime. The EU also called on the Singapore government to impose a moratorium on all remaining death sentences and abolish the death penalty.

== See also ==
- Capital punishment in Singapore
