= Execution of Angel Mou Pui Peng =

25 year old female Macau resident executed in Singapore for heroin trafficking in 1995

Angel Mou Pui Peng
- 毛佩萍
- Angel after her arrest in 1991
- Born: Mou Pui Peng; 9 July 1969; Portuguese Macau
- Died: 6 January 1995 (aged 25); Changi Prison, Singapore
- Cause of death: Execution by hanging
- Citizenship: Portuguese citizen
- Occupations: Cashier; Sales clerk
- Status: Executed
- Conviction: Drug trafficking
- Penalty: Death

Chinese name
- Chinese: 毛佩萍
- Hanyu Pinyin: Máo Pèipíng
- Jyutping: mou^{4} pui^{3} ping^{4}

Alternative Chinese name
- Chinese: 莫佩萍
- Hanyu Pinyin: Mò Pèipíng
- Jyutping: mok^{6} pui^{3} ping^{4}

Angel Mou Pui Peng (Chinese: 毛佩萍; Jyutping: mou^{4} pui^{3} ping^{4}; pinyin: Máo Pèipíng; 9 July 1969 – 6 January 1995) was a 25-year-old female Macau resident executed in Singapore for drug trafficking. After purportedly being recruited to work as a courier for a Hong Kong-based drug trafficking organization, Mou was arrested while in possession of over 5 kilograms of high-quality heroin during a stopover in Singapore's Changi Airport. Despite vehemently protesting her innocence and stating that she was tricked into smuggling narcotics, Mou was found guilty at trial and sentenced to death. The circumstances of her arrest and execution were given wide coverage by the media, with many appeals being made by politicians worldwide for the commutation of her death sentence. However, the appeals, made by the President of Portugal and the Governor of Hong Kong among others, were ignored by the Singaporean authorities. Mou was executed on 6 January 1995.

== Biography ==
Born in Macau in 1969, Mou Pui Peng (who was later nicknamed "Angel") moved to British Hong Kong when she was 2 years old with her mother and younger sister. After dropping out of high school, Mou found various employment as a factory worker and a sales girl, and was working as a cashier the time of her arrest.

== Background ==
In the summer of 1991, Mou asked her 19-year-old sister Mei Mei if she would be willing to carry "something" from Thailand to Taiwan, hidden inside a pair of platform shoes. After she agreed, on 24 July 1991 they went to the Garden Restaurant in Sham Shui Po where they met two men, "Ah Hung" and "Peter". After the men decided they were suitable for the task, the sisters received HK$10,000 each in advance of their HK$50,000 fee for the trip. Ah Hung assured them that many people smuggled things by airplane each year, that everything would work out fine and that even if they were caught all they risked was a few years in prison. Before she left Hong Kong, Mou asked her 55-year-old mother Wong Siu-mui (Chinese: 黃小梅; Jyutping: wong^{4} siu^{2} mui^{4}; pinyin: Huáng xiǎoméi) to pray to protector Buddhist deities in order to rid her of bad luck for her first trip abroad.

On 24 August 1991, after a final meeting with Peter at a restaurant in Jordan district, Mou and her sister caught a China Airlines flight to Bangkok. Ah Hung was waiting for them when they landed, and he then treated the sisters to a few days of sightseeing and shopping. Ah Hung then told them there was a change of plan: instead of high-heeled shoes they would be given false bottomed bags to carry, and that instead of Taiwan they would be going to Singapore and then onto Europe to deliver the goods. Mei Mei later said she thought they would be carrying contraband Rolex wristwatches to Amsterdam. That night, the sisters were split up and moved into different hotels, and the next day Mou was sent on a flight to Singapore.

After learning of Mou's arrest, Ah Hung re-routed Mei Mei's flight to Zürich via Seoul (without informing her of what happened to Angel). Mei Mei only learned of her sister's fate when she arrived back in Hong Kong from Holland and was met at Kai Tak airport by narcotics bureau detectives from the Royal Hong Kong Police.

== Arrest at Changi Airport ==
Mou's bag with the false bottom removed to expose drugs hidden inside

Mou arrived at Changi Airport (to catch an onward flight to Zürich) at around midday on 29 August 1991, where her strange behaviour drew the scrutiny of Customs officer Suriati Mohamed, who was standing less than 20 meters away from Mou at the customs counter green lane. At baggage carousel number 17 on the west wing of Terminal 1, Mou picked up her duffel bag but then hesitated and dropped it, allowing the bag to go around another time before picking it up. Mou was also seen to be taking quick glances at the security arrangements of the different exits. Customs officer Mohamed then silently indicated to her colleague Rosli Brahim via eye contact that Mou had caught her attention. Customs officer Brahim also recognised Mou's bag as a similar type to what Poon Yuen Chung was carrying when she was caught the month before attempting to smuggle narcotics through the same airport.

After Mou put her bag on a luggage trolley and started wheeling it towards the exit of the Arrivals hall, she was stopped by customs officers Brahim and Mohamed, who asked Mou to open her bag for an inspection. Her nervous demeanour raised the suspicion of the officials, and after customs officer Mohamed inspected the bag she realized she could not run her hands down to the very bottom of its inside. Both officers then escorted Mou, who was becoming increasingly agitated, to the Customs Duty office where a more thorough search could be conducted. The officers used a key recovered from Mou to open a padlock on the bag, then the bag was emptied of all its contents and placed on a weighing scale, which showed an unusually heavy weight of 7 kilograms. After cutting through the bag's false bottom, the officers discovered 20 blocks of heroin, weighing approximately a total of 5.5 kilograms (with an estimated street value of $5 million). The plastic packaging of the larger compressed bricks were stamped with the "Double UO Globe" logo, which was known as a trademark of the Khun Sa drug trafficking organization.

Mou was then arrested and handed over to the Central Narcotics Bureau, led by officer Ong Peng Beng. When interrogated by officers at the scene about the narcotics discovered in her luggage, Mou mostly remained silent. However, she did state that the bag was given to her by someone else and she did not know what was inside. Mou was searched and found to have a large amount of cash in various currencies, amounting to $US3,000, HK$5,720, and S$1,055. She was then escorted to Tan Tock Seng Hospital for a medical check up, and afterwards gave a recorded statement to CNB officer Ong via a Cantonese interpreter at about 4:30pm. In her statement, Mou claimed that she paid for the bag at a roadside market in Bangkok and that it was later delivered to her hotel room by the same salesgirl she bought it off, who then helped Mou pack her things into the new bag.

Back in Hong Kong, Mou's mother heard a news report on the radio that a woman of her daughter's age, and with the same surname, had been arrested for drug trafficking in Singapore. Soon after she received a phone call to inform her that it was Mou herself who had been detained. On 30 August 1991, Mou was charged with the importation of the heroin discovered in her bag and then remanded in custody to await trial.

== Trial ==
Singapore customs officer Rosli Brahim and a female colleague removing blocks of heroin from Mou's duffel bag

In the opening statements of Mou's trial at the High Court of Singapore on 2 March 1993, customs officer Rosli Brahim testified how Mou was one of the last passengers to retrieve her bag from the carousel, and appeared nervous by frequently looking at her surroundings, at the customs officers, and at the immigration officers. Customs officer Suriati Mohamed testified that she witnessed Mou looking alternately at the red and green customs channels, as if she was studying how the officers interacted with arriving passengers before making a decision on which channel to walk through. Mou was then stopped by officer Mohamed, who asked for her passport and then told her to open her bag. Suspecting the bag had a false bottom, they escorted her to the Customs Duty office and subsequently discovered the hidden drugs after cutting open the bag. Officer Brahim testified that the bag had a false bottom consisting of a round piece of plywood, which was covered by a thin lining of cloth. This cloth lining was wrapped around the blocks of heroin underneath, and the bottom of the lining was attached to the bottom of the duffle bag itself with a layer of glue.

Mou testified in her defence that she was a part time prostitute who was being paid US$1,000 per day for a long weekend in Bangkok, after which she was instructed by her pimp, a man named "Ah Hung", to visit Singapore to service a client. She claimed Ah Hung bought her a new canvas bag as a gift from a Bangkok market stall, then packed the bag without her knowledge while she was taking a bath in her hotel room, and he also carried the bag and checked it in for her at Don Mueang International Airport. Although Ah Hung was supposed to travel with her, she claimed an urgent matter arose in Bangkok he needed to attend to and he promised to catch a later flight then meet up with her in Singapore. Mou asserted that she had no knowledge of the drugs in her bag before she set off for Singapore. Defence lawyers also stated that the man known as Ah Hung had since been arrested by police in Hong Kong for narcotic offences and that his case was pending trial, a fact they asserted backed up Mou's testimony.

When challenged by Public Prosecutor Ismail Hamid as to why she had failed to mention any of these facts in her initial statement after her arrest, Mou claimed that she did but the recording officer left all those details out for some unknown reason, adding that she wished to disavow the contents of that statement. Mou further claimed that she only realised her statement was seriously lacking in details after it was read out in court, and she would have given a more detailed statement to the authorities before the trial commenced if she had known. In response to furter questioning about a handwritten note found in her possession which included the English words "SQ 46", "SQ28", "SWISS ZURICH", "CENTRAIR", "EUROPEAN TRAIN", "AMSTERDAM", Mou testified that a man named "Hor Fei" had telephoned the Bangkok hotel room while Ah Hung was away. After informing him that Ah Hung was not available he asked her to take a message, and she had scribbled down the words without understanding their meaning. Mou also claimed she was looking around frequently in the arrivals hall of Changi Airport out of curiosity as she had never been in Singapore before, and denied being stopped by the customs officers, insisting that she had voluntarily walked up to the customs desk to offer her bag for inspection.

== Verdict ==
The blocks of heroin Mou was caught with spread out beside her travel bag. The stamped "Double UO Globe" logo is visible on the larger packages.

On 11 March 1993, Mou was found guilty as charged and sentenced to death for importing 4 kilograms of pure heroin into Singapore, contrary to Section 7 of the Misuse of Drugs Act. Trial judge Amarjeet Singh rejected her defence as "not credible". The judge highlighted the fact that Mou had failed to mention in her initial statement after her arrest many arguments she later raised in her defence at her trial, such as Ah Hung's name and her purportedly visiting Singapore to work as a prostitute, for which the judge drew an adverse inference from. Mou had also signed the initial statement after reading it and being offered the chance to make any alterations, which led the court to disregard her allegation it was not recorded correctly. Regarding Mou's claim to have never heard the contents of the initial statement before, the judge asserted that she would have been served a copy of it in remand prison during pre-trial disclosure of evidence, and it was unbelievable she would not have studied it in detail with her defence lawyers well before the beginning of her trial.

The obvious inconsistency of Mou claiming on one hand to be a streetwise high class call girl, yet being so naive and gullible as to be tricked into carrying drugs on behalf of someone else, was also cited as a reason to disbelieve her testimony. In addition, while under cross-examination Mou could not state simple facts such as what hotel she would be staying in, how long she was expected to stay in Singapore, or how much payment she was to receive. Her explanation that the handwritten note with details about connecting flights to Europe, which implied onward travel from Singapore, was in fact ment for Ah Hung was likewise dismissed as untrue. Furthermore, the fact that she claimed Ah Hung packed her bag and to have never carried the bag personally when departing Bangkok inferred that Mou did not want to acknowledge that it was suspiciously heavy for a duffel bag. Correspondingly, the fact that Mou had initially stated that she personally packed her things into the duffel bag in her original statement after her arrest, but then testified in court that Ah Hung alone had packed the bag on her behalf, was viewed by the court as a conscious effort in disassociating herself from handling the bag and thus it being reasonably inferred that Mou was aware that it had a false bottom. The judge was additionally satisfied that Mou's frequent observations of the customs lanes was a result of her nervousness due to carrying illegal narcotics, rather than the inquisitiveness of a novice traveller.

In summary, the court did not believe Mou's version of events regarding visiting Singapore to work as a prostitute, and it was clear to the judge that she was in fact a drug courier who knowingly attempted to smuggle heroin via Changi Airport. Mou remained expressionless when the death sentence was read out and she was escorted from the court by two prison guards, however her younger sister Mei Mei and their mother, who were both watching the trial from the public gallery, broke down into tears when the judge declared that she would be executed by hanging.

== Appeals ==
On 11 July 1994, Mou's appeal against her death sentence was rejected by Singapore's Court of Criminal Appeal. Her lawyer Peter Yap argued that since Mou had walked towards the airport customs officers and opened her bag for an inspection voluntarily, her actions demonstrated she did not have any prior knowledge of any hidden narcotics, which backed up her claim that she was tricked into smuggling heroin. Yap also asserted that oral testimony from a customs officer during her Mou's trial was contradictory and should not have been accepted as admissible evidence, and that conflicting evidence from the Cantonese interpreter and recording officer who took Mou's statements while in custody also undermined the integrity of Mou's conviction.

Although customs officer Suriarti had testified at the original trial that Mou had wheeled her trolley between herself and the green lane counter where customs officer Rosli was standing, she subsequently corrected herself and stated that Mou was in fact on her right hand side when she ordered her to stop, and thus was heading towards the Arrivals hall exit itself. This implied that had she not stopped Mou, she would have walked straight past the officers, and therefore Mou did not voluntarily approach the officers and offer her bag to be checked. The appeal court justified the original trial judge accepting officer Suriarti's evidence, as it was backed up by officer Rosli's testimony and was in any case immaterial to Mou's ultimate conviction.

Regarding conflicting information in Mou's original statement after arrest, while defence lawyers argued that the charge read out to Mou was wrongly interpreted by paraphrasing the word "import" as "bringing (heroin) into" Singapore rather than "trafficking" heroin, the appeal court again found the original trial judge was correct in accepting her statement into evidence, adding that even if it was excluded the remaining prosecution evidence was so overwhelming that Mou would have been unable to rebut the presumption of possession and knowledge of controlled drugs anyway. The Court therefore dismissed all defence arguments of appeal and upheld the original judgment and death sentence.

== Conviction of "Ah Hung" in Hong Kong ==
On 29 November 1993, the man known as "Ah Hung" pled guilty in the Supreme Court of Hong Kong to a charge of assisting people in Hong Kong to commit an offence outside the territory (Section 40 of the Dangerous Drugs Ordinance), the first conviction of its kind for that offence in Hong Kong legal history. Although Deputy Judge Wong queried the consequences of Ah Hung's actions and highlighted the fact that Mou was facing the death penalty in Singapore as a result, defence lawyer Gary Plowman Q.C. asserted the judge could not penalize Ah Hung for crimes committed outside the jurisdiction, but only for the preparatory acts committed in the territory of Hong Kong. Ah Hung, whose legal fees during his trial were estimated at over HK$1.5 million, was later sentenced to 4 1/2 years in prison.

At the time of his arrest, Ah Hung was carrying a passport issued by Malaysia bearing the name of 'Sia Khim Meng' and claimed to be a 29-year-old furniture factory owner residing in Thailand. However, this was proven to be false after inquiries revealed that the passport itself was reported missing to the Thai authorities by its true owner months before Mou's arrest. Ah Hung, whose real name was never confirmed but was known to other inmates at Stanley Prison as "Huiang Xingwang" (Chinese: 辉昂兴旺; Jyutping: Fai^{1}ngong^{4} Hing^{1}wong^{6}; pinyin: Huīáng Xīngwàng), was subsequently identified as a Chinese citizen.

Mei Mei testified as the principal witness against Ah Hung during his trial, identifying him as the syndicate member who packed the sisters' bags with heroin. Mei Mei had previously asserted in statements made to Hong Kong police detectives that her and Mou had thought the bags contained stolen Rolex watches, and had been tricked into carrying narcotics. Despite this, Mei Mei had written a letter to him pleading he inform Singaporean authorities that Mou was unaware of what was hidden by him in her bag. However, the letter was returned unopened and Ah Hung refused all attempts by Mou's family to communicate. Ah Hung was eventually released from prison on 10 October 1994 and then deported to China.

== Execution ==
"Accept my fate. Some things are just meant to be. It's destiny. We have to accept reality, Mei-Mei. Death comes to us all sooner or later."

— Excerpt of letter sent by Angel Mou Pui Peng to her younger sister while she was on death row (August 1994)

In early December 1994, after a final plea for clemency was rejected by President of Singapore Ong Teng Cheong and with all legal processes for appeal exhausted, a death warrant was finalized and sent to Mou's family in Hong Kong. They were notified via telegram from the superintendent of Changi Prison that the execution would take place a week later on 23 December 1994. Mou was scheduled to be executed alongside Singaporean drug offenders Leong Wing Kong and Lim Choon Chye, however her lawyers filed an application for a stay of execution so her family could visit her in prison and celebrate Christmas with her one final time before she could be put to death(Mou had converted to Christianity while on death row).

The request was granted on 22 December 1994 by President Ong Teng Cheong, who had earlier rejected Mou's plea for clemency two weeks prior to the original date of her execution. Upon learning Mou's family had difficulty raising money for the journey to Singapore, the manager of Hinrichs Travel Services offered two return tickets free of charge, while The Indian Resources Group donated HK$10,000 towards the total cost.

On 30 December 1994, Mou's mother received another telegram in Hong Kong from the authorities in Singapore, informing her that Mou's execution would take place the following week. The telegram also said the family would be allowed to visit her three days before the scheduled hanging and could claim Mou's body after the death sentence had been carried out. Amnesty International, who had earlier organized a clemency campaign on Mou's behalf, then urgently appealed for members of the public to fax petitions to both the President of Singapore and the Prime Minister of Singapore for Mou's temporary reprieve to be made permanent and her death sentence to be commuted. Mou was visited on death row by her lawyer Peter Yap the day before she was brought to the gallows, who described her as being calm, emotionally stable and spiritually prepared for her impending execution.

Shortly before dawn on the morning of 6 January 1995, after a two-week stay of execution and rescheduling of her death sentence, 25-year-old Angel Mou Pui Peng was hanged at Changi Prison. A few hours after her execution, Mou was cremated following a funeral service attended by her sister Mei Mei and their father.

== International reaction ==
Protest on the day before Mou's execution, at the Ruins of Saint Paul's in Santo Antonio, Macau

Mou's case was given wide coverage by the Portuguese media (as she was a Portuguese citizen by birth in a colonial territory), with frequent daily updates on both television and radio in the lead up to her execution. Many appeals were previously made by politicians worldwide for the commutation of Mou's death sentence, including a landmark intervention by President of Portugal Mário Soares, along with similar diplomatic efforts from the Portuguese Minister of Foreign Affairs José Manuel Barroso and the Governor of Hong Kong Chris Patten. The governor of Macau, Vasco Rocha Vieira, condemned Mou's execution as "incomprehensible and even revolting" while also expressing "deep sorrow" at Mou's death and feelings of "solidarity" with her family, while Chris Patten was quoted as saying he "deeply regrets the death penalty anywhere" and that he wished to express "deep sympathy and condolences" to Mou's family in Hong Kong. In an effort to gain clemency, Portugal's ambassador to Singapore, Sebastiao De Castello Branco, had previously described Mou as being "so poorly educated that she could not grasp the seriousness of the crime of drug smuggling".

== See also ==
- Capital punishment for drug trafficking
- Capital punishment in Singapore
