= Capital punishment in China =

Capital punishment is a legal penalty in the People's Republic of China. It is applicable to offenses ranging from murder to drug trafficking. Executions are carried out by lethal injection or by shooting. A survey conducted by The New York Times in 2014 found the death penalty retained widespread support in Chinese society.

According to Amnesty International, China executes more people than all other countries combined. The exact numbers of executions and death sentences remain state secrets. According to the U.S.-based Dui Hua Foundation, the estimated number of executions has declined steadily in the twenty-first century, from 12,000 each year to 2,400. However, in 2022, the World Coalition Against the Death Penalty announced that since 2007 at least 8,000 people per year were executed in China. Since 2006, the Chinese government has taken measures to limit the use of the death penalty for certain crimes.

Capital punishment in China should not be confused with death sentence with reprieve, a form of lenient sentencing handed down by Chinese courts as frequently as, or more often than, actual death sentences. The death sentence with reprieve is used to emphasize the seriousness of the crime and the mercy of the court, and is sometimes inaccurately added to the number of actual death sentences.

== Historical background ==
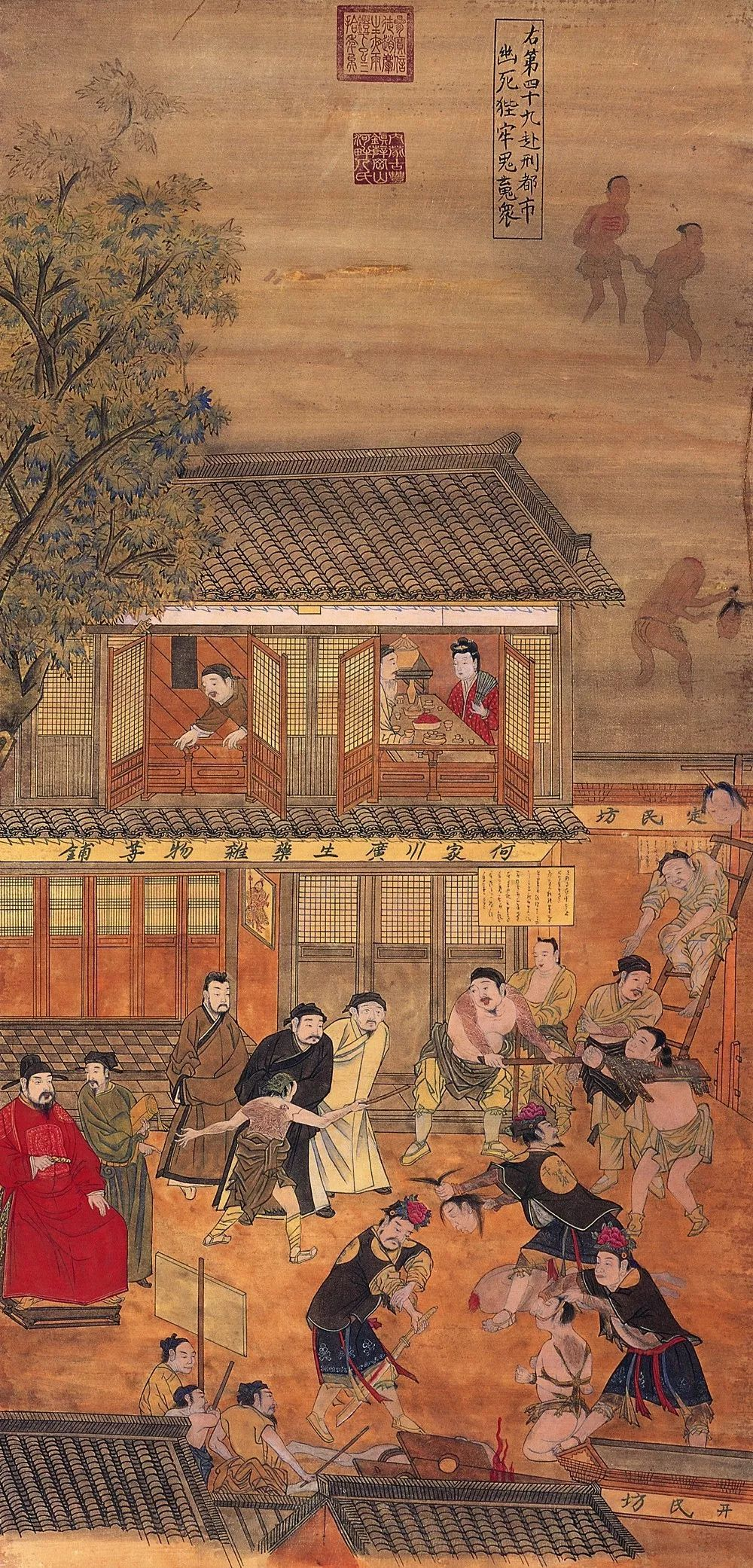
Ming dynasty Shuilu ritual painting depicting imprisonment and execution.

Capital punishment was one of the classical Five Punishments of China's dynastic period. In Chinese philosophy, capital punishment was supported by the Legalists, but its application was tempered by the Confucians, who preferred rehabilitation and mercy. Confucius did not oppose capital punishment absolutely, but did take the view that in a well-ordered society based on moral persuasion, capital punishment would become unnecessary.

During China's early dynasties, capital punishment and amputation were predominant among the five punishments. Later, amputation became less common, but capital punishment and corporal punishment remained. There was wide variability in the number of types of capital offenses over time. Under the Punishments of Lu (Lu Xing), written sometime in the Warring States period (475–221 BCE), there were 200 capital offenses. The Tang Code (653 CE) listed 233 capital offenses, and the Song dynasty (960–1279) retained these and added sixty more over time. Under the Yuan dynasty, the "number of separate capital provisions" precipitously dropped, reaching a low of 125 crimes. The number of capital offenses spiked again under the Ming dynasty (1368–1644), with 282 capital offenses, and the Qing dynasty (1644–1911), with more than 800 capital offenses.

Historically, poorer and lower-status Chinese were most often subject to capital punishment; however, officials and others of high rank were put to death as a means of social control in times of war, internal disarray, or strife. For example, King Wu of the Western Zhou ordered officials who violated royal regulations, failed to carry out their duties, or "promulgated innovations" to be put to death; 39 military officials were executed following a peasant uprising during the Tang dynasty; the six gentlemen of the Hundred Days' Reform, who advocated social reform in the late Qing dynasty were executed.

The first type of classical punishment was a system of torture used in the process of examining a criminal. Examining a criminal by torture began in the Qin dynasty when judges, after a preliminary hearing and investigation, used bambooing and bastinado to force the offender to admit to committing the crime. Second, there was a system of collective responsibility initiated by Duke Wen of the State of Qin; under that system, when a criminal was sentenced to death, other family members above a certain age were also sentenced to death. This included the wife's family or siblings' families. At some point, even the families of a man's concubines were also killed. Thirdly, there was a system of revenge based on the Confucian philosophy centered around filial piety. The right to seek retribution was codified in the Legal Code of the Qing dynasty (1644–1911), which describes the legal proceedings and punishments for family members who seek revenge and kill the murderer of their relatives. The fourth type of punishment system was structured according to booty, loot, and spoil. Following conviction of these crimes, the punishment ranged from fifty strokes of the cane or death by hanging. Finally, the fifth classical punishment was a system advocating amnesty, probation, and parole. However, this system of punishment was not practiced often because the Chinese legal system asserted a retributive theory of punishment.

== Rates of execution ==
By both confirmed and estimated data, the number of executions from capital punishment in China is far higher than in any other country, while the number per capita is comparable to Vietnam and Singapore, and lower than several other countries, including Saudi Arabia, Iran and Iraq. The number of executions has dropped steadily in the 2000s, and significantly since 2007, when the Supreme People's Court regained the power to review all death sentences; for instance, the Dui Hua Foundation estimates that China executed 12,000 people in 2002, 6,500 people in 2007, and roughly 2,400 in 2013 and 2014. Given conservative and variable estimates of executions in China, executions in China account for more than 58% in 2009 and 65% in 2010 of those worldwide.

The exact number of people executed in China is classified as a state secret; occasionally, death penalty cases are posted publicly by the judiciary, as in certain high-profile cases. One such example was the execution of former State Food and Drug Administration director Zheng Xiaoyu, which was confirmed by both state television and the official Xinhua News Agency. Other media, such as Internet message boards, have become outlets for confirming death penalty cases, usually after a sentence has been carried out.

Due to the inaccessibility of official statistics, academic researchers must use data compiled by non-governmental organizations (NGOs) such as Amnesty International, the most cited source of reports regarding execution statistics. In 2009, Amnesty International counted 1718 executions as having taken place during 2008 (which equates to 0.0001%, or 1 in 1,000,000 of the Chinese population). Amnesty International believed that the total figure was likely to be much higher. According to "The Death Penalty in China: Reforms and Its Future", "it also represents the most conservative estimate of death sentences and executions in China due to the following accounting rules: 1) when there is doubt of accuracy, figures were excluded; 2) where two conflicting reports existed, the lower figure was used; 3) when a combined figure of death sentences and prison sentences was given, only one death sentence was recorded; and 4) when a group was sentenced to death, only one sentence was entered."

== Legal procedure ==
After a first trial conducted by an intermediate people's court concludes with a death sentence, a double appeals process must follow. The first appeal is conducted by a high people's court if the condemned appealed to it, and since 2007, another appeal is conducted automatically (even if the condemned waived the first appeal) by the Supreme People's Court of the People's Republic of China (SPC) in Beijing, to prevent incidents where a defendant is proven innocent after their execution.

When a case involving the death penalty is sent to the SPC for mandatory review, the case is delivered to one of the court's five divisions according to the geographic origin of the case or, in some cases, the type of crime involved. The SPC's second criminal division is dedicated to handling reviews of some of the most sensitive cases. Each case is then assigned to a panel of three judges, one of whom is designated as the principal case manager. Since 2012, judges have also been required to interview defendants before deciding whether or not to approve a death sentence. The judges write reports summarizing the case, discuss the case, and then report the decision to the division head, SPC vice president, and finally the SPC president.

If the lower court death sentence is upheld, the execution is carried out shortly thereafter. As a result of its reforms, the PRC government claims, the Supreme People's Court overturned about 15 percent of the death sentences handed down by high courts in the first half of 2008. In a brief report in May 2008, Xinhua quoted anonymous sources as saying Chinese courts handed down 30 percent fewer death sentences in 2007 than in 2006.

The cases of Li Yan (2014) and Wu Ying (2012) are two examples in which the Supreme People's Court reversed a death sentence pronounced by lower courts.

Chinese courts hand down the sentence of "death sentence with two years' probation" (Chinese: 死缓; pinyin: sǐ huǎn) as frequently as, or more often than, they do actual death sentences. This unique sentence is used to emphasize the seriousness of the crime and the mercy of the court, and has a centuries-old history in Chinese jurisprudence. It is almost always reduced to life or 10 to 15 years imprisonment if no new crime is intentionally committed during the two-year probationary period.

Article 49 in the Chinese criminal code explicitly forbids the death penalty for offenders below the age of 18 at the time of the crime. The SPC also issued a policy in 2007 which required lower courts to arrange for the visitation of condemned criminals by relatives, forbade local authorities from parading prisoners on death row, and required that executions be publicly announced.

However, capital punishment in China can be subject to political or social influence. In 2003, a local court sentenced the leader of a triad society to a death sentence with two years of probation. However, the public opinion was that the sentence was too light. Under public pressure, the Supreme People's Court took the case and retried the leader, resulting in a death sentence which was carried out immediately.

Since 1980, the state's security apparatus has initiated various "strike hard" (Chinese: 严打; pinyin: Yándǎ) campaigns against specific types of crime. Critics have noted that the campaigns lead to the streamlining of capital cases, where cases are investigated, appeals heard, and sentences carried out at rates much more rapid than normal. Since 2006, Chinese Supreme Court justice Xiao Yang has worked to blunt the "strike hard" policy with his own policy of "balancing leniency and severity" (Chinese: 宽严相济; pinyin: Kuānyán Xiāngjì), which is supposedly influenced by Hu Jintao's harmonious society concept. Xiao's policy includes improving the quality of appeals by mandating that the SPC, rather than simply the high people's court, review capital crime cases; increasing use of the "death sentence with two years' probation"; and requiring "clear facts" and "abundant evidence" for capital cases.

The abolition of the death penalty in Hong Kong since 1993 is a major reason why China does not have a rendition agreement with that city. Since April 2019, a proposed extradition bill has sparked massive protests.

The list of capital crimes includes crimes endangering national security, such as organizing an "armed mass rebellion"; endangerment of public security, such as committing arson; and crimes against the person, such as the rape of a person under the age of 14. During the 1980s, "economic crimes" such as bribery, drug trafficking, and embezzlement were added to the legal code. Capital punishment in China can be imposed on crimes against national symbols and treasures, such as theft of cultural relics and (before 1997) the killing of giant pandas. Executions under the pretense of political crimes are extremely rare and confined to persons involved in violence or the threat of violence.

Thirteen crimes were removed from the list of capital offenses in 2011, including the smuggling of cultural relics, wildlife products, and precious metals. This brought the total number of capital offenses down from 68 to 55, though many of the crimes dropped from the list were rarely, if ever, punished with the death penalty. The Draft 9th Amendment to the PRC Criminal Law was passed on 29 August 2015, removing nine additional crimes from the list of capital offenses. The crimes that were removed were:

- Smuggling weapons or ammunition
- Smuggling nuclear materials
- Smuggling counterfeit money
- Counterfeiting
- Investment fraud/fraudulent fundraising
- Organizing prostitution
- Forcing prostitution
- Obstructing military affairs
- Spreading rumors and undermining morale during wartime

== Execution procedure ==
The execution protocol is defined in the criminal procedure law, under article 252:

- Before a people's court executes a death sentence, it shall notify the people's procuratorate at the same level to send personnel to supervise the execution.
- Death sentences shall be executed by means of shooting or injection.
- Death sentences may be executed at the execution ground or in designated places of custody.
- The judicial personnel directing the execution shall verify the identity of the criminal offender, ask him if he has any last words or letters, and then deliver him to the executioner for the death sentence. If, before the execution, it is found that there may be an error, the execution shall be suspended and the matter shall be reported to the Supreme People's Court for decision.
- Execution of death sentences shall be announced to the public, but shall not be held in public.
- The attending court clerk shall, after the execution of a death sentence, make a written record thereon. The people's court that caused the death sentence to be executed shall submit a report on the execution to the Supreme People's Court.
- The people's court that caused the death sentence to be executed shall, after the execution, notify the family of the criminal offender.

In Beijing, the execution ground is located on a hillside next to Jingyuan Road, near Yingshangzui Park in Mentougou. It's a compound with a sign on the gate reading "Beijing Supreme People's Court Project 86". It has become redundant since lethal injection was introduced.

=== Execution ground ===
In most parts of China, there is no specific execution ground. A scout team chooses a place in advance to serve as the execution ground. In such case, the execution ground normally will have three perimeters:

- The innermost 50 meters is the responsibility of the execution team;
- The 200-meter radius from the center is the responsibility of the People's Armed Police;
- The 2 km alert line is the responsibility of the local police.

The public is generally not allowed to view the execution. The role of the executioner was fulfilled in the past by the People's Armed Police soldiers. In recent times, the judicial police officers of the People's Courts (Chinese: 法警; pinyin: fǎjǐng) assumed this role.

China commonly employs two methods of execution. Since 1949, the most common method has been execution by firing squad, which has been largely superseded by lethal injection, using the same three-drug cocktail pioneered by the United States, introduced in 1996.

=== Execution van ===
Execution vans are unique to China. Lethal injection is more commonly used for "economic crimes", such as corruption, while firing squads are used for more common crimes like murder. In 2010, Chinese authorities moved to have lethal injection become the dominant form of execution; in some provinces and municipalities, it is now the only legal form of capital punishment. However, the method of execution is rarely specified in published reports, according to the Dui Hua Foundation.

== Reform ==
Chinese authorities have recently been pursuing measures to reduce the number of crimes punishable by death, and limit how often the death penalty is utilized.

In 1996, the government made lethal injection a legal method of execution. The Supreme People's Court distributed the execution kits, developed by the China Academy of Medical Science Pharmaceutical Institute, and the first experiments occurred in 1997. The same year, China banned suspended capital punishment for juvenile offenders. Before then, 16-year-olds and 17-year-olds could be sentenced to death for particularly heinous crimes, although the law mandated that the death sentence be suspended and only be carried out when the juvenile had resisted any and all efforts to reform them. However, several more juvenile offenders were executed after this law was passed. In 2003, 18-year-old Zhao Lin was executed for a murder committed in 2000, when he was sixteen.

Since 2006, under global pressures, China has embarked on significant reforms of the death penalty system. In 2011, China abolished the death penalty for 13 crimes in Amendment VIII to the Criminal Law of PRC, which was the most important amendment passed since 1997. The National People's Congress Standing Committee adopted an amendment to reduce the number of capital crimes from 68 to 55. According to "The Death Penalty in China: Reforms and Its Future", the 13 crimes (19% of the total number of crimes punishable through death) were: "smuggling of cultural relics; smuggling of precious metals; smuggling of precious animals or their products; smuggling of ordinary freight and goods; fraud connected with negotiable instruments; fraud connected with financial instruments; fraud connected with letters of credit; false invoicing for tax purposes; forging and selling value-added tax invoices; larceny; instructing in criminal methods; excavating and robbing ancient cultural sites or ancient tombs, and excavating and robbing fossil hominids and fossil vertebrate animals".

In addition to decreasing the number of capital offenses, Article 3 of Amendment VIII states that seniors aged 75 years old and older should only be sentenced to death when they have caused the death of another person by cruel and unusual means. Article 1 states that seniors aged 75 or older who have committed crimes may be given lighter sentences. For those seniors who have committed crimes of negligence, their sentences can be lighter or mitigated. In addition, Article 19 dictates that criminals less than 18 years old at the time of a crime who are sentenced to prison terms of less than five years do not have to report to jail in situations of army recruitment and employment. Later the same year, the Supreme People's Court ordered lower courts to suspend death sentences for two years and to "ensure that it only applies to a very small minority of criminals committing extremely serious crimes". This series of actions is thought of as marking the beginning of China's tentative start toward completely abolishing the death penalty. While many critics are skeptical of Amendment VIII bringing long-term change, the reforms represent a gradual transition towards greater state respect and protection of human rights.

In practice, China traditionally uses the firing squad as its standard method of execution. However, in recent years, China has adopted lethal injection as its sole method of execution, though execution by firing squad can still be administered.

=== Key reforms since 2006 ===
- Notice Improving Work on Open Trial for Second Instance Case with Death Sentences (7 December 2005)
- Provisions on Some Issues Concerning the Court Trial Procedures for the Second Instance of Cases Involving the Death Penalty (for Trial Implementation) (21 September 2006)
- Amendment to the Organic Law of the People's Court (31 October 2006)
- Provision of the SPC on Several Issues Concerning the Review of Death Penalty Cases (27 February 2007)
- Opinion on Strengthening Handling Cases in Strict Accordance with Law and Guaranteeing the Quality of Handling Death Penalty Cases (9 March 2007)
- Provisions Concerning Issues in Examination of Evidence in Handling Death Penalty Cases (13 June 2010)
- Regulation on Issues Concerning Exclusion of Illegal Evidence in Handling Criminal Cases (13 June 2010)

=== Key changes since reforms in 2006 ===
- Exercise of the death penalty in general – After changes, the reform officially stated the principle of killing fewer and cautiously.
- Death Penalty (immediate execution) cases review body – SPC reassumes power to review immediate execution cases.
- Decisions on a wrongful conviction/sentence – SPC can order a lower court to retry a case except in a few scenarios.
- Questioning of convicted person during review – In principle, SPC judges should question the convicted person.
- Open trial during appeal – In cases that may result in immediate execution, there must be an open trial.
- Exclusion of illegal evidence – Evidence that is not acquired through legal means, like confessions obtained through torture must be excluded.

In March 2007, China's representative in the UN Human Rights Council, La Yifan stated that "the death penalty's scope of application was to be reviewed shortly, and it was expected that this scope would be reduced, with the final aim to abolish it." During the same year, the Supreme People's Court assumed the power to review every death sentence handed down by a lower court. Since this reform, it has been rumored that the number of executions has at least halved. In February 2011, capital punishment in China was abolished for 13 non-violent crimes and it was also banned for offenders over the age of 75.

In 2024, China issued the Guidelines on Imposing Criminal Punishments on Diehard "Taiwan independence" Separatists for Conducting or Inciting Secession, which states that supporters of Taiwanese independence, regardless of their location, can be tried in absentia and sentenced to death by Chinese courts.

== Support ==
Capital punishment has widespread support in China, especially for violent crimes, and no group in government or civil society has vocally advocated for its abolition except some that are based in Europe. Surveys conducted by the Chinese Academy of Social Sciences in 1995, for instance, found that 95% of the Chinese population supported the death penalty, and these results were mirrored in other studies. A poll conducted in 2002, showed that 88% of the population are in favour of the death penalty. In 2005, a survey of 2000 respondents showed that 82.1% supported the death penalty while 13.7% supported the abolishment of the death penalty. Polling conducted by the Dui Hua Foundation in 2007 in Beijing, Hunan and Guangdong found a more moderate 58% in favor of the death penalty, and further found that a majority (63.8%) believed that the government should release execution statistics to the public.

A survey conducted in 2008 by the Max Planck Institute showed that 60% of survey respondents in Beijing, Hubei, and Guangdong supported capital punishment. In the past, however, the public has expressed few dissenting opinions. Reducing or abolishing the use of capital punishment has become a topic of open discussion in recent years. A survey conducted by the Institute of Social Science Survey of Peking University in 2014 showed that 68% of the Chinese people supported the death penalty, and respondents with higher education were more likely to be supportive of capital punishment.

== Criticism ==
=== International criticism ===
Because of the wide application of capital offenses in Chinese criminal law, substantial use of capital punishment, and the hidden numbers of the execution rate, the Chinese death penalty system has been criticized by many international organizations, which make an appeal to ethics and human rights, without always being well informed about the historical and cultural conditions in China. A foreign reporter stated, "China's enthusiasm for capital punishment has long been a target for international criticism of its human rights record." Most of the international criticism stems from the wide scope of capital offenses and the amnesty system.

Amnesty International reports that, until 2010, among 197 nations worldwide, 96 nations had completely abolished the death penalty, 9 had abolished the death penalty for ordinary crimes, and 34 were abolitionist in practice, meaning that they have not executed anyone for at least 10 years and have generally settled on the policy to not sentence anyone to execution. The last wave of international death penalty abolition has been influenced by the process of democratization and has inspired constitutions that protect the right to life. China has ratified more than 200 international covenants in recent decades and has taken on international responsibilities like respecting the right to life and thus limiting the use of capital punishment. When a draft of the Amendment was published in 2010, a foreign reporter commented, "it is believed that the proposed amendment is one of several moves by the Chinese government to soften its image as the world's biggest executioner."

According to an Amnesty International report, "available information indicates that thousands of people are executed and sentenced to death in China each year." Human rights groups and foreign governments have criticized China's use of the death penalty for a variety of reasons, including its application for non-violent offenses, allegations of the use of torture to extract confessions, legal proceedings that do not meet international standards, and the government's refusal to publish statistics on the death penalty. However, the vast majority of death sentences, as acknowledged by both the Chinese Supreme Court and the United States Department of State, are given for violent, nonpolitical crimes which would be considered serious in other countries.

International death penalty abolitionist norms and trends have shaped Chinese death penalty practices significantly in recent years. Through international interventions and policies, like the European Union-led campaign against the death penalty in China since the mid-2000s, there has been an increased exchange of anti-death penalty knowledge and ideologies, the dissemination of original information, and legislation geared towards scaling down the wide application of the death penalty.

=== Allegation made by Falun Gong ===
The Coalition to Investigate the Persecution of Falun Gong has accused Chinese hospitals of using the organs of executed prisoners for commercial transplantation. Under Chinese law, condemned prisoners must give written consent to become organ donors, but Wang Guoqi, a Chinese dissident and former PLA physician, has claimed that because of this and other legal restrictions an international black market in organs and cadavers from China has developed. In December 2005, China's deputy health minister Huang Jiefu admitted that the country harvested organs from executed prisoners. In 2009, Chinese authorities acknowledged that two-thirds of organ transplants in the country could be traced back to executed prisoners and announced a crackdown on the practice.

The Australian Refugee Review Tribunal and the Laogai Research Foundation, an NGO specialising in gathering information on human rights in Chinese prisons, investigated the claims made by Falun Gong by sending undercover investigators to Chinese hospitals, prisons, and military camps. However, they were unable to find any evidence that organs were extracted against people's will, and concluded that:

1) According to our investigation in China, the alleged concentration camp that locks up as many as 6,000 people does not exist in Sujiatun District; 2) over the past two decades, the Chinese government did harvest organs from death row prisoners, but neither in theory or in practice [is it possible] to conduct the operation to crop organs alive from as many as 4,500 people; 3) the report that "the CCP crops organs from the Falun Gong practitioners and exports them to Thailand and other countries" is totally unreliable.

— Harry Wu, RRT Research Response (CHN31249), Refugee Review Tribunal & Laogai Research Foundation

The investigators also tried to contact Falun Gong spokespeople and witnesses, but were either ignored or not provided with any evidence, causing the investigators to conclude that the witnesses "most probably had fabricated the story".

== See also ==
- Death sentence with reprieve, an alternative of the capital punishment which potentially changes the penalty from death to life or limited term of imprisonment after 2 years of the conviction.
- Crime in China
- Law of China
- Capital punishment in Taiwan
- Capital punishment in Hong Kong
- Capital punishment in Macau
