= Human rights in Macau =

Human rights in Macau refers to the basic rights of citizens of Macau, a former Portuguese colony that reverted to Chinese administration in 1999. As a Special Administrative Region (SAR) of the People's Republic of China (PRC), Macau enjoys a high degree of autonomy, except in defence and foreign affairs, and its citizens have basic freedoms and enjoy legally protected rights. The Macau Basic Law is the SAR's constitution, promulgated by PRC's National People's Congress (NPC) in 1993.

Macau continues to be perceived to enjoy a high level of civil liberties. The 1987 Sino-Portuguese Joint Declaration and the Basic Law specify that the SAR is to continue to enjoy substantial autonomy and its economic system and way of life are to remain unchanged for the first 50 years under PRC sovereignty. The government is led by a chief executive, chosen by a 300-member election committee, which, in turn, is chosen by a preparatory committee composed of 60 SAR and 40 mainland representatives appointed by the NPC.
