= Dependent territories of the United Kingdom =

Overview of British dependencies

Map of the dependent territories. The British Overseas Territories in red, Crown Dependencies in blue, and the United Kingdom in green.

The United Kingdom has two forms of dependent territories; the Crown Dependencies and the British Overseas Territories. As dependencies, they are not part of the UK proper, but nor are they independent states. Each has its own distinct legally defined relationship with the UK, with the monarchy of the United Kingdom as head of state. The remaining Crown colonies of the British Empire were renamed "British Dependent Territories" from 1 January 1983 under the British Nationality Act 1981, and were renamed again on 26 February 2002 to "British Overseas Territories" by the British Overseas Territories Act 2002. With the 2002 act phasing out use of the term "dependent territory", following consultations with the territories, classing it and the term "colonies", as "outdated".

== British Overseas Territories ==
These former parts of the British Empire are not part of the UK proper, but the British crown and parliament has full sovereignty over each. They have varying degrees of delegated internal self-governance. The UK counts a total of 14 such territories. This includes the UK's view that its Antarctic claim is a dependency, though internationally its legal status is governed by the Antarctic Treaty.

- Anguilla
- Bermuda
- British Antarctic Territory – Antarctic claim
- British Indian Ocean Territory – military base
- British Virgin Islands
- Cayman Islands
- Falkland Islands
- Gibraltar
- Montserrat
- Pitcairn Islands
- Saint Helena, Ascension and Tristan da Cunha
  - Saint Helena
  - Ascension Island
  - Tristan da Cunha
- South Georgia and the South Sandwich Islands – uninhabited island
- Sovereign Base Areas of Akrotiri and Dhekelia in Cyprus – military bases
- Turks and Caicos Islands

== Crown Dependencies ==
The Crown Dependencies are self-governing possessions of the British Crown with their own legislative assemblies. They were not part of the British Empire, but have a much older relationship as subjects of the English Crown.

- Bailiwick of Guernsey
- Bailiwick of Jersey
- Isle of Man

== See also ==
- Commonwealth of Nations – former parts of the British Empire which are now fully independent countries, many now republics.
- Commonwealth realms – those of the above countries which retain the same monarch as the United Kingdom.
- Crown colony – an obsolete term for the Overseas Territories, and historically many others with a similar status.

== Sources ==
- Great Britain (2012). The Overseas Territories: Security, Success and Sustainability. Cm (Series) (Great Britain. Parliament). Stationery Office. ISBN 978-0-10-183742-2.
