= Execution of Tong Ching Man =

24 year old female Hong Konger executed in Singapore for heroin trafficking in 1995

Tong Ching Man
- 唐清雯
- Tong after her arrest in 1988
- Born: 17 October 1970; British Hong Kong
- Died: 21 April 1995 (aged 24); Changi Prison, Singapore
- Cause of death: Execution by hanging
- Citizenship: British Dependent Territories citizen
- Occupation: Waitress
- Conviction: Drug trafficking
- Penalty: Death

Chinese name
- Chinese: 唐清雯
- Hanyu Pinyin: Táng Qīngwén
- Jyutping: tong^{4} cing^{1} man^{4}

Tong Ching Man (Chinese: 唐清雯; Jyutping: tong^{4} cing^{1} man^{4}; 17 October 1970 – 21 April 1995) was a 24 year old female Hong Kong resident executed in Singapore for drug trafficking.

After purportedly being recruited to work as a drug courier by her boyfriend, Tong was arrested while in possession of over 2 kilograms of high-quality heroin during a stopover in Singapore's Changi Airport.

Despite vehemently protesting her innocence and stating that she was tricked into smuggling narcotics, Tong was found guilty at trial and sentenced to death. Despite appeals being made for the commutation of her death sentence, the Singaporean authorities were ultimately undeterred by pleas for clemency from the British Government.

== Biography ==
Born in British Hong Kong in 1970, Tong Ching Man has been described as coming from a broken family. Tong's mother left her father (who worked as a car parking attendant in Tsim Sha Tsui) and married another man, after which Tong went to live with her father, her new step-mother and two half-brothers in Hunghom. At the age of 14, Tong dropped out of school and ran away from home, and was living with two friends in an apartment while working as a waitress at the time of her arrest.

== Arrest at Changi Airport ==
On 15 December 1988, Tong and her 19-year-old fellow Hong Konger accomplice Lam Cheuk Wang (Chinese: 林灼宏; Jyutping: lam^{4} coek^{3} wang^{4}; pinyin: Línzhuóhóng) from Tsing Yi flew into Singapore's Changi Airport from Hong Kong at 8:30pm and were due to catch a connecting Singapore Airlines flight to Brussels at 10pm that evening. They both wore large puffy jackets on top of their clothes, partly to protect against the cold winter weather of their final destination but mainly to disguise how bulky their torsos looked. After their plane taxied to a remote part of the airport, a bus picked up the passengers and then brought them to the west wing of Terminal One, where they were then given new boarding passes and directed to the specific boarding areas for their connecting flights.

At 9:15pm, narcotics officers decided to mount a surprise check of the passengers boarding the flight to Brussels, and started searching people at random at the boarding gate (Gate B26). Lam's restless behavior caught the attention of the officials and he was then frisked. Lam was found to have 24 bags containing a total of 2.5 kg of a powder like substance, later determined to be heroin, strapped to his body in a nylon vest. A one meter long blue rubber cloth had been wound round his torso and fastened with velcro in an effort to flatten the vest. Knowing from previous experience that drug couriers often worked in pairs, the officers decided to conduct a thorough search of all the other passengers queuing for the flight. Tong was searched about 25 minutes later, and she was found to have 18 bags containing a total of 2.3 kg of heroin strapped to her torso in a similar manner. Tong was also found to be carrying a large amount of cash in various currencies, amounting to $US1,000 and HK$920.

At 5am on the morning of 16 December 1988, Central Narcotics Bureau officer Teo Chin Seng attempted to interrogate Lam via a Cantonese interpreter, however he exercised his right to silence and refused to answer any questions. At 5:20am, officer Teo took a recorded statement from Tong, where she said Lam had asked her to strap the packages to her body before they took off from Kai Tak Airport and she only realized they contained heroin after she was searched by the officers in Singapore.

On 17 December 1988, Tong and Lam were charged with trafficking a total of 4.8 kg of heroin, worth an estimated $5 million, into Singapore and both were then remanded in custody to await trial.

Central Narcotics Bureau officers reenacting how Tong Ching Man and Lam Cheuk Wang had blocks of heroin strapped to their bodies in custom vests

== Trial ==
The trial of Tong and Lam for trafficking a capital amount of narcotics began on 12 August 1993 at the High Court of Singapore. Although the authorities had directed both face a joint trial, Defence lawyers for Lam argued that they should have separate trials, due to the disparity in weight and purity of the heroin he was charged with smuggling compared to Tong (who was caught with the equivalent of almost a quarter of a kilogram more than Lam). However, the trial judge dismissed the application and ruled that both defendants should be tried jointly as originally planned.

Deputy Public Prosecutor Palaniappan Sundararaj thereafter outlined how Tong had 1.67 kg and Lam had 1.46 kg of pure heroin respectively in their possession when they were searched by officials at Changi Airport during a surprise inspection while waiting on their flight to Brussles on the day in question. At the close of the prosecution case, both defense teams submitted their clients had no case to answer and applied for an acquittal. However, the trial judge rejected the acquittal requests and declared that prima facie evidence had been established against both Tong and Lam, and called on them to make their defence against the charges they faced.

Lam's defence was he was asked to carry blocks of tranquillizers to Belgium by a man named "Ah Keung" in order to avoid paying custom duties then sell on the grey market, and would be paid a fee of HK$15,000 for doing so. After receiving the vest with the sown-in packages from Ah Keung, he was instructed to take a taxi to the airport where another person would be waiting for him, and that's where he met Tong for the first time. He did not realize the flight had a stop over in Singapore, therefore there was no intent to actually import it.

Despite Lam testifying that he first met her at Kai Tak airport just before they flew out, Tong stated that he was in fact her boyfriend. They had been in a relationship since July 1988, and in late October 1988 he invited her to go on holiday with him to Belgium. Lam told her he would make all the arrangements and pay all the expenses, she only needed to give him her newly issued passport and bring winter clothing. At the airport in Hong Kong, he gave her a vest to put on, telling her the contents were not dangerous and they were only trying to evade taxes and import duties. Tong testified that Lam also gave her US$1,000 in cash as spending money for when they arrived in Belgium. Regarding the drugs she was caught with, Tong claimed to have never even seen heroin before, and when asked to clarify how traces of opioids were found in a urine sample she gave shortly after her arrest, she explained that she was prescribed a cough medicine in Hong Kong that may have contained codeine.

The Prosecution countered that when Lam was interrogated by officers shortly after his arrest about the items strapped to his body, he replied it was "pak fun", which the literal translation from Cantonese is "white powder" but in Hong Kong is the slang term for heroin, coupled with that fact he had seen before boarding the plane that the bags contained a substance that was white and lumpy indicated that he knew it was not tranquilizers. The Prosecution also dismissed Tong's claim of innocence by questioning why an 18 year old waitress from Hong Kong (who had never even applied for a passport before) would suddenly decide to go on a vacation to Belgium for only 3 days, whereas a more likely explanation pointed to her intentionally working as a drug mule instead.

== Verdict ==
On 19 August 1993, Tong and Lam were both found guilty as charged and sentenced to death for importing 3 kilograms of pure heroin into Singapore, contrary to Section 7 of the Misuse of Drugs Act. Justice T.S. Sinnathuray rejected their defence that they did not know they were carrying heroin at the time of their arrest. and that they should not be charged with importation as they were only in transit and had no intention of entering Singapore itself. The judge remarked that the elaborate manner of covertly transporting "tranquilizers" coupled with the large monetary reward offered to Lam seriously undermined his testimony, which in addition to the fact he did not mention this explanation in his initial statement to police compelled the court to reject his account. The judge also dismissed Tong's attempt to portray herself as a naive and gullible teenager, as her own testimony described her fending for herself in a tough working class district of Hong Kong from a very young age, and she would therefore have been highly unlikely to agree to transport 18 blocks of an unknown substance onto an airplane under incredibly suspicious circumstances. Both Tong and Lam remained expressionless as the judgement and death sentences were handed down.

== Appeals ==
On 16 May 1994, the Appeals court dismissed Tong and Lam's appeal against their convictions. The court determined that the original trial judge was correct in dismissing Lam's claim to have been tricked into smuggling heroin, as the failure of Lam to identify the substance he was caught with as tranquilizers in his cautioned statement immediately after his arrest undermined his testimony in court. The original trial judge was also found to be correct in rejecting Tong's defence of having been set-up by Lam, as the court found it hard to believe someone so streetwise, who had lived an independent life from the age of 14, would have easily agreed to have worn a vest with blocks of an unknown substance sewn into it on a flight half way across the world.

In September 1994, the British Government lodged a letter with the Singaporean authorities appealing for clemency on Tong's behalf(Hong Kong was a British Dependent Territory at the time).

On 19 April 1995, ten members of Tong's family traveled to Singapore to petition President Ong Teng Cheong and appeal for clemency, while in Hong Kong her best friend Man Yuen-fun and members of Amnesty International delivered a petition for clemency to the Singapore Consulate-General.

== Incarceration on Death Row ==
Tong converted to Christianity while on death row, and had shared in a letter to her close friend Man Yuen-fun how her faith was helping her, writing: "The Holy Spirit is now filling up my heart. God will accompany me and I now understand God's plan."

British High Commission official Colin Lane visited Changi Prison to offer assistance to Tong and her family the day before her execution, stating: "Great Britain does not support or condone the death penalty, so this can only be seen as a very tragic, tragic event."

== Execution ==
Despite the pleas for clemency on their behalf, Tong Ching Man and Lam Cheuk Wang were both hanged at Changi Prison shortly before dawn on the morning of 21 April 1995. Three other drug convicts, including another Hong Kong resident Poon Yuen Chung, were also put to death on the same day. Tong, Lam and Poon were reportedly the last three Hong Kong prisoners on Singapore's death row to be executed.

Poon and Tong had become close friends during their incarceration, often praying together in the lead up to their death sentence being carried out, and a few hours after their execution they were cremated after a joint funeral service.

== See also ==
- Capital punishment for drug trafficking
- Capital punishment in Singapore
