= Execution of Poon Yuen Chung =

22 year old female Hong Konger executed in Singapore for heroin trafficking in 1995

Poon Yuen Chung
- 潘婉聰
- Poon after her arrest in 1991
- Born: 1 September 1972; British Hong Kong
- Died: 21 April 1995 (aged 22); Changi Prison, Singapore
- Cause of death: Execution by hanging
- Citizenship: British Dependent Territories citizen
- Occupation: Shop Assistant
- Conviction: Drug trafficking
- Penalty: Death

Chinese name
- Chinese: 潘婉聪
- Hanyu Pinyin: Pān Wǎncōng
- Jyutping: pun^{1} jyun^{2} cung^{1}

Poon Yuen Chung (Chinese: 潘婉聰; Jyutping: pun^{1} jyun^{2} cung^{1}; 1 September 1972 - 21 April 1995) was a 22-year-old female Hong Kong resident executed in Singapore for drug trafficking.

After purportedly being recruited to work as a courier for a drug trafficking organization, Poon was arrested while in possession of over 4 kilograms of high-quality heroin during a stopover in Singapore's Changi Airport.

Despite vehemently protesting her innocence and stating that she was tricked into smuggling narcotics, Poon was found guilty at trial and sentenced to death. Despite appeals being made for the commutation of her death sentence, the Singaporean authorities were ultimately undeterred by pleas for clemency from senior statesmen such as the Governor of Hong Kong.

== Biography ==
Born in British Hong Kong in 1972, Poon Yuen Chung was living with her family in Kwun Tong whilst studying art and also working as a shop assistant at the time of her arrest. By her own admission, Poon was a rebellious teenager who often quarrelled with her family. After dropping out of school aged 15, Poon started hanging out with a group of delinquents who spent their evenings smoking marijuana and drinking alcohol at various karaoke bars and billiard halls around Hong Kong.

In July 1991, Poon informed her parents she was going on a camping trip to Lamma Island, but in reality secretly travelled to Bangkok instead. Her family only discovered the truth after Hong Kong Customs and Excise Department officers arrived at their apartment with a search warrant a few days after Poon's arrest in Singapore.

== Arrest at Changi Airport ==
At about 11:50am on the morning of 16 July 1991, Poon and her fellow Hong Konger accomplice Lam Hoi Ka (Chinese: 林凯嘉; Jyutping: lam^{4} hoi^{2} gaa^{1}; pinyin: Lín kǎi jiā) from the Choi Hung Estate arrived at Singapore Changi Airport on a flight from Bangkok. Customs officer Mohd Rawi's attention was caught by two large Louis Vuitton branded canvas bags on the baggage claim belt of Terminal 2, as there were no folds in the fabric at the bottom and he believed he could see the outline of solid objects inside. Poon and Lam then collected the two canvas bags and started wheeling them towards the express lane of the Customs counter on luggage carts. After stopping them and demanding their passports, the customs officer noted their demeanor immediately changed from jovial to nervous. Discovering they had both flown in from Thailand, he asked Poon to open her bag for a search.

Suspecting the bag had a false bottom, both women were escorted to the Customs Duty Office where a more thorough search could be conducted. Both of their bags had false bottoms made of plywood, with plastic packets underneath containing a powdery substance that was later determined to be heroin. Poon had 6 packets containing 4.4 kg of heroin in the false bottom of her bag, while Lam had 7 packets containing 5 kg of heroin in her bag. The investigation was handed over to Central Narcotics Bureau officer Lim Chin Chuan at around 1:40pm, and he thereafter interrogated the two girls after cautioning them. Poon mostly remained silent, however she did assert that she did not know her bag contained heroin, while Lam also denied knowledge of the narcotics she was caught with.

On 18 July 1991, Poon and Lam were charged with the importation of a total of 9.5 kg of heroin, with an estimated value of $9 million, into Singapore and both were then remanded in custody to await trial.

== Trial ==
On 10 September 1993, Deputy Public Prosecutor (DPP) Ong Hian Sun described to the court how both Poon and Lam were stopped for a passport check at the customs counter of Terminal 2 at 11:50am on the day in question. Customs officer Mohd Rawi inspected both passports & briefly searched Poon's bag, before taking both women to the Customs Duty Office for further questioning. After their luggage had been dismantled it was determined that Poon had 6 plastic packets containing 3 kg of pure heroin in the false bottom of her bag, while Lam had 7 plastic packets containing 3.45 kg of pure heroin in her bag.

In their defence, the women stated that they had flown to Bangkok for a 3-day Buddhist religious pilgrimage, and after first praying at the Erawan Shrine they checked into the Grace Hotel in the Watthana district. After spending the weekend in Bangkok, the girls had planned to visit Singapore for a few days and then fly home to Hong Kong via Changi Airport. The day after their arrival they were approached by a friendly Cantonese speaking Chinese couple named Mr and Mrs Go while they ate lunch in the hotel restaurant. The couple took them out sightseeing around the city and on shopping trips to the Sogo Shopping Complex and also around Patpong, where Mr Go bought them new Louis Vuitton branded canvas bags as gifts. The night before they flew to Singapore, the girls drank some beer during a karaoke session, and since they were tired and needed rest Mrs Go then transferred the contents of Poon and Lam's original suitcases into the new bags on their behalf. The next day, hotel porters took the bags from their room and placed them in the boot of a taxi, then when they arrived at Don Mueang International Airport Mr and Mrs Go carried the bags to the check in counter. Both Poon and Lam denied knowing the bags contained false bottoms and that they contained hidden drugs.

Under cross examination, Poon was questioned about her failure to mention Mr and Mrs Go until her third recorded statement with the police on 26 July 1991, and why in her previous two statements (recorded on 16 & 20 July) she had said her and Lam had bought the bags themselves from a market stall to carry the extra items they had bought. Poon testified that when she was being interrogated she was very frightened and emotional, which caused her to forget important facts by being unable to concentrate. Poon also claimed that the statements were recorded in a question-and-answer format, where each question was biasedly phrased by the police to induce her to admit her guilt, and they were therefore misleading and unreliable. When questioned on why herself and Lam had return tickets to Bangkok at the time of their arrest, while she had claimed they were planning on catching a flight home to Hong Kong from Singapore, Poon could not give any plausible explanation to the court. Poon claimed that she asked Mr Go to purchase the tickets on her behalf as he had contacts at a travel agency who would give a discount on the price. When he handed over the tickets, she did not understand what was written on them due to her poor English reading skills. Lam's testimony in her own defence was virtually identical to Poon's, however when questioned about why she had a return ticket to Bangkok, Lam claimed that she was unaware it was a return ticket as Poon had arranged their flights herself.

Deputy Public Prosecutor Ong Hian Sun argued that Poon and Lam had failed to rebut the legal presumption that they were in possession of and had knowledge of the drugs they were carrying. Their demeanor when asked by officials to check their bags was also important, as customs officer Mohd Rawi said both were stunned when told they wanted to examine the two bags. Their reaction showed they knew they had something illegal in their luggage. Furthermore, neither Poon nor Lam told the customs officers about Mr and Mrs Go or explained how they obtained the bags on the day they were caught and first questioned. The prosecution also found it unbelievable that they would not have checked their belongings carefully before departing Thailand, especially since two strangers had provided the bags and then packed them on their behalf.

== Verdict ==
On 28 September 1993, Poon was found guilty as charged and sentenced to death for importing 3 kilograms of pure heroin into Singapore, contrary to Section 7 of the Misuse of Drugs Act. Describing Poon's testimony as "most unconvincing", judge Mohideen Haja Rubin highlighted Poon's failure to mention Mr and Mrs Go in her initial statement to police as a reason for her testimony to be considered dubious, as well as the fact the girls had return tickets to Thailand seriously undermined their explanation of only transiting through Singapore in order to return to Hong Kong. It was also illogical that Mr Go would purchase more expensive return tickets if the girls had no intention of returning to Thailand, likewise it was implausible that Poon did not know the difference between a return ticket and a single ticket. Considering the overwhelming evidence against the accused, the judge was satisfied that Poon and Lam were fully aware that their bags contained hidden narcotics and they had both willingly acted as drug mules.

When Justice Rubin informed Poon that she would be "taken from here to a place of execution to be hanged", she reportedly broke down into tears. Lam, who was under 18 at the time of her arrest, was also found guilty but was instead sentenced to indefinite detention at the President's Pleasure, because the death penalty was prohibited for minors who committed murder or drug trafficking at the time when they were below 18.

Shortly after the verdict, Hong Kong governor Chris Patten wrote to Poon's father to inform him that the British High Commission in Singapore was closely monitoring the progress of the legal proceedings. Adding that while it would not be appropriate to intervene when judicial proceedings were still ongoing in Singapore, Patten confirmed he was in close contact with the British High Commission to determine what possible assistance they could provide to her in the meantime(Hong Kong was a British Dependent Territory at that time).

== Appeal ==
On 18 January 1994, the Appeals court dismissed Poon's appeal against her conviction. Her defence lawyer Loo Ngan Chor had argued the original trial judge M.P.H Rubin had erred when he ruled Poon's could not be believed because her original statements to police were different than her testimony in court during her trial, highlighting that Poon was not cautioned correctly before she gave them and that she additionally claimed to have been misled by the interrogator's biasedly phrased questions. He also asserted that the packets containing the heroin were handled by customs officers without wearing gloves, therefore possibly obliterating any fingerprint evidence Poon could have relied on to back up her testimony about the Chinese couple. Poon's lawyer also contended that the original trial judge had placed too much emphasis on the fact Poon and Lam had return tickets to Bangkok dated for 23 July 1991, despite claiming they planned to return to Hong Kong after a few days sightseeing in Singapore.

Rejecting all arguments, Chief Justice Yong Pung How ruled that Poon would not have mentioned the Chinese couple at a much later stage, knowing she was being charged with a capital offence of drug trafficking, if she had in fact not known what was in the bags. Instead of waiting for her fourth interview with police, the court felt that she would have offered up this important information at the first opportunity. Also, Poon had failed to rebut the legal presumptions of possession and knowledge, as she had been caught red-handed with the heroin in her possession. In addition, the girls having return airplane tickets to Bangkok, when they had claimed to be flying back to Hong Kong from Singapore, cast strong doubt on the veracity of their testimony. The issue of fingerprint testing was also deemed irrelevant, as even if the prints of a third party were found it would not have proved the girls had no prior knowledge of the herion they were caught in possession of.

== Incarceration on Death Row ==
While on death row, Poon wrote a 4 page letter to her family describing how her life spun out of control, which was then published in the Eastern Express newspaper (as per her request) to serve as a warning to other troubled youths in Hong Kong regarding the perils of teenage rebellion. Poon's letter described how she worked in a factory for a couple of months after dropping out of school, and then briefly ran away from home to hang out with a gang of teenage petty criminals, who as well as fighting rival gangs spent most of their time drinking and smoking marijuana until late at night. Poon also stated that although she treated her family very badly, they did not abandon her when she was convicted and have done everything in their power to support her, adding that they had forgiven her previous behaviour and have always loved her.

In a later interview with the South China Morning Post, which was conducted in the death row section of the Moon Crescent unit of Changi prison, Poon privately confessed to knowingly attempting to traffic heroin via Singapore, saying: "I did smuggle drugs, because a friend had crashed my motorbike, and I wanted money to buy a new one."

== Execution ==
Poon Yuen Chung was hanged at Changi Prison shortly before dawn on the morning of 21 April 1995. As per her wishes, Poon's kidneys and corneas were donated to the Human Organ Transplant Board of Hong Kong after her death. On the same morning, another two Hong Kongers, Lam Cheuk Wang and Tong Ching Man, as well as two other drug convicts (Nigerian citizen Chris Chinenye Obaka and Singaporean national Yeo Hee Seng), were also executed at the same gallows as Poon. Poon, Lam and Tong were reportedly the last three Hongkongers on Singapore's death row to be hanged.

Poon and Tong had become close friends during their incarceration, often praying together (Poon converted to Christianity while on death row) in the lead up to their execution, and they were cremated after a joint funeral. The Christian pastor who conducted the service said Poon had written more than 40 letters during her final days to relatives and friends, telling them she had accepted her fate with calm and that she hoped to see them in the after-life.

== See also ==
- Capital punishment for drug trafficking
- Capital punishment in Singapore
