= List of serial killers by country =

This is a list of notable serial killers, by the country where most of the killings occurred.

== Convicted serial killers by country ==
=== Afghanistan ===
- Abul Djabar: killed 65 men and boys by strangling them with turbans while raping them; suspected of over 300 murders; sentenced to death and hanged in 1970.
- Abdullah Shah: killed at least 20 travelers on the road from Kabul to Jalalabad while serving under warlord Zardad Khan; also killed his wife; executed with a single shot in the head in 2004.

=== Algeria ===
- Madeleine Mouton: known as "The Berthelot Poisoner"; French immigrant who poisoned between four and seven people in Sidi Bel Abbès from 1943 to 1944 to pay off her debts; executed in 1948.

=== Argentina ===
- Brenda Agüero: neonatal nurse who poisoned multiple babies in Córdoba, killing five; sentenced to life imprisonment.
- Marcelo Antelo: known as "The San La Muerte Killer"; drug addict who killed at least four people in Buenos Aires between February and August 2010, allegedly in the name of a pagan saint; sentenced to life imprisonment.
- Roberto José Carmona: known as "The Human Hyena"; abducted, raped and shot dead a teenage girl near Carlos Paz in 1986; sentenced to life, killed two inmates in prison; murdered a cab driver after a brief escape from prison in 2022. Carmona got two additional life sentences for his latest crimes.
- Diego Casanova: known as El Matapresos ("The Convicts' Killer"); murdered five inmates in the Boulogne Sur Mer prison in Mendoza Province while serving a jail term for a murder he committed in 2004.
- Juan Catalino Domínguez: ranch hand who killed eight people around southeast Buenos Aires Province from 1944 to 1948 while on the run; shot dead by police agents in Madariaga in 1948.
- Florencio Fernández: known as "The Argentine Vampire"; killed 15 women in his hometown of Monteros, Tucumán Province, during the 1950s; died in jail in 1968. Dismissed as an urban legend by several Argentine sources.
- Cayetano Santos Godino: known as "Petiso Orejudo" ("Big Eared Midget"); killed four children between 1906 and 1912. He was 16 when arrested in 1912 and died in prison in 1944.
- Cayetano Domingo Grossi: the first known serial killer in Argentine history; Italian immigrant who murdered five of his newborn children in the neighborhood of Retiro in Buenos Aires, between 1896 and 1898; executed by firing squad in 1900.
- Francisco Antonio Laureana: known as "The Satyr of San Isidro"; murdered 15 women from 1974 to 1975 in the northern area of Greater Buenos Aires, raping 13 of them; killed in a shootout with the police in February 1975.
- Yiya Murano: known as "The Poisoner of Monserrat", poisoned three female acquaintances over borrowed money in Buenos Aires in 1979.
- Javier Hernán Pino: killed and robbed five people between February and October 2015 in three cities in different provinces across the country; sentenced to life imprisonment.
- Robledo Puch: known as "The Angel of Death"; killed 11 people before his arrest in 1972; sentenced to life imprisonment in 1980. Currently the longest-incarcerated inmate in South America.

=== Australia ===
- David and Catherine Birnie: responsible for "The Moorhouse Murders"; raped and murdered four women in Willagee in 1986; David died by suicide in 2005, while Catherine remains incarcerated and serving a life sentence.
- Gregory Brazel: shot a woman to death in a 1982 armed robbery; murdered two prostitutes in 1990; sentenced to life imprisonment.
- John Bunting, Robert Wagner and James Vlassakis: convicted of the Snowtown murders of 12 people between 1992 and 1999. Also known as the "Bodies in the Barrels Murders".
- Eric Edgar Cooke: known as "The Night Caller"; killed at least eight people and attempted to kill many more in and around Perth between 1959 and 1963; executed in 1964, becoming the last person to be hanged in Western Australia.
- John Leslie Coombes: killed two men in 1984 and one woman in 2009 around the Victoria area; sentenced to life imprisonment.
- Bandali Debs: convicted of murdering two police officers and two prostitutes in the 1990s; sentenced to life imprisonment.
- Paul Denyer: known as "The Frankston Killer"; murdered three women in 1993 in the surrounding suburbs of Frankston; sentenced to life imprisonment.
- Peter Dupas: murdered between three and six women around Victoria from 1985 to 1999, severing their breasts; sentenced to life imprisonment.
- Leonard Fraser: known as "The Rockhampton Rapist"; convicted of killing four women in Rockhampton, Queensland; died in prison in 2007.
- John Wayne Glover: known as "The Granny Killer"; English immigrant who killed at least six elderly women on Sydney's North Shore; died by suicide in 2005.
- Caroline Grills: known as "Auntie Thally"; a serial poisoner of five family members in New South Wales between 1947 and 1953; died in prison in 1960.
- Paul Steven Haigh: sentenced to life imprisonment without parole for the murders of seven people in Victoria in the late 1970s.
- Matthew James Harris: strangled a friend's brother, a female friend, and a male neighbor over five weeks in 1998 in Wagga Wagga; sentenced to life imprisonment.
- Thomas Jeffrey: Tasmanian penal colony escapee responsible for the murders of five people; executed in 1826.
- Frances Knorr: known as "The Baby Farming Murderess"; English-born baby farmer who killed three infants; executed in 1894.
- Eddie Leonski: known as "The Brownout Strangler"; United States Army soldier who killed three women in Melbourne; executed by the U.S. military in 1942.
- John Lynch: known as "The Berrima Axe Murderer"; killed ten people from 1835 to 1841. Executed in 1842.
- William MacDonald: known as "The Mutilator"; English immigrant who killed at least five men between June 1961 and April 1963 throughout Sydney. Died in prison in 2015, becoming the longest serving inmate in New South Wales.
- John Balaban: a Romanian emigrant who murdered at least five people in France and Australia from 1948 to 1953, including his wife and her family; executed in 1953.
- John and Sarah Makin: late 19th century baby farmers who killed and buried 12 children at a succession of their homes. John was executed in 1893, while Sarah was reprieved, and paroled in 1911.
- Ivan Milat: killed at least seven tourists in Belanglo State Forest, New South Wales between 1989 and 1993, which became known as the "Backpacker Murders"; suspected in similar disappearances in Newcastle. Died in prison in 2019.
- Martha Needle: known as "The Black Widow of Richmond," poisoner of four family members and her boyfriend's brother; executed in 1894.
- Alexander Pearce: Irish convict who escaped with seven other convicts from imprisonment in Van Diemen's Land; five of them were killed and cannibalised, leaving Pearce the only one left; hanged in 1824.
- Martha Rendell: killed three stepchildren with hydrochloric acid in 1907–08; last woman to be hanged in Western Australia.
- Lindsey Robert Rose: New South Wales serial and contract killer who murdered five people between 1984 and 1994; sentenced to life imprisonment.
- 'Snowy' Rowles: committed the "Murchison Murders"; stockman who murdered three people using a method from a then-unpublished book of author Arthur Upfield, and was caught after forgetting to complete one of the steps after the third murder. Executed in 1932.
- Arnold Sodeman: known as "The School-girl Strangler"; killed four children in Melbourne in the 1930s. Executed in 1936.
- John Whelan: Tasmanian penal colony escapee responsible for the murders of five people; executed in 1855.
- Christopher Worrell and James Miller: known as "The Truro Murderers"; murdered seven people in 1976–1977; Worrell died in a car crash prior to identification while Miller was sentenced to life and died in 2008.

=== Austria ===
- Elfriede Blauensteiner: known as "The Black Widow"; poisoner of three individuals; died in prison in 2003.
- Max Gufler: bludgeoned, poisoned and drowned women in the 1950s; convicted of four murders and two attempted murders, but believed to have committed 18; died 1966.
- Leopoldine Kasparek: known as "The Strangler of Vienna"; strangled 14 wealthy, elderly women, killing 4; died in prison in 1921.
- Dariusz Kotwica: known as "The Euro Ripper"; Polish vagrant who murdered at least three pensioners in Austria and Sweden in 2015; suspected of more murders in the Netherlands, Czech Republic and the United Kingdom; sentenced to involuntary commitment.
- Lainz Angels of Death: four nurses at the Lainz General Hospital in Vienna who admitted to murdering 49 patients between 1983 and 1989.
- Martha Marek: poisoned three family members and a lodger in her house with thallium between 1932 and 1937; executed 1938.
- Harald Sassak: gasworks employee who between 1971 and 1972 killed six people for the purpose of robbery; died from an undisclosed illness in 2013.
- Hugo Schenk: known as "The Viennese Housemaids Killer"; swindler who killed four maids in 1883 with his accomplice Karl Schlossarek; suspected of more murders; executed 1884.
- Franz Schmidt: killed a young girl in Innsbruck in 1957, later released and committed a double murder in Redlham in 1984; suspected of a child murder in 1982; sentenced to life, released in 2013.
- Franz and Rosalie Schneider: couple who robbed and murdered at least three, possibly six, maidservants in Lower Austria from June to July 1891; Franz was executed in 1892, while Rosalie's sentence was reduced to life imprisonment.
- Jack Unterweger: author and sexual sadist; convicted of ten murders; believed to have killed 12 women; died by suicide in prison in 1994.

=== The Bahamas ===
- Cordell Farrington: killed four children and his boyfriend from 2002 to 2003; sentenced to death and later commuted to life imprisonment.
- Michaiah Shobek: known as "The Angels of Lucifer Killer"; American immigrant who murdered three fellow US tourists from 1973 to 1974; executed in 1976.

=== Bangladesh ===
- Roshu Kha: enraged over rejection by his lover, Roshu killed at least 11 garment workers in Chandpur District. He pretended to love them, later killing them brutally. Sentenced to death.
- Sabuj Sheikh: known as "Psycho Samrat"; vagrant who murdered six people in Savar from 2025 to 2026; died before trial.
- Ershad Sikder: career criminal and corrupt politician responsible for the torture-murders of numerous people in the 1990s; convicted on seven counts of murder and executed in 2004.

=== Belarus ===
- Ivan Kulesh: drunkard who killed three saleswomen between 2013 and 2014 in the Grodno Region; executed in 2016.
- Yuri Kurilsky: known as "The Monster with the Black Volga"; raped and killed two women and one teenager around the Vitebsk Region from 2004 to 2005; executed in 2007.
- Eduard Lykov: Russian immigrant who killed five people in drunken quarrels from 2002 to 2011; executed in 2014.
- Alexey Mikhalenya: murdered three elderly people as a teenager in 2002; served prison term, released and committed a double murder in 2016; executed in 2018.
- Gennady Mikhasevich: police volunteer who investigated his own mission-oriented murders of 36 women between 1971 and 1985; executed in 1987.
- Igor Mirenkov: known as "The Svietlahorsk Nightmare"; child killer who murdered six boys from 1990 to 1993; executed in 1996.
- Sergey Pugachev and Alexander Burdenko: leaders of "The Polotsk Four"; criminals responsible for killing two girls and two car enthusiasts from 2001 to 2002, as well as numerous robberies with two other accomplices; Pugachev was executed in 2005 and Burdenko was sentenced to life imprisonment.
- Alexander Sergeychik: killed six people from 2000 to 2006 in the Shchuchyn and Grodno Districts; confessed to 12 murders; executed in 2007.
- Nikolai Tymoshenko: known as "The Fatinsky Maniac"; strangled and dismembered at least three women during drunken disputes in the Mogilev Region from 1999 to 2010; sentenced to life imprisonment.

=== Belgian Congo ===
- William Unek: Ugandan police constable who embarked on two mass murder sprees three years apart in the Belgian Congo and Tanganyika; killed by the police in 1957.

=== Belgium ===
- Marie Alexandrine Becker: poisoned at least 11 people with Digitalis between 1933 and 1936; sentenced to life imprisonment; died 1938.
- Michel Bellen: known as "Wurger van Linkeroever" ("The Strangler of the Left Bank"); raped and killed four women in Leuven between 1964 and 1982; sentenced to death but it was converted to life imprisonment; died in prison from heart failure in 2020.
- Jan Caubergh: strangled his pregnant neighbour, his girlfriend and their child in 1979; sentenced to death but it was converted to life imprisonment; was the longest-serving prisoner in the country until his death in 2013.
- Étienne Dedroog: known as "The Lodgers' Killer"; killed a B&B owner in France and a couple in Belgium from October to November 2011; also suspected of a murder in Spain; sentenced to life imprisonment.
- Stephaan Du Lion: raped and murdered four women in Antwerp and Oelegem from 1992 to 1997; identified years later via DNA, convicted, and sentenced to life imprisonment.
- Marc Dutroux: convicted of having kidnapped, tortured and sexually abused six girls ranging in age from 8 to 19, during 1995 and 1996. Four of his victims were murdered; the final two were rescued. Sentenced to life imprisonment.
- Staf Van Eyken: known as "The Vampire of Muizen"; raped and strangled three women from 1971 to 1972 in Muizen and Bonheiden; sentenced to death, commuted to life imprisonment.
- Renaud Hardy: known as "The Parkinson's Murderer"; murdered between two and three women in the Flemish Community from 2009 to 2015; sentenced to life imprisonment.
- Ronald Janssen: killed a woman in 2007 and later his neighbour and her boyfriend in 2010 in Flemish Brabant; admitted to five rapes committed in 1993, but is suspected of 20; sentenced to life imprisonment in 2011.
- Marie-Thérèse Joniaux: poisoned three of her family members between 1894 and 1895; sentenced to death in 1895, but was commuted to life imprisonment; died in Antwerp in 1923.
- Junior Kabunda: known as "The Monster of Brussels"; murdered pianist Benjamin Rawitz-Castel in 2006 during a robbery, later killing his daughter and his girlfriend's grandmother in 2009; sentenced to life imprisonment.
- András Pándy: known as "Vader Blauwbaard" (Father Bluebeard); Hungarian immigrant convicted of the murder and rape of his two wives and four children in Brussels between 1986 and 1990 with the aid of his daughter, Ágnes Pándy; died in prison in 2013.
- Nestor Pirotte: known as "The Crazy Killer"; considered one of the worst Belgian criminals, responsible for the murders of up to seven people from 1954 to 1981, including his great-aunt; died from a heart attack in 2000.

=== Bolivia ===
- Ramiro Artieda: killed his brother in the early 1920s for monetary purposes; emigrated to the United States, but later returned and killed seven women until 1938; was arrested in 1939, confessed and was executed by firing squad in 1939.
- Jaime Cárdenas Pardo: known as "The Sucre Killer"; killed a man during a failed robbery in La Paz in 2006, then raped and murdered two female students in Sucre in 2011; confessed to between 30 and 45 murders in total; sentenced to 30 years imprisonment.
- Richard Choque: serial rapist who raped upwards of 77 women and killed at least two from 2019 to 2022, after being released from prison for a prior murder conviction; suspected in other crimes; sentenced to 30 years imprisonment.
- Armando Normand: plantation manager and serial killer active between 1904 and 1910, during the Putumayo genocide; responsible for innumerable atrocities against the enslaved native population; including the rape and murders of multiple indigenous women, who were at times forced to be his concubines; Normand was arrested in 1913, but escaped from jail before ever facing a trial.

=== Bosnia and Herzegovina ===
- Edin Gačić: shot and killed four people between 1998 and 2019, among them his mother and a police officer; killed by security forces in 2019.

=== Bulgaria ===
- Zhivko Dimitrov: police major who killed six people in Dobrich Province from 1975 to 1981 to steal their money; executed 1981.
- Sokrat Kirshveng: known as "The Killer with the Adze"; murdered two of his lovers in 1919, for which he was sentenced to death; commuted to 17 years imprisonment, and upon release in 1937, murdered his aunt and uncle-in-law; executed in 1937.
- Lenko Latkov: murdered three elderly women in Haskovo Province from 1999 to 2000 and raped two children; suspected in another three killings in Plovdiv Province; murdered by his cellmate in 2003.
- Zdravko Petrov: together with accomplice Plamen Radkov, shot and killed at least five people during robberies in Ruse from 1998 to 1999; both sentenced to life imprisonment without parole.
- Ludwig Tolumov and Ivan Serafimov: known as "The Sour and The Sweet"; criminal duo jointly responsible for three murders from May to July 2000; Serafimov, solely responsible for a 1996 murder, was later murdered by Tolumov, who was himself arrested and sentenced to life imprisonment.

=== Canada ===
- Gerald Thomas Archer: known as "The London Chambermaid Slayer"; killed three female hotel employees in his hometown of London, Ontario between 1969 and 1971; died of a heart attack in 1995.
- Paul Bernardo and Karla Homolka: known as the "Barbie and Ken Killers," they raped and murdered teenage girls in Ontario, including Homolka's younger sister. Paul Bernardo was sentenced to life in prison, and Karla Homolka to 12 years.
- Wayne Boden: known as "The Vampire Rapist"; murdered three women in Montreal and one in Calgary between 1968 and 1971; died in prison in 2006.
- Camille Cléroux: murdered two wives and a neighbour in Ottawa between 1990 and 2010; sentenced to life imprisonment; died in prison in 2021.
- John Martin Crawford: convicted in 1996 for the murders of three women in Saskatoon; died in prison in 2020.
- Léopold Dion: known as "The Monster of Pont-Rouge"; raped and killed four young boys in 1963. Sentenced to death, but reprieved. Murdered in 1972 by a fellow prison inmate.
- William Patrick Fyfe: convicted of killing five women in Montreal between 1979 and 1999; suspect in several other murders.
- Edward Dennis Isaac: killed three women in Prince George between 1981 and 1982, dumping their bodies in wooded areas; sentenced to life imprisonment.
- Russell Maurice Johnson: known as "The Bedroom Strangler"; convicted of raping and murdering three women in the 1970s; total number of victims later found to be higher.
- Gilbert Paul Jordan: known as "The Boozing Barber", killed between eight and ten women by alcohol poisoning in Vancouver; died in 2006.
- Simmi Kahlon: Indian immigrant who murdered her three newborn children in Calgary between 2005 and 2009; died from complications in childbirth before crimes were discovered.
- Joseph LaPage: known as "The French Monster"; murdered four women in Canada and the US from 1867 to 1875; executed in New Hampshire in 1878.
- Kenneth Law: sold lethal products to suicidal people from 2020 until his arrest in 2023. He also engaged with suicide forums and encouraged people to kill themselves with his products. CBC News estimates that Law's products were used in at least 147 suicides worldwide, with victims as young as 14. On May 29, 2026, under a plea deal, Law pleaded guilty to 14 counts of assisting suicide and the Crown agreed to withdraw murder charges.
- Cody Legebokoff: one of Canada's youngest serial killers, convicted of murdering three women and a teenage girl around Prince George, British Columbia between 2009 and 2010.
- Allan Legere: known as "The Monster of the Miramichi"; killer of five individuals; died in prison in 2026.
- Bruce McArthur: Toronto man who killed and dismembered eight men between 2010 and 2017; sentenced to life in prison in 2019.
- Michael Wayne McGray: killed seven people including a woman and child and a cellmate; claims to have killed eleven others.
- Dellen Millard: convicted of murdering three people in Ontario, including his father; two were killed with help from accomplice Mark Smich.
- Clifford Olson: murdered eleven children in British Columbia in the early 1980s; died in prison in 2011.
- Robert Pickton: Port Coquitlam, British Columbia man charged with the first degree murders of 26 women; allegedly confessed to 49 murders; convicted 9 December 2007 of six charges, all reduced to second-degree murder; killed by another prisoner in 2024.
- Jeremy Skibicki: murdered four Indigenous Canadian women between March and May 2022. Found guilty for the murders in 2024.
- Gary Allen Srery: American fugitive who killed four young women in Calgary in the mid-1970s. He died in 2011 before the murders could be linked to him through DNA.
- Yves Trudeau: known as "The Mad Bumper"; former member of the Popeye Moto Club and other outlaw motorcycle clubs; took part in 43 murders between 1973 and 1985; died of bone-marrow cancer in 2008.
- Elizabeth Wettlaufer: registered nurse who murdered eight senior citizens in Ontario with fatal injections of insulin, and gave non-fatal injections to six others, between 2007 and 2016.
- Peter Woodcock: murdered three children in 1956 and 1957 in Toronto and a fellow psychiatric institute patient in 1991; died while incarcerated in 2010.

=== Costa Rica ===
- Adrián Arroyo Gutiérrez: known as "The Southern Psychopath"; raped and strangled between six and eleven drug-addicted prostitutes in San José; sentenced to 110 years imprisonment in 2016.

=== Croatia ===
- Milka Pavlović: milkmaid who poisoned her husband and other peasants with arsenic in Stari Pavljani between March and July 1934; executed in 1935.
- Vinko Pintarić: murdered five people, including his wife, between 1973 and 1990; escaped from custody three times, killed in a 1991 shootout with the police.

=== Cyprus ===
- Nikos Metaxas: Cypriot Army officer who killed five women and two children between September 2016 and August 2018 in the so-called Mitsero murders; sentenced to life imprisonment.

=== Denmark ===
- Ane Cathrine Andersdatter: maid who killed three of her children between 1853 and 1861, drowning them in ditches or wells; executed in 1861, the last woman to be executed in the country.
- Christina Aistrup Hansen: nurse who killed three patients at the Nykøbing Falster Hospital; charges changed from three murders to four attempted manslaughter charges; initially sentenced to life imprisonment, changed to 12 years in prison.
- Peter Lundin: killed his mother in the United States in 1991, then killed his mistress and her two children in Denmark nine years later; sentenced to life imprisonment.
- Dagmar Overbye: childcare provider who killed between nine and twenty-five children in her care in Copenhagen; sentenced to death in 1921 then reprieved; died in prison on 6 May 1929.
- James Schmidt: South Sudanese immigrant who killed three elderly people in Østerbro from February to March 2019 to steal their credit cards; sentenced to life imprisonment.
- Sanjay Sharma: drowned his first wife in a bathtub in Austria in 1997; indicted for the murder, but fled to Denmark, where he killed a second wife and her daughter in 1999; sentenced to life imprisonment for the latter murders.

=== Ecuador ===
- Gilberto Chamba: known as "The Monster of Machala"; murdered eight people in Ecuador and one in Spain; sentenced to 45 years in prison in Spain on 5 November 2006.
- Jairo Humberto Giraldo: known as "The Gay Strangler"; Colombian male prostitute who strangled and robbed other gay men in Quito between April and September 2002; sentenced to 25 years imprisonment.
- Juan Fernando Hermosa: known as "El Niño del Terror"; minor responsible for killing twenty-three people from 1991 to 1992 in Quito, mostly taxi drivers and homosexuals; sentenced to four years imprisonment and then released, later murdered on his 20th birthday by unknown assailants.

=== Egypt ===
- Gaddafi Farag: known as "The Butcher of Giza"; fraudster who murdered four people in Giza and Alexandria from 2015 to 2017 to cover up his financial crimes; sentenced to death.
- Ramadan Abdel Rehim Mansour: known as "Al-Tourbini"; gang leader who raped and murdered homeless children across Egypt by throwing them off trains in the 2000s, sometimes burying them alive; executed in 2010.
- Saad Iskandar Abdel Masih: known as "The Butcher of Karmouz"; murdered a mistress for her money in his hometown of Asyut in 1948, before moving to Alexandria and committing at least two more murders until 1951; executed in 1953.
- Raya and Sakina: Egypt's most famous serial killers and the first women to be executed by the modern Egyptian state; executed along with their husbands in 1921.

=== Estonia ===
- Johannes-Andreas Hanni: murderer, rapist, and cannibal who killed three people in 1982; died by suicide in police custody in 1982.
- Valdek Laas: gerontophile who murdered three elderly women in southern Estonia from May to October 1996; died prior to sentencing from tuberculosis.
- Anatoli Neželski: murdered his ex-wife's boyfriend and two other people in robberies between 1994 and 1996 in Tallinn; sentenced to 15 years imprisonment, and released in 2013.
- Märt Ringmaa: known as "The Bomb Man of Pae Street"; killed seven people over the course of ten years in Tallinn using IEDs that exploded in public places.
- Aleksei Rjabkov: murdered three men with accomplices in 1995; released from prison, whereupon he murdered a drinking companion in 2009; sentenced to 13 years imprisonment, status unknown.
- Aleksandr Rubel: Ukrainian who was convicted of the murder of six people in Tallinn as a minor in the late 1990s; released from prison in 2006 and subsequently returned to Ukraine.
- Juri Sulimov: Ukrainian immigrant who murdered two prisoners in 1983 and 1986, and an acquaintance in 1994 after his release; sentenced to death, commuted to life imprisonment.
- Vladimir Tenetov: known as "The Lilleküla Murderer"; Russian immigrant who raped, tortured, and murdered at least three teenage girls and young women in Tallinn's Lilleküla district from 1991 to 1992; initially sentenced to 15 years imprisonment, commuted to death and finally to life imprisonment, which he served until his death in 2020.
- Yuri Ustimenko and Dmitry Medvedev: Russian duo who committed robberies, killing five people; Medvedev was killed by police in Latvia, and Ustimenko was captured in Poland, extradited to Estonia and sentenced to life imprisonment.

=== Eswatini ===
- David Thabo Simelane: raped and killed 28 women from 2000 to 2001, suspected of 45; sentenced to death.

=== Fiji ===
- Waisale Waqanivalu: bludgeoned three couples in 2003, killing five people and injuring another; sentenced to life imprisonment.

=== Finland ===
- Juhani Aataminpoika: known as "Kerpeikkari"; murdered twelve people in the span of two months in 1849, including his parents; sentenced to death, commuted to life imprisonment; died in 1854.
- Esa Åkerlund: murdered three men at a McDonald's in Porvoo in 2010, after being released for the 1995 murder of his wife; suspected, but acquitted, of a 1993 murder; sentenced to 15 years imprisonment.
- Matti Haapoja: convicted murderer of three, but admitted to the killing of 18; evidence suggests having killed as many as 22–25 people between 1867 and 1894 in Finland and Siberia; sentenced to life imprisonment, but died by suicide from hanging in a prison cell.
- Ismo Junni: killed his wife in 1980, then killed four people in arson attacks at the Kivinokka allotment garden in Helsinki from 1986 to 1989; died by suicide while in custody.
- Ensio Koivunen: known as "Häkä-Enska"; abducted and murdered three female hitchhikers between July and August 1971; sentenced for 25 years to prison, but released in the 1980s; died in 2003.
- Jukka Lindholm: also known as Michael Penttilä; murdered three women from 1985 to 1993 in and around Oulu and one in Helsinki in 2018; sentenced to life imprisonment, and is currently appealing the decision; has spent 25 years in prison between his crimes. He is the only Finn that fits the FBI's description of a serial killer.
- Tommi Nakari: murdered his two common-law wives and his mother in drunken rampages between 1992 and 2008, claiming that he couldn't remember the killings afterwards; sentenced to 14.5 years imprisonment.
- Aino Nykopp-Koski: female nurse convicted of five murders and five attempted murders of patients between 2004 and 2009. Sentenced to life in prison.
- Kaisa Vornanen-Karaduman: purposefully neglected her five newborn children, starving them to death between 2005 and 2013; initially convicted and sentenced to life imprisonment, later reduced to 13 years imprisonment for manslaughter.

=== Ghana ===
- Charles Quansah: known as "The Accra Strangler"; convicted of the strangulation deaths of nine women in Accra; suspected of killing 34; sentenced to death in 2003.

=== Greece ===
- Yanis Baltass: shepherd who shot at least three foreign laborers and his ex-fiancée's brother from 1995 to 2004; sentenced to life imprisonment.
- Antonis Daglis: known as "The Athens Ripper"; convicted in 1997 of the strangulation murder and dismemberment of three women and the attempted murder of six others; died by suicide in police custody in 1997.
- Ekaterini Dimetrea: known as "The Poisoner of Mani"; poisoned four family members with parathion from May to September 1962; executed in 1965.
- Hermann Duft and Hans Wilhelm Bassenauer: West Germans who murdered six people in Greece within a short period in 1969; executed in 1969.
- Petros Koulaxidis: known as "The Vampire of Hamilos"; Russian-born bigamist who killed at least five wives in Central Macedonia from 1917 to 1930; suspected of other murders, some possibly committed in Russia; executed in 1932.
- Kyriakos Papachronis: known as "The Ogre of Drama"; murdered three women from 1981 to 1982, committing other crimes as well; sentenced to life imprisonment, released on bail in 2004.
- Giannis and Thymios Retzos: brothers responsible for numerous kidnapping and murders in Epirus between 1917 and 1924; released under amnesty, then orchestrated a robbery in 1928, during which eight people died; both executed in 1930.
- Mariam Soulakiotis: known as "The Woman Rasputin"; convent abbot who lured, tortured and killed 177 wealthy women and children from 1939 to 1951; died 1954.
- Dimitris Vakrinos: killed five people and attempted seven more murders in and around Athens for minor quarrels between 1987 and 1996; hanged himself in the prison showers in 1997.
- Roula Pispirigou: Known as "the Medea of Patras," she was convicted of murdering her three daughters: the first, a 5-year-old girl, was allegedly suffocated in 2019, followed by a 6-month-old baby in 2021, and finally, poisoning her eldest, 9-year-old, with ketamine. She was sentenced to life in prison.

=== Guatemala ===
- José Miculax Bux: also known as "The Monster of Guatemala"; killed 15 boys in 1946 along with cousin Mariano Macú Miculax; publicly executed by firing squad in 1946.

=== Hong Kong ===
- Lam Kor-wan: sexual sadist who murdered and dismembered four women in the 1980s; sentenced to death (commuted to life imprisonment as per tradition at that time).
- Lam Kwok-wai: murdered three women, apprehended in 1993 and sentenced to life imprisonment.

=== Hungary ===
- Angel Makers of Nagyrév: group of women led by Susanna Fazekas who poisoned around 300 people in the village of Nagyrév between 1914 and 1929.
- Aladár Donászi: robber who killed four people from 1991 to 1992 with his accomplice László Bene; died by suicide in prison in 2001.
- Zoltán Ember: known as "The Szentkirályszabadja Monster"; killed four pensioners and his brother from 1991 to 2004 in Szentkirályszabadja, binding his latter victims; sentenced to life imprisonment, died by suicide in 2016.
- Margit Filó: known as "The Rókus Black Widow"; poisoned and strangled between four and six people close to her from 1958 to 1968 for monetary gain; imprisoned in a mental asylum, where she later died.
- Mária Gerzsány: poisoned an ex-husband and two other men in Kistelek between 1905 and 1911, but is believed to be responsible for upwards of 50 murders; sentenced to life imprisonment, dying sometime in the 1920s.
- Pál Gyömbér: killed and robbed elderly people in the Great Hungarian Plain from February to November 1888, spending the stolen items on his wife; executed 1890.
- Piroska Jancsó-Ladányi: strangled five teenage girls in Törökszentmiklós between 1953 and 1954, molesting their corpses afterwards; executed 1954.
- Béla Kiss: murdered at least 23 women and one man, escaped justice in the confusion of World War I.
- Péter Kovács: known as "The Martfű Monster"; truck driver who raped and killed between four and five women from 1957 and 1967, possibly responsible for more murders; executed in 1968.
- Tibor Kruchió: together with accomplice Lajos Kocsis, killed four people around Szeged from September to October 2001 for robbery purposes; sentenced to life imprisonment.
- Gusztáv Léderer: gendarme who robbed and killed a man in Budapest with his wife in 1925; suspected of committing other murders during the White Terror; executed in 1926.
- Gusztáv Nemeskéri: known as "The Katóka Street Killer"; killed four people between 1996 and 1999 to settle his debts, including his half-brother; sentenced to life imprisonment.
- Erzsébet Papp: known as "The Nicotine Killer"; poisoned four people close to her with nicotine between 1957 and 1958; initially sentenced to life imprisonment, resentenced to death and executed in 1962.
- Zoltán Szabó: known as "The Balástya Monster"; killed and mutilated at least four women on his farm in Balástya between 1998 and 2001; died by suicide while imprisoned in 2016.

=== Iceland ===
- Björn Pétursson: known as "Axlar-Björn"; killed at least nine travellers in the 16th century. Executed in 1596.

=== India ===
- Thug Behram: alleged to have killed over 900 people.
- Muthukutty Chandran: known as "Ripper Chandran"; convicted of 14 robbery-murders committed between 1985 and 1986 in Kerala, executed by hanging on 6 July 1991.
- Seema Gavit and Renuka Shinde: sisters who kidnapped and murdered five children between 1990 and 1996.
- M. Jaishankar: known as "Psycho Shankar", involved in about 30 rapes, murders and robbery cases around Tamil Nadu. Died by suicide in prison in 2018.
- Chandrakant Jha: befriended and murdered seven male migrants from 1998 to 2007; sentenced to life imprisonment.
- Joshi-Abhyankar serial murders: series of ten murders committed by four art students in Pune; all were executed in 1983.
- KD Kempamma: known as "Cyanide Mallika"; poisoned six women from 1999 to 2007 with cyanide; India's first convicted female serial killer; sentenced to death, commuted to life imprisonment.
- Mohan Kumar: known as "Cyanide Mohan"; killed twenty female victims with cyanide, claiming they were contraceptive pills; sentenced to death in 2013.
- Ravinder Kumar: killed the children of poor families from 2008 until his arrest in 2015.
- Mahanand Naik: known as "Dupatta Killer"; convicted of strangling multiple women in the state of Goa between 1994 and 2009; sentenced to life imprisonment.
- Motta Navas: killed pavement dwellers in their sleep during a three-month period in 2012 in Kollam.
- Santosh Pol: known as "Dr. Death"; killed six people with succinylcholine in Dhom, Maharashtra.
- Raman Raghav: known as "Psycho Raman"; Mumbai man who killed homeless people and others in their sleep. Died while incarcerated in 1995.
- Umesh Reddy: confessed to 18 rapes and murders, convicted in nine cases.
- Ripper Jayanandan; killed seven people during robberies.
- Satish: known as "The Bahadurgarh Baby Killer"; confessed to and convicted for ten murders; sentenced to life imprisonment.
- Auto Shankar: murdered nine teenage girls in Thiruvanmiyur, Chennai during a six-month period in 1988; executed in 1995.
- Kampatimar Shankariya: killed at least 70 people with hammer in 1977–78; executed in 1979.
- Devendra Sharma: doctor who murdered taxi and truck drivers across India between 2002 and 2004, dumping their bodies in canals; suspected of more than 100 murders; sentenced to life imprisonment.
- Darbara Singh: convicted for two murders, 17 suspected victims. Singh had three children; his wife expelled him from their house, because of his "bad habits". Died in prison in 2018.
- Akku Yadav: murdered at least three people and dumped their bodies on the railroad tracks; lynched by a mob of around 200 women in Nagpur.

=== Indonesia ===
- Oesin Bestari: first known recorded Indonesian serial killer; murdered at least 25 people after conned them and robbing his victim's post-mortem between 1961 and 1964; executed in 1978 and become the first Indonesian executed under civil criminal code.
- Baekuni: pedophile who killed between four and 14 boys from 1993 to 2010; sentenced to life imprisonment, later changed to the death sentence.
- Rio Alex Bulo: known as "Rio the Hammerhead"; murdered at least four car rental salesmen with a hammer between 1997 and 2001, and later his cellmate in 2005; executed in 2008.
- Gribaldi Handayani: police officer who shot and killed seven people, including a lover and his third wife, over various disputes from 1999 to 2004; sentenced to death.
- Very Idham Henyansyah: known as "The Singing Serial Killer"; convicted and sentenced to death in 2008 for the killing of 11 people.
- Siswanto: killed and mutilated twelve boys; died in police custody of natural causes in 2007.
- Astini Sumiasih: killed and then dismembered three neighbors to whom she owned money in Malang from 1992 to 1996; executed 2005.
- Ahmad Suradji: admitted to killing 42 women around Medan; sentenced to death and executed by firing squad on 10 July 2008.
- Slamet Tohari: swindler who fatally poisoned a minimum of 12 people in Central Java between 2020 and 2023; sentenced to death in 2024.

=== Iran ===
- Hoshang Amini: known as "The Ghost of the Qanat Wells"; abducted, raped and murdered 67 people near Varamin from 1954 to 1962; executed in 1963.
- Farid Baghlani: known as "The Cyclist Killer"; murdered 15 women, girls and one boy from 2004 to 2008 out of hatred for women; executed in 2010.
- Omid Barak: known as "The Highway Killer"; strangled and robbed 10 women in Gilan Province and Karaj to 2006 to 2008; executed 2011.
- Mohammed Bijeh: known as "The Tehran Desert Vampire"; killed at least 54 young boys near Tehran; executed in 2005.
- Saeed Hanaei: known as "The Spider Killer"; killed at least 16 women around Mashhad; executed in 2002.
- Gholamreza Khoshroo Kurdieh: known as "The Night Bat"; murdered nine women in Tehran in 1997, burning the bodies afterwards; executed in 1997.
- Majid Salek Mahmoudi: murdered twenty-four people from 1981 to 1985, primarily women he considered unfaithful to their husbands; died by suicide in prison before he could be sentenced.
- Hassan Orangi: known as "The Singing Killer"; raped and murdered 62 women around Mashhad from 1945 to 1951, with the help of accomplice Abbas Ali Zarifian; executed in 1951.
- Mahin Qadiri: first known female serial killer in Iran; acquitted of murder in 2006, robbed and killed five elderly women in Qazvin from February to May 2009; executed in 2010.
- Esmail Rangraz: murdered a young girl in 2017, confessed to the murder of two women in 2012 and 2014 after his arrest; executed in 2017.

=== Iraq ===
- Abboud and Khajawa: elderly couple who murdered and cannibalized the remains of one elderly neighbor and hundreds of young children in Mosul in 1917; both executed in 1917.
- Abu Tubar: known as "The Hatchet Man"; murdered an undetermined number of people with a hatchet in 1970s Baghdad; executed in 1980.
- Ali Asghar Borujerdi: known as "Asghar the Murderer"; killed 33 young adults in Iraq and Iran; executed in June 1934.
- Louay Omar Mohammed al-Taei: medical doctor found to have killed 43 wounded policemen, soldiers and officials in Kirkuk; was a member of an insurgent cell.

=== Ireland ===
- Mark Nash: murdered two female patients in Grangegorman in March 1997, followed by a couple in Ballintober in August; another man was wrongfully convicted of the first double murder; sentenced to life imprisonment.
- Geoffrey Evans and John Shaw: Englishmen who murdered two women in Ireland in 1976. They planned to rape and kill one woman each week.
- Alice Kyteler: poisoned her four husbands in the 14th century; was accused of witchcraft, fled and escaped before trial.

=== Israel ===
- Nicolai Bonner: known as "The Haifa Homeless Killer"; Moldovan immigrant who killed four homeless people in Haifa between February and May 2005, burning the bodies afterwards; sentenced to life imprisonment.
- Vladimir Piniov: known as "The Bat Yam Homeless Killer"; Russian immigrant who murdered as least three vagrants in Bat Yam during drunken quarrels between 1999 and 2000; died by suicide before trial.
- Asher Raby: mentally-ill religious fanatic who killed five people across Israel and the West Bank from March to November 1979, including Philoumenos Hasapis; deemed unfit to stand trial and sent to psychiatric facility.

=== Italy ===
- Wolfgang Abel and Marco Furlan: German-Italian duo who committed between 10 and 28 murders in Italy, Germany and the Netherlands between 1977 and 1984; sentenced to life, but released on parole.
- Andrea Arrigoni: private investigator who shot and killed at least two prostitutes and two carabinieri in two separate incidents in 2004 and 2005; killed by police during a shootout.
- Beasts of Satan: Satanic cult members who committed three notorious ritual murders from 1998 to 2004.
- Marco Bergamo: known as "The Monster of Bolzano"; murdered five women in Bolzano from 1985 to 1992; died from a lung infection in 2017.
- Ramon Berloso: known as "The Crossbow Killer"; killed a man during a brawl in 1993; imprisoned for 6 years and released, whereupon he killed two prostitutes with a crossbow in 2010 in order to rob them; died by suicide before trial.
- Donato Bilancia: known as "The Monster of Liguria"; murdered 17 people in seven months between 1997 and 1998, died in prison.
- Antonio Boggia: known as "The Monster of Milan"; murdered four people for monetary purposes between 1849 and 1859; hanged 1862.
- Sonya Caleffi: nurse who poisoned terminally ill patients between 2003 and 2004, killing five of them; sentenced to 20 years of imprisonment.
- Arrigo Candela: known as "Rambo"; shot and killed seven people during robberies in Italy and France from 1990 to 1992; sentenced to life imprisonment in France, and died in prison.
- Leonardo Cazzaniga: known as "Doctor Death"; anesthesiologist who poisoned between nine and fifteen elderly patients in Saronno between 2010 and 2014, some with the help of his lover Laura Taroni; sentenced to life imprisonment.
- Leonarda Cianciulli: known as "The Soap-Maker of Correggio"; murderer of three women between 1939 and 1940; died in a women's criminal asylum in 1970.
- Sergio Cosimini: known as "The Madman of Florence"; shot and killed an elderly man and two carabinieri in unprovoked attacks between 1989 and 1990; interned at a psychiatric facility.
- Sergio Curreli: known as "The Monster of Arbus"; shepherd and local gang leader who murdered five people around Arbus from 1982 to 1990, either in personal disputes or for money; sentenced to life imprisonment.
- Franco Fuschi: murdered at least 11 people during robberies across Turin from 1977 to 1994; confessed to more than 30 murders in Italy and abroad, including contract killings and terrorist attacks; sentenced to life imprisonment and died behind bars in 2009.
- Bartolomeo Gagliano: known as "The Valentine's Monster"; killed a prostitute in Liguria in 1981, escaped with another inmate from a mental hospital in 1989 and killed two more; died by suicide in 2015.
- Ferdinand Gamper: known as "The Monster of Merano"; killed six people in 1996.
- Elvino Gargiulo: known as "The Monster of Quadraro"; killed three people between 1991 and 1994.
- Giancarlo Giudice: known as "The Monster of Turin"; murdered nine prostitutes in Turin from 1983 to 1986, most of whom reminded him of his stepmother; sentenced to life, commuted to 30 years and released in 2008.
- Maurizio Giugliano: known as "The Wolf of Ager Romanus"; killed two women around Rome from 1983 to 1984, but suspected in seven total; sent to a mental hospital and killed a fellow inmate; died in 1994.
- Callisto Grandi: known as "The Child Killer"; killed four children in Florence between 1873 and 1875 for making fun of him; sentenced to 20 years imprisonment and later interned at an asylum, where he died in 1911.
- Antonio Mantovani: known as "The Monster of Milan"; murdered a friend's wife in 1983; convicted and imprisoned, but allowed to periodically leave prison for work, after which he killed at least two more women in 1997; sentenced to life, committed suicide in prison.
- Pier Paolo Brega Massone: murdered at least four people in Milan and maimed dozens of other victims through unnecessary surgeries to illegally obtain a large amounts of money refunds; convicted and given a life sentence.
- Andrea Matteucci: known as "The Monster of Aosta"; murdered a merchant and three prostitutes in Aosta from 1980 to 1995; sentenced to 28 years imprisonment and three years in a mental institution.
- Maurizio Minghella: killed five women in his hometown of Genoa in 1978; imprisoned and released, after which he murdered at least four more and is suspected of other murders between 1997 and 2001; sentenced to life imprisonment.
- Vitalino Morandini: known as "The Monster of Pontoglio"; habitual thief who murdered nine people in rural Bergamo and Brescia from 1955 to 1956; suspected in the death of his aunt; sentenced to life, and later hanged himself in prison.
- Giorgio Orsolano: known as "The Hyena of San Giorgio"; raped, killed, and dismembered three girls from 1834 to 1835 in his hometown of San Giorgio Canavese; executed 1835.
- Francesco Passalacqua: known as "The Riviera dei Cedri Serial Killer"; murdered an acquaintance and three elderly men in rural Calabria from 1992 to 1997; sentenced to life and later paroled, but was returned to prison after stabbing a man in 2024.
- Ernesto Picchioni: known as "The Monster of Nerola"; murdered people around his home; died of cardiac arrest in 1967.
- Peppino Pisanu: known as "The Monster of Fossano"; killed his mother-in-law and sister-in-law in 1972; imprisoned, released and murdered another woman in 1998; fate unknown.
- Milena Quaglini: murdered her husband and two men who tried to rape her from 1995 to 1999; died by suicide while imprisoned in 2001.
- Patrick Schaff: known as "The House of Horrors Killer"; French vagrant who killed two homeless women in Cuneo and Ivrea in 1995, dismembering their bodies post-mortem; later killed a cellmate in 2005; sentenced to 26 years, died in a psychiatric facility in 2022.
- Cesare Serviatti: known as "The Landru of the Tiber"; strangled and dismembered at least three women he sought through lonely hearts advertisements from 1928 to 1932; executed 1933.
- Roberto Spinetti: known as "The 7.65 Caliber Killer"; Swiss man who shot four prostitutes in northern Italy to pay off his gambling debts between October and November 2003, three of whom died; sentenced to life imprisonment.
- Angelo Stazzi: known as "The Angel of Death"; killed his mistress in 2001, and later poisoned between five and seven patients at a nursing home in Sant'Angelo Romano; sentenced to life imprisonment.
- Gianfranco Stevanin: known as "The Monster of Terrazzo"; raped and murdered prostitutes after violent sex games between 1993 and 1994; violated the corpse of one victim; sentenced to life imprisonment.
- Roberto Succo: murdered at least five people, including his parents, died by suicide while in prison in 1988.
- Giulia Tofana: leader of a group of female poisoners in the 17th century; died in her bed, never arrested.
- Giorgio Vizzardelli: shot and killed five people around Sarzana from 1937 to 1939; sentenced to life imprisonment; died by suicide by slitting his throat with a kitchen knife in 1973.
- Umberto Zadnich: killed his common-law wife in Trieste in 1974, and later a cellmate at the mental hospital in 1976; after release, killed his daughter in 1987; interned at a psychiatric hospital.

=== Jamaica ===
- Lewis Hutchinson: Scottish immigrant convicted of shooting dozens of people in the 18th century; executed in 1773.

=== Jordan ===
- Bilal Musa and Susan Ibrahim: spouses who robbed and murdered 12 people around Amman and Zarqa from 1994 to 1998; Musa was executed in 2000, while Ibrahim died in prison in 2001; guilt has been questioned for most murders.

=== Kazakhstan ===
- Borman Gang: gang of drug addicts and alcoholics led by Alexander Suvorov who raped, tortured and murdered at least 29 people in Almaty from 1998 to 2000; two members died before trial, while the rest were incarcerated.
- Valery Devyatyorov: known as "The Alma-Ata Strangler"; raped dozens of young girls and women around Alma-Ata between 1967 and 1968, strangling at least three; executed in 1968.
- Alexander Dudnik: known as "The Akmola Chikatilo"; raped and murdered three female hitchhikers around Arshaly from 1993 to 1994, burning their corpses afterwards; executed in 1996.
- Nikolai Dzhumagaliev: known as "Metal Fang"; raped and hacked seven women to death with an axe in Almaty in 1980, then cannibalised them using his unusual false teeth. Declared insane and sent to a mental hospital.
- Yuri Ivanov: known as "The Ust-Kamenogorsk Maniac"; raped and killed 16 girls and young women who spoke badly of men in Ust-Kamenogorsk from 1974 to 1987; executed in 1989.
- Rustam Kiknadze: violent recidivist who killed two women in 2004; paroled and killed three more women in Taraz over twenty days in 2020; sentenced to 26 years imprisonment.
- Ivan Mandzhikov: known as "The Kazgugrad Monster"; raped and strangled four female students and one man in the vicinity of KazGU University between 1988 and 1989; executed in 1993.
- Oleg Murayenko: murdered an inmate in 1998; after release, murdered six women between March and November 2000 in and around Petropavl; executed in 2002.
- Red Light District Orderlies: a gang of two orderlies and a paramedic who murdered at least seven prostitutes in Almaty between 1998 and 1999, dismembering and eating some of the victims' remains; all three were sentenced to death and later had their sentences commuted to life imprisonment.
- Sergey Yarovoy: known as "The Bloody Paramedic"; raped and murdered a woman in Boralday in 1994; sentenced to 15 years but paroled, after which he committed six further murders between 2006 and 2008 in Ust-Kamenogorsk and Opytnoye Pole; sentenced to life imprisonment.
- Toregeldy Zharambaev: known as "The Shymkent Chikatilo"; tortured and murdered at least 33 people in and around Shymkent between 1990 and 1992; executed in 1993.

=== Kyrgyzstan ===
- Viktor Selikhov: known as "The Naked Demon"; attacked and raped young girls and women in Frunze and its surroundings between 1962 and 1964, killing at least three; executed in 1965.

=== Latvia ===
- Ivars Grantiņš: known as "The Ceraukste Maniac"; raped, murdered and dismembered two women and his daughter from June to August 2008 in Ceraukste Parish; sentenced to life imprisonment.
- Sergejs Juhņevičs: murdered three women in Jelgava after getting into arguments with them from 2008 to 2011; confessed to three more murders which were never substantiated; sentenced to life imprisonment.
- Ansis Kaupēns: army deserter who committed 30 robberies and 19 murders from 1920 to 1926; executed in 1927 in Vircava Parish.
- Yuri Krinitsyn: known as "The Riga Upyr"; mentally-ill Russian immigrant who killed three men, including two KGB operatives, in Riga in 1975; found incompetent to stand trial and sentenced to involuntary commitment.
- Kaspars Petrovs: killed between 13 and 38 elderly women in Riga until 2005; sentenced to life imprisonment.
- Stanislav Rogolev: known as "Agent 000"; robbed, raped and killed ten women from 1980 to 1982; suspected of having inside information for the investigation on him; executed in 1984.

=== Lebanon ===
- George and Michel Tanielian: known as "The Taxi Driver Killers"; Syrian brothers who killed and robbed mostly taxi drivers in the Matn District from July to November 2011; both sentenced to death.

=== Lithuania ===
- Kazys Jonaitis: known as "The Roadside Maniac"; convicted of murder in 1984 and released, whereupon he raped, bludgeoned and decapitated at least three women from 2000 to 2001; sentenced to life imprisonment.
- Valentinas Laskys: together with his daughter, killed 4 people in Lithuania and Belarus during robberies from 1990 to 1992; executed in 1993.
- Antanas Varnelis: murdered and robbed six pensioners between July and December 1992 around several municipalities; executed in 1994.

=== Malta ===
- Silvio Mangion: only known serial killer in Malta; murdered three elderly pensioners during robberies between 1984 and 1998; sentenced to life imprisonment.

=== Mexico ===
- Sara Aldrete: known as "La Madrina"; cult follower of Adolfo Constanzo; convicted in 1994 of murdering several individuals during her association with Constanzo.
- David Avendaño Ballina: known as "The Hamburger"; alleged leader of a sex servant gang who robbed and poisoned their clients from 1997 to 2007; arrested in 2008.
- Juana Barraza: known as "Mataviejitas" ("Old Lady Killer"); operated within the metropolitan area of Mexico City until 25 January 2006.
- José Luis Calva: cannibal; police found the remains of multiple female victims in his house; died by suicide prior to capture in 2007.
- Gregorio Cárdenas Hernández: known as "The Strangler of Tacuba"; strangled four women in the Tacuba neighborhood of Mexico City in 1942; died in 1999 of natural causes.
- Andrés Ulises Castillo Villarreal: known as "The Chihuahua Ripper"; drugged, raped, killed, and mutilated three men in Chihuahua in 2015; confessed to 12 more murders, but suspected of 20 overall; sentenced to 120 years imprisonment.
- The Ciudad Juárez Rebels: gang of serial killers who killed women in Ciudad Juárez from 1995 to 1996; convicted of eight murders, suspected of killing between 10 and 14; claimed to have worked for Abdul Latif Sharif.
- Adolfo Constanzo: known as "The Godfather of Matamoros"; serial killer and cult leader in Mexico; died by suicide in 1989.
- Miguel Cortés Miranda: known as "The Monster of Iztacalco"; chemist who raped and murdered at least three women and teenagers in Mexico City from 2012 to 2024; died awaiting trial.
- Edgar Álvarez Cruz and Francisco Granados: responsible for the so-called "Feminicides of the cotton field"; Cruz, with the help of the drugged Granados, kidnapped, raped, tortured, and killed at least eight to ten young women in satanic rituals between 1993 and 2003; suspected of committing a total of fourteen murders.
- Pedro Padilla Flores: known as "El Asesino de Rio Bravo" ("The Killer of the Bravo River"); killed three women in 1986; escaped to the U.S. but was deported back to Mexico; suspect in the Ciudad Juárez murders.
- Óscar García Guzmán: known as "The Monster of Toluca"; killed six people between 2006 and 2019, including his father, in Toluca; sentenced to 217 years imprisonment.
- Gabriel Garza Hoth: known as "The Black Widower"; killed three women in Mexico City between 1991 and 1998, his victims were wives and lovers.
- Delfina and María de Jesús González: known as "Las Poquianchis"; killed a total of 91 in Guanajuato; arrested and sentenced to 40 years in prison in 1964.
- Francisco Guerrero Pérez: known as "El Chalequero" ("The man of the vests"); the first documented serial killer in Mexico; committed approximately 20 murders in Mexico City between 1880 and 1888 plus one more in 1908.
- Fernando Hernández Leyva: convicted of 33 murders in 1986, suspected of 137 killings.
- Juan Carlos Hernández and Patricia Martínez: pair from Ecatepec, State of Mexico, known as "The Monsters of Ecatepec"; who raped, murdered, and cannibalized between 10 and 20 women. Active between 2012 and 2018.
- Luis Oscar Jiménez Herrera: known as "The Tinaco Killer"; murdered 16 women in Nuevo León between 2013 and 2016, but also suspected of a 2010 murder in San Luis Potosí; sentenced to 123 years imprisonment.
- César Armando Librado Legorreta: known as "El Coqueto" ("The Coquette"); raped and killed six women in the Greater Mexico City between 2011 and 2012; sentenced to 240 years in prison.
- Los Huipas: gang of four indigenous homosexual men, led by Eusebio Yocupicio Soto, who murdered seven men who made fun of them between 1949 and 1950; initially sentenced to death, later commuted to 30 years imprisonment.
- Rudolfo Infante and Anna Villeda: couple from Matamoros responsible for the murders of eight women. Apprehended in 1991.
- Daniel Audiel López Martínez: killed five women in Ciudad Juárez between 2007 and 2010.
- Raúl Osiel Marroquín: known as "El Sadico" ('The Sadist'); killed four gay men in Mexico City.
- Filiberto Hernández Martínez: killed six people between 2010 and 2013 in San Luis Potosí.
- Guadalupe Martínez de Bejarano: known as "La Mujer Verdugo"; tortured and then murdered three young girls in Mexico City in 1887 and 1892; died in prison.
- Tadeo Fulgencío Mejía: responsible for several murders during the 1890s and 1900s, motivated by delirious idea of contacting his deceased wife. The house in Guanajuato, where he committed the crimes, is known as "The House of Laments" (Casa de los lamentos), and according to legend is haunted.
- Andrés Mendoza: raped, murdered and cannibalized between 19 and 30 women in Atizapán, State of Mexico. Sentenced to life imprisonment.
- Silvia Meraz: Sonora woman involved in an occult sect, killed three people with the aid of family members; sentenced to 180 years in prison.
- Felícitas Sánchez Aguillón: known as "The Ogress of Colonia Roma"; nurse, midwife and baby farmer responsible for an unknown number of murders during the 1930s, possibly 50 victims, in Mexico City.
- Cristina Soledad Sánchez Esquivel: known as "La Matataxistas"; killed between five and six taxi drivers in Nuevo León in 2010 with her accomplice Aarón Herrera Hernández; sentenced to 130 years imprisonment.
- Magdalena Solís: religious fanatic, proclaimed "The High Blood's Priestess"; killed eight people in ritual sacrifices.
- Mario Alberto Sulú Canché: killed three young girls between 2007 and 2008 in Mérida, Yucatán; later died by suicide in prison.

=== Moldova ===
- Alexander Skrynnik: known as "The Moldavian Chikatilo"; killed and then mutilated three women in Chișinău and Yakutia from the mid-1970s to 1980; executed in 1981.

=== Morocco ===
- Abdelaâli Hadi: known as "The Butcher of Taroudant"; raped and murdered nine young children in Taroudant between 2001 and 2004; sentenced to death and died of natural causes in 2022.
- Hadj Mohammed Mesfewi: known as "The Marrakesh Arch-Killer"; drugged and killed 36 women; executed in 1906.

=== Netherlands ===
- Theodorus van Berkel: raped and strangled two girls near rural North Brabant in August 1941; imprisoned for one, released, and later killed a young boy in 1960; sentenced to 15 years and later died a free man in 1982.
- Hendrikje Doelen: farm-wife who poisoned several people in a poorhouse from 1845 to 1846, killing three of them; died of natural causes in prison in 1847.
- Willem van Eijk: known as "The Beast of Harkstede"; convicted of the murders of five women between 1971 and 2001; died in prison in 2019.
- Koos Hertogs: convicted of the murders of three women between 1979 and 1980; died in jail in 2015.
- Frans Hooijmaijers: known as "Fat Frans"; nurse who poisoned at least five patients with insulin from 1970 to 1975, but is suspected of 259 deaths in total; sentenced to life, commuted to 18 years and released in 1987; died in 2006.
- Aalt Mondria: escaped mental patient who murdered a family of three in 1978; after release, murdered his girlfriend's son in 1997; died 2011 from untreated Hepatitis C.
- Hester Rebecca Nepping: poisoned an elderly boarder, her father and husband in two months in 1811; executed in 1812.
- Michel Stokx: Belgian man who murdered three children around Assen in 1991; sentenced to 20 years in prison in 1992; died of severe burns from an incident during his work therapy in 2001.
- Maria Swanenburg: suspected of killing between 27 and 90 people with arsenic in Leiden in the 1880s; died in prison in 1915.
- Hans van Zon: Utrecht man who murdered three people from April to August 1967, including a former lover; suspected of several other murders; died 1998 from alcohol poisoning.

=== New Zealand ===
- Minnie Dean: Scottish immigrant baby farmer who killed at least three children by Laudanum poisoning and suffocation in the 1890s; executed in 1895.
- Leo Hannan: admitted to three murders in the 1940s while serving a life sentence for a 1950 murder. Died in prison.
- Hayden Poulter: murdered at least three people in Auckland in 1996. Labelled in the media as New Zealand's first serial killer. Died by suicide in 2018.

=== Nigeria ===
- Gracious David-West: confessed to the murders of 15 women predominantly in Port Harcourt in 2019; sentenced to death in 2020.

=== North Korea ===
- Park Myung-sik: known as "The Organ Harvester"; killed 12 teenagers in Sinpo from April to October 1990, so he could eat their livers and supposedly cure his cirrhosis; executed in 1991.
- Wang Chŏng: King who raped and killed women; exiled to Yuan dynasty in 1332.

=== North Macedonia ===
- Viktor Karamarkov: known as "The Macedonian Raskolnikov"; drug addict who murdered four elderly women in Skopje from March to October 2009; sentenced to life imprisonment.
- Vlado Taneski: crime reporter arrested in June 2008 for the murder of three elderly women, with another possible victim, on whose deaths he had written articles; died by suicide in police custody.

=== Norway ===
- Edgar Antonsen: killed at least two women and a young girl from 1962 to 1974, aided by his half-brother in the latter killings; sentenced to life, released in 1988 and died by suicide in 1993.
- Roger Haglund: murdered four people in Tistedalen between 1991 and 1992; suspected of a double murder in Sweden in the 1980s; sentenced to 21 years imprisonment, released and died a free man in 2011.
- Sofie Johannesdotter: Swedish maid who poisoned at least three people with arsenic in present-day Halden Municipality from 1869 to 1874; executed in 1876.
- Arnfinn Nesset: manager of a geriatric nursing home in Orkdal Municipality who poisoned twenty-two residents with suxamethonium chloride over a period of years before being convicted in 1983.

=== Pakistan ===
- Javed Iqbal: believed to have raped and killed 100 boys; died by suicide while in prison in 2001.
- Amir Qayyum: known as "The Brick Killer"; murdered 14 homeless men in Lahore with rocks or bricks when they were asleep; sentenced to death in May 2006.
- Imran Ali: raped and murdered at least eight children, including Zainab Ansari; executed in 2018.

=== Panama ===
- Silvano Ward Brown: known as "The Panamá Strangler"; first known serial killer in Panamanian history; strangled three women from 1959 to 1973 in Panamá Province; released in 1993 after serving a 20-year sentence.
- Gilberto Ventura Ceballos: Dominican man who murdered five Panamanian youths of Chinese descent in La Chorrera from 2010 to 2011; sentenced to 50 years imprisonment.
- William Dathan Holbert and Laura Michelle Reese: American immigrant couple who had the bodies of five other Americans buried on their property; they killed people to obtain their money and property.

=== Paraguay ===
- Agustín Ramón Martínez: known as "Israeli Soldier"; Paraguayan-Israeli criminal who killed, dismembered and burned at least six people in Argentina and Paraguay from 1993 to 2018; suspected of other murders, including his wife in Israel; sentenced to 40 years imprisonment.

=== Peru ===
- Yeyson Liendo Mamani and Sonia Gaona Yaguno: couple who robbed and murdered five men around Tacna Province from October to December 2018; both sentenced to 35 years imprisonment.
- Mail Malpartida Achón: known as "The Cutthroat of Oxapampa"; kidnapped and murdered ten people from 2006 to 2007 in the Oxapampa area, confessed to 21 murders in total; sentenced to life imprisonment.
- Pedro Pablo Nakada Ludeña: known as "The Apostle of Death"; convicted of seventeen murders and claimed 25; sentenced to 35 years in prison.

=== Philippines ===
- Juan Severino Mallari: Roman Catholic priest who killed at least 57 parishioners in Magalang, Pampanga from 1816 to 1826 as part of perceived cure to his mother's hexing. Imprisoned for 14 years and executed in 1840.

=== Poland ===
- Bogdan Arnold: murdered four women in Katowice from 1966 to 1967; also attempted to poison his third wife; executed in 1968.
- Władysław Baczyński: killed a woman and three men in Wrocław and Bytom from 1946 to 1957; executed in 1960.
- Tadeusz Ensztajn: known as "The Vampire of Łowicz"; raped and killed seven women in Łowicz and the surrounding areas in 1933; sentenced to 15 years in prison in 1934.
- Anatol Firsowicz: known as "The Strangler from Podlaskie"; strangled two young girls and one woman during attempted rapes; sentenced to 25 years, released in 1994 and died a free man in 2004.
- Krzysztof Gawlik: known as "Scorpio"; murdered five people with a silenced machine gun in 2001; sentenced to life imprisonment.
- Ferdynand Grüning: known as "The Łódź Vampire"; tinsmith imprisoned for murdering a young girl in 1926, later released and killed two more children until 1938; sentenced to death, fate unknown.
- Tadeusz Grzesik: leader of the so-called "Bureaucrats Gang"; killed between 8 and 20 people in several voivodeships with his gang, mainly owners of exchange offices; suspected of more murders; sentenced to life imprisonment.
- Melchior Hedloff: Rapist who murdered 251 people between 1648 and 1653.
- Joachim Knychała: known as "The Vampire of Bytom" or "Frankenstein"; murdered five women between 1975 and 1982.
- Edmund Kolanowski: necrophile who murdered three women from 1970 to 1982; also mutilated and desecrated corpses he excavated from chapels; executed 1986.
- Henryk Kukuła: known as "The Monster from Chorzów"; pedophile who murdered four children from 1980 to 1990; sentenced to 28 years in prison.
- Tadeusz Kwaśniak: known as "The Towel Strangler"; violent pedophile who raped and murdered five boys from 1990 and 1991; also responsible for numerous robberies; hanged himself in his prison cell before he could be sentenced.
- Zdzisław Marchwicki: known as "The Zagłębie Vampire"; convicted of murdering 14 women; executed in 1977.
- Nikifor Maruszeczko: criminal who killed four men for the purpose of robbery; executed in 1938.
- Władysław Mazurkiewicz: known as "The Gentleman Killer"; killed up to 30 women; executed by hanging in 1957.
- Stanisław Modzelewski: murdered seven women in Łódź during the 1960s; executed in 1969.
- Henryk Moruś: killed seven people in Piotrków Voivodeship from 1986 to 1992; sentenced to 25 years imprisonment; died of probable heart failure in 2013.
- Grzegorz Musiatowicz: violent criminal who killed three men between 2002 and 2014; sentenced to life imprisonment.
- Katarzyna Onyszkiewiczowa: known as "The Female Demon"; habitual thief who poisoned at least three men across Austrian Galicia from 1869 to 1870; sentenced to 30 years imprisonment, later died in prison.
- Szczepan Paśnik: known as "The Polish Landru"; murdered a security guard in the 1910s; fled during the Russian Revolution and returned to Poland, where he robbed, raped, and murdered at least seven women near Warsaw in early 1922 with his wife Józefa; both were executed in 1922.
- Józef Pluta: known as "The Vampire of Marianowo"; killed a neighbor in 1973; sentenced to 12 years imprisonment but escaped in 1979, killing at least six additional victims in two incidents; died under disputed circumstances while on the run.
- Kazimierz Polus: pedophile who killed two boys and one man from 1971 to 1982; executed in 1985.
- Skin Hunters: paramedics and doctors in Łódź who killed patients for profit; the four were convicted and officials are investigating possible accomplices.
- Mariusz Sowiński: known as "The Stefankowice Vampire"; raped and killed four women from 1994 to 1997; sentenced to 50 years in prison.
- Mariusz Trynkiewicz: known as "The Satan of Piotrków"; serial rapist who murdered four boys in July 1988 in Piotrków Trybunalski; released in 2014, rearrested in 2015 for possessing child pornography.
- Paweł Tuchlin: known as "Scorpion"; killed nine women and attempted to kill 11 more to feel better; executed in 1987.
- Wiesław Wiszniewski: together with three accomplices, murdered eight elderly women in Warsaw during robberies between 1998 and 1999; sentenced to life imprisonment.
- Zakrzewski family: father and two sons who killed eight people, including a family of five, around Rzepin Pierwszy from 1954 to 1969 due to their communist leanings; father and elder son were executed in 1972, while the younger, sentenced to 25 years imprisonment, hanged himself in prison.
- Mieczysław Zub: known as "Fantomas"; killed four women the area of Ruda Śląska; died by suicide in 1985.

=== Portugal ===
- António Luís Costa: retired GNR officer from Santa Comba Dão who murdered three women between 2005 and 2006; sentenced to 25 years in prison.
- Luísa de Jesus: known as "The Foundling Wheel Killer"; baby farmer who strangled at least 33 babies in Coimbra from 1760s to 1772; executed in 1772, the last woman to be executed in Portugal.

=== Romania ===
- Ștefan Chiper: murdered three men in Constanța from 2005 to 2006 in order to sell their luxury cars; sentenced to life imprisonment.
- Toma Gheorghe: known as "The Butcher of Arad"; murdered an elderly couple in 1973; sentenced to 25 years but pardoned, after which he murdered three more people in Arad from 1997 to 2003, including his daughter; sentenced to 30 years imprisonment.
- Vera Renczi: poisoned two husbands, one son, and 32 of her suitors in the 1920s and 1930s.
- Ion Rîmaru: murdered and raped young women in Bucharest from 1970 to 1971; executed in 1971.
- Ioan Sârca: known as "The Monster from Valcău"; raped and strangled at least 20 boys and teenagers between 1943 and 1945, selling their clothes at flea markets afterwards; sentenced to life, died in prison in 1991.
- Adrian Stroe: known as "The Taxi Driver of Death"; strangled three women between January and September 1992 near Bucharest, dumping their bodies in Lake Cernica; sentenced to life imprisonment, but paroled in 2018.
- Vasile Tcaciuc: known as "The Butcher of Iași"; murdered victims with an axe and confessed to have committed at least 26 murders between 1930 and 1935; shot dead by a policeman while trying to escape from prison.
- Ion Turnagiu: killed four people during robberies in 1993, including a pregnant woman; sentenced to life but paroled, committed suicide shortly after being arrested for attempting to burn a teenage girl alive.
- Romulus Vereș: convicted of five murders in the 1970s; sent to a mental institution; died in 1993.

=== Rwanda ===
- Denis Kazungu: murdered 14 people at his home in Kigali, arrested and pleaded guilty in September 2023.
- Aloys Tubarimo: murdered seven taxi drivers in Bugesera District from August to November 2007 to steal their bikes; sentenced to life imprisonment.

=== Saudi Arabia ===
- Awdah Ahmad Awdah Salem: known as "The Yanbu Serial Killer"; Yemeni immigrant who raped and murdered three Indonesian housemaids in Yanbu between 2007 and 2009, burying their bodies afterwards; executed in August 2014.

=== Serbia ===
- Baba Anujka: known as "The Witch of Vladimirovac"; professional poisoner who victimized between 50 and 150 people until apprehended in 1928.

=== Singapore ===
- Adrian Lim, Catherine Tan Mui Choo and Hoe Kah Hong: occultists who were responsible for killing a man under the guise of electro-shock therapy, then killing two children in purported black sacrifices.
- Sek Kim Wah: 19-year-old NS conscript who was responsible for killing five people between June 1983 to July 1983 in two separate murder cases, the latter of which became known as the Andrew Road triple murders; executed in 1988.

=== Slovakia ===
- Juraj Lupták: known as "The Strangler from Banská Bystrica"; shepherd who raped and strangled three women from 1978 to 1982; executed 1987 in Bratislava.
- Ondrej Rigo: known as "The Sock Killer"; killed, raped, and mutilated eight women and killed one boy in the Netherlands, Germany and Slovakia, always wearing socks on his hands; sentenced to life imprisonment. Died in prison in 2022.
- Jozef Slovák: after serving just eight years for his first murder from 1978, Slovák killed at least four other women in Slovakia and the Czech Republic in the early 1990s; highly intelligent, holder of numerous patents in electronics.
- Marek Zivala: sexual sadist who strangled three women in the Czech Republic and Slovakia from 1996 to 1998; sentenced to life imprisonment.

=== Slovenia ===
- Silvo Plut: killed three women in Slovenia and Serbia from 1990 until 2006; died by suicide in prison in 2007.
- Metod Trobec: raped and killed at least five women between 1976 and 1978; died by suicide in prison in 2006.

=== South Korea ===
- Ahn Nam-gi: taxi driver who raped and murdered at least three female passengers in Cheongju from 2004 to 2010; suspected in other murders; sentenced to death, commuted to life imprisonment.
- Chijon family: gang of cannibals that was sentenced to death for killing five people between 1993 and 1994; all but one was executed on 2 November 1995.
- Véronique Courjault: French woman who confessed to killing three of her babies, stuffing two of them in a freezer at their family home in South Korea; sentenced to 8 years imprisonment in 2009, released 2010.
- Crown Prince Sado: Joseon prince who raped and killed his palace staff; sealed in a rice chest and died.
- Jeong Du-yeong: killed an officer in 1986; after release, killed eight other people in robberies from 1999 to 2000; sentenced to death.
- Jeong Nam-gyu: sexually assaulted and killed fourteen people from 2004 to 2006; died in hospital after failing to hang himself the previous day.
- Jeong Seong-hyeon: misogynist who killed a karaoke assistant in Gunpo in 2004, then two young girls in Anyang in 2007; sentenced to death.
- Ji Chun-gil: paroled convict who set fire to houses he robbed in Andong from March to October 1990, killing six elderly women in the process; sentenced to life, changed to death, and executed in 1995.
- Kang Chang-gu: raped and strangled six women along rural roads in Gongju from 1983 to 1987; executed in 1990.
- Kang Ho-sun: sentenced to death in 2010 for killing ten women, including his wife and mother-in-law.
- Kim Dae-doo: killed 17 people during house invasions across three provinces between August and October 1975; executed in 1976.
- Kim Hae-sun: violent drunkard who raped and killed three children in 2000; sentenced to death in 2001.
- Kim Sun-ja: poisoned five people with potassium cyanide between 1986 and 1988 for monetary reasons; executed in 1997.
- Kim Yong-won: raped and killed two women and one underage girl around North Chungcheong Province from March to June 2005; suspect in the 1994 murder of a man; sentenced to death in September 2005.
- Kwon Jae-chan: robbed and murdered three people between 2003 and 2021 in the Michuhol District of Incheon; sentenced to death.
- Lee Choon-jae: responsible for "The Hwaseong serial murders"; murdered fifteen women, including his sister-in-law, and raped numerous others; sentenced to life imprisonment for one murder in 1994, and connected to the others decades later. The murders, which remained unsolved for thirty years, are considered to be the most infamous in modern South Korean history and were the inspiration for the 2003 film Memories of Murder.
- Pocheon poisonings: poisonings of three family members with herbicides, committed by a woman known only as "Noh", between 2011 and 2014 in Pocheon; sentenced to life imprisonment.
- Shim Young-gu: stabbed to death eight people during violent robberies in Gyeonggi Province and Seoul from May to December 1989; executed in 1992.
- Yoo Young-chul: cannibal; killed twenty-one people from September 2003 to July 2004, mainly young women and rich men; sentenced to death in 2004.

=== Spain ===
- Andrés Aldije Monmejá and José Muñoz Lopera: responsible for "The Frenchman's Garden Murders"; owners of an illegal gambling house who killed six visitors from 1889 to 1904; both garroted in 1906.
- Francisca Ballesteros: known as La Viuda Negra ("The Black Widow"), poisoned her husband and three children in Valencia between 1990 and 2004 (one survived), sentenced to 84 years in prison in 2005.
- Manuel Blanco Romasanta: travelling salesman who claimed to be a werewolf, confessed to thirteen murders and was convicted of eight in 1853; his initial death sentence commuted in order to make a study in clinical lycanthropy, died in prison ten years later.
- Manuel Delgado Villegas: known as El Arropiero ("The Arrope Trader"), wandering criminal with XYY syndrome that confessed to 48 murders in Spain, France and Italy, including his girlfriend; considered guilty of seven and interned in a mental institution until his death in 1998.
- Joaquín Ferrándiz Ventura: insurance salesman who murdered five women in Castellón Province between 1995 and 1996.
- Alfredo Galán: known as "The Playing Card Killer"; Spanish Army corporal who killed six individuals in 2003.
- Juan Díaz de Garayo: known as "The Sacamantecas"; killed six people from 1870 to 1879 in Álava. Executed by garrote in 1881.
- Francisco García Escalero: known as El Mendigo Asesino ("The Killer Beggar"); schizophrenic beggar convicted of eleven murders, confined to a psychiatric hospital since 1995.
- Ramón Laso: killed his two wives, child and brother in law in order to pursue extra-marital relationships.
- Enriqueta Martí: self-proclaimed witch who kidnapped, prostituted, murdered and made potions with the remains of small children in early 20th century Barcelona (12 bodies were identified in her home); murdered in prison while awaiting trial in 1913. Recent investigations by writer Jordi Corominas and historian Elsa Plaza question the popular version of the black legend of Enriqueta Martí and warned about multiples misinformation, because Enriqueta "was never formally charged with murder nor was any corpse of a child found in her home".
- Jorge Ignacio Palma: known as "The Butcher"; Colombian drug trafficker linked to the murders of at least three prostitutes in Valencia between 2019 and 2020. For the murder of Marta Calvo and his other crimes he was sentenced to life imprisonment in 2022.
- Dámaso Rodríguez Martín: known as El Brujo ("The Warlock"); serial rapist and voyeur imprisoned in 1981 after attacking a couple, killing the man and raping the woman. Escaped from prison to the Anaga mountains in 1991, where he killed two German hikers (one of them was raped); killed by police in 1991.
- José Antonio Rodríguez Vega: known as El Mataviejas ("The Old Lady Killer"), raped and killed at least sixteen elderly women, sentenced to 440 years in prison in 1995, murdered by fellow inmates in 2002.
- Abdelkader Salhi: known as "The 10 Killer"; Moroccan convicted of a robbery-murder in 1988 in Germany, later moved to Spain and killed between two and three prostitutes from August to September 2011; sentenced to 45 years imprisonment for two of the murders and acquitted of the third.
- Gustavo Romero Tercero: known as "The Valdepeñas Killer"; killed three people from 1993 to 1998.
- Joan Vila Dilmé: known as "The Caretaker of Olot"; nurse who poisoned at least 11 elderly patients at a nursing home in Olot; sentenced to 127 years imprisonment.
- Joaquín Villalón Díez: known as "The Gentleman Murderer"; strangled and dismembered his mistress in Andorra in 1981, and later killed two transsexuals in Madrid in 1992; sentenced to 58 years imprisonment, released in 2013.

=== Sweden ===
- Anders Hansson: hospital orderly in Malmö who poisoned his victims with detergents Gevisol and Ivisol between October 1978 and January 1979; his actions were called the "Malmö Östra hospital murders".
- Anders Lindbäck: vicar who poisoned poor people with arsenic, three of whom died; died by suicide in custody in 1865.
- John Ingvar Lövgren: confessed to four murders committed between 1958 and 1963 in the Stockholm region.
- Hilda Nilsson: known as "The Angel Maker on Bruk Street"; Helsingborg baby farmer who murdered eight children; died by suicide in custody in 1917. She was the last person sentenced to death in Sweden not to be pardoned.

=== Switzerland ===
- Roger Andermatt: known as "The Death-Keeper of Lucerne"; nurse who killed twenty-two people from 1995 to 2001; sentenced to life imprisonment.
- Werner Ferrari: child killer who lured his victims from popular festivals, strangling them afterwards; sentenced to life imprisonment.
- Erich Hauert: sex offender who committed eleven rapes and three murders from 1982 to 1983; sentenced to life imprisonment; his case impacted treatment of dangerous sexual offenders in Switzerland tremendously.
- Paul Irniger: career criminal who murdered three people between 1933 and 1937; executed in 1939. Irniger was the penultimate person to be executed in Switzerland.
- Marie Jeanneret: nurse who poisoned six patients under her care from 1867 to 1868; sentenced to 20 years imprisonment and died in prison.

=== Taiwan ===
- Chang Jen-bao: murdered two women and one man from 1993 to 2003, also sexually violating the first victim; sentenced to death.
- Chen Chin-hsing: Gang leader who robbed, raped and killed five people with two accomplices in 1997, sentenced to death and executed in 1999.
- Chen Jui-chin: known as "The Chiayi Demon"; murdered five relatives and one girlfriend for insurance money between 1985 and 2003; also suspected in two other disappearances; executed in 2013.
- Hsu Tung-chih: murdered at least seven people in Taipei and Taimali for financial reasons, including two girlfriends, from 1976 to 1983; executed in 1984.
- Lin Yu-ju: fatally poisoned three relatives in Puli to pay off gambling debts between 2008 and 2009; sentenced to death.

=== Thailand ===
- Si Ouey: Chinese immigrant who was accused of murdering between five and seven children from 1954 and 1958, cannibalizing their organs; executed in 1959. Actual guilt is highly disputed.
- Somkid Pumpuang: known as "Kid the Ripper"; transient who murdered five masseuses between January and June 2005; initially sentenced to life, released and committed a new murder in 2019, for which he was sentenced to death.
- Charles Sobhraj: known as "The Serpent"; killed at least 12 Western tourists in Southeast Asia during the 1970s; imprisoned in India and Nepal. Released in 2022.
- Sararat Rangsiwuthaporn: known as "Am Cyanide"; She poisoned 14 people with cyanide, including her best friend Siriporn Khanwong during 2015 and 2023; in November 2024, was found guilty of murdering Siriporn Khanwong in the first of 14 trials, and sentenced to death.
- John Martin Scripps: an English serial killer who in 1995 murdered three tourists—Gerard Lowe in Singapore, and Sheila and Darin Damude in Thailand—with another three potential (yet unconfirmed) victims.
- Nirut Sonkhamhan: known as "The Pickup Truck Killer"; poisoned nine taxi drivers around Thailand from 2011 to 2012 to steal their vehicles, killing six; hanged himself in jail before trial.

=== Tunisia ===
- Naceur Damergi: known as "The Butcher of Nabeul"; rapist who killed fourteen minors in the Nabeul region in the 1980s; executed in 1990.

=== Turkey ===
- Orhan Aksoy: known as "The Parcel Killer"; strangled five people in Istanbul from 2000 to 2001, then stuffed their bodies in boxes and dumped them around the city; sentenced to life imprisonment.
- Süleyman Aktaş: known as "The Nailing Killer"; killed five people and nailed them in the eyes and head; he is kept in a psychiatric hospital.
- Adnan Çolak: known as "The Beast of Artvin"; killed seventeen elderly women in Artvin from 1992 to 1995; in 2000 he was sentenced to death six times, and 40 years in prison. Death sentence voided after capital punishment was abolished in 2004.
- Seyit Ahmet Demirci: known as "The Furniture Dealers' Killer"; killed three furniture dealers selected at random and because he was sexually abused by his employer during his youth; sentenced to death.
- Özgür Dengiz: serial killer from Ankara, who killed three people, including one of his friends when he was 17, and cannibalized at least one.
- Atalay Filiz: killed three people between 2012 and 2016; suspect in disappearance of his girlfriend in France; sentenced to life imprisonment.
- Ali Kaya: known as "The Babyface Killer"; responsible for ten murders.
- Hamdi Kayapınar: known as "Avcı" ("Hunter"); killed eight people from 1994 to 2018; sentenced to life imprisonment.
- Yavuz Yapıcıoğlu: known as "The Screwdriver Killer"; responsible for at least eighteen murders between 1994 and 2002.
- Özkan Zengin: known as "The Well Driller Killer"; convicted of murdering three gay men in 2008; confessed to killing five.

=== Ukraine ===
- Zaven Almazyan: known as "The Voroshilovgrad Maniac"; Russian soldier who raped and killed three women in Voroshilovgrad; executed in 1973.
- Yevhenii Balan: known as "The Fastiv Maniac"; stabbed and strangled nine women and men around Fastiv from 2006 to 2011, raping his female victims; sentenced to life imprisonment.
- Aleksandr Berlizov: known as "The Night Demon"; sexual psychopath who raped numerous women from 1969 to 1972 in Dnipropetrovsk, killing nine of them; executed in 1972.
- Pavel Bondarenko: known as "The Sevastopol Maniac"; raped and strangled at least five women in Sevastopol from 2007 to 2015; sentenced to life imprisonment.
- Volodymyr Dovgy: known as "The Nova Kakhovka Cannibal"; together with accomplice Olga Melnyk, he murdered at least 9 prostitutes and one male acquaintance in Nova Kakhovka between 1999 and 2004, eating some of their remains afterwards; both he and Melnyk died before their trial could begin.
- Sergei Dovzhenko: killed between seventeen and nineteen people in his native Mariupol for "mocking" him; sentenced to life imprisonment.
- Tamara Ivanyutina: known as "The Kyiv Poisoner"; poisoned people out of personal spite from 1976 to 1987, killing nine of them; executed in 1987.
- Ruslan Khamarov: seduced and murdered eleven women in his home from 2000 to 2003; sentenced to life imprisonment.
- Tavakal Khamidov: known as "The Holosiiv Maniac"; illegal Uzbekistani immigrant who murdered at least 11 people in Kharkiv and Kyiv between 2018 and 2024; confessed to six more murders; sentenced to life imprisonment.
- Anatoly Kondratyev: Russian immigrant who murdered and dismembered at least four elderly people between 2000 and 2004, shortly after being released from prison for a previous murder conviction; confessed to 42 killings in total; sentenced to life imprisonment.
- Dmytro Kulishov: known as "The Troieschyna Maniac"; stabbed a man to death and later strangled his cellmate in 2007; released from a psychiatric clinic and killed another man; acquitted by reason of insanity and interned at a psychiatric clinic.
- Yuriy Kuzmenko: known as "The Boiarka Maniac"; raped and strangled at least 13 young girls and women around the Kyiv Oblast between 2005 and 2009; confessed to a total of 206 murders; sentenced to life imprisonment.
- Oleg Kuznetsov: known as "The Balashikha Ripper"; killed a total of ten people in Russia and Ukraine; sentenced to death, commuted to life and died in prison.
- Volodymyr Nikityuk: known as "The Oleksandriia Maniac"; committed two killings in 1991 and 2001; released early from prison, after which he murdered between two and four additional victims in alleged pagan sacrifices; sentenced to life imprisonment.
- Anatoly Onoprienko: known as "The Terminator"; murdered 52 people from 1989 until his capture in 1996; died in prison in 2013.
- Alexander Polischuk: committed at least 11 murders of women and children, accompanied by rape, between 1993 and 31 December 1994, in Kherson.
- Viktor Sayenko and Igor Suprunyuk: known as "The Dnipropetrovsk Maniacs"; teenagers in Dnipropetrovsk who bludgeoned 21 people to death in 2007 with the aid of a third teenager, often filming their murders; sentenced to life in prison in 2009.
- Pavlo Shulzenko: Cossack who repeatedly raped, robbed, and murdered before being executed in 1740. executed in 1740.
- Serhiy Tkach: convicted of raping and murdering 36 women between 1980 and 2005; claimed the total was 100. Died in prison in 2018.
- Anatoliy Tymofeev: burglar who strangled at least 13 pensioners across Ukraine and Russia between 1991 and 1992; suspect in four additional murders; executed in 1996.
- Vladyslav Volkovich and Volodymyr Kondratenko: known as "The Nighttime Killers"; charged with shooting, stabbing and bludgeoning sixteen victims to death in Kyiv between 1991 and 1997; Kondratenko died by suicide in prison during the trial; Volkovich was convicted and sentenced to life imprisonment.

=== Uruguay ===
- Pablo García Cejas: known as "The Maldonado Murderer"; murdered three acquaintances between April and June 2015 in Maldonado Department; sentenced to 30 years imprisonment.
- Pablo Goncálvez: Spanish-born murderer who killed tennis player Patricia Miller's half-sister and two other women; freed in 2016 but was arrested in 2017 in Paraguay for carrying an unregistered weapon and a quantity of cocaine.

=== Uzbekistan ===
- Polatbay Berdaliyev: raped, murdered and robbed a total of eleven women in Uzbekistan and neighboring Kazakhstan with accomplice Abduseit Ormanov between 2011 and 2012; both sentenced to life imprisonment in both countries.
- Zokhid Otaboev: murdered three of his neighbors' children between 2010 and 2017 to "take revenge on them for mocking him"; sentenced to life imprisonment.

=== Venezuela ===
- Dorángel Vargas: known as "El Comegente"; killed and cannibalized ten men between 1997 and 1999 in San Cristóbal, Táchira; killed four more in prison in 2016.

=== Vietnam ===
- Lê Thanh Vân: known as "The Cyanide Witch"; poisoned at least 13 people with cyanide in order to rob them, sometimes with the help of her husband; executed 2005.

=== Yemen ===
- Abdallah al-Hubal: killed seven people in 1990 after Yemeni unification; fled prison and killed a young couple and three other people in 1998; killed in a shootout with the police after killing one policeman.
- Dhu Shanatir: 5th-century Himyarite ruler who molested and killed young boys; killed in self-defense by a would-be victim.

=== Zambia ===
- Mailoni Brothers: three brothers who killed at least twelve people from 2007 to 2013 in Central Province; killed by police in 2013.
- Milton Sipalo: known as "The Lusaka Strangler"; killed 29 women and girls in Lusaka between January and September 1980; killed himself before trial in 1980.

== Unidentified serial killers ==
This is a list of unsolved murders which are believed to have been committed by unidentified serial killers. It includes circumstances where a suspect has been arrested, but not convicted.

=== Argentina ===
- Madman of the route: allegedly responsible for killing up to 14 prostitutes along highways near Mar del Plata from 1996 to 1999; many believe that multiple suspects, including a gang of corrupt police officers, were behind the murders.

=== Australia ===
- Bowraville Murders: murders of three Aboriginal children in 1990 and 1991.
- The Family Murders: murder and mutilation of five young men and boys from 1979 to 1983. Bevan Spencer von Einem was convicted of one murder.
- Tynong North and Frankston Murders: murders of six women in Tynong North and Frankston in 1980 and 1981.

=== Bangladesh ===
- Hercules: Killed people accused of comitting rapes in 2019.

=== Belgium ===
- Brabant killers: gang of serial killers who operated in Brabant province from 1982 until 1985; murdered 28 people and injured 40.
- The Butcher of Mons: unidentified serial killer who committed five murders from January 1996 to July 1997 in Mons; Montenegrin murderer Smail Tulja is suspected of being the Butcher.

=== Belize ===
- Belize Ripper: abducted, tortured, raped and murdered five young girls in Belize City between 1998 and 2000, mutilating their bodies post-mortem.

=== Canada ===
- Highway of Tears: death and disappearance of at least 40 young women in British Columbia since 1969.
- Toronto hospital baby deaths: deaths of at least eight babies at Toronto's Hospital for Sick Children in 1980 and 1981 were initially alleged to be digoxin poisonings, a theory which was cast into doubt by new evidence in 2010–2011.
- The Edmonton Killing Fields Killer: a unidentified serial killer in the Edmonton and Calgary area who killed anywhere from 5 to 10 people, mainly prostitutes.

=== Costa Rica ===
- El Psicópata: killed nineteen people from 1986 to 1996 in Cartago, Curridabat and Desamparados; suspected of other similar crimes.

=== Finland ===
- Helsinki cellar killer: suspected of raping and strangling three women in Helsinki cellars between 1976 and 1981, including Susanne Lindholm; the validity of this theory has been disputed.
- Järvenpää serial killer: responsible for the so-called "Hausjärvi Gravel Pit Murders"; killed a woman in 1991 and suspected in the disappearance of another in 1993; possibly responsible for other abductions and murders in the late 20th century.

=== Hungary ===
- Main Road 4 Killer: murdered at least three prostitutes and thought to be responsible for the disappearance of another along Main road 4 between 2007 and 2010.

=== India ===
- Stoneman: responsible for thirteen murders in Kolkata in 1989.

=== Ireland ===
- Ireland's Vanishing Triangle: series of disappearances and murders of women within an 80-mile (128-km) area outside of Dublin from the late 1980s to the late 1990s. Due to similarities in the cases, Irish authorities hypothesize that a serial killer or killers is responsible.

=== Italy ===
- Monster of Florence: committed eight murders of couples in a series of sixteen between 1968 and 1985. Giancarlo Lotti and Mario Vanni were convicted of four of the murders, but this conviction has been widely criticized.
- Monster of Modena: murdered between eight and ten prostitutes and drug addicts in Modena between 1985 and 1995.
- Monster of Udine: killed at least four victims in the Province of Udine.

=== Mexico ===
- Femicides in Ciudad Juárez: also known as "The dead women of Juárez"; the violent deaths of hundreds of women since 1993 in Ciudad Juárez.

=== Moldova ===
- Durlești Maniac: ambushed and shot couples around the Durlești area from 2007 to 2011, killing six people; one man was convicted for one of the murders, but was exonerated later on.

=== Namibia ===
- B1 Butcher: murdered at least five women between 2005 and 2007, with all murders related to the National Road B1.

=== Nicaragua ===
- Managua Ripper: alleged unidentified serial killer who murdered six impoverished women in Managua in January 1889.
- San Juan del Sur Psychopath: murdered between two and ten men in the coastal town of San Juan del Sur, from 2000 to 2002; a German illegal alien residing in Managua was arrested on suspicion, but later cleared of the murders.

=== Poland ===
- The Collector: posed as a meter reader to enter people's homes, where he shot and killed at least five people between June and December 1994; a security guard was charged, but later acquitted of the crimes.
- Łódź Gay Murderer: murdered seven homosexual men from 1988 to 1993 in Łódź.

=== Portugal ===
- Lisbon Ripper: murdered three women in Lisbon between 1992 and 1993.

=== Romania ===
- Sălcuța serial killer: murdered at least four elderly women and one man in Sălcuța from 1992 to 1999; a shepherd named Francisc Trombițaș was imprisoned for the crimes, but acquitted of all charges in 2009.
- Vaslui serial killer: murdered four women in Vaslui County from 2000 to 2004; convicted murderer Cătălin Ciolpan is considered the prime suspect.

=== Spain ===
- Almería Ripper: supposed copycat of Jack the Ripper who strangled and bludgeoned to death between five and ten prostitutes across Almería from 1988 to 1995.

=== Turkey ===
- Severed leg killer: murdered eight people around Istanbul from 2000 to 2001, dismembering their bodies and dumping them around the city.

== See also ==
- List of serial killers before 1900
- List of serial killers by number of victims
- List of terrorist incidents
- Mass murder
- Spree killer
