= Massone =

Massone may refer to:

- Massone (surname), an Italian surname
- Massone (company), a pharmaceutical company based in Buenos Aires, Argentina
- Massone, Italy, a village of Arco, Trentino, Italy
- Monte Massone, a mountain of the Pennine Alps

== See also ==
- Masone (disambiguation)
- Massoni
