= Frans Hooijmaijers =

Dutch serial killer

- Born: October 24, 1935; Kerkrade, Netherlands
- Died: August 20, 2006 (aged 70); Netherlands
- Other names: "Fat Frans" "The Good Samaritan"
- Conviction: Murder x5
- Penalty: Life imprisonment x2 (reduced to 18 years)

Details
- Victims: 5–259
- Span of crimes: 1970–1975
- Country: Netherlands
- State: Limburg
- Date apprehended: August 14, 1975

Frans Hooijmaijers (October 24, 1935 – August 20, 2006), known as Fat Frans (Dutch: Dikke Frans), was a Dutch serial killer and former nurse who was convicted for killing five patients at a hospital in Kerkrade from 1970 to 1975, but was suspected to have killed approximately 259 people. After serving 18 years for his confirmed murders, he was released in 1987 and lived as a free man until his death in 2006.

== Early life ==
Frans Hooijmaijers was born on October 24, 1935, in Kerkrade. While little is known of his childhood, he was considered an outcast at school due to being overweight and having a cleft lip, due to which he was often the target of bullying from his peers. Hooijmaijers used to want to be a stage actor, but his father, who regularly beat him, prevented him from doing so. Later on, when his father became seriously ill, Frans became his caretaker until his death, after which he took over control of the family. His bond with his mother deepened, and Hooijmaijers would often give her gifts.

From 1970 to 1975, he worked at the Lückerheide Clinic's so-called 'Nightingale Ward', which was reserved mainly for elderly patients with mental or physical illnesses. He was a chairman of the personnel association and a member of the workers' council, education committee and an exam commissioner. Hooijmaijers was famous amongst his co-workers for his obsession with cleanliness and his devotion to Catholicism, which was showcased by him placing statues of the Virgin Mary next to patients' beds and praying for them, for which he was nicknamed De Barmhartige Samaritaan ("The Good Samaritan"). His most peculiar trait was his claim that he had a supposed supernatural gift, as he could accurately predict when patients would die.

== Murders and arrest ==
During his tenure at the Lückerheide Clinic, a total of 325 patients died, with approximately 259 of them being considered doubtful and 112 considered highly suspicious. The number of deaths was considered highly unusual, as during the same period, only 78 patients died in other wards on which Hooijmaijers was not active. As a murder weapon, he would use syringes filled with either insulin or valium, as those substances were hard to trace and the deaths appeared more natural. When the victim was injected, their brain cells would cease to function properly, altering their breathing and heart rhythm and leading them into a coma.

In August 1975, the family of an 89-year-old woman named Mrs. Braams filed a complaint to the hospital, claiming that her death was highly unusual. An internal investigation was launched, which eventually led to Hooijmaijers. On August 14, he and his wife were arrested, with his guilt further reinforced when the authorities found jewellery belonging to the victims in their home. Hooijmaijers' mother, Maria, would also be arrested on the unrelated charge of poisoning her second husband with arsenic, for which she was sentenced to 8 months imprisonment. During his detention, Hooijmaijers confessed to killing 15 of his patients, but denied the remaining charges.

== Trial, imprisonment and aftermath ==
During Hooijmaijers' murder trial, it was determined that he had an IQ of 93, considered too low to be the head nurse of the ward. Despite initially claiming responsibility for 15 murders and saying that he had done to release them from their misery, Hooijmaijers later retracted the confession, instead claiming that he was guilty only of administering non-fatal doses without permission. He attempted to rationalize this by claiming that he had done it while the patient was either restless or in pain, and that he did not know what to do as there were supposedly no doctors around, attempting to portray himself as the victim. His lawyer also claimed that the high sugar levels of some of the patients were an indication that his client had not tampered with them, which was contested by the prosecutors.

In spite of this, he was found guilty of five murders and sentenced to two life terms and a 23-year ban on practising as a nurse, with the prosecutors claiming that they would seek charges in other deaths. By the time it had ended, it had become the most expensive trial against an individual in the country at the time.

However, the sentence was reduced to 18 years stemming from an appeal in 1977. Hooijmaijers served his prison sentence until early 1987, when he was released and lived as a free man until his death from natural causes on August 20, 2006.

== See also ==
- List of serial killers by country

== Bibliography ==
- Pieter Feller (August 1, 2009). Een kleine geschiedenis van de Nederlandse misdaad [A short history on Dutch crime] (in Dutch). Overamstel Publishers. ISBN 978-9048803316.
- Hieke Wienke Jans and Ralph Schippers (June 2013). Seriemoordenaars in Nederland [Serial killers in the Netherlands] (in Dutch). Crossmedia. ISBN 9789491308079.
