= Abul Djabar =

Afghan serial killer (died 1970)

- Born: Abul Djabar; Afghanistan
- Died: 21 October 1970; Kabul Province
- Cause of death: Hanging
- Other name: "The Turban Killer"
- Motive: Sexual desire
- Conviction: Murder
- Penalty: Death

Details
- Victims: 65–300+
- Country: Kingdom of Afghanistan
- Date apprehended: October 1970

Abul Djabar (died 21 October 1970) was an Afghan serial killer and rapist who killed at least 65 people, and was suspected of murdering over 300 men and boys.

He would strangle his victims with a turban while raping them. Djabar was arrested by police while trying to kill another victim. He was sentenced to death and hanged on 21 October 1970. Two innocent people had previously been executed for the murders.

== See also ==
- List of serial killers by country
- List of serial killers by number of victims
