= Władysław Baczyński =

Polish serial killer

- Born: 1918; Second Polish Republic
- Died: 17 May 1960 (aged 41–42); Polish People's Republic
- Cause of death: Execution by hanging
- Conviction: Murder (4 counts)
- Penalty: Death

Details
- Victims: 4
- Span of crimes: 1946–1957
- Country: Poland
- States: Lower Silesia, Silesia

Władysław Baczyński (1918 – 17 May 1960) was a Polish serial killer who killed 4 people in Wrocław and Bytom from 1946 to 1957.

== Crimes ==
The first victim of Baczyński's crime spree was Anna S., killed in 1946 in Bytom. The next victims were killed in Wrocław ten years later, all of them gunned down. When asked about the motive behind the murders, Baczyński explained that he felt aversion towards people who, due to their character, had a tendency to hurt their colleagues. In his opinion, such people were his victims, who were his subordinates for a long time.

== Trial and execution ==
Baczyński confessed to three out of the four murders, noting that he would've killed even more people. At the time of his trial, he initially tried to simulate a mental illness, but later dropped the act, showing no remorse for his actions. His trial resulted in a death sentence, which Baczyński tried to appeal in the Council of State, but his request was rejected. On 17 May 1960, he was executed by hanging.

== Victims ==
Nmb.	Name	Date of death	Place of murder
1.	Anna S.	18 July 1946	Bytom
2.	Chaim N.	26 November 1956	Wrocław
3.	Józef S.	9 January 1957	Wrocław
4.	Józef W.	18 April 1957	Wrocław

== See also ==
- List of serial killers by country
