= Zokhid Otaboev =

Convicted Uzbek serial killer

- Born: 1988 (age 37–38); Akkurgan District, Uzbek SSR
- Conviction: Murder x3
- Penalty: Life imprisonment

Details
- Victims: 3
- Span of crimes: 2010–2017
- Country: Uzbekistan
- State: Tashkent
- Date apprehended: November 2017

Zokhid Otaboev (born 1988) is an Uzbek serial killer who murdered three of his neighbours' children between 2010 and 2017 in order to take revenge on them. After admitting his guilt to the crimes, he was convicted and sentenced to life imprisonment.

== Background ==
Zokhid Otaboev was born in 1988 in the Akkurgan District, near Tashkent, where he lived in the Khonobad mahallah, a mostly rural region populated by factory workers. He had no prior criminal convictions and by 2010, the 23-year-old worked at a local textile factory like most of his fellow villagers. While working there, he was teased by three neighbours (Abbos Otamurzayev, Shodiyor Aliboev and Zufar Azimboev) who constantly joked about the fact that Zokhid was still unmarried. According to his later confessions, Otaboev took these insults personally, feeling that his manhood was mocked, and as a result, he decided that he would take revenge upon his neighbours by killing their children, making them feel even more humiliated than he himself felt.

== Murders ==
On 12 June 2010, Otaboev saw 7-year-old Shahboz Otamurzayev walking on the street near his house. He lured the boy into his house, where he proceeded to hit him on the head several times, causing Shahboz to pass out. After this, he proceeded to strangle the boy. After killing Otamurzayev, he threw the corpse into a cesspool, which he later covered up so the body couldn't be found. A search was initiated to locate the boy, with Otaboev himself taking part, but after several months, Shahboz couldn't be located and the whole operation was called off.

Four years passed before Otaboev struck again. On 10 August 2014, he lured the 9-year-old deaf boy Yorkinbek Aliboev into his house after seeing him riding a bicycle near his home. After the boy got inside, Otaboev struck him on the head several times, killing him on the spot. In order to get rid of the evidence, he threw the body into a cesspool which he later buried, and disposed of the bicycle in a nearby river. A week later, investigators located the bike but were unable to trace it either back to the boy's location or to his abductor.

After two children disappeared mysteriously from the tightly knit community, a rumour spread around the area that a maniac was abducting and killing children, causing panicked locals to move out of the mahalla together with their families. In 2017, Otaboev would finally marry a woman, a girl named Nargiza, but this failed to prevent him from committing one final murder. In November of that same year, the 3-year-old Oybek Azimboev accidentally walked onto his private property, angering Zokhid. He got out of the house and hit the boy on the head with a kettle, causing him serious injuries. Before he could finish the boy off, Otaboev heard that the boy's mother Mukhlis, frightened by his long absence, had started looking for him. He then dragged Azimboev to his barn, where he repeatedly hit the boy before finally strangling him with a rope. Eventually, Mukhlis knocked on Otaboev's door and asked him if he had seen her son, but he replied that he had been asleep and was unaware that the boy was missing. After she left, Otaboev returned to the body, which he dragged to a nearby cesspool and subsequently buried it there.

== Arrest, trial and imprisonment ==
Three days after killing Oybek, Otaboev was detained by local law enforcement as a suspect in the child murders that had been plaguing the area. During interrogations, Otaboev fully admitted his guilt and then proceeded to show the burial sites to the authorities, who recorded the excavations. After a several-month-long trial, Zokhid Otaboev was found guilty and sentenced to life imprisonment.

== See also ==
- List of serial killers by country
