= Cristina Soledad Sánchez Esquivel =

Mexican serial killer (born 1979)

- Born: 1979 (age 46–47); Nuevo León, Mexico
- Other name: La Matataxistas
- Conviction: Murder
- Penalty: 130 years imprisonment

Details
- Victims: 5–6
- Span of crimes: 2010–
- Country: Mexico
- State: Nuevo León
- Date apprehended: 4 June 2010

Cristina Soledad Sánchez Esquivel (born 1979) is a Mexican serial killer who was active in 2010, in the municipality of García. She murdered between 5 and 6 men, all of them working as taxi drivers, so she was nicknamed "La Matataxistas" by the media. Sánchez also had an accomplice, 27-year-old Aarón Herrera Hernández. A psychiatric examination conducted by the state prosecutor's office noted that Sánchez has an "anti-social attitude" and is "insensitive to the pain of others, shows no remorse and a marked tendency to sadism." According to the report, Sánchez sought revenge "against the male gender" in retaliation for past sexual abuse and a life full of "humiliation, lack of love, frustration and personal abandonment."

== Background ==
Cristina Sánchez was born into a poor family, and was sexually abused in her childhood on multiple occasions. She became pregnant at an early age, giving birth to her first daughter at 16 years of age, naming her María Guadalupe, who was 15 years old by the time her mother was arrested. Sánchez went on to bear five more children – 3 girls (besides María) and 2 boys – the youngest being 5 years old at the time of the arrest. Her neighbors testified that she was a loving and caring mother towards her children.

== See also ==
- List of serial killers by country
