= Vladimir Piniov =

Suspected Russian-Israeli serial killer

- ולדימיר פיניוב
- Only publicly available image of Piniov, taken shortly after his arrest
- Born: 1957; RSFSR
- Died: April 2001 (aged 44); Bat Yam, Israel
- Cause of death: Suicide
- Other names: "The Bat Yam Homeless Killer" "Hannibal"
- Conviction: N/A
- Penalty: N/A

Details
- Victims: 3–5+ (not confirmed, died before trial)
- Span of crimes: 1999–2000
- Country: Israel
- State: Tel Aviv
- Date apprehended: November 2, 2000

Vladimir Piniov (Hebrew: ולדימיר פיניוב; 1957 – April 2001), known as The Bat Yam Homeless Killer, was a suspected Russian-Israeli serial killer thought to be responsible for the murders of at least three homeless people in Bat Yam between 1999 and 2000. Piniov killed himself shortly before his trial was due, and after his death, the bodies of two more potential victims were uncovered, leading investigators to believe that he could've potentially had even more undiscovered victims.

== Early life ==
Born in 1957, Piniov, who worked as a chemist in his native Russian SFSR, immigrated to Israel with his wife and three children in 1993, settling in Bat Yam's Ramat Hanassi neighborhood. Within a few months of arriving, however, his wife fled to a hostel for abused women, claiming that Piniov was abusive and had threatened to kill her on multiple occasions. As a result of this, Piniov severed all connections with his family in the following years and became homeless, developing an addiction to alcohol in the process. Eventually, he built himself a makeshift shack among the bushes in the sandy dunes of the city's industrial area, complete with mattresses and even an improvised Jacuzzi, crafted from an old bathtub with pipes connected to a nearby propeller. His new home eventually became a congregation for other homeless people to drink alcohol and use drugs. In 1998, Piniov underwent a psychiatric examination at the Abarbanel Hospital, where he was diagnosed with psychopathic schizophrenia. Despite the doctors' efforts, he refused any treatment, and since they couldn't detain him by force, he was released.

== Murders ==
After returning to his hut where he resided with his girlfriend, Svetlana, Piniov started to get into arguments with other vagrants from time to time, accusing them of trying to encroach on his property. As a result, he would go on to kill at least three men during such arguments. His first victim was Ukrainian tourist Nikolai Grasimov, whom he strangled to death during the winter of 1999, burying his body in Bat Yam's sand dunes with another homeless man, Alexei Artmanov. Mere months later, Artmanov himself would be killed by Piniov, burying him with the assistance of an unidentified accomplice known only by the name "Buratino" (a Russian fictional character based on Pinocchio).

In July 2000, Piniov got into an argument with Viatslav "Slava" Shwartz, who had recently moved in to live with Piniov and his girlfriend. Both men had been drinking heavily, and in his intoxicated state, Piniov hit Shwartz on the head with a blunt instrument before strangling him to death. After beating all over his deceased companion's body, he dragged it to a nearby tree, where he proceeded to bury it.

== Arrest, confessions and suicide ==
At this time, police officers were investigating a separate homicide case when they randomly stumbled upon the body of a deceased homeless person. Superintendent Yitzhak Gatnio ordered that the case be treated as murder since the man had peculiar marks around his neck, likely the result of strangulation, despite pathologists determining that it had been from natural causes. Coincidentally, a recently detained juvenile offender reinforced his suspicions, when he claimed during his interrogation that the "dead should stay dead and you can't do anything about it." When pressed to elaborate further, the boy claimed that the people he was referring to had been buried in the sand dunes. Those claims were finally cemented when a sobered-up Svetlana came to the police station and announced that her boyfriend, a vagrant named Vladimir Piniov, openly confessed to her that he had killed several people and buried them in the dunes. On November 2, 2000, Piniov was arrested on suspicion of murder.

In his interviews, Piniov admitted to killing either four or five people but struggled to remember the exact count because he had been drunk on each occasion. Despite this, he accurately described where the burial sites were, adding that he would sometimes excavate and even rebury the corpses as he saw fit. His rationale for killing them was either personal arguments or attempts to trespass on his territory. In his testimony, Piniov also mentioned that he had seen another set of human bones, likely that of a female, having been buried in the dunes, but was unable to recall whether he had killed her or not. When asked what happened to his accomplice, "Buratino", Piniov claimed that he had fled to Eilat, but his claims were dismissed by police, who believed that the latter had been killed as well. Due to the sheer brutality of his crimes, Piniov was given the nickname "Hannibal" by the investigating officers.

In the ending months of 2000, a police bulldozer was dispatched to excavate the sand dunes, in search of the bodies of the deceased victims. Piniov himself was brought to the crime scenes to locate the burial sites, and despite his initial denials, he eventually pointed out two of the locations to the authorities. When excavated, two bodies in an advanced state of decay were found, those of Artmanov and Shwartz, were located. On November 7, Grasimov's body was found not far from them as well. Despite the investigators' efforts, no traces of the alleged female victim, or any others, were found.

Prior to his scheduled trial in April 2001, Vladimir Piniov killed himself while in prison custody. A few months following his death, a redacted psychiatric report which included an interview with Piniov was released to the public, which caused a small-scale scandal, as it hadn't been handed over to law enforcement due to the patient-doctor confidentiality laws, with psychiatrists also claiming that it also didn't contain anything that the authorities didn't know already. From it, it was deduced that Piniov felt no remorse for his crimes, was fully aware of his actions at the time of the killings and even identified the two previously unknown victims, but that information had been redacted and made unavailable to the investigators, despite it being pertinent to an open murder case. In 2004, when he was interviewed about criminal he had supervised, Superintendent Gantio talked about the Piniov case, noting that several other homeless people mysteriously disappeared during the time frame that the killer was active. He stated that he "wouldn't be surprised if more human bones were found in the area", and by his estimations, among the animal bones and bushes of the sand dunes, at least a few other bodies remain undiscovered.

== See also ==
- List of serial killers by country
