= Aloys Tubarimo =

Rwandan serial killer

- Years active: 2007
- Status: Incarcerated
- Motive: Robbery
- Convictions: Murder (x7); Theft
- Penalty: Life imprisonment in solitary confinement

Details
- Victims: 7
- Country: Rwanda
- State: Bugesera District
- Target: Bicycle-taxi drivers
- Weapons: Axe; Hammer
- Date apprehended: 26 November 2007

Aloys Tubarimo is a Rwandan serial killer who murdered seven taxi drivers in the Bugesera district during 2007 to steal their bikes. He was caught in November of the same year, and subsequently sentenced to life imprisonment in solitary confinement.

== Early life ==
Tubarimo, an orphan, was born in the Bugesera district of Rwanda. As a minor, Tubarimo was a perpetrator of the Rwandan Genocide. He was sent to prison for his participation in the genocide, but released in 2003. After his release from prison, he began stealing goats and crops from local farmers, but was arrested several times and sent back to prison.

== Murders ==
Between August and November 2007, Tubarimo murdered seven bicycle-taxi drivers to steal and sell their bikes. To lure his victims, he paid taxi drivers to drive him to his home. When they arrived at his house, he would offer them a drugged beverage. If the victim drank the beverage, he waited for them to lose consciousness, and then murdered them with a blunt weapon. After murdering his victims, he buried them in his garden.

Tubarimo would sell the victims' bicycles through his three friends. The first victim's bike sold for Frw12,000, and the subsequent bikes sold for Frw16,000 to Frw18,000.

== Trial ==
Aloys Tubarimo was arrested on 26 November 2007 after a local alerted authorities about his suspicions towards Tubarimo. He confessed to the crimes, stating he committed the murders because he couldn't afford seeds and fertilizer to support his family. However, other equally poor residents of the village could. Tubarimo also confessed that he planned to murder eight people, but he only managed to murder seven.

Tubarimo's trial was held in 2008. Since Rwanda abolished the death penalty the year prior, he was sentenced to life imprisonment in solitary confinement. His lawyer tried to argue that Tubarimo's sentence was unconstitutional, but his argument was dismissed by the judge. The three friends who helped Tubarimo sell the victims' bikes were also charged with selling stolen property, but claimed that they were unaware that Tubarimo stole the bikes. Their fates are unknown.

== See also ==
- Capital punishment in Rwanda
- Rwandan genocide
- List of serial killers by country
