= Rudolfo Infante and Anna Villeda =

Mexican-American serial killer pair

- Born: Rodolfo Infante Jímenez; Ana María Ruíz Villeda; 1963 (Rudolfo); 1971 (Anna); San Benito, Texas, U.S. (Rudolfo); San Luis Potosí, Mexico (Anna)
- Conviction: Murder (x8)
- Penalty: 40 years imprisonment

Details
- Victims: 8
- Country: Mexico
- State: Tamaulipas
- Date apprehended: 21 October 1991

Rudolfo or Rodolfo Infante Jímenez (born 1963 in San Benito, Texas, U.S.) and Anna or Ana María Ruíz Villeda (born 1971 in San Luis Potosí, Mexico) are a Mexican-American serial killer pair, active during 1991, in Matamoros, Mexico. They killed eight women, motivated by sexual compulsion.

They lured their victims, young women, with servant job promises, then raping, robbing, and killing them. They were captured on 21 October 1991, and sentenced to 40 years in prison, the maximum possible conviction in Tamaulipas state at this time.

== See also ==
- List of serial killers by country
