= Durlești Maniac =

Serial Killer

Details
- Victims: 6
- Span of crimes: 2007–2011
- Country: Moldova
- Date apprehended: Never apprehended

The Durlești Maniac is the alias attributed to an unidentified serial killer who shot six people to death in Moldova from 2007 to 2011.

== Victims ==
=== Ştefan Chiorescu and Razan Djaniev ===
On July 30, 2007, Ştefan Chiorescu and Razan Djaniev were walking through a vineyard that they owned when they were fired at by the killer with a shotgun. Chiorescu was shot in the throat and died soon after while Djaniev was shot in the chest and survived.

A man named Andrei Crăciun was convicted of the crime but later acquitted.

=== 2009 attacks ===
The next murder happened in May 2009. A person was found shot to death in their car in an isolated area. They were shot four times in total, the fatal shot went through their head.

Another attack also occurred in 2009. The killer broke into a man's car with a gun. Fortunately, the owner of the car was able to escape without any injuries. It is believed that he was able to escape because the crime happened in a residential area rather than an isolated area like the former attacks.

=== Mariana Jimbei and Valeriu Croitoru ===
On September 10, 2010, the bodies of Mariana Jimbei, 18, and her boyfriend, Valeriu Croitoru, 31, were discovered shot to death near their car on the Leuşeni-Ialoveni-Chisinau route. Jimbei was found completely naked and Croitoru was found face down a few feet away.

Later that year, in November, the killer attempted to attack another couple, but they managed to escape unharmed.

=== Ilie Racu and Olga Câșlaru ===
The bodies of 19 year old Ilie Racu and 15 year old Olga Câșlaru were discovered in a car near St. Andrews Monastery in Durlești on April 1, 2011. Racu, the driver of the car, was found shot twice in the trunk of the car. Câșlaru was shot in the back of the head and found half-naked.

=== Subsequent attack ===
In May 2011, another couple were attacked in their car near a lake in laloveni. The killer smashed their car windows and shot at them. Both people in the car managed to escape alive, with the man being shot in the back as he ran away.

The final known attack happened in July, 2011. A man broke into person's house and shot them four times before fleeing. The owner of the house survived the attack.

All of the attacks are believed to be connected because of their close proximity and a shotgun being used in all of the attacks.

== Suspects ==
=== Alexandru Miron ===
Alexandru Miron, a former soldier, became a suspect in the murders after he murdered his wife, Angela Miron, by shooting her twice with a hunting weapon on August 3, 2011, only a month after the Durlești Maniac's final attack. Miron murdered his wife to start a new life with his mistress, who lived very close to Durlești. Additionally, Miron also matches the psychological portrait of the Durlești Maniac.

Miron was sentenced to 23 years in prison for murdering his wife, but there was never enough evidence to charge him in any of the Durlești murders. The gun he used to murder his wife was never found either.

=== Andrei Crăciun ===
Andrei Crăciun was convicted and later acquitted of the murder of Ştefan Cherescu.

Crăciun was arrested in 2007 and convicted in 2009. During his trial, Razan Djaniev, the surviving victim, was called to the stand where he claimed that the first time he saw Andrei Crăciun was at trial. Despite this, Crăciun was convicted of the murder and sentenced to 21 years in prison.

Andrei Crăciun also claims that the Chisinau police chief Sergiu Cociorvă, The Nisporeni commissioner, Ion Balcan and a police officer named Ghenadie Ababii, attempted to torture a confession out of him, which he never gave.

In 2012, the Supreme Court of Justice ordered a retrial due to Andrei Crăciun being convicted with no incriminating evidence. Crăciun was acquitted by the Chisinau Court of Appeal in 2013 and compensated with 1.5 million lei by the state in 2017 for being wrongly convicted of murder.

=== The Fedoruc brothers ===
Vladimir and Eugene Fedoruc were suspected of murdering Mariana Jimbei and Valeriu Croitoru. However, they were released after 19 months due to a lack of evidence. The brothers still maintain their innocence.

=== Gheorghe Inculeţ ===
Gheorghe Inculeţ was a mentally ill murderer who killed his sister and her two-year-old child. He was admitted to a psychiatric hospital, but escaped on April 11, 2007.

Inculeţ later became a suspect in the murders but it was discovered that he died outside of the Republican Hospital in Chisinau on April 13, 2007, but remained unidentified until May 2012.

== Description of the suspect ==
The suspect is described as having short brown hair, wore military clothes and boots with short laces, and wielded his weapon easily. He is also tall, was between 35 and 40 during the murders, and had an athletic build. The suspect also repeatedly used the word "suka" (сука).

The suspect also may live or work in Buiucani.

== See also ==
- List of serial killers by country
