= Massone (surname) =

Massone is an Italian surname. Notable people with the surname include:

- Carina Massone (1911–1991), Italian aviator
- Nicoletta Massone, Canadian film and television costume designer
- Pier Paolo Brega Massone, Italian doctor and convicted serial killer
- Carlo Massone (born 1941), Italian sailor
