= Abdallah al-Hubal =

Yemeni serial killer (1955–1998)

- Born: 1955; Yemen
- Died: 16 August 1998 (aged 42–43); Bayt al-Faqih, Yemen
- Cause of death: Killed during a shootout

Details
- Victims: 13
- Span of crimes: 1990–1998
- Country: Yemen

Abdallah al-Hubal (1955 – 16 August 1998) was a Yemeni serial killer.

After killing seven people in 1990 after the Yemeni reunion, he was imprisoned in Aden, but was able to flee for a short time. He was not found until the beginning of August 1998, when he killed a couple and three other people in Bayt al-Faqīh. The latter were, according to the police, witnesses of the first two murders. On 16 August 1998, al-Hubal engaged in a firefight with the police killing one policeman and injuring several others before being shot himself.

== See also ==
- List of serial killers by country
- List of serial killers by number of victims

== Literature ==
- Murakami, Peter and Julia: Lexikon der Serienmörder 450 Fallstudien einer pathologischen Tötungsart. 7. Auflage, Ullstein Taschenbuch, München 2001, ISBN 3-548-35935-3.
