= Nikifor Maruszeczko =

Polish serial killer

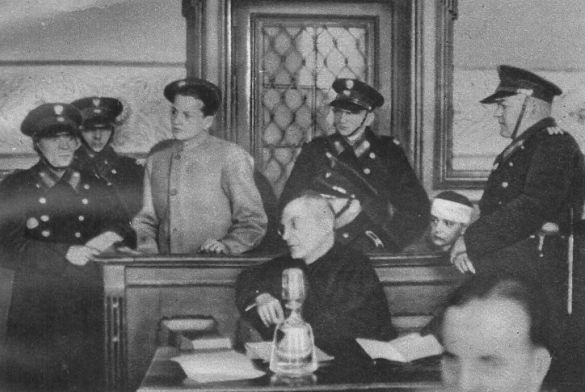
Maruszeczko during the trial, 1938

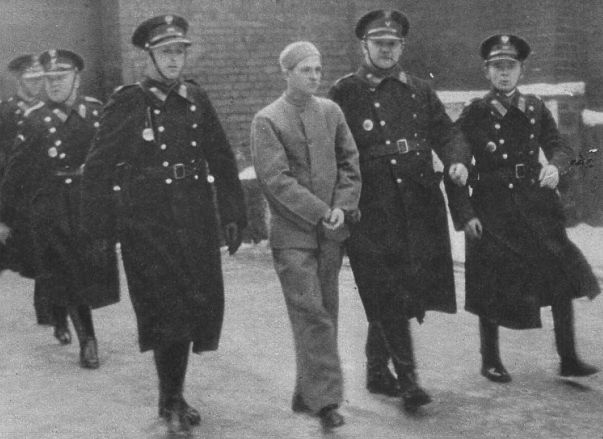
Maruszeczko escorted by the police, on the way to the courtroom, 1938

Nikifor Maruszeczko (15 March 1913 – 8 August 1938) was a Polish criminal and serial killer, considered to be one of the most dangerous criminals in Poland during the interwar period.

== Life ==
Nikifor Maruszeczko was born in the Subcarpathian Voivodeship. He never knew his father and was raised by an alcoholic mother. As a child, he wandered in the neighbouring villages with a backyard band, but quickly entered the crime scene. He was arrested for the first time for stealing a portfolio at the age of 14, for which he was sent to a correctional home.

At the beginning of the 1930s, he went to Upper Silesia, where he quickly gained the reputation of a brutal and ruthless criminal. He committed several murders, mainly on a robbery background. He was on the list of most wanted people in the country, but on several occasions, he evaded police raids. He hid among others in Berlin, where he continued his criminal activity.

He was known for his tendency to abuse alcohol, repeatedly committing his crimes in a state of intoxication. His alcohol addiction contributed to the spectacular end of his criminal career. On 8 January 1938, Maruszeczko made a row in the restaurant "Pod-Orłem" in Bielsko-Biała. Recognized by clients (the newspapers had his portrait printed on them), he tried to escape, but was captured and handed over to the police.

From October to December 1937, he murdered four people, including two policemen. During the trial, he was only tried for killing one policeman and severely hurting another. On 24 February 1938, he was sentenced to death by hanging. The verdict was carried out on 8 August 1938.

== Victims ==
Nmb.	Victim	Date	Place
1.	Jerzy Rother	23 October 1937	Katowice
2.	Władysław Junk	5 November 1937	Kraków
3.	Wiktoria Gałuszko	5 December 1937	Katowice
4.	Henryk Bąk	16 December 1937	Warsaw

== See also ==
- List of serial killers by country

== Literature ==
Based on the book Love, Money and Death by Ryszard Dzieszyński.
