= Wiesław Wiszniewski =

Polish serial killer

- Born: May 15, 1971 (age 55); Dunajek, Warmian–Masurian Voivodeship, Poland
- Conviction: Murder x8
- Penalty: Life imprisonment with possibility of parole after 30 years

Details
- Victims: 8
- Span of crimes: 1998–1999
- Country: Poland
- State: Masovian
- Date apprehended: March 5, 1999

Wiesław Wiszniewski (born May 15, 1971) is a Polish serial killer who, with the help of three accomplices, murdered eight elderly women in Warsaw from 1998 to 1999 during robberies. He was later arrested, tried and convicted for the murders, and was sentenced to life imprisonment.

== Early life ==
Wiszniewski was born on May 15, 1971, in the village of Dunajek, Olecko County, in the Warmian–Masurian Voivodeship. The youngest child in a large family, he was physically abused by his father at an early age.

He committed his first crime at the age of nine, stealing and selling some stamp albums to buy some candy and cookies. As an adult, Wiszniewski moved to Warsaw, where he worked in various professions such as a carpenter, baker, ironworker and lumberjack. Soon after the move, he was sent to prison for numerous burglaries. After his release, he started drinking alcohol heavily and became an alcoholic.

== Murders ==
At the end of 1998, Wiszniewski formed a group with three other people - Grażyna "Duda" Łakatosz, taxi driver Jarosław Byszewski and his girlfriend Ewa Jarzynka - with whom he carried out twelve assaults on elderly women in Warsaw, eight of which resulted in the victim's death. The group would drive around in Byszewski's cab around Warsaw and seek out elderly women with a particular profile: short height (between 140 and 160 centimeters), over the age of 75, and either ailing or living by themselves. Once a victim was singled out, the group followed her until she reached the apartment. Byszewski would remain inside the cab as a lookout, while the other three would enter the apartment under various pretexts. After entering the apartment, Wiszniewski would immediately attack the victim.

He would inflict many blows on the victims' heads, arms and legs, resulting in a number of major facial injuries, and also strangled them. He also restrained their limbs with objects such as belts and stockings; stuffed tissues or other materials in the victims' mouths and wrapped the victims' faces with duct tape so they could not spit out the gag. This latter action often caused the upper jaw prosthesis to move deep into the victim's throat, which cut off the air supply and resulted in death. While Wiszniewski was murdering women, Łakatosz and Jarzynka would ransack the apartment for money, jewelry, expensive clothes, smaller electronic devices and alcohol. The trio would then leave the crime scene and go back to Byszewski's cab, where they would share the loot among themselves.

== Investigation, arrest and imprisonment ==
Despite their organized method of stalking victims, the group were reckless in carrying out the crimes and left fingerprints at the crime scenes, with Wiszniewski leaving his on the duct tape. On this basis, he was singled out as the prime suspect and arrested on March 5, 1999, with his three accomplices being identified and arrested a couple of days later. Immediately after his arrest, Wiszniewski said to the officers that he remembered little about the murders, as he was always intoxicated when committing them. A detailed account of the crimes were instead given by Jarzynka.

On November 22, 2001, the Warsaw District Court sentenced Wiszniewski to life imprisonment, as they found that the murders were carefully planned and cruel. He is eligible for parole after serving at least 30 years of his sentence, with his earliest possible parole date being March 5, 2029. As for the accomplices, Łakatosz received a 15-year prison sentence, Byszewski received a 14-year term and Jarzynka received an 8-year term.

Wiszniewski's lawyer, Dariusz Mikołajewski, later appealed the sentence, but Wiszniewski himself wrote a letter to the court asking the appeal to be dismissed. His life sentence was ultimately upheld, with Wiszniewski commenting that he believed the verdict satisfied everyone.

== List of victims ==
Lp.	Ofiara	Data
1.	Michalina D.	December 16, 1998
2.	Wanda Peszko	December 21, 1998
3.	Alicja Sowińska	January 29, 1999
4.	Felicja Ratuszniak	February 10, 1999
5.	Jadwiga Zalewska	February 16, 1999
6.	Regina Skalska	February 17, 1999
7.	Alicja Krych	February 19, 1999
8.	Zofia Dobosz	February 19, 1999

== See also ==
- List of serial killers by country
