= Louay Omar Mohammed al-Taei =

Iraqi serial killer and Sunni Islam extremist

- Born: Louay Omar Mohammed al-Taei; Iraq

Details
- Victims: 43
- Span of crimes: October 2005 – March 2006
- Country: Iraq
- State: Kirkuk
- Date apprehended: March 2006

Louay Omar Mohammed al-Taei is an Iraqi serial killer and medical doctor accused of murdering wounded policemen, soldiers and officials in Kirkuk while pretending to treat them.

According to police, Louay administered anti-coagulants to pro-Coalition forces brought into the hospital for treatment, to excaberate their bleeding and causing a number of deaths. A police investigation revealed that he had killed 43 people from October 2005 to March 2006. He claimed to be recruited into Jamaat Ansar al-Sunna in August 2005.

He was arrested after Malla Yassin was arrested in early 2006, and confessed to being the leader of an insurgent cell that included Louay.

== See also ==
- List of serial killers by country
- List of serial killers by number of victims
