= Ramiro Artieda =

Bolivian serial killer

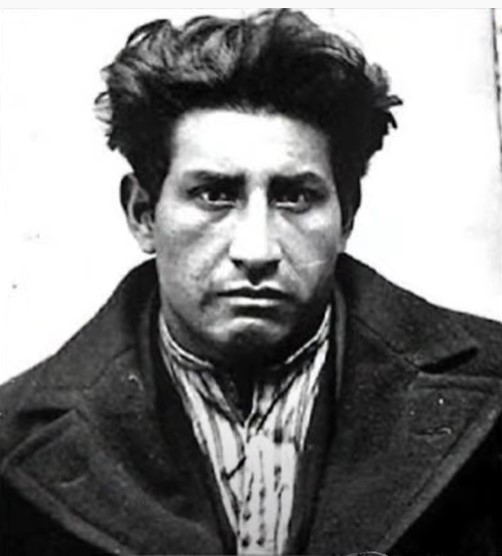
- Born: September 4, 1889; Bolivia
- Died: July 3, 1939 (aged 49); Cochabamba, Bolivia
- Cause of death: Execution by firing squad
- Other name: Alberto González
- Conviction: Murder
- Penalty: Death

Details
- Victims: 8
- Span of crimes: 1920s–1939
- Country: Bolivia
- Date apprehended: May 9, 1939

Ramiro Artieda (September 4, 1889 – July 3, 1939), also known as Alberto González, was a Bolivian serial killer.

== Life ==
Ramiro Artieda's first victim was his brother, Luis. He killed him in the early 1920s when he became the sole heir of his family's fortune and property, and was able to offer his fiancée a higher standard of living. Although he was suspected to be responsible, it could not be proven at first. His fiancée left him because of that. Then Artieda emigrated to the United States and became an actor. At the end of the decade he returned to Bolivia and killed seven young women in Cochabamba, Oruro and La Paz until the end of 1938. All victims were 18 years old at the time of their death and were similar to his former fiancée. He lured, ambushed and strangled them. He changed jobs often, once working as a college professor or a sales representative, and even a monk.

After a young woman escaped on May 9, 1939, Artieda was arrested at his home in Cochabamba, which he had rented under the name Alberto González. He made a full eight-page confession, was found guilty in all cases, sentenced to death, and executed on July 3, 1939, in the courtyard of the Cochabamba prison by a firing squad.

== See also ==
- List of serial killers by country

== Literature ==
- Murakami, Peter und Julia: Lexikon der Serienmörder 450 Fallstudien einer pathologischen Tötungsart. 7. Auflage, Ullstein Taschenbuch, München 2001, ISBN 3-548-35935-3. (Source, unless stated otherwise.)
