= Tadeusz Ensztajn =

Polish serial killer and rapist

- Ensztajn in court
- Born: 1913; Płock, Congress Poland, Russian Empire
- Died: Unknown
- Other name: Vampire of Łowicz
- Occupation: Bookseller
- Convictions: Murder; Rape
- Penalty: 15 years in prison

Details
- Victims: 7
- Span of crimes: February – July 1933
- Country: Poland

Tadeusz Ensztajn (born 1913) was a Polish serial killer and rapist, called the Vampire of Łowicz. In the period from February to July 1933, he raped and murdered seven women in Łowicz and its vicinity, and solely raped three others.

== Life ==
He was born in 1913, conceived as a result of his mother being raped by a Russian soldier. When he was still young, his mother gave him to an orphanage in Łódź, where he also graduated from third grade elementary school. As a teenager, he escaped from the orphanage and began to wander around Poland, during which he was arrested twice for riding a train without a ticket. It is known that during his wandering he worked as a bookseller.

Ensztajn came to Łowicz from Poznań in February 1933. Here, he committed six of the seven murders attributed to him. He would hit his victim with an iron peg or a stone in the head, then rape and murder them. All of his victims' faces were mutilated. After the crime, he wandered through the streets of the city in order to get rid of the traces. When after the sixth murder more law enforcement officers appeared, Ensztajn went to Włocławek, where he killed another person.

Two teens contributed to the killer's capture, who forced Ensztajn to go to a common wedding, during which he told about the crimes he committed. Guests managed to alert a policeman who chased after him. The murderer was captured on the territory of the reformate monastery in Włocławek. Soon he was linked to a series of murders in Łowicz. When he was transported to Łowicz, at the railway station a crowd of people tried to kidnap Ensztajn to lynch him, but the police managed to control the situation.

Ensztajn's trial took place in the district court in Włocławek. Although during interrogations he confessed to his crimes, during the trial he denied involvement and blamed them on somebody else. On 23 August 1934, he was sentenced to 15 years in prison and 10 years of loss of civic rights. The moral negligence of Ensztajn was considered a mitigating circumstance.

What happened to him after is unknown.

== See also ==
- List of serial killers by country
