= Grzegorz Musiatowicz =

Polish criminal and serial killer

- Born: 1986 (age 39–40); Zabrze, Silesian Voivodeship, Polish People's Republic
- Other name: Młody (The Young One)
- Conviction: Murder
- Penalty: Life imprisonment

Details
- Victims: 3
- Span of crimes: 2002–2014
- Country: Poland
- State: Silesia
- Date apprehended: 2014
- Imprisoned at: Correctional Facility No. 2 in Strzelce Opolskie, Opole Voivodeship

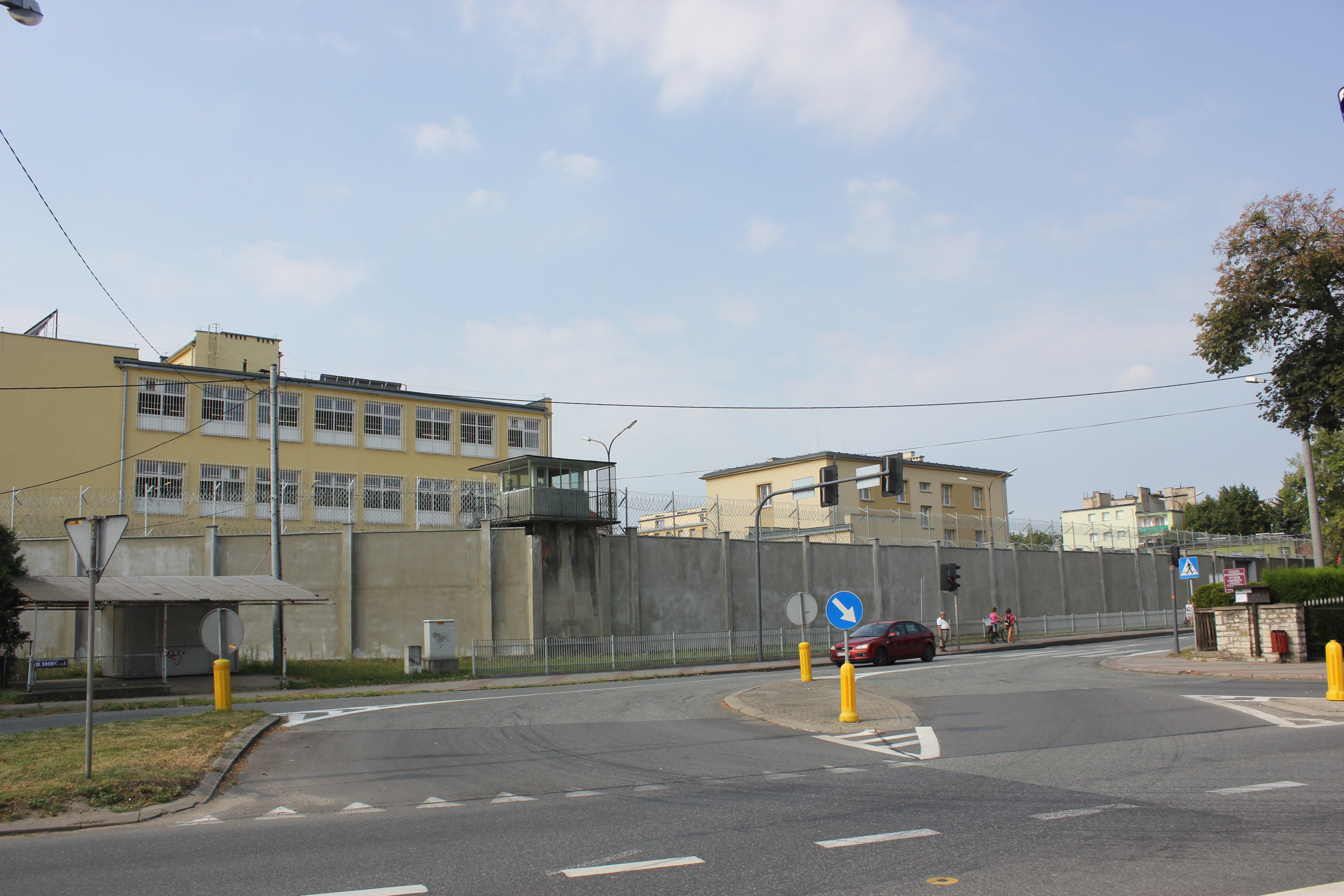
Correctional Facility No. 2 in Strzelce Opolskie, where Musiatowicz is serving his sentence

Grzegorz Musiatowicz, the nickname Młody (born 1986) is a Polish criminal and convicted serial killer, who murdered three men on separate occasions. He is currently detained in Strzelce Opolskie (Opole Voivodeship), where he is sentenced to life imprisonment.

== Biography ==
Musiatowicz grew up in a normal household in Zabrze, Upper Silesia. At the age of 15, he ran away from home and went to Katowice, where he met Tadeusz O., a 52-year-old homosexual who took him under his roof and gave him little money. In 2002, when Musiatowicz was 16, with a context of financial disputes, he hit Tadeusz on the head with a hammer. Leaving him unconscious, the youngster then set the apartment on fire. Tadeusz O. later died in the hospital. Because he was a minor at the time of the crime, Musiatowicz was sentenced to only 6 years imprisonment. After leaving prison, his behaviour worsened, and he began attacking shops. In 2014, he tried to rob a grocery store, terrifying the saleswoman by putting a knife to her neck, but was tackled by a customer. He later said that he was ready to cut the woman's throat if she didn't give him any money: "I consider myself a man without conscience."

He made assaults, always with either knives or an air gun. The psychologist later diagnosed him as suffering from an antisocial personality disorder. "For me, killing a human is like spitting."

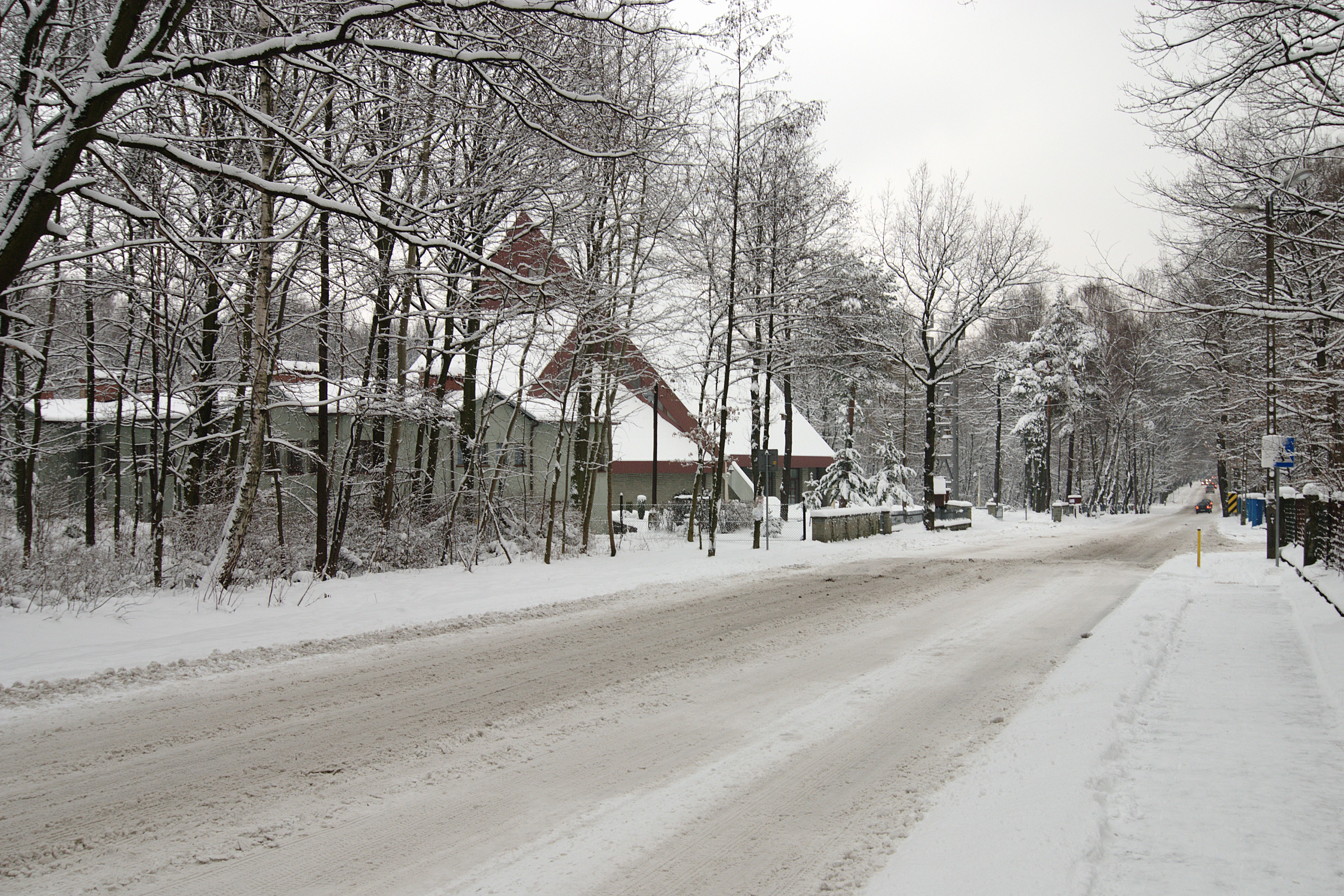
Jaskółcza Street in Zabrze and the surrounding woods, in which Musiatowicz did his two murders

Musiatowicz then made a "jump" in his life, forcefully entering the apartment of a businessman in Zabrze. He beat and tortured the man until the victim told him where he had hidden 90,000 złoty (ca. 18,000 £ or 23,500 US$). However, for an unknown reason, the businessman did not report the attack and Musiatowicz got away with it. The criminal was later detained by police and sentenced to 3 years imprisonment for robbing the grocery shop, after leaving prison only eight months earlier. His parents abandoned him, considering him a bandit, thief and psychopath. He had nowhere to go, and joined a group of homeless scrap collectors who camped in a forest at Jaskółcza Street in Zabrze. The men living there drank anything that contained alcohol. One day, one of them - Daniel, got drunk and went towards the campfire, losing his toes as a result. Eryk O. and Mirosław N., who were also homeless, did not help Daniel out. Musiatowicz told Daniel "they must be cleaned up". In February 2014, Musiatowicz killed Mirosław N. with an axe, and with Daniel's help, buried the body. Eryk O. initially avoided his demise because he was arrested, only to be released two months later. Immediately after, he was killed by Musiatowicz, and again, with Daniel's help, the body was buried near the previous one. Two days later, the police started searching the area, because they had received information about bodies being buried in the area. Musiatowicz was arrested, and psychiatric tests showed he was sane. He had no remorse for his actions. In 2015, he was sentenced to life imprisonment for the two murders. He will be able to apply for early release after forty years, in 2055. Daniel, for complicity in the killings, was sentenced to 15 years imprisonment. Musiatowicz is still considered dangerous, even while in prison: "I do not know if I kill anyone in ten or fifteen years. I don't know what will happen in so many years."

Musiatowicz specialized in armed robberies using a dangerous tool. He spent the majority of his adult life in penitentiary institutions, telling about his crimes in an episode of the documentary series "Life-Given", conducted by journalist Mikołaj Lizut.

== See also ==
- List of serial killers by country
