= Ruslan Khamarov =

Ukrainian serial killer (born 1973)

- Born: Ruslan Rakhimovich Khamarov; 1973 (age 52–53); Berdiansk, Ukrainian SSR, Soviet Union
- Convictions: Murder, Robbery
- Penalty: Life Imprisonment

Details
- Victims: 11
- Span of crimes: 2000–2003
- Country: Ukraine
- State: Zaporizhia Oblast
- Date apprehended: 1 March 2003

Ruslan Rakhimovich Khamarov (Ukrainian: Руслан Рахімович Хамаров; born 1973) is a Ukrainian serial killer, who killed 11 women from 2000 to 2003. He was sentenced to life imprisonment.

== Early years ==
Khamarov was born in the city of Berdiansk in 1973. On his father's line, he had ancestry from the Uyghur people. In 1981, his father abandoned the family, converted to Islam and moved to Makhachkala. In 1985, his mother committed suicide by jumping under a train.

Most of Khamarov's childhood was spent in the orphanage and the vocational school, which he graduated in 1991. At the same time, he was tried for theft and sentenced to 2.5 years' imprisonment. He was released in 1993.

From 1993 to 1997 he lived in Zaporizhia, where he repeatedly committed theft and spent a partial term (from 1997 to 2000) in a psychiatric hospital.

In 2000, he was released and returned to Berdiansk, where relatives had bought him a room, although Khamarov did not work anywhere else for a while.

== Murders ==
In November 2000, Khamarov committed his first murder. The victim was a 47-year-old woman. After this murder, Khamarov focused on younger victims.

Khamarov got acquainted with the victims in the park, in bars or at dance parties, invited them to his house, drank vodka before losing self-control, engaged in sexual contact with the victim, or just started and apologized, then went out into the corridor, taking a homemade knife (sometimes taking a hammer or bottle), returning to the room and inflicting several blows on the victim. Then he would engage in sexual intercourse with the corpse, disposing it in a well afterwards.

According to accounts from former friends, Khamarov did not wash for weeks and looked like a battered ragtag, but this did not stop him from seducing women.

In total, from November to February 2003, he killed 11 women and girls.

The head of the Berdiansk City Department of Internal Affairs Viktor Burmakov had this to say about him:

Khamarov is not a moron, but a schizophrenic. His intelligence is quite high, the construction of phrases is literate. He remembers thoroughly where, what, when and with whom he committed. He easily got acquainted with girls. They voluntarily went to him, had sex. Usually the victim did not have time to resist. He wrapped the body in a sheet, threw it into the well and dusted it. The well is so deep, that even in the heat of winter the water is cold, the corpses lay like in a refrigerator. There was no smell. It's in the middle of nowhere. So there were no signals from the neighbours.

His last victim was Polina Izvekova, a 17-year-old mother. Khamarov killed her on 24 February 2003. Three days later, the mother of the girl contacted the police. On 1 March, a police squad arrived at Khamarov's. Izvekova's body was discovered in the well, but Khamarov said: "There are ten more". He was immediately arrested. Subsequently, all the corpses were brought to the surface.

== Court and sentence ==
The psychological examination recognized Ruslan Khamarov as sane at the time of the murders, and therefore the decision of the closed court (since one of the victims was a minor) which started on 9 February 2004 (the criminal case consisted of 7 volumes), Khamarov received punishment under articles 115 (parts 1 and 2 - killing of two or more persons) and 141 (robbery) of the Criminal Code of Ukraine - life imprisonment.

== See also ==
- List of serial killers by country
- List of serial killers by number of victims
