= Gracious David-West =

Nigerian serial killer

- Born: c. 1980; Buguma, Nigeria
- Known for: Convicted serial killer
- Status: Arrested
- Criminal charges: Murder
- Penalty: Death

Details
- Victims: 15
- Span of crimes: July – 20 September 2019
- Country: Nigeria
- States: Rivers, Abia, Imo, Edo, Lagos
- Location: Port Harcourt
- Date apprehended: 19 September 2019

Gracious David-West (born c. 1980) is a Nigerian convicted serial killer. From July until September 2019, David-West killed at least 15 women, mostly in the city of Port Harcourt. He was apprehended on 19 September 2019. He later confessed to a total of 15 murders.

== Early life ==
David-West reportedly had a tough childhood. Several individuals who knew him claimed that he was an only child born into a polygamous household, but he and his mother lived separately from the rest of the family. He claims that his mother was poisoned and that, as the only son of his father, much was expected of him, but he could not deliver. He claimed that he attended the branch of the Lord's Chosen Church in Obigbo, where he said that he confessed to the pastor that he had been killing women. The pastor reportedly invited him to a crusade prayer service to heal him.

David-West was reportedly a member of the Greenlanders (also known as Deebham or Dey Gbam), a mafia-styled street gang that sprung out of the armed militant groups that are notorious in Nigeria for engaging in criminal acts of violence and Voodoo.

== Murders ==
Although he reportedly belonged to a criminal group, David-West told authorities that he had acted alone in the murders.

=== Reason for murders ===
In a confession, David-West claimed that he had "an irresistible urge to kill," and every night from June to his capture in September, he scoured the streets in his vehicle looking for women. He would proceed to take the victim to a local hotel, where he and the victim would eat, have sex, and then go to bed. In the middle of the night, David-West would wake up the victim and threaten her with a knife. Before killing the women, he robbed them of money, ATM cards, and other valuables. He would then turn the television or the radio on high volume, and using strips of cloth he had cut from the pillowcases, he would tie up the victim before manually strangling her. Victims were often found naked, bound with a white strip of cloth on their ankles, arms, and neck.

He was arrested when, in the early morning of 19 September 2019, a woman who had accompanied him to a hotel woke up to David-West tying her up and preparing to suffocate her. David-West and another individual from Kaduna State were arrested and charged with homicide.

== Trial ==
He was due for arraignment on 22 October 2019 but the absence of his lawyer frustrated his arraignment. However, when the case was called up the following day, David-West pleaded guilty to nine murder charges against him but pleaded not guilty to the charge of attempted murder of the victim who survived his attack. Judge Adolphus Enebeli adjourned till 18, 21, 27 and 29 November and 4 December 2019 for the hearing and ordered that the suspect be remanded in prison custody. On 23 March 2020, David-West shocked people in court when he denied he was the person in any of the images on the front page of the newspaper and on a short CCTV video clip of him in a hotel with his alleged last victim, adding that he did not know what the prosecuting state council was talking about since he had not committed any offence. The judge allowed the video images to be admitted as evidence, but did not accept the copy of the newspaper and adjourned the matter to 27 March 2020 for continuation. On 11 June 2020, the judge gave 21 days to councils involved in the murder trial to file their written addresses and adjourned the suit to 29 July 2020 for the adoption of written addresses.

In August 2020, the presiding judge of the Rivers State High Court sitting in Port Harcourt, Justice Adolphus Enebeli, fixed 9 October 2020 for the delivery of judgment on the murder charges levelled against David-West.

In October 2020, David-West was found guilty of murder and attempted murder and was sentenced to death by hanging by Justice Adolphus Enebeli.

== See also ==
- List of serial killers by country
