= Pier Paolo Brega Massone =

Italian serial killer

- Born: Pier Paolo Brega Massone; Italy
- Convictions: 4 murders 34 battery cases
- Penalty: Life imprisonment

Details
- Country: Italy
- State: Milan

Pier Paolo Brega Massone is the former chief thoracic consultant at the Santa Rita medical clinic in Milan, Italy. In October 2010 he was sentenced to 15 1/2 years in prison for performing unnecessary operations on patients in order to claim payment for them from the Italian state. Seven other doctors at the same clinic were also found guilty at trial.

The judge described Brega Massone as "cruel, malevolent and lacking the slightest sense of human pity". Brega Massone in turn stated that he is "just the scapegoat" and would appeal.

On 9 April 2014, Brega Massone, was tried for 4 murders and 34 battery cases in a different trial, and was convicted to life sentence. In the second instance (19 October 2018), the sentence was reduced to 15 years of prison for homicide beyond intent.

== See also ==
- List of serial killers by country
