= David Avendaño Ballina =

Mexican gang leader

- Born: 1974 (age 51–52); Mexico
- Other name: "The Hamburger"

Details
- Victims: 70
- Span of crimes: 1997–2007
- Country: Mexico
- Date apprehended: February 12, 2008

David Avendaño Ballina, a.k.a. "el Hamburguesa" (lit. The Hamburger) was the alleged leader of "Las Goteras", a gang of prostitutes who poisoned and robbed their clients from 1997 to 2007.

His criminal association operated primarily in bars and restaurants across Mexico City, though they were also present in several other states throughout the country.

== Modus operandi ==
Supposedly, according to detained members of the gang, David Avendaño, along with his wife Claudia Castillos Maya, led the gang.

Las Goteras owes its name to the use of ophthalmological drops combined with intoxicating drinks as a poison to perpetrate their crimes. Their modus operandi was simple but effective: the women belonging to the gang approached the victims and took them to motels, where they were offered an intoxicating drink of high ethyl alcohol content (tequila or vodka) combined with ophthalmological drops that had benzodiazepine or cyclopentolate in the formula. These compounds combined with the ethyl alcohol act as suppressors of the nervous system; those intoxicated with this mixture first feel dizzy and weak, followed by loss of consciousness, finally dying of cardio-respiratory failure.

Several times, victims survived but had strong detrimental after-effects, ranging from an acute hangover, to blindness or anaphylactic shock. For fear of one's public image being tarnished, various survivors did not report their respective attacks.

== Arrest ==
On May 11, 2007, one of the most important cells in the gang was arrested in Mexico City; conformed by 18 people (11 men and 7 women). The detainees mentioned in their statements the existence of more cells and associated the band and referred to Avendaño as their leader. A year later, after several investigations, David Avendaño was arrested on February 12, 2008.

The public was shocked at the news of the existence of such a gang and the victims were quickly demonized. More controversial was that the long list of deaths contained the name of the brother-in-law of the former governor of Chiapas.

== New cases ==
At the beginning of 2009, the possibility of the band's continued action was supposed, despite the affirmations of the federal government that the band was completely extinct.

On February 14, 2009, the corpses of two professional wrestlers were found inside a hotel in the Central district of Mexico City, the cause of death was defined as respiratory failure, traces of benzodiazepine were found in the bodies; a reason why it was immediately attributed to the Goteras.

This event pointed to the possibility that the band as such is still functioning and Avendaño's arrest represented a political strategy to gain credibility with respect to the armed struggle that was and still is developing (it was never fought to Avendaño's innocence, but it was believed that he was just a simple member of the gang and not the leader), or simply a judicial mistake.

In fact, this hypothesis represented a line of research to follow (it was possible that the gang was still in function, but it was a branch of descendant of the first one, according to the government). Although it was not ruled out the possibility were imitators, or simply isolated incidents.

On July 21 and August 12, 2009, María de los Ángeles Sánchez Rueda and Estela González Calva were arrested, the two sex workers who were responsible for the deaths of the two fighters. It was ruled out that they were members of "Las Goteras", it was determined that they were copycats. Both were sentenced to 47 years in prison.
