= List of serial killers active in the 2020s =

Active between the years of 2020 and 2029

This is a list of serial killers who were active between 2020 and the present. A serial killer is typically defined as an individual who murders more than two people with a cooling-off period. The Federal Bureau of Investigation (FBI) defines serial murder as "a series of two or more murders, committed as separate events, usually, but not always, by one offender acting alone".

== Convicted serial killers ==
=== 2020 ===
Name	Country	Years active	Proven victims	Current status	Notes
Rosario Alfonso	Mexico	2018–2020	3	Serving a sentence of 70 years in prison	Murdered at least three women between December 2018 and January 2020. Absolved of a fourth murder.
Kenyel Brown	United States	2019–2020	6	Committed suicide before apprehension	Known as the "Metro Detroit Serial Killer". Robbed and murdered six people from 2019 to 2020 in Wayne County, Michigan, later committing suicide.
Travis Lewis	United States	1996–2020	3	Committed suicide before apprehension	Murdered three members of a family in the same house from 1996 to 2020. After murdering his third victim, he drowned himself in Horseshoe Lake.
Andrey Yezhov	Russia	2010–2020	7	Committed suicide before trial	Known as "The Kashirsky Maniac"; linked to nine sexually motivated attacks against elderly women and young girls, seven of which were fatal. A month after he was arrested, he hanged himself in his prison cell.
Omar Santos Loera	Mexico	2010–2020	3	Committed suicide before trial	Murdered two people with a saber in 2010 and was arrested, but escaped in less than a year. He later murdered his girlfriend in 2020.
Ismael Antonio Sánchez and José Rojas	Argentina	2019–2020	3	Serving a sentence of life imprisonment	Along with two other men, the pair murdered an agricultural producer in June 2020, and were later linked to two other murders which took place between November 2019 and January 2020.
Hugo Bustamante Pérez	Chile	2005–2020	3	Serving a sentence of life imprisonment	Murdered his girlfriend and her son in 2005 and hid their bodies in a metal barrel. Released in 2016 just to kill the daughter of his new girlfriend in 2020. In 2024, while in prison, he confessed to two other homicides.
Lissa María Caiza	Ecuador	2020	4	Serving a sentence of 56 years in prison	Known as "Mrs. Poison"; murdered her children, her boyfriend and a friend using an unknown substance. An additional body was found at her residence during her arrest, but the cause of death was unknown. She is also accused of having tried to murder ten people, including her mother and brothers.
Karel Šťovíček	Czech Republic	1998–2020	3	Serving a sentence of life imprisonment	Caused the death of a pensioner during a robbery; after release, he murdered two women in the Bohemian Paradise area during sexual encounters.
Yuri Sparikhin	USSR; Russia	1980–2020	4	Serving a sentence of life imprisonment	Known as "The Novorossiysk Maniac"; violent recidivist and sex offender who raped a woman and killed another in Krasnodar shortly after being released from prison. Previously convicted for murdering a neighbor in 1980 and two children in 2001.
Diego Ruiz Restrepo	Chile	2020	8	Serving a sentence of life imprisonment	Known as "The Psychopath of Meiggs"; Murdered random homeless people by stabbing them in November 2020.
Harold Haulman	Germany; United States	1999–2020	3	Serving a sentence of life imprisonment without parole	Convicted of murdering three people in the United States and Germany and suspected of an additional one. He lured his last two victims through dating apps.
Omar Fernandez Herrada	Bolivia	2017–2020	4	Serving a sentence of 30 years in prison	Murdered four people, including his cousin, with two accomplices.
Siyamcela Sobambela	South Africa	2020	3	25 years imprisonment	Known as "The Breede Valley Serial Killer". Murdered three female acquaintances and then buried them in shallow graves.
Maina Ramulu	India	2003–2020	16	Convicted; awaiting sentencing	Convicted of murdering sixteen women during three separate murder sprees due to his hatred of women. He has now been charged with the murders of two more women committed after he was released from prison in 2020.
Rustam Kiknadze	Kazakhstan	2004–2020	5	Sentenced to 26 years imprisonment	Raped, murdered two women and set their bodies on fire in 2004; paroled in 2014, but re-arrested for sexually abusing a disabled young girl; paroled on a second occasion in 2020 and killed three more women in Taraz that year; sentenced to 26 years imprisonment.
Wellington Kachidza	South Africa	2019–2020	6	Life imprisonment	Known as "The Tshwane Extortionist Serial Murderer". Illegal immigrant from Zimbabwe who kidnapped and bludgeoned to death six people in Tshwane to extort money from their families.
Maniram Sen	India	2000–2020	5	Convicted of five murders; awaiting trial for sixth	After being released from prison in 2017 for murdering five people in 2000, Sen allegedly bludgeoned a journalist to death with a stone on November 8, 2020.
Adre Baroz	United States	2020	5	Sentenced to five consecutive life sentences plus 140 years	Murdered five people in seven weeks in southern Colorado.
Joshua Dotson	United States	2020	5	Serving a sentence of 261 years in prison	Convicted of shooting and killing five people, including his girlfriend and her unborn child. Representing himself at trial, he stated he was a serial killer and compared himself to Michael Myers.

=== 2021 ===
Name	Country	Years active	Proven victims	Current status	Notes
Kevin Gavin	United States	2015–2021	3	Sentenced to 30 years to life in prison	Killed three residents of the Carter G. Woodson Houses in Brooklyn, where he also lived. He was arrested after using the third victim's credit card. He pleaded guilty in 2026.
Tracy Walker	United States	1991–2021	4	Serving a sentence of life imprisonment	Stabbed three homeless people to death in Rancho Dominguez; previously convicted of voluntary manslaughter in Los Angeles.
Sean Michael Lannon	United States	2021	5	Serving a combined sentence of 95 years in prison	Bludgeoned a man to death in New Jersey and murdered four other people, including his ex-wife, in New Mexico. He confessed to murdering an additional 11 people, most of whom were drug dealers, but his claims have not been substantiated.
Hugo Ernesto Osorio Chávez	El Salvador	2019–2021	14	Serving a sentence of seventy years in prison	Raped and murdered fourteen women and girls with nine accomplices, and is suspected of having raped and murdered a further four to 26.
Andrés Mendoza	Mexico	2001–2021	19	Serving a sentence of life imprisonment	Murdered and cannibalized seventeen women, a man, and a child.
Masten Milimu Wanjala	Kenya	2015–2021	10	Lynched by mob while awaiting trial	Murdered young boys in Nairobi and drank their blood. After escaping from prison, he was lynched by a mob.
Karen Oviedo	Argentina	2019–2021	2	Serving a sentence of life imprisonment	Known as «the Guaymallén poisoner», poisoned her partner Rolando Ángel Aquino and his 9-year-old stepson, Elián Aquino with ethylene glycol (car antifreeze).
Fabricio Eloy Ludeña	Ecuador	2017–2021	3	Committed suicide before trial	Known as "The Undertaker of Dayuma", murdered three men and is believed to have killed a fourth in 2017. While awaiting trial, he hanged himself in his jail cell.
José Tiago Correia Soroka	Brazil	2021	3	One hundred and four years in prison	Fatally strangled three gay men he contacted through a dating app. He is also a suspect in two other homicides; the death of a doctor in 2016, and his former boss, a gay man. He was captured after attempting to murder another victim.
Richard Choque	Bolivia	2009–2021	4	Serving a sentence of 30 years in prison	Convicted of murdering a woman in 2013. He bribed a judge and kidnapped, raped, and murdered at least two more women once released. He had already killed his cousin in 2009.
Shavkat Shayakhmedov	Tajikistan; Russia	1994–2021	5	Died in prison	Known as "The Zalegoshchensky Maniac"; Uzbekistani-Russian who raped and murdered four children and one adult woman in the Sughd Region and the Oryol Oblast.
Dmitry Kazakov	Russia	2009–2021	6	Committed suicide before trial	Murdered security guards and one woman during robberies in Novosibirsk and Tomsk Oblasts.
Keith Gibson	United States	2008–2021	3	Serving a life sentence	Killed a man in a robbery in Wilmington, Delaware in 2008. Convicted of two shooting deaths that occurred in May and June 2021 in Delaware, and is suspected of four other murders that occurred in Philadelphia that same year.
Jason Thornburg	United States	2017–2021	3	Sentenced to death in Texas in 2024. Currently incarcerated on death row.	Convicted of murdering, dismembering and cannibalising three people in Fort Worth, Texas in September 2021. Additionally confessed to the murder of his missing girlfriend in Arizona in 2017 and the murder of his friend in Texas in May 2021.
Themba Dube	South Africa	2021	6	Life imprisonment	Known as "The Polokwane Serial Killer." Illegal immigrant from Zimbabwe who lured six women to isolated areas under the pretense of offering them jobs, where he robbed, raped, and then strangled them to death. Acquitted in one murder due to a lack of evidence.
Kwon Jae-chan	South Korea	2003–2021	3	Serving a death sentence	Robbed and murdered three people in Incheon between 2003 and 2021.
William Marcano Hernández	United States	2018–2021	6	One hundred years and five months in prison	Puerto Rican who shot and killed a father and son in 2018, another man in 2020, and three 19-year-old males in an abandoned park in 2021.

=== 2022 ===
Name	Country	Years active	Proven victims	Current status	Notes
Alexander Kiselev	Russia	2003–2022	3	13.5 years imprisonment	Known as "The Tie Maniac"; strangled two female acquaintances in Perm, using a tie that matched the color of their socks; paroled from a 20-year sentence in 2022, after which he killed another woman in an identical manner.
Necati Akpınar	Turkey	1984–2022	3	Life imprisonment	Murdered three of his wives during arguments in Manisa, receiving a life sentence for the final one.
Nhlanhla Mlotshwa	South Africa	2021–2022	3	Life imprisonment	Raped and murdered three women in Mpumalanga and KwaZulu-Natal.
William Devonshire	United States	2003–2022	3	Died before trial	Murdered a woman in Sarasota, Florida, after being released from prison for a murder he committed in Delaware in 2003. On June 5, 2022, he died in the Sarasota County Jail after refusing to take his medication. Shortly after his death, he was linked by DNA to the murder of another woman in the same area.
Roula Pispirigou	Greece	2019–2022	3	Life imprisonment	Known as "the modern Medea," she murdered her three daughters: the first, a 5-year-old girl, was allegedly suffocated in 2019, a 6-month-old baby in 2021, and finally, her eldest, a 9-year-old daughter, was poisoned with ketamine. She was sentenced to life in prison.
Freddrick Jackson	United States	2020–2022	4	Serving a 50 year sentence	Fatally shot four people in Little Rock, Arkansas.
Jeremy Skibicki	Canada	2022	4	Incarcerated	Murdered four Indigenous-Canadian women between March and May 2022. Found guilty of first-degree murder on all counts on July 11, 2024.
Brenda Agüero	Argentina	2022	5	Serving a sentence of life imprisonment	Murdered five newborn babies and tried to kill eight others.
Tyrone Steele	United States	2022	4	Serving four life sentences	Shot four to five people to death in New Orleans in a 45-day span.
John Mark Richardson	United States	2022	3	Serving three sentences of life imprisonment	Shot three black men to death in Greensboro, North Carolina, one of whom he dismembered.
Sifiso Mkhwanazi	South Africa	2022	6	Life imprisonment	Raped and murdered six women in Johannesburg from April to October 2022.
Malachi Uwem	Nigeria	2022	15	Shot and killed by police during an attempted escape	Leader of a gang who robbed and murdered fifteen people with accomplices. He and another gang member were shot and killed while attempting to escape police custody.
Roberto José Carmona	Argentina	1986–2022	4	Serving a sentence of life imprisonment	Known as "The Human Hyena", in 1986 he kidnapped, raped and murdered a young woman named Gabriela Ceppi. Once in prison, he killed two other inmates. In 2022 he escaped from prison, during which he kidnapped and murdered a taxi driver in order to steal his vehicle.
Andrew Hammond	United States	2020–2022	3	Serving three sentences of life without parole	Shot and killed three men in Fresno, California.
Rease Pence	United States	2022	3	Serving a 122 year and 6 month sentence for two of his murders and a 40 to 60 year sentence for the third murder	Murdered 3 people in Michigan in the span of just over a month.
Alonzo Brown	United States	2022	3	Serving a sentence of 56 years to life in prison	Shot and killed three people, two of whom were randomly chosen, between January and June 2022 in Las Vegas.
Harvey Marcelin	United States	1963–2022	3	Serving a sentence of life imprisonment	Murdered 3 women in New York.

=== 2023 ===
Name	Country	Years active	Proven victims	Current status	Notes
Slamet Tohari	Indonesia	2020–2023	12	Serving a death sentence	Scammed and poisoned people with cyanide before burying them near his home in Banjarnegara.
Efraín Sarmiento Cuero	Colombia	2017–2023	3	Serving a sentence of forty four years in prison	Murdered his two girlfriends between 2017 and 2019, and his wife in 2023 during a prison visit.
Raul Meza Jr.	United States	1982–2023	3	Serving a life sentence	Murdered an 8-year-old girl in 1982 in Austin, Texas. He has also pleaded guilty and confessed to the murder of Gloria Lofton in mid-2019, and the murder of his roommate Jesse Fraga on May 20, 2023. Suspect in as many as ten other homicides.
Juan Carlos Villa	Colombia	2012–2023	11	Serving a sentence of forty five years in prison	Known as "The Dwarf" for his short height. He tortured and killed ten elderly people and one minor.
Kulthum Akbari	Iran	2001–2023	11	Serving ten death sentences and an additional ten-year prison sentence	Poisoned several couples and then stole their belongings in Sari.
Rebecca Auborn	United States	2022–2023	4	Sentenced to four consecutive life terms in prison, with eligibility for parole only after serving 60 years.	Sex worker who killed and robbed clients with fentanyl overdoses, in Columbus, Ohio.
Denis Kazungu	Rwanda	2023	14	Serving a life sentence	Lured 14 people to his home in Kigali, where he robbed and murdered them before dumping them in a hole in the kitchen.
Alexei Varakin	Russia	2010–2023	4	Judged unfit to stand trial and interned at a psychiatric institution	Sentenced to compulsory treatment after murdering two prostitutes in St. Petersburg in 2010. After his release in 2021, he killed two more prostitutes in Moscow in 2023 and was arrested.
Heather Pressdee	United States	2022–2023	3	Sentenced to three consecutive life sentences plus 380 to 760 years	Intentionally administered lethal doses of insulin to nursing patients throughout five Pennsylvania nursing homes. Sentenced on charges related to three murders and 19 attempts of committing murder, while being connected to the deaths of 17 patients in total.
Lucho Plátano	Chile	2022–2023	4	Sentenced to life imprisonment plus 61 years	Criminal who murdered four people in the Santiago Metropolitan Region between 2022 and 2023.
José Leonardo Quevedo Turizo	Colombia	2022–2023	4	Serving a 39 year sentence	Formed romantic relationships with gay men and hanged them in their homes.
Sararat Rangsiwuthaporn	Thailand	2015–2023	14	Serving a death sentence	Poisoning 14 people with cyanide. The victims were friends and acquaintances whom she either had borrowed money from or killed to steal their possessions.
Richard Fox	United States	1976–2023	4	Sentenced to both 40 years to life and 25 years to life	Killed a woman in the early 2000s and two other women in 2021 and 2023 in the Buffalo, New York area. Also admitted to killing his grandmother in 1976, but could not be prosecuted due to juvenile offender laws because he was 13 at the time.

=== 2024 ===
Name	Country	Years active	Proven victims	Current status	Notes
Mark Ford	United States	2003–2024	3	Died by suicide before he could be arrested for the 2024 murders	Convicted of one murder in 2003; confirmed to have committed two more plus one attempted murder in 2024.
Nikolai Ageyev	Russia	2006–2024	4	Sentenced to life imprisonment	Murdered a cellmate while serving a sentence for robbery; paroled in 2018, whereupon he raped and murdered an elderly woman and a young girl in separate incidents; while serving a life sentence, he murdered a second cellmate.
Miguel Cortés Miranda	Mexico	2012–2024	3	Died awaiting trial	Known as "The Monster of Iztacalco"; chemist who raped and murdered young women and teenagers across Mexico City.
Michelle Angélica Piñeda Valdez	Mexico	2010s–2024	20+	Sentenced to 50 years in prison	Nicknamed La Chely or La narcosatanica, she was part of a gang of hitmen linked to the Sinaloa Cartel, called "Los Artistas Asesinos", Piñeda, along with other members of the group, performed rituals satanic in which they extracted the hearts of their victims, with machetes or knives.
David Brinson	United States	1990–2024	5	Sentenced to life imprisonment	Massacred four men on June 12, 1990 and murdered his wife who came to visit him in prison in California on November 13, 2024.
Tavakal Khamidov	Ukraine; Russia (confessed)	2000s–2024	11	Sentenced to life imprisonment	Uzbekistani who strangled and stoned 11 people, first killing a roommate in Russia before fleeing to Ukraine, where he resumed his killing spree. He was apprehended in early 2024 after committing his final murder and was sentenced to life imprisonment in May 2025.
Nguyen Thi Hong Bich	Vietnam	2023–2024	3	Sentenced to death	Motivated by financial gain or family troubles, she poisoned her husband, a niece, and two nephews, one of whom survived.
Karim Selim	Egypt	2023–2024	3	Executed in 2026	Known as "The Tagamoa Serial Killer", he murdered three women in his residence in Cairo.

=== 2025 ===
Name	Country	Years active	Proven victims	Current status	Notes
Todd Givens	United States	2001–2025	3	Sentenced to death	Convicted of killing two people in 2001 and later linked to the fatal stabbing of a fellow inmate at Salinas Valley State Prison while already incarcerated.
Kumarbek Abdyrov	Kyrgyzstan	2011–2025	4	Committed suicide before trial	Known as "The Bishkek Monster"; taxi driver who raped and strangled to death teenagers and young women around Bishkek.
Hiroki Kishinami	Japan	2024–2025	4	5 years imprisonment	Known as the "Grim Reaper" or "Guide to Death". Assisted the suicides of five suicidal people for the purpose of having sex and stealing money, and killed four of them by carbon monoxide poisoning.
Nasr Al Deen Ghazi	Egypt	2022–2025	3	Sentenced to death	Known as "The Butcher of Alexandria". Lawyer who murdered his wife and two clients and buried them on the floor of his home.
Sherif Abdulai	Ghana	2021–2025	23	Serving a sentence of life imprisonment	Known as the "Cristos", "Saani" or "God of War", he killed and cannibalized a total of 23 people in 4 locations in the Upper West.
Andreina Lamota Solís	Ecuador	2022–2025	2	Sentenced to 40 years in prison	Known as "The Sauces Butcher", she murdered and dismembered her mother after she refused to lend her money. After murdering her, she covered up her death by imitating her voice with artificial intelligence. After her arrest, she was linked to the death of a friend who disappeared on January 8, 2022 and the poisoning of her boss on July 21, 2022.
Chang Chieh-tsung	Taiwan	2024–2025	3	Sentenced to death	Known as the "The Kaohsiung Death Note " or "The Taiwan Light Yagami". Strangled at least three elderly women in Kaohsiung and recorded their victims' names in a notebook.
Monji H.	France	2025-2025	4	Waiting for trial.	Killed gay men, often homeless and undocumented before throwing their bodies in the Seine at Choisy-le-Roi from July to August 2025.

=== 2026 ===
Name	Country	Years active	Proven victims	Current status	Notes
Sabuj Sheikh	Bangladesh	2014, 2025–2026	7	Died before trial	Known as "Psycho Samrat"; pretended to be homeless and burned six people to death between 2025 and 2026. It was revealed that he had also committed a murder in 2014.
Kim So-young	South Korea	2025-2026	2	Sentenced to life imprisonment	Lured men to a motel in Seoul and gave them poisoned drinks, allegedly using Chat GPT to make sure the doses were dangerous.

== Unsolved potential serial killings ==
Alias	Country	Years active	Proven victims	Possible victims	Notes
Lansing River Trail Murders	United States	2025-present	0	5	Five white homeless men along a 1.5-mile stretch of the Lansing River Trail were attacked and killed by a possible serial killer over the span of October 2025 to August 2026. Police stated that the attacks occurred when the victims were lying down or asleep overnight. One suspect was in Lansing Police custody and charged for one of the five homicides.
Highway of Death	Mexico	2020–present	71	86–200+	A 136-mile stretch of Federal Highway 85 where, since 2020, at least seventy-one men, women, and children have disappeared or been murdered. The eighteen survivors said that they were abducted by armed men and tortured. It's suspected that cartels are responsible for many of the murders, but there is also a possibility that lone criminals are responsible for some of them.
Highway of Tears	Canada	1970–present	80	80+	A corridor of Highway 16 where, since 1970, at least eighty girls and women, primarily indigenous, have gone missing or been murdered.
Toy Car Murders	Mexico	2019–2023	5	6	Alleged vigilante who killed car thieves in Sinaloa with a shot to the head minutes after stealing. Toy cars were found on the body of all the victims. Due to this distinctive mark, the alleged murderer is popularly known as "El Asesino del Carrito" (The Toy Car Killer) or "El Juguetero" (The Toy-Maker). It is believed that they would be vigilante justice actions by one or more organized persons.
Cuauhtémoc killings	Mexico	2021	5	5	The rapes and murders of five women in Cuauhtémoc, Mexico. The victims were found in vacant lots with their throats slit. One of the victims is unidentified. Mario Alberto Berrios Muñoz, a serial killer murdered in 2023, is the main suspect.
Little Rock serial stabbings	United States	2020–2021	3	3	The fatal stabbings of three people in Little Rock, Arkansas.
Chicago serial shootings	United States	2020	6	6	Six people were shot dead between March and November 2020. A man who was a teenager at the time of the killings was charged in connection with them in 2025.
Fana beheadings	Mali	2018–2020	10	10	The ritualistic decapitations of ten Fana residents.
"Vampire"	Kenya	2022–2024	42	42	A 33-year-old Kenyan man was accused of killing 42 women in Nairobi between 2022 and 2024. After his arrest, he escaped custody and has not been heard from since.

== See also ==
- List of serial killers in the United States
- List of serial killers by country
- List of serial killers by number of victims
- List of serial killers before 1900
