= Ramulu =

Ramulu is an Indian name and may refer to:

- H. G. Ramulu, Indian politician from Karnataka
- Maina Ramulu (born 1976), Indian serial killer who murdered 16 to 18 women
- Mamidala Ramulu, mechanical engineering professor at University of Washington
- Midde Ramulu (1941–2010), Indian folklore artist
- Pothuganti Ramulu, Indian politician and member of parliament
- Potti Sri Ramulu (1901–1952), Indian freedom fighter

== See also ==
- Ramulu Komireddi, Indian lawyer, journalist and politician
- Sita Ramulu, 1980 Telugu-language drama film
