= Capital punishment in Kyrgyzstan =

Capital punishment in Kyrgyzstan has been abolished.

On 5 December 1998, President Askar Akayev established a two-year moratorium on executions, which was subsequently renewed annually.

On 27 June 2007, President Kurmanbek Bakiyev signed legislation amending Kyrgyzstan's Criminal Code and abolishing the death penalty.

On 1 October 2025, President Sadyr Japarov ordered the head of the legal support department to draft a legislation to reintroduce the death penalty for people convicted of violent crimes against women and children. The initiative came as a result of the murder of a 17-year-old in late September 2025 by previously convicted offender Kumarbek Abdyrov. This proposal caused condemnation from UN Human Rights Chief Volker Türk, who urged the Kyrgyz government to immediately halt the advancement of the bill in parliament.

The Kyrgyzstan constitution was amended to state that: "No one in the Kyrgyz Republic can be deprived of life."

In 2025, the Kyrgyz Constitutional Court declared efforts to reintroduce the death penalty in Kyrgyzstan as "unconstitutional".
