= Little Rock serial stabbings =

Unsolved serial murder case in Little Rock, Arkansas

Little Rock serial stabber
- Other names: "Little Rock serial killer" "The Little Rock Slasher" "The River City Ripper" "Jack the Knife"

Details
- Victims: 3 killed, 1 wounded
- Span of crimes: 2020–2021
- Country: United States
- State: Arkansas

The Little Rock serial stabbings refer to a series of seemingly random stabbings that occurred from August 2020 to April 2021 in Little Rock, Arkansas, during which a total of four people were stabbed, three of them fatally. The local police department later revealed that a single suspect, a possible serial killer, was linked to the incidents via CCTV footage, but has not been apprehended so far.

== Murders ==
On August 24, 2020, 64-year-old Larry Eugene McChristian, who was reported missing two days prior, was found stabbed to death on a stranger's porch at 2200 South Gaines Street by a passer-by. Authorities later examined surveillance footage from the homeowner's security cameras, which had partially documented the attack, but were unable to acquire any possible clues to the killer's identity. In the footage, the suspect, who was seemingly heading north towards Gains Street, stopped and stabbed McChristian, before walking away, then suddenly returned and stabbed him again. As the case went cold, his neighbors announced a $10,000 reward for anybody who could provide information leading to an arrest.

On September 23, a friend went to the house of 62-year-old Jeff Welch, who lived at 4218 West 12th Street. To his shock, he found Welch slumped on his front porch, with an apparent puncture wound to his neck. Initially, the case was only regarded as suspicious, but an autopsy determined that the inflicted wounds corresponded with a homicide.

After Welch's killing, no other known attack was linked to the case until April 11, 2021, when 41-year-old Debra Walker was attacked at 1906 South Pulaski Street. Despite being stabbed 15 times and being left to bleed out, she was quickly located by law enforcement and driven to a nearby hospital, where she managed to survive her injuries. During subsequent questioning, Walker claimed that she was walking in an area of 19th and Marshall streets when she was approached by a stranger who pulled out a knife and stabbed her without provocation. According to her description, the man appeared to be a young, black male with a slender build and over six feet tall. Following this attack, the Little Rock Police Department were contacted by the FBI, whose Behavioral Analysis Team made a profile of the killer. Less than 24 hours later, 40-year-old Marlon Anthony Franklin was found stabbed to death at 2710 Wright Avenue, only a block away from where Walker had been attacked.

== Investigation and aftermath ==
After Franklin's murder, police officially announced that they had come to the conclusion that the attacks were likely committed by a singular offender. In the press release, they noted that all of the attacks had occurred early in the morning between 1 AM and 4 AM, against strangers who were walking alone. As a result, police patrols increased around the city and a $20,000 reward announced for the apprehension of a suspect.

The case garnered attention across social media websites and the Internet, and has even led local vigilantes and self-proclaimed Real Life Superheroes, known only as "Tothian", "Master Legend", and "ShadowVision", that they would hunt down the man responsible for the killings.

== See also ==
- Freddrick Jackson, a serial killer active in Little Rock from 2020–22
- List of fugitives from justice who disappeared
- List of serial killers in the United States
- List of serial killers active in the 2020s
