= William Devonshire =

American serial killer (1969–2022)

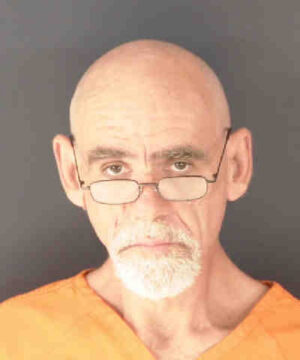
- Born: William Jeffrey Devonshire; September 23, 1969; Wilmington, Delaware, U.S.
- Died: June 5, 2022 (aged 52); Sarasota, Florida, U.S.
- Convictions: Delaware: First-degree murder, reduced to second-degree murder
- Penalty: Delaware: 8 years

Details
- Victims: 3
- Span of crimes: 2003–2022
- Country: United States
- States: Delaware, Florida
- Date apprehended: For the final time on March 11, 2022

William Jeffrey Devonshire (September 23, 1969 – June 5, 2022) was an American serial killer. A habitual criminal with a murder conviction in his native state of Delaware, he became known for murdering two homeless women in Florida in 2022. Devonshire died from medical complications while awaiting trial, but was posthumously linked to both crimes via DNA.

== Early life and first murder ==
Little is known about Devonshire's early life. Born on September 23, 1969, in Wilmington, Delaware, he started committing crimes at age 14 and by the time of his first murder he had accrued convictions for a variety of crimes in the states of Delaware, Maryland, Indiana, Ohio and New Jersey. His rap sheet included crimes such as assault, aggravated assault, disorderly conduct, battery, burglary, and trespassing.

By 2003, Devonshire was residing in Magnolia, where he lived on the same street as 51-year-old Albert C. Harris Sr. On April 6, Harris was found bludgeoned to death inside his mobile home on Irish Hill Road. The murder came as a shock to locals, who theorized that it was likely committed by someone acquainted with him.

Over the following months, Devonshire was imprisoned at the Howard R. Young Correctional Institution on unrelated charges. DNA evidence collected at his home linked him to Harris' murder, and he was subsequently charged with first-degree murder and possession of a weapon during the commission of a felony.

== Release and new murders ==
Despite attempts to delay the proceedings, Devonshire was put on trial, convicted of first-degree murder and imprisoned. For reasons unknown, his murder charge was reduced to second-degree and he was released on parole in 2013, whereupon he permanently settled in Florida. Devonshire continued to engage in criminal activities, and by the time of his arrest, he was homeless and hung around certain streets in Sarasota.

On February 25, 2022, the body of 48-year-old Kelliann Ripley was found near the Centennial Park boat ramp, not far from a wooded area in the northern part of the Tamiami Trail. An autopsy determined that her cause of death was blunt force trauma and manual strangulation. Police initially were hesitant to release details about her case, including her surname, but eventually revealed more when they got permission from her immediate family members.

Not long after, on March 10, the body of 59-year-old Vicky Levitch was found in the vicinity of the northern Tamiami Trail, near Whitaker Bayou. Like Ripley, she had been extensively beaten and manually strangled, indicating to police that the two cases might have been committed by the same perpetrator. As part of the ongoing investigations, Levitch's identity was withheld until a suspect could be arrested in her case.

== Arrest, detention and death ==
Just a day after Levitch's murder, Devonshire was arrested for trespassing and drug possession. While lodged in the county jail, he was obliged to submit a DNA sample as a convicted offender, which allowed authorities to link him to Ripley's murder. On March 28, representatives from the Sarasota Police Department officially announced that he was charged with Ripley's murder, and that he was a "strong suspect" in the then-unnamed second victim's killing as well.

While awaiting further charges, Devonshire refused to take his epilepsy medication, resulting in him being hospitalized on May 17 after suffering from a seizure and hitting his head, causing an intracerebral hemorrhage. Whilst the initial operation was a success, he was put in the medical wing of the Sarasota County Jail, where he would subsequently succumb to his injuries on June 5. As a result, all proceedings against Devonshire were terminated.

In the aftermath of his death, authorities continued to conduct tests in order to determine with certainty whether he killed both women. The testing continued until October 2022, when his DNA was definitively linked to both Ripley and Levitch's bodies, proving that he was their killer.

== See also ==
- List of serial killers in the United States
- List of serial killers active in the 2020s
