= Dmytro Kulishov =

Ukrainian serial killer (born 1975)

- Born: Dmytro Ilyich Kulishov; 1975 (age 50–51); Kyiv, Ukrainian SSR
- Other names: "The Troieschyna Maniac" "The Voskresenka Maniac"
- Conviction: N/A
- Penalty: Involuntary commitment

Details
- Victims: 3
- Span of crimes: 2007–2019
- Country: Ukraine
- State: Kyiv
- Date apprehended: October 2019
- Imprisoned at: Undisclosed psychiatric clinic in Hlevakha, Kyiv Oblast

Dmytro Ilyich Kulishov (Ukrainian: Дмитро Ілліч Кулішов, Russian: Дмитрий Ильич Кулешов; born 1975), known as The Troieschyna Maniac (Ukrainian: Троещинский маньяк), is a Ukrainian serial killer responsible a 2019 stabbing spree in which he attacked four men, fatally injuring one. The case garnered notoriety due to the fact that he had recently been released from a mental hospital, where Kulishov had been interned for a similar crime spree in 2007, where he killed two people and injured ten others.

After his second internment, Ukrainian authorities ordered an investigation into the doctors who approved Kulishov's release, and a review of the country's guidelines for treatment of violent psychiatric patients was ordered.

== Early life ==
Dmytro Kulishov was born in Kyiv in 1975, the only child of a couple highly involved in the arts. The young boy became drawn to ballet at an early age due to his mother, Lyubov, who worked as a choreographer. Aside from this, Kulishov also had a pronounced interest in photography and drawing.

After graduating from school in the early 1990s, Kulishov enrolled at the Kyiv State Choreographic College, which he successfully completed. Upon graduation, he was accepted as a ballet dancer in the National Opera's official troupe, but due a lack of unique talent, he was unable to start his own career.

Around the mid-2000s, Kulishov quit working in the Opera and instead started working as a security guard for a high-ranking official based in Kyiv. He got married at around this time and had a daughter, but his marriage ended quickly after he started his first crime spree, and he later took no part in raising his child. Before the murders, Kulishov was regarded positively by everyone around him, both at home and at work.

== 2007 murders ==
In the summer of 2007, Kulishov suddenly began a series of stabbing attacks aimed at random men he met on the streets of Kyiv's Voskresenka neighborhood. He was conclusively linked to at least 10 non-fatal attacks and one fatal, in which the victim was stabbed 19 times. During his arrest, Kulishov resisted the officers so violently that he seriously injured one of them.

He was then transferred to the Lukyanivska Prison, but due to his aggressive and inappropriate behavior, he was soon moved to the prison's medical unit, where he was handcuffed to a mattress. On 5 July 2007, according to the criminal case file, Kulishov managed to break off a piece of wire and free himself from the handcuffs. He then took off his shirt, twisted it into a noose, approached another sleeping prisoner, and strangled him. When the victim showed no signs of life, Kulishov returned to his bed, put the handcuffs back on, and fell asleep.

The victim was 60-year-old Oleg Orlov, a Russian national and main suspect in a high-profile case concerning the illegal supply of Kh-55 missiles from Ukraine to Eritrea, China, and Iran during the early 2000s. When asked about a reason as to why he killed Orlov, Kulishov simply stated that his constant snoring was bothering him.

=== Internment ===
Orlov's death soon became known to the human rights organization International League for the Protection of the Rights of Citizens of Ukraine, which publicized the circumstances of the man's death. As a result, the Department of Corrections began an internal investigation that led to several officials at the Lukyanivska Prison to be charged with criminal negligence, while its warden was dismissed.

After killing Orlov, Kulishov was ordered to undergo a forensic psychiatric examination, which concluded that he was incapable of standing trial. On this basis, in late 2007, the Kyiv Court of Appeals acquitted Kulishov by reason of insanity and interned him at a specialized psychiatric clinic in Dnipropetrovsk. In the 2010s, he was transferred to another facility in Hlevakha.

During his internment at both facilities, Kulishov was labeled as a particularly dangerous patient who often behaved aggressively towards everyone around him. According to his attending physicians, his depressive states would suddenly turn into violent manic episodes, during which Kulishov threatened to kill anybody who crossed paths with him. He underwent an evaluation by a medical commission every six months, but for several years, his treatment was considered ineffective and he was denied release.

In March 2019, Kulishov was yet again denied release, as the commission found him to be mentally unstable and still posing a danger to society. However, just two months later, the commission changed their minds for unknown reasons and decided to recommend him for outpatient treatment. After examining the provided documents, the Kyiv Court of Appeals ordered his release in June 2019, after which Kulishov moved in with his parents. As part of his treatment, he was registered with a psychiatrist and was ordered to regularly take his prescribed medication.

== 2019 crimes ==
Mere months after his release, Kulishov started a new crime spree that lasted from September to October 2019, all of which took place in the Vyhurivshchyna-Troieshchyna neighborhood. All attacks were committed late at night between approximately 8 and 10 PM, with the victims being attacked from behind with a knife – the weapon, covered in blood, was found in Kulishov's parents' apartment after his arrest. A distuinguishing feature was that, according to his surviving victims, Kulishov made eerie or strange vocalizations while approaching them – one victim described him clucking like a chicken before the attack.

The first attack took place in early September, when Kulishov stabbed a 26-year-old man several times. The victim was hospitalized, and suffered cuts to his shoulder and collarbone. A few days later, Kulishov attacked a 22-year-old man on Raduzhnaya Street, inflicting a serious wound on the victim's neck. Two days after that, he attacked a 56-year-old man, who also survived the assault.

The final attack took place on Vershyhora Street in October 2019, when Kulishov attacked a 69-year-old man. Unlike the previous victims, the injuries proved fatal, and the man succumbed to them not long after he was struck.

=== Investigation and hysteria ===
The stabbing caused mass panic among the city's residents, and misinformation began to rapidly spread over the course of a week. Rumors on social media claimed that the so-called "Troieschyna Maniac" had committed about 10 murders, and any incident involving elderly men was attributed to the unknown perpetrator. Witnesses claimed to have seen a younger man murder an elderly pensioner, but it later turned out that the man had actually fallen ill due to health issues. A number of Ukrainian media outlets baselessly claimed that the Maniac had killed a young girl, but it was later clarified that this killing took place in Russia.

During the investigation into the stabbings, reinforced police units actively patrolled the streets, interviewed locals, and reviewed CCTV footage and dashcams. A facial composite of the suspect was developed from survivors' testimony, which was later found to closely resemble Kulishov. Aside from the Kyiv police force, concerned residents of the affected areas also formed patrol groups in an attempt to catch the killer themselves.

In several instances, innocent people were wrongfully accused and even assaulted because people thought they were the Troieschyna Maniac. In one case, a man who closely resembled the facial composite and was found with a knife in his personal belongings was severely beaten, but after officers questioned it him, the man was ruled out and let go. In addition, Kyiv residents began spreading thousands of messages on social media about the criminal supposedly being spotted in different parts of the city and even beyond its borders, forcing law enforcement agencies to check these leads, most of which proved fruitless.

== Arrest and internment ==
In mid-October 2019, Kulishov was identified as a potential suspect due to the fact that he had committed similar crimes in the past. He was detained and put before a police lineup, where he was positively identified by surviving victims. When authorities obtained a search warrant for his parents' apartment, they located several personal items and knives that were taken in for examination.

During his first interrogation, Kulishov willingly admitted guilt and confessed to all of the attacks, claiming that he exclusively targeted men based on his own personal criteria and denying that he ever harmed women or children in any way. However, in the following days, he recanted and proclaimed his innocence. He was supported by his mother and lawyers, but when asked to present an alibi for her son, Lyubov Kulishova was unable to tell where he was or what he was doing at the time of the crimes.

On 18 October 2019, at the request of the Kyiv Prosecutor's Office, the Dnipro District Court imposed a preventive measure on Kulishov and ordered him detained at a psychiatric clinic until the end of December. Due to his outbursts, he was placed under strict supervision, and later returned to the clinic in Hlevakha.

During this period, he underwent a second forensic psychiatric examination, which concluded that he suffered from a severe form of schizophrenia that made him incapable of understanding the gravity of his actions. As a result, in early 2020, Kulishov was acquitted by reason of insanity and interned at the psychiatric clinic in Hlevakha, where he is undergoing intensive treatment.

=== Criminal proceedings against medical personnel ===
The medical commission's sudden and unexplained decision to release Kulishov came under heavy scrutiny after his arrest, leading for calls from public officials like lawyer Andriy Irklienko for the doctors who allowed it to be charged and for the evaluation system for patients to be reworked.

Nadezhda Maksimets, spokesperson for the Kyiv Prosecutor's Office, later released a statement in which she said that the clinic's documentation would be seized and examined as part of criminal proceedings.

== See also ==
- Alexei Varakin – similar case involving a violent offender with mental issues
- List of serial killers by country
