= Rustam Kiknadze =

Kazakhstani serial killer and rapist (born 1980)

- Born: Rustam Musadinovich Kiknadze; 21 December 1980; Dzhambul Region, Kazakh SSR (present-day Jambyl Region, Kazakhstan)
- Convictions: Murder x5 Rape; Robbery
- Penalty: 16 years, commuted to 14 years (2004); 7 years and 6 months, commuted to 8 years (2014); 26 years (2021)

Details
- Victims: 5
- Span of crimes: 2004; October 27 – November 26, 2020
- Country: Kazakhstan
- State: Jambyl
- Date apprehended: For the final time in November 2020

Rustam Musadinovich Kiknadze (Russian: Рустам Мусадинович Кикнадзе; born 21 December 1980) is a Kazakhstani serial killer and rapist who murdered three women over twenty days in the Jambyl Region in 2020. His case garnered great controversy among locals, as he was a known violent offender who had previous convictions for a double murder and raping underage children, in addition to his relatively lenient sentence of 26 years for his latest killings.

== Initial crimes ==
Nothing is known of Kiknadze's life prior to his first major crimes, aside that he was born in 1980 an unspecified area of the Jambyl Region.

In 2004, he raped and killed two women, burning their bodies post-mortem, but was swiftly arrested and put on trial. For reasons unclear, he was acquitted of the rape charge and tried only for the murders, for which he was sentenced to 14 years imprisonment by the Jambyl Regional Court.

On August 15, 2013, Kiknadze was released on parole following an order by the Baizak District Court. Not long after, he was arrested yet again for sexually abusing an underage girl with cerebral palsy in the Karaganda Region and forcing her friend to rape her under the threat of death. Despite the severity of his crimes, Kiknadze was given another lenient sentence of only 7 years and 6 months imprisonment, later increased to 8 years.

== Release and new murders ==
Sometime in mid-2020, the Abay District Court ordered that Kiknadze be released on parole. Upon doing so, he moved to Taraz, where he spent most of his time living on the streets and drinking alcohol. On October 22, he resumed his criminal activities by assaulting a random woman and stealing her wallet.

While hanging around Taraz, Kiknadze got acquainted with 46-year-old Nikolai Demin, with the latter inviting him over to his apartment, where they got drunk together. At one point, Demin told Kiknadze that they could invite his 48-year-old neighbor Natalya Budzinovskaya to join them, but when they knocked on her door, she said that she was not interested. Demin would eventually return to his apartment, but Kiknadze briefly left, got even more inebriated and eventually returned, forcing his way into the woman's apartment. Upon doing so, he raped and viciously stabbed her to death.

After killing Budzinovskaya, Kiknadze locked the apartment from the inside and left the apartment through a window. Her body was eventually found after her mother hired a cleaner to check on her daughter, whereupon the man found her body and reported it to the police. To the relatives' dismay, her death was initially ruled as alcohol poisoning, despite the fact that Budzinovskaya had her panties lowered to her knees, some bedding had been stolen and there was blood all over the walls and furniture. Her mother told of this to a prominent local reporter, who eventually managed to convince the local police department to re-examine the crime scene - upon doing so, they confirmed that Budzinovskaya had been murdered and launched a homicide investigation.

In the meantime, Kiknadze continued with his crime spree, robbing a man on October 29. On November 16, he got drunk again and found himself in the company of a local bully who brought him to a house occupied by two women: 48-year-old Zhanna Musabekova and 77-year-old Valentina Lashchukhina. The other man left at some point, but Kiknadze stayed behind and proceeded to rape Musabekova in front of Lashchukhina before stabbing her to death. Upon finishing her off, he turned his attention to the elderly woman, whom he stabbed once, killing her instantly.

== Arrest, trial and sentence ==
Sometime in late November, Kiknadze was linked to the recent crimes and arrested. When questioned, he claimed that he was involved in the murders, but initially claimed to be a mere accomplice and lover of Budzinovskaya, before ultimately admitting to being the sole murderer. His arrest led to criticism and backlash against the local police department and the courts' handling of the violent offender and his frequent paroles, to which the Deputy Head of the Jambyl Regional Criminal Police Department released a statement acknowledging that his and his colleagues' mistakes led to this scenario.

On May 21, 2021, Kiknadze's trial for the three murders and the related crimes began in the Jambyl District Court. After an eleven-day long trial, Kiknadze was found guilty on all counts - however, despite the prosecutors requesting a full life term due to the brutality of his crimes, the court instead sentenced him to 26 years imprisonment instead. This decision was met with heavy criticism from the victims' family members, one of whom later released a statement saying that her faith in the Kazakhstani justice system was lost and that she would appeal the decision.

== See also ==
- List of serial killers by country
- List of serial killers active in the 2020s
