= Jason Thornburg =

American serial killer from Texas

Jason Alan Thornburg
- Born: August 27, 1980 (age 46); Cerritos, California, U.S.
- Conviction: Capital murder (x3)
- Penalty: Death

Details
- Victims: 3 convicted, 5 confessed
- Date: 2017–2021
- Locations: Texas, Arizona
- Imprisoned at: Polunsky Unit

Jason Alan Thornburg (born August 27, 1980) is an American convicted serial killer who was charged in December 2021 with the dismemberment and murders of David Lueras, Lauren Phillips and Maricruz Mathis, in Fort Worth, Texas. Thornburg additionally confessed to murdering his girlfriend, Tanya Begay, in Arizona in 2017 and his former roommate, Mark Jewell, in Texas in May 2021.

During the investigations and trial for the 2021 Fort Worth murders, Thornburg testified that he committed the triple slayings for ritualistic sacrifices, and even engaged in cannibalism. Thornburg was found guilty of all three counts of capital murder on November 20, 2024, and sentenced to death on December 4, 2024.

== 2021 Fort Worth murders ==
Over a one-week period in September 2021, Jason Alan Thornburg murdered three people and dismembered their bodies at a local inn in Euless, a suburb of Fort Worth, Texas.

Thornburg, then an electrician's apprentice, reportedly had the thought to "commit sacrifices" for God through his reading and interpretation of the Bible, which served as a motivation behind the murders he committed. Although the exact date of the murders was not revealed publicly, it was speculated that the first murder happened between September 15 and 17. Thornburg killed 42-year-old David Lueras, who shared the same room as Thornburg; Thornburg himself had resided at the inn since July 2021. Thornburg was said to have slit Lueras' throat before he cut up his body into pieces. He also ate a part of Lueras's heart.

During the next four days, Thornburg murdered two women, 34-year-old Lauren Phillips and 33-year-old Maricruz Mathis. According to Thornburg, he killed one of the female victims by slitting her throat two days after the murder of Lueras. Two days later, he murdered the other woman by strangling and stabbing her to death. Thornberg butchered each corpse and kept the body parts in a storage bin. He also engaged in cannibalism by consuming some of the women's body parts and even engaged in sex with the corpse of Phillips before dismembering it.

After committing the three murders, Thornburg brought the body parts to a nearby dumpster and set a fire to dispose of the body parts. The fire alerted the residents and authorities, leading to Thornburg's arrest.

== Arrest and confession ==
=== Capture ===
The bodies of the three victims were found on September 22, 2021, when the police responded to a report of a fire breaking out at a dumpster nearby the place Thornburg was staying.

At the first stage of investigations, the police were able to identify David Lueras, but they failed to immediately identify the corpses of the two female victims, both of whom they believed to be a child and teenager at first before discovering they were both adult females. Thornburg was arrested on September 27, 2021, five days after the discovery of the bodies.

In October 2021, before the authorities identified Lauren Phillips's remains, her mother filed a criminal complaint against Thornburg, presuming that her daughter, who was survived by two sons, was killed by Thornburg after befriending and staying with Thornburg in the inn itself. That same month, a Tarrant County judge ordered Thornburg to undergo a pre-trial psychiatric examination to determine if he suffered from a mental illness or intellectual disability.

In December 2021, three months after his arrest, 41-year-old Jason Thornburg was formally indicted by a grand jury in Texas for three counts of capital murder. Under Texas state law, the sentence for capital murder was either the death penalty or life imprisonment without the possibility of parole. At the time of Thornburg's indictment, the police successfully identified the two female victims.

In May 2022, prosecutors in Texas announced that they would seek the death penalty for Thornburg relating to the September 2021 Fort Worth murders.

=== Confession of other murders ===
During his detention for the Fort Worth murders, Thornburg, who assumed sole responsibility for the serial murders, additionally confessed to two more murders, one in Arizona in 2017 and another in May 2021. Like the Fort Worth serial murders in 2021, Thornburg committed these murders for sacrificial purposes.

The victim of the 2017 case was Thornburg's 37-year-old girlfriend, Tanya Begay, a Navajo woman from Gallup, New Mexico who went missing in March 2017 after she went on a trip with Thornburg to Arizona and never returned. It was alleged that sometime between March 3 and March 13, 2017, Thornburg killed Begay at an unknown location within the Navajo Nation in Arizona. For the murder of Begay, Thornburg was formally indicted by the Arizona state authorities for one count of first-degree murder, one count of assault with intent to commit murder, and one count of assault resulting in injury. The case remains open for investigation as of 2022.

The May 2021 case's victim was 61-year-old Mark Jewell, a former roommate of Thornburg who died in a house fire in Fort Worth, Texas. Thornburg had confessed to slitting Jewell's throat, uncapping a natural gas line, and lighting a candle, which led to the fire that supposedly killed Jewell (the cause of death was inconclusive). After this confession, Thornburg was separately indicted by another grand jury on February 18, 2022, for charges of murder and arson for the death of Jewell. Thornburg had been listed as a suspect for Jewell's murder, but, due to insufficient evidence, he was not arrested until after the 2022 murders.

== Death penalty trial ==
On November 7, 2024, Jason Thornburg stood trial before a Tarrant County jury for the 2021 Fort Worth murders, with Judge Douglas A. Allen presiding the trial. The defence counsel of Thornburg argued that Thornburg should be found not guilty by insanity due to his delusional beliefs perpetuated by religion and mental illnesses. The prosecution, on the other hand, argued that Thornburg was legally sane and cited his actions of disposing of the bodies and evading capture, calling him a manipulator capable of methodically covering his tracks and destroying evidence to evade justice.

On November 20, 2024, the jury found Thornburg guilty of all three counts of capital murder. The prosecution sought the death penalty for Thornburg, citing all the aggravating factors behind the murders and added that he would be a continued danger to society and other prisoners since Thornburg was caught making weapons while in prison. They also discredited the defence's claims of mental illnesses, describing it as Thornburg's excuses to deflect blame from himself. Assistant District Attorney Amy Allin called out Thornburg for his depraved indifference to life and described him as an "evil" psychopath.

The defence, on the other hand, submitted that Thornburg suffered partial fetal alcohol syndrome as a result of his mother's drinking and drug addiction while she was pregnant with Thornburg, as well as a moderate traumatic brain injury arising from a 2002 assault incident, and they stated that his mental responsibility had been affected by these factors. They added that Thornburg had been deluded into thinking that he rightly sacrificed the victims for religious reasons due to his mental conditions, which they claimed could still be addressed by rehabilitation and treatment. For this, they pushed for Thornburg to be sentenced to life in prison without parole rather than death.

On December 4, 2024, the jury returned with their verdict, unanimously sentencing Thornburg to death for the murders of Lueras, Phillips and Mathis. Thornburg has been incarcerated on death row at the Allan B. Polunsky Unit since the end of his trial.

Death sentences in Texas are automatically appealed to the Texas Court of Criminal Appeals, with inmates being entitled to a post-conviction appeal and a federal habeas appeal thereafter. The average length of time between being sent to death row and the imposition of the sentence is 11.05 years.

== See also ==
- Capital punishment in Texas
- List of death row inmates in the United States § Texas
- List of incidents of cannibalism
- List of serial killers active in the 2020s
- List of serial killers in the United States
