= Slamet Tohari =

Indonesian serial killer (born 1977)

- Born: Slamet Tohari c. 1977 (age 48–49); Indonesia
- Other name: Mbah Slamet
- Conviction: Murder (12 counts)
- Penalty: Death

Details
- Victims: 12+ (dozens confessed)
- Span of crimes: 2020–2023
- Country: Indonesia
- State: Central Java
- Date apprehended: 27 March 2023

Slamet Tohari (born c. 1977) is an Indonesian serial killer and scammer who fatally poisoned at least 12 people in Banjarnegara, Central Java, between 2020 and 2023.

== Murders ==
Slamet Tohari was jailed in 2019 on counterfeit money charges. After his release, he began to scam people by claiming that he had shamanic powers, which gave him the ability to multiply their money. He used counterfeit banknotes to support his claims. When confronted by victims who wanted their money back, he would kill them by giving them drinks laced with potassium cyanide. He would then spend the stolen money on cars, jewellery, and karaoke.

On 24 March 2023, a man named Prasetyo visited Tohari to confront him after sending his children a WhatsApp message instructing them to go to Tohari's home with police if he did not return. Three days after his disappearance, Prasetyo's family reported him as missing. After police were dispatched to Tohari's home, Prasetyo's body was discovered nearby in a freshly dug grave. Law enforcement later uncovered eleven other bodies buried at a location 20 square meters from Tohari's residence. The victims were aged between 25 and 50, and each was buried with the bottles of mineral water that had been used to poison them.

== Aftermath ==
Tohari was formally indicted on 26 September. He admitted to police that he had buried dozens of victims on his property. An accomplice who managed online advertising for his scams was also arrested; however, Tohari stated that he had acted alone in the murders.

On 12 January 2024, Tohari was sentenced to death. One judge described his actions as an "extraordinary crime" which shook the social order of the community.

== See also ==
- Ahmad Suradji
- List of serial killers active in the 2020s
- List of serial killers by country
