= Yuri Sparikhin =

Georgian-born Russian serial killer (born 1963)

- Юрий Спарихин
- Sparikhin before his final arrest
- Born: Yuri Valentinovich Sparikhin; 14 March 1963 (age 63); Batumi, Adjarian ASSR, Georgian SSR, USSR
- Convictions: Murder (4 counts); Rape
- Penalty: 3 years (1977); 10 years (1980); 6 years (1987); 4 years (1996); 20 years (2001); Life imprisonment (2021)

Details
- Victims: 4
- Span of crimes: 1980–2020
- Country: Soviet Union, Russia
- State: Krasnodar
- Date apprehended: 20 August 2020

Yuri Valentinovich Sparikhin (Russian: Юрий Валентинович Спарихин; born 14 March 1963) is a Georgian-born Russian serial killer, rapist, and kidnapper who committed four murders in the city of Novorossiysk, Krasnodar Krai, and its vicinity from 1980 to 2020. He received a life term for his final murder, and his case sparked controversy over the release of violent recidivists.

== Early life ==
Yuri Sparikhin was born on 14 March 1963, in Batumi, in the Adjarian ASSR, the younger of two brothers born to Valentin and Seraphima Sparikhin. In 1973, the Sparikhin family left the Georgian SSR and moved to Novorossiysk. While residing there, his parents were known to be law-abiding and respected citizens who cared about their children.

Despite this, Yuri began to exhibit signs of troubling behaviour at an early age, as he enjoyed torturing animals for his personal enjoyment. He and his older brother Boris studied at School No. 15, but as Yuri was not interested in studying, he earned bad grades and was chronically absent, instead spending his time on the streets among criminals. During his school years, Sparikhin was attacked by other students and earned a reputation as a bully, and after finishing the seventh grade, he was forced to drop out because of his constant problems with local authorities.

His relatives claimed that the reason for this behaviour was the alleged constant physical and sexual abuse Yuri suffered at the hands of his older brother, but this has never been substantiated, and Yuri himself would claim that no such thing occurred.

== Murders ==
=== First murder and imprisonment ===
In 1977, the 14-year-old Sparikhin was imprisoned for theft, and after serving out his sentence in full, he was released and returned to Novorossiysk. Only a few weeks after his release in 1980, he committed his first murder, killing a teenage neighbour known only by the name "Nadezhda". On the day of the murder, the 17-year-old Sparikhin learned that Nadezhda planned to attend a local ballroom in the evening. He proceeded to stalk her until she reached an isolated area, where Sparikhin attacked, raped, and savagely beat her, inflicting a severe head injury and disfiguring Nadezhda's face beyond recognition.

Later on, one of Sparikhin's female relatives was interviewed after his most recent arrest. She said the following:

What a shame... We thought he wouldn't come back after killing the girls. Such people should be shot. A beast... [...] We all knew her well. Nadia was, as they say, promiscuous. I saw her before she died. She was dressed up—in a Crimplene coat, platform shoes, and a can of moonshine—and told me she was going out. And then I recognized her from that coat. All that was left of her face was her chin—brains, blood over the walls. How could you do that in a room with a two-meter ceiling? And one shoe was covered in blood and stuck to the ceiling.

Subsequently, Sparikhin committed all subsequent murders similar to that of Nadezhda. As he was careless while committing the crime, he was arrested a few days later after an abundance of evidence linked him to the crime. However, as he was still a minor at the time, he avoided a likely death sentence and was instead sentenced to 10 years imprisonment, the harshest available penalty at the time.

While serving his criminal sentence, Sparikhin took part in robbing a prison stall in 1986, for which he was convicted and given an additional six years of imprisonment. He was released in 1996, and in the summer of that year, he committed a rape in Leninsky Park while in an intoxicated state. Subsequently, he attacked a police officer who tried to arrest him, inflicting a head injury on the officer. Sparikhin was brought to trial for these charges and received a combined sentence of four years imprisonment.

=== First release and murders ===
After serving his sentence, Sparikhin was released in early 2000 and returned to his mother's home in Novorossiysk. That same summer, he went on vacation to a recreation centre in Abrau-Dyurso, where his older brother worked as a security guard. A few days after arriving there, he raped and beat to death two underage girls.

After being arrested, Sparikhin claimed that he was innocent and instead blamed his brother Boris, who, like him, was an ex-convict who had been imprisoned for rape. Nevertheless, Yuri was convicted of this crime in 2001 and sentenced to 20 years of imprisonment, which he served in an undisclosed prison in the Saratov Oblast.

=== Second release and rape ===
Upon serving out his sentence, Sparikhin was once again released from prison on 19 June 2020, after which he returned to Novorossiysk. By that time, both his parents had died, and Boris had been murdered in a bar fight years prior, so Sparikhin moved in with a cousin and took a job as a pallet assembler at a local company in the city. On 14 August, having received an advance payment of 2,000 rubles, he went to the city centre and bought himself a new phone. Shortly afterwards, he committed a new crime.

While walking on Geroev Desantnikov Street, Sparikhin noticed a 34-year-old woman who was just about to enter her BMW. He walked up behind her and put a knife to her neck, demanding that the victim take him to the village of Myskhako. Once there, he threatened his victim and raped her, after which he forced her to return to Novorossiysk and drive around town. When it became night, he told her to stop the car in a deserted place, where Sparikhin raped her again.

In the 16th microdistrict of Novorossiysk, the victim deliberately violated traffic rules, after which a patrol car started following them. Upon realizing this, Sparikhin ordered her to stop the car and quickly fled without harming the victim further. However, he was quickly identified and arrested on 15 August.

=== Escape and final murder ===
Three days after his arrest, Sparikhin was brought to court in restraints, but after the session ended, he managed to break free and escape while officers attempted to bring him back to the detention centre. He immediately fled to Krasnodar, where, on the morning of 20 August, he was sitting on a bench when he noticed a car passing by, driven by a 40-year-old woman. He got inside the car and demanded to be taken to the Apsheronsky District. Once there, Sparikhin proceeded to rape and stab her to death.

Three days later, Sparikhin, who was driving the victim's stolen vehicle, failed to stop at an officer's request, and a chase ensued. During the chase, Sparikhin drove 10 kilometers but eventually lost control and crashed into a ditch, whereupon he was arrested by police. His subsequent trial lasted until March 2021, when the Krasnodar Krai Court found him guilty on all charges and handed him a life sentence.

== Imprisonment ==
After the trial, Sparikhin was transferred to SIZO-1 in Krasnodar, where he would await transfer to a special regime colony. In June 2021, while being escorted to the pre-trial detention center, he attacked the two guards with a piece of wire he had found in his cell; one of the guards received an injury on the nose, while the other suffered a medium-degree contusion on the right eye. After being disarmed, Sparikhin was charged with assault. In the subsequent interrogation, he admitted responsibility but refused to explain why he did it. This led investigators to speculate that he attacked the guards in order to delay his transfer, as the conditions in the colony were much harsher than the detention center.

On 27 May 2022, the 59-year-old Sparikhin was convicted of the assault charges and was given an additional nine years of imprisonment to be served concurrently with his life sentence.

== See also ==
- List of Russian serial killers
- List of serial killers active in the 2020s
- Levan Haroyan
