= Keith Gibson (serial killer) =

American serial killer (born 1982)

- Born: 1982 (age 43–44); Philadelphia, Pennsylvania, U.S.
- Other name: The Beast
- Convictions: Delaware: Manslaughter (2010); Illegal possession of weapons by a felon (2010); Murder x2 Attempted murder Robbery (2023); Pennsylvania: Awaiting trial
- Penalty: Delaware: 20 years imprisonment (2010); Life sentence without the possibility of parole x7 plus 296 years (2023); Pennsylvania: Awaiting trial

Details
- Victims: 3–7
- Span of crimes: 2008–2021
- Country: United States
- States: Delaware, Pennsylvania
- Date apprehended: June 8, 2021

Keith Gibson (born 1982) is an American serial killer who murdered between two and six people in Delaware and Pennsylvania from January to June 2021, less than a month after being paroled from serving time for a manslaughter conviction dating back to 2008.

Convicted for the crimes committed in Delaware in November 2023, he was sentenced to seven life sentences without parole plus 296 years and now awaits extradition to Pennsylvania to stand trial for the murders committed there.

== Early life ==
Very little is known about Gibson's early life. Born in 1982 in Philadelphia, he was the only son of 15-year-old Christine Gibson and an unknown father who abandoned them shortly after his birth, leaving the young boy to be raised by his mother and grandparents. The Gibsons lived in an impoverished urban area, where Christine worked as a social worker.

Christine would eventually succeed in this field, graduating from Springfield College with a bachelor's degree in social science in 2009 and later the Widener University in 2013. On the other hand, her son Keith had no interest in learning and dropped out of school early on, spending most of his time on the streets. In his teenage years, he began stealing, and between the mid-1990s and 2008, he was prosecuted nine times for various charges and was arrested more than 12 times for parole violations. His mother and relatives reported that he also started showing signs of mental instability and anger issues at this time, which frequently resulted in arguments.

== Murders ==
=== Murder of Stanley Jones ===
In the early morning hours of July 6, 2008, while committing another robbery in Edgemoor, Delaware, the 26-year-old Gibson, along with accomplices James Hinson and Kelly Gibbs, shot and killed 36-year-old Stanley Savon Jones. After interviewing witnesses and getting results from an examination of the bullet casings, Gibson was arrested at his mother's home in September of that year and charged with Jones' murder.

=== Parole ===
In 2010, he was convicted of the murder charge and unlawful possession of a weapon, for which he was given a 20-year sentence. After serving more than 12 years in prison, he was paroled in June 2020 to a community corrections facility. Not long after, a complaint was filed against him for fighting with other offenders, after which he was returned to prison. He remained there until December 20, when he was released yet again with 18 months probation.

His parole conditions were very strict, as he was prohibited from leaving the state and from being outdoors at late hours. Upon release, he was required to meet with his parole officer on a weekly basis and provide references to his residence and workplace.

=== Violation of parole and crime spree ===
==== Initial murders ====
In early January 2021, Gibson left Delaware and returned to Philadelphia, thereby violating the conditions of his parole. In mid-January, he appeared at his mother's home, where the pair began to argue constantly due to Keith's bouts of aggression.

On January 28, Gibson entered the Al Madinah Traders store in the Germantown neighborhood, whereupon he shot and killed two customers: 50-year-old Eric Flores and 42-year-old Roy Caban. The former was shot once in the head, while the latter was shot twice in the face, with their bodies being discovered by a passer-by. In the early hours of February 8, he went to his mother Christine's workplace at United Peers – RHD in East Falls, where she worked as a supervisor, before shooting her once in the head and killing her on the spot. Her body was later discovered by a coworker.

On the following day, while police officers were investigating his mother's murder, Keith was interviewed and soon revealed to be violating his parole conditions. When they learned that he was absconding, he was extradited to Delaware to face prosecution. At this time, he was considered the prime suspect in Christine's murder, as surveillance footage showed him to be inside the building when she was killed, with suspicions of relatives and friends being further aroused by the fact that Christine claimed that if anything were to happen to her, it was likely that Keith was solely responsible.

At an April 2021 court hearing, probation officers recommended to Justice Vivian L. Medinilla that he returned to prison to serve the remaining 6.5 years of his 2008 sentence, but Gibson's attorney objected, providing the court with certificates that showed that Gibson had found a fiancée who had provided him with housing and employment in Philadelphia. Due to this, he requested that his client be allowed to move there, noting that the parole officers there would monitor him strictly. Two weeks later, on April 27, Medinilla sentenced Gibson to 31 days imprisonment for the parole violations. After completing his sentence, he was allowed to leave Delaware and moved to Philadelphia, where he continued to be monitored by parole authorities.

==== Escalation ====
On May 15, Gibson entered a Metro by T-Mobile store in Elsmere, Delaware, whereupon he dragged 28-year-old clerk Leslie Liceth Ruiz-Basilio to the back of the store and shot her in the head. After committing the murder, he stole some money and some cellphones before fleeing the scene in her SUV. The entire ordeal was captured on CCTV, but the killer could not be immediately identified due to the fact he was wearing a mask. Gibson soon left Delaware and returned to Philadelphia, where for the following weeks he lived on the streets.

On June 5, he went to the Fairhill neighborhood, where he intended to rob a Dunkin' Donuts store. At around 5 AM, Gibson waited for 41-year-old Christine Lugo to open up the store - when she did, he pushed her inside, forced her to give $300 at gunpoint and then shot her in the head with a .357 revolver. This was also caught on CCTV, but this time, Gibson made no effort to conceal his identity. After this murder, representatives from the Pennsylvania State Police Department started working closely with their colleagues in Delaware, as a review of the videotapes led them to believe that the killings were committed by a single offender.

In the meantime, Gibson committed his final crimes on the following day, shooting and killing 42-year-old drug dealer Ronald Wright in Wilmington, Delaware during a street robbery. Over the next two days, he robbed three more people in Wilmington, but all of them survived their encounter.

== Arrest ==
On June 8, 2021, Gibson was arrested by police officers in Wilmington shortly after robbing a local Rite Aid at gunpoint. During the robbery, the clerk managed to slip in a GPS among the bank notes, which allowed authorities to locate Gibson. At the time of his arrest, he was armed with a revolver and was wearing body armor, but offered no resistance.

Upon frisking him, officers discovered drugs, ammo, gloves, a mask, a gun and stolen money. Gibson himself later showed the officers a cache in which he had hidden the revolver used in the murders. Due to the abundance of evidence, he was indicted on a total of 41 felonies, including two murders, attempted murder, assault and robbery.

== Trials ==
=== Delaware ===
In July 2021, a number of top law enforcement officials from both states met to plan their strategy for prosecuting Gibson. Ultimately, it was decided that he would first stand trial in Delaware for the murders of Ruiz-Basilio and Wright, after which he would be extradited to Pennsylvania to face charges there.

The Delaware trial began in New Castle County in October 2023. The prosecution's case against Gibson relied heavily on the surveillance footage showing the robberies and murders, as well as the forensic evidence which linked the revolver to the crime scenes. Clothes and several other pieces of evidence, including stolen items that were later found in Gibson's home, also indicated his guilt.

His cohabitant at the time later appeared at a witness for the prosecution, positively identifying Gibson as the man in the footage. His attorney did not argue that his client was innocent, but instead focused on inconsistencies in the prosecution's case, cross-examining witnesses and pointing out that there was no DNA or fingerprints tying Gibson to any of the crime scenes. To refute this, prosecutors pointed out that Ruiz-Basilio's SUV, which had been stolen by her killer, was later found abandoned near Gibson's home in Philadelphia.

Another witness for the prosecution was one of the men who was attacked hours after Wright's murder. The man, Belal Almansoori, who suffered a gunshot wound to the head during the robbery and only survived by pretending to be dead, was absolutely certain that Gibson was his assailant. In addition to this, Wright's fingerprints were found on the bag of drugs that was found to be in Gibson's possession at the time of his arrest.

On November 14, 2023, after deliberating for six hours, the jury found Gibson guilty on all charges. In March 2024 Delaware Superior Court Judge Ferris Wharton sentenced Gibson to seven life sentences without possibility of parole for two murders plus 296 years for robbery, attempted murder and other charges.

=== Pennsylvania ===
After his Delaware trial concluded, Gibson is now awaiting extradition to Philadelphia, where he is supposed to stand trial for the remaining four murders sometime in 2024.

On September 24, 2024, Gibson was charged with contempt of court after repeatedly interrupting testimony during a preliminary hearing for his upcoming trial in Philadelphia. He was removed from the courtroom after interrupting the speaker at least ten times.

== See also ==
- List of serial killers active in the 2020s
- List of serial killers in the United States
