= Heather Pressdee =

American serial killer (born 1982)

- Pressdee in 2023
- Born: August 28, 1982 (age 44)
- Status: Incarcerated
- Convictions: First degree murder (3 counts); Attempted murder (19 counts)
- Penalty: 3 consecutive life sentences without the possibility of parole, plus 380 to 760 years

Details
- Victims: 3 confirmed; 17 linked
- Span of crimes: 2022–2023
- Country: United States
- State: Pennsylvania
- Date apprehended: May 25, 2023

Heather Irene Pressdee (born August 28, 1982) is a former American Registered Nurse (RN), former Licensed Veterinary Technician (LVT/CVT), and convicted serial killer. She is currently serving consecutive sentences of life imprisonment after being convicted of murdering three patients by lethal injection. Investigators have linked her to a total of 17 deaths in Western Pennsylvania.

== Early life ==
The daughter of Michael and Bonita Pressdee, she was born on August 28, 1982, and is the oldest of two children. From 2003 to 2004, she attended the Community College of Allegheny County but did not graduate. She later became a registered veterinary technician before returning to obtain a nursing degree.

== Crimes ==
Pressdee intentionally administered lethal doses of insulin to patients across five nursing homes in Pennsylvania. The first two victims she was charged with murdering were James Bartoe, 55, and Joseph Campbell, 83. They died on December 4 and 25, 2022, respectively. Her third victim was Nicholas Cymbol, 43, who died on May 1, 2023.

Pressdee told her attorney that she believed she was ending the suffering of her victims.

== Arrest and trial ==
Pressdee was arrested on May 25, 2023. She was charged with three counts of murder and 19 counts of attempted murder. Authorities also linked her to the deaths of 17 patients. To avoid the death penalty, Pressdee pleaded guilty to all charges. She ultimately pleaded guilty to the murders of James Bartoe, 55; Gerald Shrum, 90; and Nicholas Cymbol, 43. On May 2, 2024, she was sentenced to three consecutive life terms, along with 380 to 760 additional years. She is incarcerated at the State Correctional Institution in Muncy, Pennsylvania.

== See also ==
- List of serial killers in the United States
- List of serial killers active in the 2020s
