= Alexander Kiselev (serial killer) =

Russian serial killer (born 1978)

- Born: Alexander Valeryevich Kiselev; 1978 (age 47–48); Perm, Perm Oblast, RSFSR (present-day Perm Krai, Russia)
- Other names: "The Tie Maniac" "Kudin"
- Conviction: Murder x3
- Penalty: 22 years imprisonment, reduced to 20 years (2004); 13.5 years imprisonment (2023)

Details
- Victims: 3
- Span of crimes: 2003–2022
- Country: Russia
- State: Perm
- Date apprehended: December 2003 (first arrest); 20 November 2022 (second arrest)

Alexander Vasilyevich Kiselev (Russian: Александр Валерьевич Киселёв; born 1978), known as The Tie Maniac (Russian: Галстучный маньяк), is a Russian serial killer who murdered a woman in Chusovoy, Perm Krai, in 2022, shortly after being released for two similar murders he committed in 2003. Kiselev committed these crimes to satisfy an unusual fetish for strangling women with a tie that matched the color of their shoes.

For the latter crimes, Kiselev was convicted and sentenced to 13.5 years imprisonment.

== Early life ==
Alexander Kiselev was born in 1978 in Perm, Perm Oblast, the only son of two employees working for the FSIN. Despite the lack of any negative behavior present in the family, Kiselev started to show signs of a mental illness during his teenage years and suddenly withdrew from interacting with his peers, leading to arguments with his father.

After completing the ninth grade of school, Kiselev stopped studying and never searched for a job, living off of his mother. In the late 1990s, he moved into an old apartment building on the outskirts of the city on 64 Penzenskaya Street. In the early 2000s, Kiselev became interested in manufacturing false claims about himself to mislead acquaintances – this most often included him introducing himself by the nickname "Kudin" (named after a local gangster prevalent in the 1990s) and pretending to have connections to the criminal underworld. In reality, Kiselev had no such connections and was not known to be involved in any criminal activity prior to the murders.

== Murders ==
=== 2003 crimes ===
On 29 and 30 October, 2003, Kiselev strangled two young female acquaintances in his apartment. The victims were 18-year-old Lilia Tarutina and 20-year-old Olesya Danutsa, both being university students whom he befriended the previous month when he met them at the Perm II railway station. At the time, the pair were returning to university after spending their summer vacation at their parents' homes in Kogalym, Khanty-Mansi Autonomous Okrug. After meeting up with them, Kiselev offered to carry their bags to their apartment building on Khimgradskaya Street, where the pair lived with their grandmothers. Kiselev befriended the older women and often spent time with Tarutina and Danutsa, but their relationship was strictly platonic.

In late October, Kiselev confessed his love to Danutsa and offered to have sex with her, but she refused, revealing that she had a fiancé back in Kogalym. On the afternoon of 29 October, Kiselev met up with Tarutina and went on a walk with her, after which he invited her to his apartment to drink coffee and play cards. Once the game ended, Kiselev grabbed a tie and strangled her.

That same evening, he bought a bouquet of roses and went to Danutsa's house. She was ill and needed to go to the local pharmacy, allowing Alexander to accompany her, returning home afterwards. On the following day, Kiselev went again and persuaded Danutsa to go on a walk with him, during which he invited her to come to his apartment for a cup of coffee. Mere minutes after she entered, he strangled her with the same tie that he killed Tarutina.

In order to hide the bodies, Kiselev dug up a shallow grave near his house and buried both of them in there. He left the two ties around the necks, as he liked the fact that they matched the victims' shoes. In the meantime, both women's parents alerted the police about their disappearances, after which officers decided to question Kiselev as one of the last people to see them alive. Once he learned of this, he went on the run. Kiselev was arrested in early December in Perm while going on a date with another female friend named Olga. The young woman had been informed by investigators about Kiselev's arrest warrant, and immediately called police once he made contact with her. At the time of his detention, he was carrying a razor and man's tie in his pocket, but refused to explain what they were for. According to investigators, this indicated that he likely intended to kill Olga.

==== Investigation, trial and imprisonment ====
During the initial interrogations, Kiselev admitted responsibility, claiming that he had had sex with both of them prior to the murders. Whilst he claimed that the acts were consensual, investigators suspected that both were raped, but were unable to conclusively prove it. A definitive motive was never established, as Kiselev himself claimed that he had no reason to kill them, instead claiming that he had some sort of uncontrollable urge to murder. On 11 December, he was taken under escort to the burial site, where he pointed out the shallow grave to the investigators. The grave was dug up, leading to the recovery of the bodies.

On 16 June 2004, Kiselev was found guilty on all counts and sentenced to 22 years imprisonment. He filed an appeal against the sentence at the Court of Appeals, which accepted it on the grounds that the prosecutors had made a number of procedural errors during the investigation. As a result, his sentence was reduced by two years.

During his time in prison, Kiselev was regarded positively by the prison administration and was even granted several recommendations for early release. On this basis, he filed a petition for parole in November 2018, but this was denied.

In 2020, after having served 17 years of his sentence, Kiselev filed a second petition to replace his remaining sentence with forced labor. This was granted, and he was then transferred to a penal colony near the town of Gornozavodsk.

=== 2022 murder ===
Once he settled into the penal colony, like most convicts, Kiselev found employment at a woodworking enterprise in Gornozavodsk. He was soon promoted to foreman, and met a 43-year-old woman named Natalia, a mother-of-three who lived in nearby Chusovoy. Since Natalia was his subordinate, the pair spent plenty of time together, leading to Kiselev paying increased attention to her. In order to hide his violent past, he claimed that he had been convicted of hooliganism and had a family, but his wife supposedly left him and their child shortly after giving birth.

After receiving parole in late August 2022, Kiselev left the colony and rented an apartment in Chusovoy. Later that fall, he began an intimate relationship with Natalia, despite the fact that she had recently married her common-law husband and the father of her children with whom she had been living for 13 years. On 13 November, she went to church with her children and her mother, after which she went on a date with Kiselev. That same evening, she was strangled to death.

Her body, naked from the waist down, was found on the following day on the floor of an apartment on 50 Let VLKSM Street in Chusovoy. Once police started looking into her activities for the day of her death, they learned that she had requested a three-month-long mental health detention order at the church for somebody named Alexander Kiselev. Investigators soon learned that this mysterious man lived in a nearby rented apartment, but once they went there, they were unable to find him.

==== Fugitive, arrest, and confession ====
Sometime after the murder, Kiselev had packed up his things and headed towards his parents' home in Perm. For the next few days, he behaved cautiously, sleeping in rented apartments and changing the SIM card of his phone each day. On 20 November, a landlady living in Perm's Motovilikhinsky City District on Boulevard Gagarin reported that one of her tenants was Alexander Kiselev. That same evening, she went to the apartment and demanded to be let in, but Kiselev refused. Once she threatened to kick him out if he did not renew his rent, Kiselev opened the door, after which he was detained by police officers who were standing by.

At the time of his arrest, Kiselev was pale and was losing consciousness, a result of a suicide attempt. Once he was stable enough to be interrogated, Kiselev fully admitted his guilt, claiming that he had strangled Natalia to death during an argument. He claimed that he had attempted to persuade her to divorce her husband and marry him, but she refused, whereupon he became enraged and started strangling and punching her. He then threw her to the ground, sat on top of her and continued strangling her with an assortment of objects including his trouser belt, plastic garbage bags, a belt from his bag and a cable antenna. The whole process lasted for an extended amount of time before the victim finally succumbed. An autopsy indicated that Natalia and Kiselev had had sexual intercourse shortly prior to her death, with Kiselev claiming that it was consensual, while Natalia's mother insisted that her daughter had been raped.

== Trial and imprisonment ==
Shortly after his arrest, Kiselev was charged with murder without aggravating circumstances, for which he faced a possible punishment ranging from 6 to 15 years imprisonment. He was found guilty on 29 September 2023 and subsequently sentenced to 13 years and 6 months imprisonment. He avoided a life sentence due to the fact the court took into account several mitigating factors, including his active cooperation and willing confession to the crime.

Outraged by the perceived leniency of the sentence, Natalia's relatives filed an appeal to the Perm Krai Court for a longer one, but the court rejected the appeal on 26 October of that year. The mother expressed her anger following the court hearing, telling reporters that she had constant dreams about her daughter and that she would appeal to central television to raise awareness about the case in hopes of gathering enough support and find ways to increase the length of Kiselev's sentence.

== See also ==
- List of Russian serial killers
- List of serial killers active in the 2020s
