= Kulthum Akbari =

Iranian serial killer (born 1967)

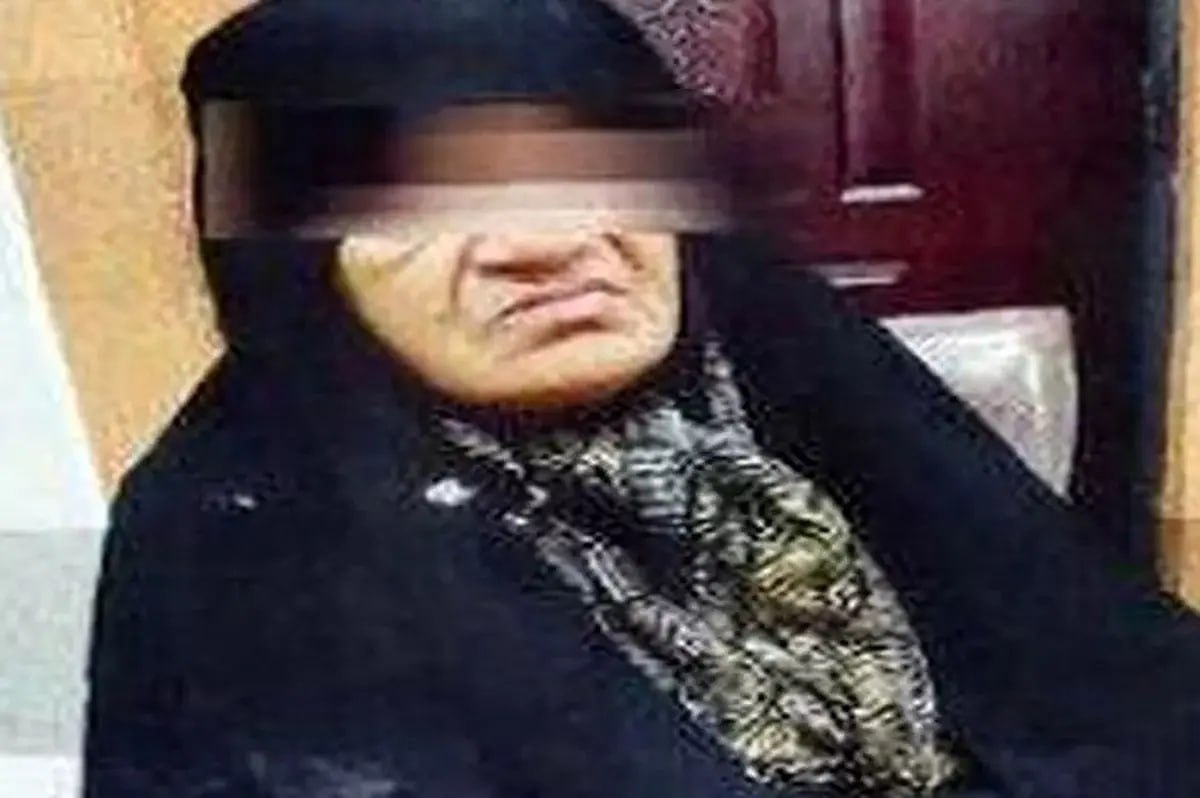
- Born: 1967 (age 58–59); Malekabad-e Bala, Iran
- Conviction: Murder

Details
- Span of crimes: 2001–2023
- Country: Iran
- Date apprehended: September 2023

Kulthum Akbari (Note: some English-language sources name her as Kolsum Akbari) (Persian: کلثوم اکبری; born 1967) is an Iranian serial killer. After she was arrested in 2023 on suspicion of being involved in the death of her 82-year-old husband, she confessed to killing 10 other people in 20 years. When she was arrested, she introduced herself to the camera and she resided in Sari.

However, investigations show that Akbari had 18 concubine husbands and 19 official marriages in these years, all of whom died, and the number of her victims is likely to be more than 11. In total, it has been suggested that she killed more than 20 men. Akbari herself gave conflicting accounts of how many people she killed, saying she could not remember the precise number. She is thought to be the second female Iranian serial killer after Mahin Qadiri.

In September 2025, Akbari was found guilty of 11 counts of murder. She received ten death sentences, as requested by the families of her victims. The eleventh family agreed to forgo the death penalty in return for blood money. Akbari also received an additional ten-year prison sentence for attempted murder.

== Modus operandi ==
Akbari used to talk about her life and that she wants to marry an elderly man who lives alone. In this way, she met people who were looking for a companion for their elderly and lonely father. After making sure that the intended subject has a lot of wealth, Kulthum would marry him on the condition of receiving a dowry in the form of cash or property, and in less than 3 months, she would kill the person by means of drugs and suffocation. She would dissolve sugar or blood pressure pills in various drinks and give them to the victim. At first, when the victim's condition worsened, Akbari took him to the hospital and apparently saved him. But in the later stages, by increasing the dose of the drug, she made them unconscious and killed them, and because they had a previous history, no one suspected how they died.

Akbari committed her murders in the cities of Sari, Neka, Mahmudabad, Babol and Qaem Shahr. She used to choose her victims from different cities so as not to leave a trace of herself. One of her victims, Masih Nemati, survived after drinking poisoned syrup and threw her out of his house, but did not file a police report. His son later described the incident to the son of Akbari's final victim, 82-year-old Gholamreza Babaei, leading to Akbari's arrest when the two men recognized her and alerted authorities.
