= Tavakal Khamidov =

Uzbekistani serial killer (born 1986)

- Born: Tavakal Urinovich Khamidov; 13 September 1986 (age 40); Pulati, Bukhara Region, Uzbek SSR
- Other name: "The Holosiiv Maniac"
- Convictions: Murder x11 Attempted murder
- Penalty: Life imprisonment

Details
- Victims: 11–17
- Span of crimes: 2018 – 2024 (confirmed)
- Country: Ukraine, possibly Russia
- States: Kharkiv, Kyiv possibly Moscow
- Date apprehended: 3 January 2024

Tavakal Urinovich Khamidov (Russian: Тавакал Уринович Хамидов; born 13 September 1986), known as The Holosiiv Maniac (Russian: Голосеевский маньяк), is an Uzbekistani serial killer and necrophile who murdered at least 11 people in Kharkiv and Kyiv Oblasts between 2018 and 2024. Khamidov himself has claimed responsibility for at least six additional murders, including one in Russia, but these have not been confirmed.

Khamidov was charged and successfully convicted of his confirmed crimes in Ukraine, which led to him being sentenced to life imprisonment.

== Early life ==
Little is known about Khamidov's early life. Born on 13 September 1986 in the village of Pulati, Bukhara Region, Uzbek SSR, he grew up in a large, impoverished family. According to him, his father was an alcoholic and did not protect him from his older brothers and other relatives, whom Khamidov claimed bullied him. He additionally claimed that he was sexually abused by an older man from his native village, but this was never corroborated.

Khamidov often skipped school due to a lack of interest in studying and poor grades, instead preferring to be in the company of various petty criminals on the streets – it is not known if he committed any crimes during this period, as he was never arrested and was not known to be aggressive. In 2005, Khamidov and several friends moved to Russia for work, where they resided in the Moscow Oblast for approximately five years. In 2009 and twice in 2010, he was arrested by police officers for not having a valid work permit.

=== Deportation and move to Ukraine ===
In April 2010, Khamidov was fined 2,000 rubles for immigration offenses and ordered to be deported from the country, but for reasons unknown, this never occurred – instead, he simply left Moscow and moved in with some friends in Tula, Tula Oblast. Supposedly, he lost his passport during the move, as a result of which he was unable to find a job or register at his place of residence.

In mid-2010, Khamidov was arrested by local authorities after he was positively identified in the Migrant database for not reporting the loss of his passport. In May 2011, he was fined an additional 2,000 rubles and temporarily held in a detention center before he was finally deported back to Uzbekistan.

After living in his homeland for a while, Khamidov left Uzbekistan again and moved illegally to Ukraine. For the next several years, he traveled across the country as a vagrant and made a living via low-skilled labor, odd jobs, and theft. He preferred to be in the company of other homeless people and petty criminals, most of whom were alcoholics like himself.

In 2020, Khamidov was arrested in the Chernihiv Oblast for immigration violations, for which he was eventually fined and deported. He returned to the country only a couple of months later, but was arrested yet again in the following year in Kyiv for stealing a car. Eleven months later, in 2022, he was found guilty on all counts, but was given a suspended sentence with five years of probation, allowing Khamidov to remain free.

== Murders ==
=== Modus operandi ===
Unbeknownst to the authorities at the time, between 2018 and 2024, Khamidov committed at least 11 murders against his drinking buddies in Ukraine, almost always following a certain modus operandi. He would kill them in various manners after getting into arguments or sometimes completely unprovoked, after which he would sexually abuse the bodies of the female victims. In particular, Khamidov liked to partially undress them and kiss their genitalia. After each murder, he would rob the murder victim, with his most valuable haul being a phone worth 1,600 hryvnia and 5,000 hryvnia in cash.

The victims' bodies were often left in vacant lots or other abandoned areas, and most often were found days later, when decomposition made it difficult to determine what the cause of death was. The ages of the victims ranged from 35 to 81, and were of varying nationalities. According to the official tally count, Khamidov killed eight Ukrainians; one Uzbekistani; one Latvian, and one Georgian.

=== Killings ===
Khamidov's first confirmed murder was committed in February 2018, in Kharkiv. At that time, he was working as a loader at a market and, together with another countryman, was renting space in a dacha. Khamidov claimed that shortly before the murder, his cohabitant confessed that in order to save himself from dire financial straits, he had resorted to prostituting himself, leading to an argument between them. Khamidov then waited for the man to fall asleep, whereupon he struck him 30 times on the head and body with an axe. He then burned the murder weapon, the victim's phones and his identification in the oven, after which he packed up his belongings and left for Kyiv. Authorities suspected that the true motive for this murder was that Khamidov offered to have sex with the man after learning that he was a prostitute, but was rejected, a hypothesis which Khamidov himself disputed.

On 8 August 2019, Khamidov and a Latvian acquaintance were hanging around School No. 85 in Kyiv's Holosiivskyi District, near the Demiivska metro station, when they got into some kind of argument. Khamidov proceeded to brutally beat up the man, hitting him using his hands, feet, and a stone on the head and vital parts of the body, killing him in the process. He then covered the body with a blanket and fled the area.

On 5 September, Khamidov started stalking a man who was visiting Kyiv from Babychi, Cherkasy Oblast. After following him for some time and making sure there were no potential witnesses, Khamidov attacked him in an area of the Dniprovskyi District and beat him to death with a stone.

In January 2020, Khamidov befriended three homeless men, a father and two sons, who, like him, were homeless petty criminals who lived via odd jobs and collecting bottles. While drinking alcohol together in the basement of a house in the Obolonskyi District, a conflict broke out between them. While intoxicated, Khamidov waited until all three of them fell asleep, after which he strangled them to death one by one with a belt. He then covered up the bodies with rubbish and left.

In 2021, Khamidov was skulking around the courtyard of an apartment building in the Sviatoshynskyi District when he noticed a drunken man stumbling around. Deciding that he wanted to rob the man, Khamidov picked up a piece of asphalt and hit him several times on the head. The victim somehow survived the ordeal, but suffered debilitating injuries from the assault.

In June 2023, Khamidov was walking around the Dorohozhychi metro station when he noticed a drunk woman sitting underneath a tree. According to his own claims, the woman showed interest in him and wanted to hang out – he accepted her offer, and after buying some food and alcohol at a supermarket, they visited Babi Yar to have a picnic. He claimed that after they both got drunk, he and the woman had sex before he strangled her to death and had sex with her body. Khamidov then got up, adjusted the body by straighthening out its arms, and left unnoticed. When asked what prompted him to kill her, he was unable to give a motive.

A month later, in early July, Khamidov met a Georgian national near the Pochaina metro station. For unknown reasons, he decided that he wanted to kill his new acquaintance, luring under an overpass near the WOG filling station on the pretext that they were going to drink together. He instead strangled the man to death with a sheet, then tied it up into a noose and hung the man from a metal beam in an attempted to stage a suicide.

A few days later, in the same area, Khamidov met a woman at a bus stop who asked him if he knew where the trolleybuses stop in Troieshchyna. He offered to show her the quickest route, instead luring her to a vacant lot near an unfinished building, where he strangled the woman to death. He then stole her money and several small items, before he dragged the body inside one of the rooms of the building. Khamidov then laid it out on the floor, turned it to face him, tried to undress it and have sex with it, but was unable to sustain an erection. He then waited until evening, when he took a sheet and blanket out of his backpack, laid the corpse next to him, and slept with it until the early morning before leaving.

Near the end of July, Khamidov befriended an elderly man he met at a supermarket in Borshchahivka. Deciding that he wanted to kill him as well, he lured the man to an abandoned building in the area where he strangled him to death with some denim fabric. He then covered up the body with rubbish, and left.

Khamidov's last known murder occurred on 1 January 2024. According to him, on that day, he was drunk and decided to go on a walk when he noticed a flower shop. He then spotted a 54-year-old saleswoman, originally from the city of Drohobych, Lviv Oblast, who was tending to the store. Wanting to kill her, he threw a stone at the window and hid, waiting for her to come out. When the woman did, he approached her and said that some two drug addicts he had been chasing after broke the window, offering to help her pick up the glass. The woman invited him inside, after which Khamidov claimed that he offered her a drink and suggested that they meet up again later, but she politely refused him. Initially, he left the store, but returned soon afterwards and proceeded to stab the woman 30 times in the ribs, abdomen, neck, and head. After the murder, he removed her pants and underwear, then kissed her genitals. Once he was satisfied, Khamidov stole the victim's gold jewelry, phone charger, and money from the cash register, covered the victim in yellow roses, and then fled. Her body was discovered on the following day at 8 AM.

== Arrest and confessions ==
Mere hours after the last murder, Khamidov was arrested without incident on a street in the Holosiivskyi District after several witnesses and surveillance footage identified him as the killer. During his first interrogation, he calmly and monotonously confessed in detail not only to the murder of the saleswoman, but also to the remaining ten murders. For the next several months, he actively assisted investigators in recreating the crime scenes, but around the spring of that year, he started to feign insanity. While he still admitted guilt, he now claimed that he did because some disembodied voices ordered him to do so.

Notably, Khamidov confessed to a total of 17 murders during interrogations, which he claimed began with the murder of another Uzbek in the late 2000s, while he was still living in Moscow. Due to the ongoing Russo-Ukrainian war at the time, investigators decided not to look into the Russian case, and since they were unable to verify the remaining five cases that supposedly occurred in their own country, they were not included in his indictment.

== Trial and imprisonment ==
In late 2024, Khamidov was ordered to undergo a forensic psychiatric examination for two months to determine whether he was capable of standing trial. He was ruled to be sane, and his case was referred to the Kyiv courts in November 2024.

The trial began in the spring of 2025. Throughout the proceedings, Khamidov openly admitted responsibility, but showed no remorse for his actions. His lawyer attempted to request leniency for his client, mostly relying on his active cooperation with investigators, but the court dismissed this, stating that his actions were too severe for this to be considered a mitigating factor. As a result, Khamidov was convicted of the eleven murders and attempted murder, for which he was sentenced to life imprisonment. He expressed no visible emotion upon the announcement of the verdict.

After Khamidov's conviction, Maxim Tsuckiridze, head of the Main Investigation Department of the National Police of Ukraine, praised the actions of law enforcement agencies in exposing the serial killer. In his statement, he noted that this case was an example of how, even in wartime, justice does not lose its power thanks to the coordinated efforts and professional work of police officers.

== See also ==
- List of serial killers by country
- List of serial killers active in the 2020s
