= Alexei Varakin =

Uzbekistani serial killer (born 1986)

- Born: Alexei Andreyevich Varakin; 1986 (age 39–40); Tashkent, Uzbek SSR
- Other names: "The Prostitute Killer" "The Escort Killer"
- Conviction: N/A
- Penalty: Involuntary commitment

Details
- Victims: 4
- Span of crimes: 2010–2023
- Country: Russia
- States: Saint Petersburg, Moscow
- Date apprehended: 2 April 2010 (first arrest); 24 December 2023 (second arrest)

Alexei Andreyevich Varakin (Russian: Алексей Андреевич Варакин; born 1986), known as The Prostitute Killer (Russian: Убийца проституток), is an Uzbekistani serial killer. Originally interned at a psychiatric clinic for the murder of two prostitutes in Saint Petersburg in 2010, he was released after 11 years – two years later, he committed two similar murders in Moscow. He was again judged to be insane on the moment of the murders, and interned at another psychiatric facility.

Varakin's crimes caused a public outcry and discussion about the treatment of violent offenders with mental issues.

== Early life ==
Very little is known about Varakin's early life. Born in 1986 in Tashkent, in the Uzbek SSR, he began to show signs of a mental illness early on in his childhood. In the mid-1990s, he underwent a psychiatric examination and was diagnosed with schizophrenia, for which he was treated in various clinics around Tashkent on four separate occasions.

At the end of 2009, Varakin left Uzbekistan and illegally moved to Saint Petersburg, Russia, where his grandparents lived.

== Murders ==
=== Saint Petersburg ===
On 1 April 2010, the 23-year-old Varakin went to an escort agency located on Zakharievskaya Street in Saint Petersburg, where he hired two women, 18 and 42, respectively. While they were undressing in an adjacent room, Varakin searched their clothes and purses for valuables. After the women noticed that some of their personal items were missing, Varakin attacked them, stabbing both multiple times. After killing the women, he stole about 100,000 rubles in cash, a laptop, cell phones and a bag of cosmetics.

As he was reckless while committing the crimes, Varakin was arrested on the following day due to the high amount of incriminating evidence and multiple witnesses placing him at the crime scene. Following his arrest, he was transferred to the Serbsky Center to undergo a forensic psychiatric exam. After spending several months testing Varakin, the specialists concluded that he suffered from a particularly maliable form of schizophrenia which rendered him incapable of discerning right from wrong. On this basis, in 2011, the court panel ruled that Varakin was declared insane and ordered to undergo compulsory treatment in a psychiatric clinic with intensive supervision.

=== Treatment and release ===
In the mid-2010s, Varakin's mother filed a petition requesting that her son be transferred to a similar institution in Uzbekistan. Since this did not contradict normative legal acts in the criminal procedure legislation, the petition was granted and Varakin was extradited to Uzbekistan. For the next couple of years, he was examined by a special medical commission every six months.

In 2021, the commission ruled that Varakin's mental health had markedly improved, after which it was decided that he should be moved to outpatient treatment. The Tashkent City Court, having studied the documents provided by the hospital, decided to discharge Varakin, after which he was released.

For some time, Varakin lived in Tashkent with his mother, where he registered with a psychiatrist and continued to take his prescribed medication regularly. After the death of a relative, he inherited his property, selling it in 2023 for a large sum of money. In October 2023, in violation of the supervision order, Varakin left Uzbekistan and again traveled to Russia. For the next two months, he resided for a few days in Samara and Ivanovo, before moving to Moscow in December 2023.

=== Moscow ===
On 22 December 2023, Varakin met 40-year-old prostitute Olga Vorobyova through the Internet and invited her to his room at the "Vechny Zov" hotel, located near the Partizanskaya metro station. In the room, they drank alcohol for some time before Varakin demanded that Vorobyova have sex with him. She refused, claiming that she was too drunk – enraged at her refusal, Varakin grabbed a knife and stabbed her to death, before ultimately beheading her. He managed to smuggle her corpse out of the hotel and dumped it in the Izmailovo Park Estate, where it was discovered the next day.

Two days later, Varakin met 25-year-old Vladislava "Vlada" Skitskaya, a native of Krasnodar who prostituted herself on dating websites. The woman invited him to her apartment, located in an elite housing complex near the Moscow City business district. In there, Varakin was unable to perform sexual intercourse due to his erectile dysfunction, leading to the pair having a quarrel. In the midst of the argument, Varakin pulled out a knife and stabbed Skitskaya several times – before she succumbed to her injuries, the mortally wounded woman managed to make a video call on her cell phone to one of her friends, who, having seen Vlada and Varakin on the video link, called the police.

A few minutes later, law enforcement arrived at the apartment complex and arrested Varakin, who was visibly injured. It is unclear how exactly he sustained these injuries, with some sources claiming that he cut his veins in a suicide attempt, while others claim that he was stabbed during the struggle with Skitskaya. Varakin was taken to a nearby hospital, where he received medical care. In the subsequent interrogation, he immediately cooperated with investigators and confessed to the two murders, giving detailed testimony on each of the two crimes.

On 25 December, Varakin was charged with the two murders and remanded in custody by the Presnensky District Court until 24 February 2024. At the court hearing, Varakin shouted at the judge and prosecutors, kept his back to the court and attempted to hide his face under a hood. He agreed to be remanded in custody, but demanded that he be placed in solitary confinement while he was lodged in the pre-trial detention center.

== Trial and second internment ==
On 28 January 2025, Varakin's trial opened in the Moscow City Court. In it, he pleaded guilty to one of the murders, but did not do so for the second one, claiming that it was "necessary" to kill her. He also stated that he was not ready to testify at that stage and that he needed to consult with his lawyer.

Throughout the initial proceedings, Varakin did not hide his face from reporters and allowed himself to be photographed, carefully studying folders related to the case. However, at the same time, he demonstrated multiple instances of bizarre behavior, such as constantly smiling at the judge; answering questions in a high-pitched voice and demanding that the trial be held behind closed doors to avoid publicity regarding his mental illness. The judge, however, explained that this would not happen due to high public interest and transparency.

The victims' family members did not appear at the first court hearing, but their testimony was read out by prosecutors. Since Varakin had already been jailed for violent murders, he was labeled as a dangerous recidivist. Representatives of the prosecution stated that if the results of the psychiatric exam showed that Varakin was sane, they would push for a life term.

According to psychiatrists from the forensic medical examination commission, Varakin would avoid criminal responsibility, as mentally-ill people who commit violent crimes are interned at psychiatric institutions with intensive supervision. Medical lawyer Asad Yusufov later released a statement addressing why this decision happened.

In February 2025, Varakin was transferred to the Serbsky Center, where specialists worked with him for a month. Based on the results of a number of psychiatric examinations, it was established that he has schizophrenia, due to which he could not recognize the gravity of his actions. On the basis of this, on 13 March 2025, the Moscow City Court ruled that Varakin was unfit to stand trial and ordered him to be interned at a psychiatric institution.

== Internal investigation ==
After Varakin's arrest, due to public outcry caused by his crimes, discussions began in the State Duma on the need to strengthen control over patients who committed violent crimes, with the assertion that they should be supervised not only by doctors, but also law enforcement. Deputy Chairman Alexey Kurinny said at the end of December 2023 that he believes it would be advisable to transfer information about patients with criminal records from psychiatric clinics to the Ministry of Internal Affairs for parallel supervision.

Kurinny emphasized that the investigation will clarify the degree of stability of Varakin's mental state, and the doctors who issued the release order would be put under scrutiny. According to a number of lawyers, if any mistake is found and it is established that they released Varakin without the necessary requirements, the medical workers can be charged with criminal negligence and face penalties up to 10 years imprisonment.

== See also ==
- Dmytro Kulishov – similar case involving a violent offender with mental issues
- List of Russian serial killers
- List of serial killers active in the 2020s
