= Raul Meza Jr. =

American serial killer (born 1960)

- May 2023 mug shot of Meza
- Born: October 14, 1960 (age 65); Travis County, Texas, U.S.
- Status: Incarcerated
- Convictions: Capital murder Murder (2 counts)
- Penalty: Life imprisonment without parole

Details
- Victims: 3–13+
- Span of crimes: 1973–2023
- Country: United States
- State: Texas
- Date apprehended: May 29, 2023

Raul Meza Jr. (born October 14, 1960) is an American serial killer who was found guilty of the murder of Kendra Page, an 8-year-old in Austin, Texas, in January 1982. Meza had an extensive criminal record dating back to 1973 and, prior to his final incarceration, had spent a total of 20 years in prison for various crimes.

In September 2024, he was sentenced to life imprisonment for murdering 65-year-old Gloria Lofton in May 2019 and 80-year-old Jesse Fraga in May 2023. He is suspected of committing around ten other homicides.

== Early life ==
Raul Meza Jr. was born on October 14, 1960, in Travis County, Texas, to Raul Meza Sr. (d. unknown) and Elvia Ortiz (d. 2020). Records show that he had multiple stepfathers and multiple half-siblings by the time he was 15 years old. Meza started to use drugs when he was eight, and his first arrest was in 1973 for shoplifting and burglary; the following year, he was accused of arson.

His first major arrest came on December 31, 1975, when he robbed a convenience store on South Congress Avenue in Austin, Texas. During the robbery, he shot store attendant Derly Ramirez, who survived. Meza was sentenced to 20 years for the crime, but was released early on parole in February 1981.

A 1982 examination by psychologist David Poole read: "He doesn't appear to expect much of himself or his life, and seems a strong candidate at this point for a life of recidivism or ... suicidal inclinations."

== Murders ==
=== Murder of Kendra Page ===
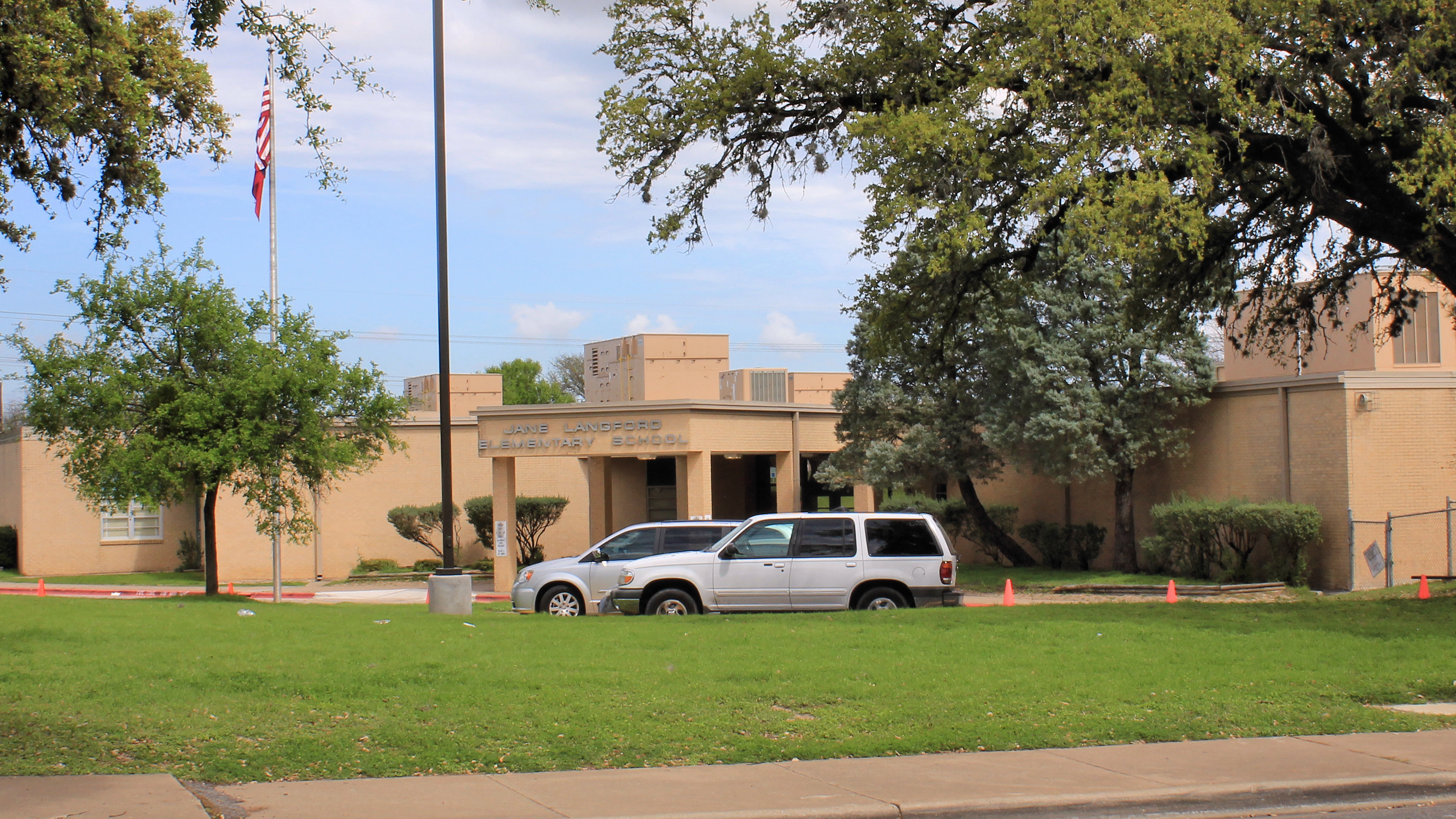
Page's remains were discovered in a dumpster at Langford Elementary School in Austin (pictured in 2017)

On January 3, 1982, Meza sexually assaulted and strangled 8-year-old Kendra Page. She was last seen riding her bicycle around Langford Elementary School in Austin and was later found dead in a dumpster at the school, naked and covered in bruises.

Three days later, Meza walked into the Austin Police Department (APD) headquarters and confessed to her murder. To avoid trial and a possible death sentence, a deal was struck between Meza's attorneys and the Travis County District Attorney's Office, and he received a prison sentence of 30 years.

After serving 11 years, he was paroled due to good behavior in 1993. Meza called a news conference to tell the public: "I can only tell you that in my heart, I know that I will not willfully bring harm to anyone again." He was subsequently driven out of several communities by angry residents, though he said he was a born-again Christian who paid his debt to society. In the following year, 1994, he was returned to prison for disobeying a midnight curfew and remained incarcerated until 2002.

=== Murder of Gloria Lofton ===
On May 9, 2019, 65-year-old Gloria Lofton was discovered dead in her home by her daughter. Blood was present in the hallway and on her pillow, and a used condom was found in her kitchen. The initial autopsy was inconclusive, and although there was evidence that she could have died due to strangulation, it was determined that she had died from an alcohol-related accident, as there was no solid evidence of murder. She was known to have an alcohol addiction.

After Meza confessed to her murder in 2023, the cause of death was updated to "homicide by strangulation". A rape kit during Lofton's autopsy provided a match to Meza's DNA in 2020. Still, nothing was done with this information, and the police provided no explanation.

In May 2023, following Meza's arrest, Lofton's daughter recalled a note she found in the home after she died, which read: "I Gloria Elizabeth Lofton give permission to Raul Meza Jr to request a certificate of authority on my behalf for the purpose of—". Meza would later tell a homicide detective that he was supposed to receive a quarter of an inheritance, with the rest supposedly going to Lofton's nephew. According to Lofton's daughter, she did not have a nephew; it is unclear whether this was a fabrication by Meza or whether he was promised money by one of Lofton's relatives.

=== Murder of Jesse Fraga ===
Eighty-year-old Jesse Fraga was an ex-Travis County probation officer who had become friends with Meza after his release from prison in 1993. The Fraga family, guided by "intense religious motivation", invited Meza to Bible studies and helped him find housing and employment. In 2021, Meza moved in with the Fragas, then after, Jesse's wife and son both died of COVID-19. Meza agreed to move out on May 12, 2023.

On May 20, the body of Jesse Fraga was discovered in the bathroom closet of his home by Pflugerville police officers after they received a call from his niece to conduct a welfare check, as she had not heard from him in nine days. In the home, a bloody knife and large amounts of dried blood was discovered by police. Ring doorbell video from May 13 showed Meza getting into Fraga's truck, which was found abandoned off I-35 nine days later. Inside the truck were boots covered in what was suspected by police to be blood. Meza's own car was found parked in the driveway of the Fraga residence with a hammer, hatchet, duct tape, and gloves inside.

== Final arrest, conviction, and other possible murders ==
On May 26, Meza demanded to speak with an APD homicide detective over the phone. During the call, he confessed to the murder of Lofton, claiming he was promised financial compensation for the murder, as well as to the murder of Fraga, due to supposed sexual activity between the two "[getting] out of hand", and a double homicide in San Antonio, of which he has not been convicted. Meza was arrested three days later while carrying a bag that contained a handgun, nylon rope, duct tape, zipties, a flashlight, and a condom. After his arrest, Meza told police that he was "ready and prepared to kill again".

In September 2024, Meza pleaded guilty to the murder of Fraga and "guilty to capital murder with the intent to commit sexual assault" for the murder of Lofton. He chose not to appeal and was sentenced to life imprisonment without parole. Judge Julie Kocurek wanted to know if Meza was apologetic, to which Meza replied, "I think it's too late. What's the use if a person will not accept it?"

In addition to the three murders he was convicted of, police suspect Meza of being responsible for as many as ten other homicides, two of which occurred in 2018 and one in the beginning of 2019. According to a search warrant, he was also responsible for several sexual assaults after his supervised release ended in 2016.

== See also ==
- List of serial killers active in the 2020s
- List of serial killers in the United States
