= Miguel Cortés Miranda =

Mexican bacteriologist, parasitologist and serial killer (1984–2025)

- Born: 25 October 1984; Mexico City, Mexico
- Died: 13 April 2025 (aged 40); Reclusorio Oriente, Mexico City, Mexico
- Cause of death: Heart attack caused by a drug overdose and head trauma
- Other names: "The Monster of Iztacalco" "The Demon of Iztacalco" "The Femicidal Chemist"
- Education: National Polytechnic Institute
- Conviction: N/A
- Penalty: N/A (died before trial)

Details
- Victims: 3+ (charged); 30+ (claimed)
- Span of crimes: 2012–2024
- Country: Mexico
- State: Mexico City
- Date apprehended: 16 April 2024

Miguel Cortés Miranda (25 October 1984 – 13 April 2025), known as The Monster of Iztacalco (Spanish: El monstruo de Iztacalco), was a Mexican suspected serial killer and bacteriological chemist who was implicated in the rape and murder of at least three young girls and women in Mexico City, all of which occurred between 2012 and 2024.

Caught after killing his final victim, he was indicted for two additional murders after police located human skeletal remains in his apartment and was under investigation for other homicides and missing persons cases. However, he died before being brought to trial in April 2025, leading to the investigation being prematurely closed.

== Early life ==
Relatively little is known about Cortés' early life. Born on 25 October 1984 in the Gustavo A. Madero borough of Mexico City, Cortés claimed that he and sister were victims of domestic violence while growing up.

In school, he studied to be a bacteriological chemist and parasitologist, and later graduated from the National School of Biological Sciences and the Instituto Politécnico Nacional. He was then able to find job opportunities around various labs in Mexico City.

=== Personality and psychological profile ===
Outwardly, Cortés boasted of his various academic, scientific and professional qualifications, and often participated in various recreational and social activities such as going to the cinema; theater; touring around the world; reading literature and learning new languages. He also professed to be an animal rights activist and openly stated his support for social causes such as feminism and LGBTQ rights. These actions led people around him to regard him as a positive, albeit quiet, man.

This contrasted sharply with his personal life, as unbeknownst to his associates, Cortés was visiting a therapist to deal with undisclosed issues. During one session, he claimed that he was estranged from his family and that at some point in his youth, he had supplied a suicidal friend of his with potentially lethal substances. He continued to reiterate this claim on his Facebook profile, in addition to claiming that he suffered from OCD, which has never been proven.

Following his arrest, psychological experts conducted interviews with Cortés and examined his postings on social media to better understand his psyche. According to their report, he exhibited violent antisocial traits and disturbing sexual inclinations, with one possibility being that he was a necrophile.

== Murders ==
Most of Cortés' confirmed and suspected victims were young to middle-aged women with whom he had some sort of acquaintance, including fellow students or colleagues. Alternatively, he also targeted prostitutes and the homeless. A defining feature of his crimes is that he published poetry on his Facebook account, which authorities believed alluded to his crimes.

The following is a list of his confirmed and alleged victims.

=== Victims ===
==== Confirmed ====
Identity	Date of disappearance	Age	Location	Notes
Amairany Roblero González	1 August 2012	18	Iztapalapa	Medical student. Cortés was indicted for her murder.
Frida Sofía Lima Rivera	7 February 2015	32	Iztacalco	Medical student. Cortés was indicted for her murder.
María José Castillo Calles	16 April 2024	17	Iztacalco	Raped, stabbed and strangled to death in her apartment. Her mother was also injured in the attack.

==== Alleged ====
Identity	Date of disappearance	Age	Location	Notes
Karen Ornelas Balzataz	2012	Undisclosed	Undisclosed	Undisclosed
Viviana Elizabeth Garrido Ibarra	30 November 2018	32	Iztacalco	Industrial bioengineer and colleague of Cortés. Last seen at a bus stop with him.
Norma Elena "O"	Undisclosed	41	Undisclosed	Undisclosed
Cinthia Vanesa "E"	Undisclosed	39	Undisclosed	Undisclosed
Laura "V"	Undisclosed	33	Undisclosed	Undisclosed
Claudia Andrea "A"	December 2019	36	Undisclosed	Ex-girlfriend of Cortés. Cause of death was initially ruled to be of natural causes.
Multiple unnamed victims	Undisclosed	Undisclosed	Undisclosed	Undisclosed

== Arrest and detention ==
His last confirmed murder occurred on 16 April 2024, when he broke into an apartment in Iztacalco belonging to his downstairs neighbor. There, he raped and stabbed 17-year-old María José Castillo Calles, after which he strangled her to death. The girl's mother, Cassandra Calles, discovered him in the act and was subsequently attacked as well. However, she managed to survive long enough for neighbors to arrive and detain Cortés.

While he was sent to the Reclusorio Oriente Prison to await charges, investigators decided to inspect his home, where they found 20 sets of human remains; five human skulls; several ID cards; cellphones and some notebooks, as well as surgical and medical equipment. At least two missing women were quickly identified as being among the deceased, but the amount of bones indicated that Cortés had likely killed more since his presumed first murder dating back to 2012.

Cortés was eventually charged with three murders: those were of Roblero, Lima and María Castillo. While awaiting trial, he supposedly boasted of killing more than 30 women in the span of twelve years. In addition to this, he also called the victims' family members and taunted them, saying that he had no regrets for the killings.

During his detention, Cortés was kept in solitary confinement and was under constant surveillance due to the high-profile nature of his case, due to which he was supplied with his necessary medication by the prison's Medical Service. He was disliked and viewed as arrogant by other inmates, openly admired Ted Bundy and Jeffrey Dahmer and insisted on reading serial killer-related media, including a book titled Manual of Serial Murder: Criminological Aspects by Juan Francisco Alcaraz Albertos.

Despite this, he was allowed visits by Castillo's mother and her lawyer, in which he answered all of her questions calmly and politely.

=== Death ===
On the morning of 13 April 2025, Cortés was found on the floor of his cell in Reclusorio Oriente and immediately rushed to the General Hospital of Iztapalapa, where he later died. His cause of death was attributed to a cardiac arrest brought on by overdosing on prescription medication, aggravated by a head injury he sustained when he fell off his bunk bed.

Due to the sudden nature of his death, Mexican authorities launched an investigation to determine whether there was anything suspicious surrounding it. At the time of his death, Cortés was scheduled to appear at a court hearing and was under investigation for making phone calls to his victims' relatives. As a result of his death, investigations into his case ceased.

== See also ==
- List of serial killers by country
- List of serial killers active in the 2020s
