= Denis Kazungu =

Rwandan serial killer

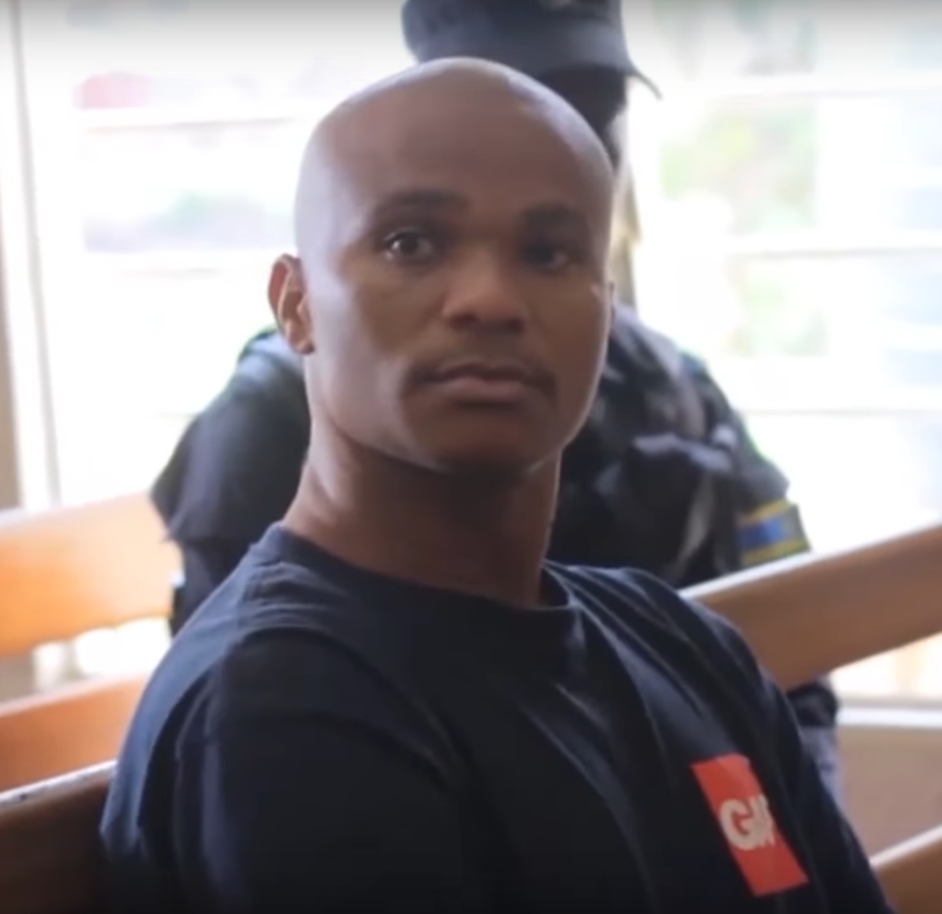
- Born: c. 1989 (age 36–37)
- Years active: 2022–2023
- Status: Incarcerated
- Conviction: Murder x14
- Penalty: Life imprisonment

Details
- Victims: 14
- Country: Rwanda
- States: Gashikiri, Kicukiro District, Kigali
- Date apprehended: 5 September 2023

Denis Kazungu is a Rwandan serial killer who murdered 14 people, most of whom were women. At the time of his arrest, he ran a motorcycle spare parts shop.

== Murders ==
From April 2022 until the day of his arrest, Kazungu rented a house in Gashikiri, in the Kanombe sector of Kicukiro District, where he lured his victims. At least three women were able to escape from the house. Neighbours informed Mutwarasibo, a local leader, but the events were dismissed as mere disputes between Kazungu and sex workers.

Kazungu had been arrested in July 2023 on suspicion of rape, robbery, theft, and use of threats. However, he was granted bail due to lack of evidence until 5 September, when the police arrested him again. Two days later, it was announced that fourteen bodies had been found in a hole in the kitchen of his home he rented. When Kazungu was arrested, he stated that he lured his victims from a bar to his home then raped, robbed and murdered them. On 21 September 2023, Kazungu pleaded guilty in the murders. Kazungu was sentenced to life imprisonment on 8 March 2024.

On 18 March 2025, Kazungu's defence team filed an appeal, claiming that their client should have been given a more lenient sentence on account of his full cooperation with authorities and apparent remorse, which they cited as a mitigating factor. The High Court in Kigali rejected the appeal on 11 July, upholding the life sentence.

== See also ==
- List of serial killers by country
- List of serial killers active in the 2020s
