= Dmitry Kazakov =

Russian serial killer

- Born: Dmitry Gennadyevich Kazakov; 7 May 1972; Iskitim, Novosibirsk Oblast, RSFSR
- Died: 9 August 2022 (aged 50); SIZO-1, Novosibirsk, Novosibirsk Oblast, Russia
- Cause of death: Suicide
- Convictions: Various for burglary, none for murder
- Penalty: Various for burglary, none for murder

Details
- Victims: 6
- Span of crimes: 2009–2021
- Country: Russia
- States: Novosibirsk, Tomsk
- Date apprehended: 8 June 2021

Dmitry Gennadyevich Kazakov (Russian: Дмитрий Геннадьевич Казаков; 7 May 1972 – 9 August 2022) was a Russian serial killer and robber who committed six robbery-murders in Novosibirsk and Tomsk Oblasts between 2009 and 2021.

After his arrest, Kazakov admitted responsibility for the crimes and actively cooperated with investigators, but committed suicide shortly before his trial was due to begin.

== Early life ==
Dmitry Kazakov was born on 7 May 1972 in Iskitim, Novosibirsk Oblast, the second of three children. His parents, Gennady and Tatiana, worked at a secret machine-building plant in the city, belonging to one of the space industry of the USSR. While neither parents exhibited any negative influence on their children, the family was not well-off financially.

As a teenager, Kazakov began to show signs of kleptomania, and by the late 1980s, he began committing stealing from homes and stores, for which he was imprisoned several times. In one case, he was arrested for breaking and entering a store, and in another, he was detained by police officers for burgling into a house through a window vent.

=== Adult life ===
Kazakov led an antisocial lifestyle, abused alcohol, and was often arrested on charges of disturbing the peace and imprisoned in the local detention center. During this period, one of his girlfriends became pregnant and subsequently gave birth to a daughter, but as neither he nor the girlfriend wanted to take care of the child, it was sent off to Kazakov's parents, who later adopted her.

Kazakov made a living by stealing and speculating, trying to become a professional thief. In the late 1990s, he married another woman, who bore him a son. In 2007, he carried out first known robbery with the help of a school friend, with whom he robbed the "Olimp" company office in Iskitim. After breaking the door using tools, a masked Kazakov started to move the money from the safe, while his accomplice tied up the female security guard, threatening her with a toy gun. The two men stole a total of 1,366,600 rubles and successfully fled, later dividing the spoils between them.

Despite the fact almost all of his conscious life he never worked and earned his living by stealing, Kazakov always managed to evade attention by law enforcement and was never suspected in any violent crimes.

His wife and mother-in-law later claimed that he financially supported the family without having any known legal job. The question of where the money originated from was allegedly never discussed, despite the fact that at the turn of 2010, Kazakov bought a BMW X5, a snowmobile and a motorcycle. In 2011, he was arrested for drunk driving, and as he refused to undergo a medical examination, he was deprived of his driving license.

== Murders ==
=== Initial murders ===
Kazakov committed his first murder in May 2009 during a robbery at the office Energomontazh office in Novosibirsk. He entered the premises through a balcony on the second floor and confronted a security guard, whom he brutally beat with a rock, inflicting a head injury that led to the guard's death. His loot was more than 600,000 rubles.

In October 2009, he broke into the building of the "PSK Berezka" company in Novosibirsk, where he severely beat up a security guard, tied him up, and stole more than 100,000 rubles from the cash register. After Kazakov left, the bound man was unable to free himself and succumbed to the injuries he sustained in the attack.

In December 2010, Kazakov was surveilling the office of the Kudryashovskoye company office in the village of Krivodanovka. When he realized that the security guard might be armed, Kazakov purchased a shotgun and decided to shoot the man immediately after entering the building. Upon doing so, the male security guard was shot in the head, after which Kazakov stole 500,000 rubles.

In March 2011, Kazakov decided to rob the office of "Metapribor" in Novosibirsk. After breaking the lock and entering the building, he brutally beat up and tied up the guard, but did not find any money, as the company owner did not keep any cash in the building. The injured watchman managed to survive and was driven to the hospital, but his condition deteriorated several days later and he later succumbed to his injuries. Despite the brutality of the crime, Kazakov left no noticeable traces that could lead to his arrest.

=== Iskitim robbery ===
On 6 March 2012, Kazakov committed a daring robbery of the post office building in the industrial microdistrict of Iskitim. Kazakov claimed that while passing by the post office building in the afternoon, he happened to notice two collection vehicles driving into the yard of the post office, which brought several bags of money into the building, after which he decided to commit the robbery. In the evening of the same day, he went to the post office again and observed the situation inside the building for a few minutes. While doing so, he noticed that there was a single female security guard.

A few hours later, Kazakov again went to the post office building, taking with him the necessary tools for a break-in – a tire iron, chisels, screwdrivers and an angle grinder. After breaking the lock with the tire iron, he entered the building and attacked the watchman, during which he tied her up and pulled a hat over her eyes so that the woman could not see and remember his appearance. After threatening the woman, Kazakov was shown the room with the cash register. After breaking down the door, he entered inside and found a bag of money that the collectors had failed to place in the safe – the contents consisted of 5,625,000 rubles in pensions.

At the moment the door to the cash register was opened, an alarm went off, prompting Kazakov to flee. He was spotted fleeing by security guards who arrived at the scene and was engaged in a chase, but he managed to escape. When he arrived home, Kazakov changed his clothes and moved the money into a potato sack before driving to the nearby woods, where he burned his clothes and the bag carrying the money. Unbeknownst to him, his fingerprints were left behind on some of the tools he had used to defend the bag during the escape, after which his identity was quickly established and he was arrested.

==== Trial and imprisonment ====
During the interrogation, Kazakov admitted guilt and showed the police officers where he had hidden the money, but by that time he had managed to spend approximately 102,095 rubles.

In July 2012, Kazakov was convicted of the robbery and was sentenced to 7 years imprisonment. He served his sentence in a strict-regime colony, where he committed several offenses. As a result, he was charged with additional crimes and had an additional year added to his sentence.

After serving out the sentence in full, Kazakov was released in March 2020. However, as he had no job, he resumed his life of crime in June of that year by breaking into an apartment in Iskitim, from which he stole money and jewelry that he later successfully sold.

=== 2020s murders ===
On the night of 26–27 September 2020, Kazakov robbed a cottage on Naberezhny Residential Street in Iskitim, where Alexei Kaigorodov, the chief physician of the Iskitim City Hospital, lived. Kazakov broke into the house at night through the window, silently squeezing out the frame with the help of two chisels. For several days before he had carefully studied the place and the daily routine of the Kaigorodovs.

While inspecting the house, he found the landlady, 66-year-old Lyudmila Kaigorodova, asleep in the bedroom, whom he woke up and tied up with rope. After Lyudmila began to scream loudly, Kazakov struck her several times on the head with a crowbar, causing a head injury that led to the woman's death. After the murder, Kazakov searched the house, stole money and a number of items of value and fled. The woman's bloody corpse was found by her husband when he returned home from hunting that morning.

Kaigorodova's murder caused a public outcry in Russia, further exacerbated by initial reports that she had been tortured by her killers. The investigation was undertaken by the chairman of the Investigative Committee of Russia, Alexander Bastrykin, and on his instructions, the case was transferred to the central office of the agency. After several examinations, the perpetrator's DNA was linked to Dmitry Kazakov through some blood samples. He was then put on a federal and then an international wanted list.

In the meantime, Kazakov left the Novosibirsk Oblast and moved to Tomsk, Tomsk Oblast. On the night of 1–2 June 2021, he broke the front door of the Tomsk House-Building Company using locksmithing tools. Once he entered inside, Kazakov killed 60-year-old watchman Grigory Emelyanov, and stole a safe containing more than 600,000 rubles.

== Arrest, detention and confessions ==
Kazakov was arrested on 8 June 2021 at a rented apartment in Tomsk by criminal investigation officers of the Ministry of Internal Affairs, with support from the National Guard of Russia. Kazakov did not resist his arrest and cooperated with investigators. While searching his apartment, officers found some of the missing money in a closet and a bag of locksmithing tools.

During the interrogation, Kazakov pleaded guilty to the charges against him and provided the investigators with information about the other murders, in which he had never been a suspect. He also stated that he planned another robbery in Tomsk, with his intended target being a high-ranking official that he had been observing for several days. The man's name and address were found on a piece of paper inside Kazakov's rented apartment.

Kazakov stated that he had committed the murders out of desire to steal. In the course of the investigation, he suddenly expressed remorse for what he had done and revealed that he had recently started feeling depressed and remorseful for being a serial killer. He also claimed to see the victims in his sleep.

=== Suicide ===
In February 2022, investigators completed the criminal case and the regional prosecutor's office approved the charges against Dmitry Kazakov. The trial was scheduled to begin at the end of August 2022.

Shortly before the trial was set to begin on 9 August 2022, Kazakov committed suicide at the FSU SIZO-1 in Novosibirsk. The medical personnel who arrived at the scene carried out resuscitation measures, but were unable to save his life. Employees at the detention center stated that Kazakov had repeatedly showed signs that he intended to end his life due to the fact that he faced a likely sentence of life imprisonment.

== See also ==
- List of Russian serial killers
