= Sean Lannon =

American serial killer (born 1974)

Sean M. Lannon
- Born: March 3, 1974 (age 52)
- Convictions: New Jersey; Murder; New Mexico; Second degree murder (4 counts)
- Penalty: New Jersey; 35 years imprisonment New Mexico; 60 years imprisonment

Details
- Victims: 5 convicted 16 claimed
- Span of crimes: January – March 2021
- Country: United States
- States: New Mexico and New Jersey

Sean M. Lannon (born March 3, 1974) is an American serial killer who killed at least five people in New Mexico and New Jersey, including his ex-wife, but has claimed to have killed 16.

== Crimes ==
On March 5, 2021, the bodies of four people were found in a vehicle at the Albuquerque International Sunport parking garage. They were identified as Jennifer Lannon (née Whitman), 39, who was Lannon's ex-wife, Matthew Miller, 21, Jesten Mata, 40, and Randall Apostalon, 60, three of whom were reported missing in January. Three days later, 66-year-old Michael Dabkowski was found bludgeoned to death at his home in East Greenwich Township, New Jersey. Lannon was arrested two days later in Missouri after he was caught driving Dabkowski's car, which he had stolen. Following his arrest, he was brought back to New Jersey, where he claimed to have killed 16 people, 15 of whom were in New Mexico. Lannon also claimed to have been sexually abused as a minor by Dabkowski.

== Trials ==
Lannon was first put on trial for Dabkowski's murder in New Jersey. In October 2022, Lannon pleaded guilty to the murder and was sentenced to 35 years in prison two months later. Following that, he was brought back to New Mexico to face trial for the other murders. Investigators believe he killed and dismembered Jennifer Lannon, Mata, and Miller, then had Apostolan load the remains into a pickup truck before being killed himself. In May 2024, Lannon pleaded guilty to the remaining murders and was given four consecutive 15-year sentences for each victim. As part of the plea agreement, Lannon will serve his 35-year sentence in New Jersey, then be returned to New Mexico to serve the 60-year combined total sentence.

== Victims ==
The following is a chronology of Lannon's crimes.

- Jennifer Lannon (née Whitman), 39 - January 2021, Grants, New Mexico
- Jesten Mata, 40 - January 2021, Grants, New Mexico
- Matthew Miller, 21 - January 2021, Grants, New Mexico
- Randall Apostalon, 60 - February 2021, Albuquerque, New Mexico
- Michael Dabkowski, 66 - March 8, 2021, East Greenwich Township, New Jersey

== See also ==
- List of serial killers in the United States
