= José Tiago Correia Soroka =

Brazilian serial killer

- Convictions: Murder x3 Robbery
- Penalty: 104 years imprisonment

Details
- Victims: 3
- Span of crimes: April – May 2021
- Country: Brazil
- States: Santa Catarina, Paraná
- Date apprehended: 29 May 2021

José Tiago Correia Soroka is a Brazilian serial killer and thief sentenced to 104 years in prison for the murder of three gay men, one in Santa Catarina and two in Paraná. He has been imprisoned since 2021.

He is also sometimes referred to as "Coringa" (Joker) or "Japa".

== Biography ==
The father of two children, Soroka was born in the municipality of Palmas, in the south of Paraná, having moved as a child to Abelardo Luz, Santa Catarina, where he committed his first murder. At the time of the crimes, he lived in Almirante Tamandaré, in the Greater Curitiba area. Soroka already had a criminal record, for robbery, in 2015 and 2019, and also a protective measure that had been requested by an ex-girlfriend.

== Crimes ==
Soroka killed three men, all homosexuals who lived alone. He arranged meetings through dating apps and when he arrived at the victims' homes, he suffocated them and then stole their belongings. Soroka murdered teacher Robson Olivino on 16 April 2021, in Abelardo Luz, Santa Catarina. On 27 April, he murdered nurse David Júnior Alves Levisio, in Curitiba. Seven days later, he murdered medical student Marco Vinício Bozzana da Fonseca, in Curitiba.

== Investigation and arrest ==
On 11 May, in the Bigorrilho neighborhood, in Curitiba, Soroka tried to kill his fourth victim, an architect. However, the man managed to escape and contacted the police. Images from security cameras later linked Soroka to the locations of the other crimes, in addition to being identified by the victim who managed to escape. The same images were released by the police to help in the search for the criminal, who was at large. Soroka was eventually found and arrested in the Capão Raso neighborhood, on 29 May 2021.

== Trial and sentence ==
At 33 years of age, Soroka went on trial in July 2022, when in a sentence handed down by judge Cristine Lopes on 8 July, in which he was sentenced to 104 years and four months in prison for the crimes of robbery, aggravated robbery and extortion.

== See also ==
- List of serial killers by country
