= Mahin Qadiri =

Iranian serial killer (1977–2010)

- Born: 1977; Qazvin, Iran
- Died: December 20, 2010 (aged 32–33); Qazvin Central Prison, Qazvin, Iran
- Cause of death: Execution by hanging
- Convictions: Murder x6 Robbery x6
- Penalty: Death

Details
- Victims: 6
- Span of crimes: 2006; February – May 2009
- Country: Iran
- State: Qazvin
- Date apprehended: May 15, 2009

Mahin Qadiri (Persian: مهین قدیری) (1977 – December 20, 2010) was an Iranian serial killer who was convicted of robbing and killing six elderly people (one man in 2006, and five women between February and May 2009) in Qazvin. She was subsequently convicted, sentenced to death and promptly hanged in 2010.

== Early life ==
Mahin Qadiri was born in Qazvin in 1977, the third in a family of eight children. Little is known of her early life, but she is known to have studied until the third grade, was married by the age of 14 and had two daughters. Despite her lack of proper education, Qadiri was noted for her intelligence, complex personality and unconditional love for her family. This was especially directed towards her disabled daughter Fatemeh, who suffered from fevers since she was very little.

While her marriage was stable and she was on good terms with family members, it was known that Qadiri had a costly spending habit and was frequently in debt. This was tolerated to a certain extent, but it eventually became so out of hand that her husband stopped supporting her financially and he refused to let her have the parental inheritance.

== Murders ==
Without a source of income to pay off her mounting debts, Qadiri decided that the quickest way to find money was to steal valuable items and then resell them. As victims, she would often choose the elderly, as they were frail and less likely to put up a challenging fight.

Qadiri's first murder was committed in 2006 when she strangled and robbed an elderly man in Qazvin, for which she was immediately arrested and charged with murder. However, the court had insufficient evidence to prove that she was the culprit beyond a reasonable doubt, and she was acquitted.

For the next three years, she is not known to have committed any violent crimes, before embarking on a killing spree lasting from February 6 to May 6, 2009. Qadiri's modus operandi consisted of driving her yellow Renault 5 around various imamzadehs in Qazvin and singling out elderly women who wore any golden ornaments or similar jewellery. After picking a suitable victim, she would offer to give them a ride home, often complimenting about how kind they were or how much they reminded her of her mother, before offering a juice box laced with an anaesthetic. Once the victim was paralyzed or otherwise unable to properly fight back, Qadiri would proceed to strangle them using her headscarf or her bare hands. Her first murder victim fell out of the car since she was placed in the front seat, and so, for the four that followed, would have them sat in the back, where it was also less visible by any potential passers-by.

== Investigation and arrest ==
On May 11, 2009, Qadiri gave a ride to a 60-year-old woman to whom she offered one of her poisoned drinks. However, the woman vehemently refused, and asked to be dropped off when she noticed that her benefactor was driving in the wrong direction. After hearing that a serial killer had been killing elderly women in a similar fashion, the woman notified police, describing her would-be assailant's car as a Renault. After obtaining this information, the police inspected more than 27,000 cars inside the country, as they considered the possibility that the perpetrator might not be from Qazvin.

Eventually, authorities identified a cream-coloured Renault as the one that had been seen at one of the murder sites. As a result, they tracked it down to Qadiri, who was arrested in the early morning of May 15 at her home in the Minoodar area. While inspecting her home, investigators found newspaper articles detailing her crimes, as well as other articles and writings about other serial killers.

She confessed to all six crimes, claiming that she killed only when she was in dire need of money to pay off her debts or to treat her daughter's illness, and that a burden had been lifted off her shoulders when she was finally caught. Later on, Qadiri revealed that she had also done it out of hatred for her mother, who had placed her in this harsh financial situation.

== Trial, imprisonment and execution ==
Qadiri was charged and subsequently convicted on six counts of premeditated murder, for which she was given the death sentence. In addition, she was convicted on six counts of robbery, for which she was sentenced to 24 months imprisonment and 74 lashes. Journalists were barred from attending the press conferences and hearings, which received a significant amount of backlash from the press and public.

After failing to appeal her sentence, Qadiri was hanged at the Qazvin Central Prison on December 20, 2010.

== In the media ==
A documentary titled Mahin, directed by Mohammad Hossein Heidari and produced by the Awj Art Media Organization, was made to document the killer's life. It would subsequently win three awards (Best Film, Best Director and Best Artistic Achievement) at the 7th Shahr International Film Festival, and finished second place for the Best Film award at the Haghighat Film Festival.

== See also ==
- List of serial killers by country
