= Maina Ramulu =

Indian serial killer

- Born: 1976 (age 49–50); Arutla village, Telangana, India
- Occupation: Stone-cutter
- Years active: 2003–2018 (confirmed); 2003–2020 (alleged)
- Status: Incarcerated
- Convictions: Murder (x16); Larceny (x4); Escaping police custody
- Criminal charges: Murder (x2)
- Penalty: Life imprisonment
- Escaped: December 2011
- Escape end: May 13, 2013

Details
- Victims: 16–18
- Country: India
- State: Telangana
- Date apprehended: October 14, 2009; May 13, 2013; 2018; January 26, 2021

Maina Ramulu (born 1976) is an Indian serial killer who murdered 16 to 18 women in India during three to four separate murder sprees.

Between 2003 and 2009, Ramulu murdered nine women in Hyderabad, India. He was later caught given a life sentence, but he escaped from a psychiatric hospital in 2011 and murdered five more women. In 2013, Ramulu was caught again and received a life sentence. However, after filing an appeal with the Telangana high court, he was released from prison in 2018 and murdered two more women that year. Ramulu was released again and is now suspected of murdering two more women in 2020.

== Early life ==
Ramulu was born in Arutla village, Telangana, India. When he was older, he worked as a stone-cutter.

When Maina Ramulu was 21-years-old, his family arranged a marriage for him. However, a few days after their wedding, his wife eloped with another man. This caused Ramulu to develop a hatred for women. He started to harass women, and began murdering them in 2003.

== Murders ==
=== First murder spree (2003–2009) ===
Maina Ramulu started murdering women in Hyderabad, India, in 2003. His modus operandi consisted of finding single women in toddy shops and drinking with them. After the women were intoxicated, Ramulu would wait for everyone else in the toddy shop to leave, and then strangle his victims to death with their saris and steal their valuables.

After murdering a woman in September 2009, police apprehended him in the Raiduragam toddy compound on October 14, 2009. The police then retrieved a pair of silver circlets, a pair of ear studs, four silver rings, two motorcycles, and a Nokia phone from Ramulu's home. Ramulu confessed to the murders, but claimed to have done so unknowingly while inebriated. Ramulu was sentenced to life in prison for the murders on February 21, 2011, and taken to the Central Cherlapally Prison to live out his sentence.

=== Second murder spree (2012–2013) ===
In February 2011, Ramulu was admitted to a psychiatric hospital for treatment. In December of that year, Ramulu and five other inmates escaped from the hospital. After his escape, he murdered five more women in Bowenpally, Chandanagar, and Dundigal. On May 13, 2013, he was apprehended by the Bowenpally police and sent back to prison.

=== Third murder spree (2018) ===
Following an appeal petition filed with the high court of Telangana, Ramulu was released from prison in 2018. While free, he murdered two more women in Shamirpet and Patancheru. He was subsequently arrested and sent back to prison again.

=== Fourth alleged murder spree (2020) ===
In 2020, Ramulu filed another appeal with the Telangana high court, and was released from prison on July 31, 2020. Ramulu is now accused of murdering two more women in 2020. On December 10, 2020, he allegedly met a woman at a toddy shop in Bala Nagar. After he offered to pay her money in exchange for sex, the two went to a secluded area of the Japta Singayapalli village, where he strangled her to death. The victim is still unidentified, and estimated to be between 35 and 45-years-old. Then, on December 30, 2020, Ramulu allegedly met Kavala Venkatamama, 50, at the Yousufguda toddy shop in Jubilee Hills. The two then went to an isolated area of the Ankushapur village, where he beat her to death with a boulder.

After the bodies of the victims were found, the Hyderabad and Rachakonda police departments formed a task force to catch the perpetrator. They identified Maina Ramulu as the perpetrator after reviewing CCTV footage, which showed him with the two women shortly before their deaths. He was then arrested on January 26, 2021, and charged with the two murders.
