= Freddrick Jackson =

American serial killer

Freddrick Sanjuan Jackson
- Born: July 11, 2004 (age 22); Arkansas, U.S.
- Other name: Fredo
- Convictions: First degree murder (4 counts); Possession of a firearm by a certain person (4 counts)
- Penalty: 50 years' imprisonment

Details
- Victims: 4
- Span of crimes: 2020–2022
- Country: United States
- State: Arkansas
- Date apprehended: April 12, 2022
- Imprisoned at: Ouachita River Unit

Freddrick Sanjuan Jackson (born July 11, 2004) is an American serial killer who fatally shot four people in Little Rock, Arkansas, between June 2020 and April 2022. He pleaded guilty and was sentenced to 50 years in prison. Under Arkansas law, he is required to serve 70 percent of his sentence before becoming eligible for parole. Because he was a juvenile at the time, he will have his first parole hearing in 2047 after serving 25 years.

== Early life ==
Police records show that Little Rock police were called about Jackson seven times between 2015 and 2018. The records describe incidents in which he allegedly threatened to punch an assistant principal at age 11 and was involved in fights at age 14 that left another student with a swollen eye. He was also cited in multiple incidents on charges including disorderly conduct, third-degree battery, and theft by receiving. In some cases, his parents were called, and in others he was suspended from school. Jackson's uncle Bradley Blackshire was fatally shot by a Little Rock police officer in 2019, and his pregnant mother was shot and killed in 2020.

== Victims ==
Jackson was convicted of the following killings:

- Nicholas Jones, June 2, 2020
- Daishaun Allen, June 15, 2020
- Danhtay Stanley, February 20, 2021
- Dolan Goff, April 7, 2022

== Reactions ==
Little Rock mayor Frank Scott Jr. addressed the Little Rock Board of Directors about Jackson, stating that "one of the individuals that's causing a lot of the crime, one of the most violent people in our city, is 17 years old."

== See also ==
- List of youngest killers
- List of serial killers in the United States
