= Kumarbek Abdyrov =

Kyrgyzstani serial killer (1984–2026)

- Born: Kumarbek Kubatbekovich Abdyrov; 9 September 1984; Issyk-Kul Region, Kyrgyz SSR
- Died: 7 February 2026 (aged 41); Bishkek, Kyrgyzstan
- Other name: "The Bishkek Monster"
- Penalty: Committed suicide before trial

Details
- Victims: 5(including the unborn child)
- Span of crimes: 2011–2025
- Country: Kyrgyzstan
- Date apprehended: October 2025

Kumarbek Kubatbekovich Abdyrov (Kyrgyz: Кумарбек Кубатбекович Абдыров; 9 September 1984 – 7 February 2026) was a Kyrgyzstani serial killer who, according to investigators, committed at least four murders of girls and women, accompanied by rape, in the period from 12 February 2011 to 27 September 2025, in Bishkek and its environs. After his arrest in 2025, Abdyrov admitted his guilt in all crimes against him and actively cooperated with the investigation, facilitating the solution of the crimes, but committed suicide on 7 February 2026. He was known by the nickname "Bishkek Monster". The arrest and exposure of Abdyrov in a series of murders caused a public outcry in Kyrgyzstan, during which the President of Kyrgyzstan Sadyr Japarov proposed reintroducing the death penalty in the republic, but the country's Constitutional Court declared such a change in the law unacceptable.

== Early life ==
Abdyrov was born on 9 September 1984, in the Issyk-Kul Region (Kyrgyz SSR). He was an only child. He spent his childhood and adolescence in a socially advantaged environment. After finishing school, Abdyrov enrolled in a Bishkek university, graduating in the mid-2000s. However, despite receiving a higher education, Abdyrov failed to achieve significant success in his professional field. In the following years, he changed several professions and jobs, often earning a living as a private taxi driver. Beginning in the early 2000s, Abdyrov demonstrated a pathologically heightened attraction to women, which soon led to him assaulting them.

== Attacks ==
In 2006, Abdyrov, then a university student, assaulted a young woman in the Kok-Zhar neighborhood of Bishkek. During the attack, he struck her with an iron bar and stole her phone, but the victim survived. Abdyrov was arrested during the investigation, but his relatives reached a settlement with the victim, resulting in him receiving only administrative charges and a fine of 5,000 soms. He subsequently married, but his intimate life with his wife failed to satisfy his sexual needs, leading him to systematically pursue other women. In 2015, Abdyrov again assaulted a young woman. During the attempted rape, he tied up the victim, but she managed to break free and fiercely resisted. He then pushed her into a canal and threw a large rock after her, injuring her arm. She survived, managed to get to the road and reach a gas station, where employees provided her with first aid and took her to the hospital. Based on her testimony and a number of other evidence, Kumarbek Abdyrov was soon arrested and convicted. On 11 February 2016, the Oktyabrsky District Court of Bishkek sentenced him to 12 years in prison. Subsequently, Abdyrov's sentence was reduced to 7 years in prison at the request of the prosecutor. After serving 3 years in prison, he was released in 2018 under an amnesty, after which he returned back to Bishkek. At that time, he was suspected of involvement in other attacks and murders, since, according to the testimony of the victim of the 2015 attack, Abdyrov told her the following during the attempted rape "How did you untie the rope? No one has ever managed to do it before?!"

== Murders ==
In committing all of his murders, Abdyrov demonstrated a distinct modus operandi. He targeted young girls and women, whom he would pick up in his car while driving or simply offering them a ride. After Abdyrov secured a victim, he would drive them to a remote area, where he would tie them up, sexually assault them, and strangle them . According to investigators, Abdyrov committed his first murder on 12 February 2011, in the village of Orok. Abdyrov's victim was a 22-year-old Bishkek resident, eight months pregnant at the time of her death. He raped and murdered her. Abdyrov dumped her body in a field, where it was discovered a month later, on March 14 of that year. On 10 March 2014, Abdyrov committed a second murder in Bishkek. The victim was 19-year-old Kamila Duishebaeva, whom he raped and strangled with her own scarf. He took her body to the outskirts of the village of Baitik, where he dumped it in a field. Kalybek Salyanov, the brother of former Prosecutor General Aida Salyanova, who had been romantically involved with Duishebaeva, was then suspected of committing the murder. However, Salyanov later proved his innocence. Three days after Kamila Duishebaeva's murder, Kumarbek Abdyrov, following the same pattern, raped and strangled a 22-year-old woman, dumping her body on Razzakov Street in Bishkek. A plastic bag was found over the raped and strangled woman's head, and her hands were tied behind her back. Abdyrov left her shoes and belt on the pavement nearby. However, Abdyrov’s involvement in these murders was established only 11 years later.

Abdyrov's last victim was 17-year-old Aisuluu Mukasheva, who disappeared on 27 September 2025, in Kyrgyzstan's Issyk-Kul region. On the day of her disappearance, she decided to hitchhike to visit a friend in a neighboring village and got into Abdyrov's Honda Stream. He tricked her into taking her to an apple orchard in the village of Zhenish and raped her. He then drove her to a pond located east of the village of Kadji-Sai, where he raped her again and strangled her. Abdyrov stole Mukasheva's cell phone. After committing the murder, Abdyrov buried Mukasheva's body on the shore of Lake Issyk-Kul, but a few hours later he returned, dug up the body and threw it into the Boom Gorge, on the 14th kilometer of the Zhel-Aryk highway in the Kemin district of the Chui region, where it was discovered on September 29 of the same year.

== Arrest and investigation ==
Abdyrov was arrested on the outskirts of Bishkek on charges of murdering Mukasheva in October 2025. His arrest was based on surveillance footage from a gas station at the entrance to the village of Barskoon. The footage captured Mukasheva getting into Abdyrov's car. By the time of his arrest, he had washed the car, discarded Mukasheva's SIM card, and sold her phone. During his first interrogation, Abdyrov confessed to murdering Mukasheva and also confessed to three other murders. He also claimed that in the early 2020s, he forced a young woman from Bishkek into his car, drove her to a field, raped her, and left her alive. Law enforcement agencies questioned Abdyrov's account, as no rape reports had been filed during the period he cited, but investigators subsequently suggested that the woman may not have reported the rape to the police. Following Abdyrov's exposure, Kyrgyz President Sadyr Japarov took personal control of the investigation into the series of murders and instructed Murat Ukushev, head of the presidential administration's legal department, to draft legislative amendments. The president stated that he deeply regretted the news of the murder of Mukasheva, committed with particular cruelty.

In November 2025, Abdyrov and his close relatives confessed and detailed the corruption scheme that allowed him to evade justice after attacking a girl in 2015. Based on their testimony, two judges of the Bishkek City Court, who in 2016 had reduced Abdyrov's criminal sentence by their ruling, were soon arrested, as was the prosecutor who had filed a corresponding petition with the court. The judges were charged with committing crimes under Articles 336 (Corruption) and 352 (Issuing an unjust verdict or other judicial act) of the Criminal Code of the Kyrgyz Republic, and the prosecutor was charged with committing a crime under Article 336 (Corruption) of the Criminal Code of the Kyrgyz Republic.

== Death ==
On 7 February 2026, at approximately 12:30 p.m., Abdyrov committed suicide by hanging himself with his own pants while in his cell at Pretrial Detention Center No. 1 in Bishkek. Staff attempted to provide Abdyrov with first aid, but were unable to save him. Abdyrov's death was confirmed by the State Penitentiary Service, which reported that a GSIN investigative team and representatives of the prosecutor's office were present at the scene of the suicide, and that a number of forensic examinations and an internal investigation had been conducted.
