= Ji Chun-gil =

Executed South Korean serial killer

- Born: 1943; Daegu, Yeongam, Korea, Empire of Japan
- Died: November 2, 1995 (aged 51–52); Seoul Detention Center, Uiwang, South Korea
- Cause of death: Execution by hanging
- Conviction: Murder x6
- Penalty: Life imprisonment; changed to the death sentence

Details
- Victims: 6
- Span of crimes: March – October 1990
- Country: South Korea
- State: North Gyeongsang
- Date apprehended: November 2, 1990

Ji Chun-gil (Korean: 지춘길; 1943 – November 2, 1995) was a South Korean serial killer who, from March to October 1990, killed six elderly women in Andong during robberies, burning their apartments in an attempt to cover his tracks. Initially sentenced to life imprisonment for his crimes, it was changed to a death sentence on appeal, leading to his subsequent execution in 1995.

== Early life ==
Born in Daegu in 1943, Ji was orphaned at an early age and as nobody took care of him, he spent the entirety of his childhood and adolescence doing whatever he pleased. He often travelled around Daegu and eventually resorted to small-time crime, getting his arrest for theft in 1960, spending some time in a juvenile detention center. For the next 20 years, Ji would be repeatedly incarcerated for a variety of offences, spending a majority of his time behind bars.

In the fall of 1989, he was released from the Cheongsong Detention Center, whereupon he is said to have attempted to adapt to society, but his criminal record and impoverished financial status prevented him from finding a job. Embittered and with a growing feeling of disdain, Ji began living at a house in Songhyeon-dong in Daegu, where he kept himself isolated from others.

== Murders ==
On March 7, 1990, at around 1 AM, Ji broke into a house located in a mountainous region of Andong, where he was confronted by the 62-year-old homeowner, Nam Ok-soon. Using some string he found inside the house, Ji tied her hands, put a blanket over her and then knocked over a drawer over her to keep her immobilized. After ransacking the home for valuables, he set fire to the blanket and left the house, which was soon engulfed in flames. On June 16, at around 1 AM, he entered a secluded home in Pacheon-myeon, Cheongsong County, where he tied up 67-year-old Kim Oh-sun, robbed her of valuables and then set fire to her house, killing her in the process.

On September 27, at around 8 PM, he entered a secluded house in Andong, but as nobody was present at the time, he stole any valuable item he could find before burning it to the ground. On October 13, he broke into another isolated house in Andong, where he subdued 58-year-old Kim Gwi-nyeon, from whom he stole a pair of gold rings. Afterwards, Ji put a blanket over her body, knocked down a set of drawers, and then lit the house on fire, leaving Kim to burn to death. Six days later, he broke inside a house in Andong, occupied by 71-year-old Park Yulmi-gol and two of her friends, 64-year-old Kim Soo-il and 70-year-old Baek Jae-su, who had been there for a sleepover. After waking up the three grandmothers, Ji threatened them and demanded money, but when all three refused, he bound their hands and feet with their skirt and jeogori straps before putting a blanket over all three. He then went into the kitchen, lit a LPG cylinder and threw it into the bedroom, where it blew up and killed all three women. The resulting explosion cut off water and electricity supply to the region, leading a local resident to investigate the cause, finding the bodies of Park and her companions. Soon after the police were informed, a full-fledged investigation was launched in order to solve the mysterious arson and bombings incidents that had occurred in the area for the past few months.

== Arrest, trial and imprisonment ==
On November 2, at around 9 PM, Ji was skulking around a rural house in Bonghwa County, where an elderly man and four elderly women were living. While the residents were watching TV, he planned to break inside using a pick axe, but when he did, he made too much noise and was noticed by the man, who subsequently called the police. Several hours later, officers arrived in the area and started searching extensively, eventually finding Ji holed up in the corner of a room in an abandoned house. After violently resisting the officers, he was eventually cuffed and dragged away. At this time, he started shouting angrily, claiming that he wanted to take revenge on society due to the imposed stigma of being an ex-convict. He made similar statements in his subsequent interrogation, claiming that he planned to get on the news by killing celebrities and lawmakers, after which he would commit suicide.

At his murder trial, Ji suddenly recanted his confession, claiming that detectives had tortured him by throwing water mixed with chili powder on him. This claim was not regarded seriously, with Ji subsequently being found guilty and sentenced to life imprisonment. However, at a follow-up appeal in 1991, his sentence was changed to the death penalty, with the court ruling that the six murders committed by him were extremely cruel and thusly warranted his permanent isolation from society.

=== Execution ===
On November 2, 1995, only four years after his death sentence was confirmed, Ji was hanged at the Seoul Detention Center. He was one of a dozen violent criminals executed on that day, including the six male members of the Chijon family and rapist-turned-spree killer Oen Bo-hyun.

== See also ==
- Capital punishment in South Korea
- List of serial killers by country

== Bibliography ==
- Pyo Chang-won (June 15, 2006). 한국의 연쇄살인 [Serial murders in Korea] (in Korean). Random House Korea. ISBN 9788959244188.
