= Kim Hae-sun =

South Korean rapist and murderer (born 1969)

- Born: May 6, 1969 (age 57); North Jeolla Province, Gochang County, South Korea
- Conviction: Murder
- Penalty: Death

Details
- Victims: 3
- Span of crimes: October – December 2000
- Country: South Korea

Kim Hae-sun (Korean: 김해선; born May 6, 1969) is a South Korean serial killer and rapist who killed three minors in 2000. He also attempted to rape and kill another high school student, but the attempt was halted.

== Crimes ==
On October 25, 2000, the first victim was found by her best friend. The victim, 11 year old Jung Hye-in, was found dead on a mountain about 300 feet away from the road on which she was last seen alive. A few days later, the autopsy confirmed that she had been strangled. Semen was also found on the victim's body.

On December 19, 2000, Kim, who was drunkenly wandering around, noticed a high school girl who was returning home alone. The girl reportedly had a strange feeling and ran away from the area.

That same day, 2 siblings, a brother in middle school and a sister in high school went missing on their way home. After the two disappeared, the brother, 12-year-old Park Hong-sun, who was in the first grade of middle school, was found dead the next morning about 900 feet away from his house. His body was covered with a shawl, and a yellow item was wrapped around his neck. 15 feet away, a woman's bra and panties, which were cut up with sharp tools, were found.

The sister, 15-year-old Park Eun-mi was found on a mountain 0.3 miles away from her brother's body. Her skirt had been turned upside down over the chest, covering the face, and both hands and legs were strapped to a tree with a string and stockings. The left foot had all the stockings peeled off, and her right foot was buried in the ground, her uniform wide open, and she had gloves in her mouth. In addition, she had been stabbed with a knife in her neck, legs, chest and vagina, with 6 inch and 8 inch cuts on her thighs. Cut off parts were later found in a ditch right in front of Kim Hae-sun's house, parts of which he testified had been eaten.

Fifty-six days after the first murder, the investigation team arrested Kim Hae-sun after the Park siblings were found dead.

== Trial and sentence ==
On July 11, 2000, the Jeonju District Court sentenced Kim Hae-sun to death after he was convicted of rape and murder. Kim immediately appealed to the Supreme Court, but on September 27, 2001, the appeal was dismissed.

== Profiling ==
Professor Pyo Chang-won classified him in his book "Korea's murders" as a "criminal psychopath". He also expressed regret that the police would have been able to prevent the other murders if they had acted quickly enough.

The investigation was hard, as Kim refused to take a blood type test, and he was drunk immediately after the arrest, with the interrogating detective even having to wake him up. Also, to the detectives' surprise, he was able to remember the contents of a talk show he had watched on the day of the murder. According to Kim, he murdered the Parks not because they were children, but because the former crime was not reported to the media.

=== Kim's upbringing ===
He helped his father with farming, but did not know how to work properly due to mental illness and drinking alcohol from time to time. As a child, Kim Hae-sun was habitually hit by his father, being stripped of his clothes and hit with a belt. At one point, he was expelled from the house. Kim also said that he had never visited a public bath due to his wounds. As stress relief, he tortured cats and dogs. He began to have extremely violent tendencies, such as sickening his neighbor's cattle and killing them. At the age of 16, he was sent to a family court for a stolen item. At the age of 24, he was sentenced to one year in prison and two years probation for a violent crime. At the age of 26, he was sentenced to four years in prison and three years probation for raping a female pen pal. At the age of 27, he went to Busan and worked as a restaurant employee at the Yeonang fishing boats, where he learned how to use seamen's knots and was able to work with knives. Then, he gathered money working as a tea house employee in Busan before returning to his hometown in July 2000, three months before the murders.

== See also ==
- Yoo Young-chul
- Kang Ho-sun
- Chijon family
- List of serial killers by country
