= Crime in South Korea =

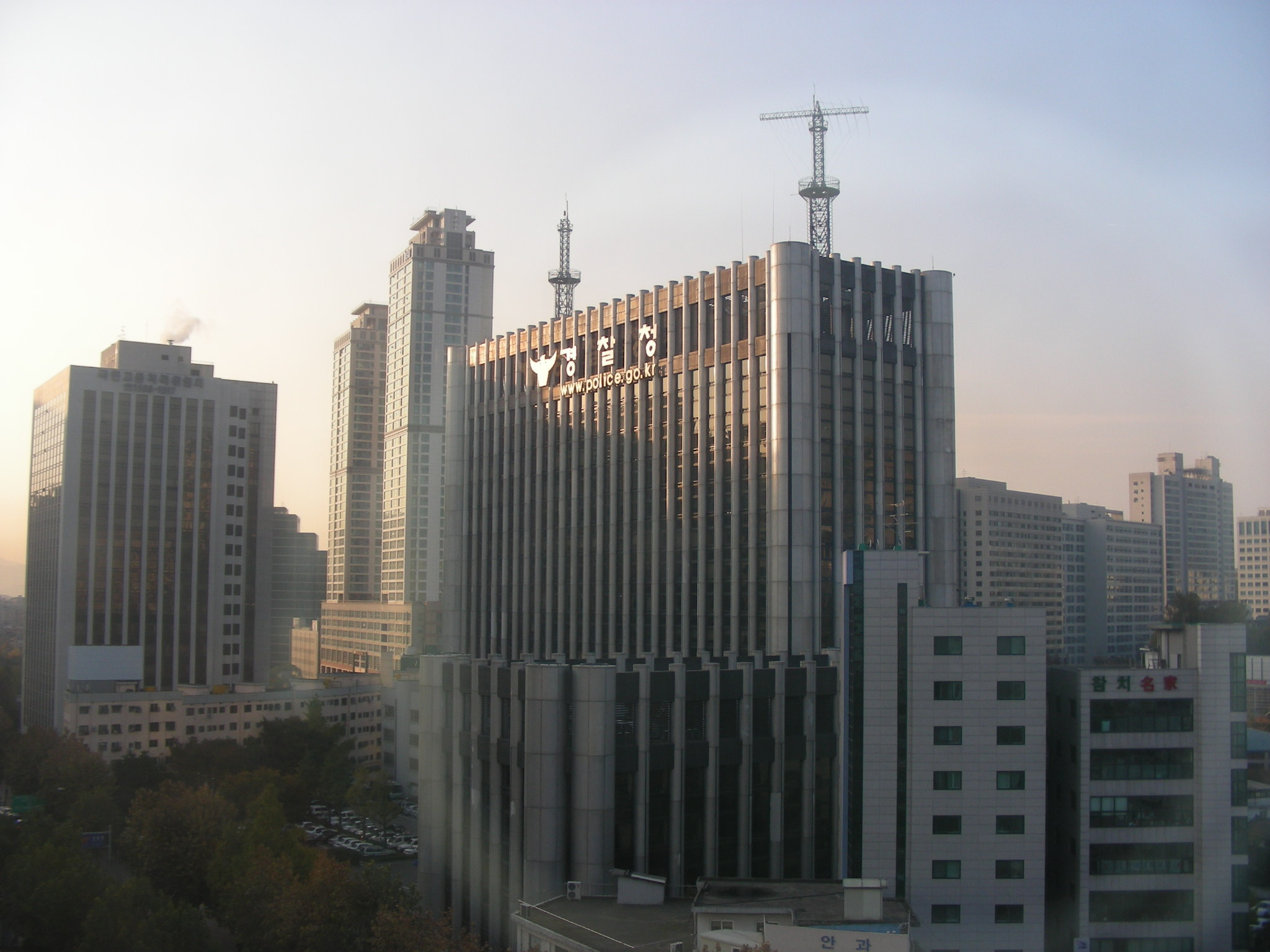
Headquarters of the National Police Agency in South Korea

South Korea has a relatively low crime rate compared to other industrialized countries.

== Overview ==
Although South Korea has a lower crime rate than other industrialized countries, the crime rate in 2007 was around 2.9 times higher than in 1978, with the total number of crimes committed rising from 513,165 to 1,965,577. The Organized Crime Index in 2026, points that South Korea is ranked on 134th place out of 193, with a criminality score of 4.42.

On occasion, sudden changes in circumstance have led to cause short-term fluctuations in the crime rate – for example, the crime rate rose by 15% following the 1997 Asian financial crisis, and dropped by 21% during the first ten days of the 2002 FIFA World Cup.

There is also a problem in the nation with foreign criminals targeting it due to its relatively affluent status and the perception that it has lax security. 1.4 percent of crimes in the nation are committed by foreigners, which is quite low considering the 3.5% of the population is non-Korean. According to politician Chung Woo-taik, in 2023, South Korea sees an annual average 36,000 criminal suspects of foreign nationality.

According to British criminal Colin Blaney in his autobiography 'Undesirables', the country is targeted by English, Canadian, American and German criminals.

== Organized crime ==
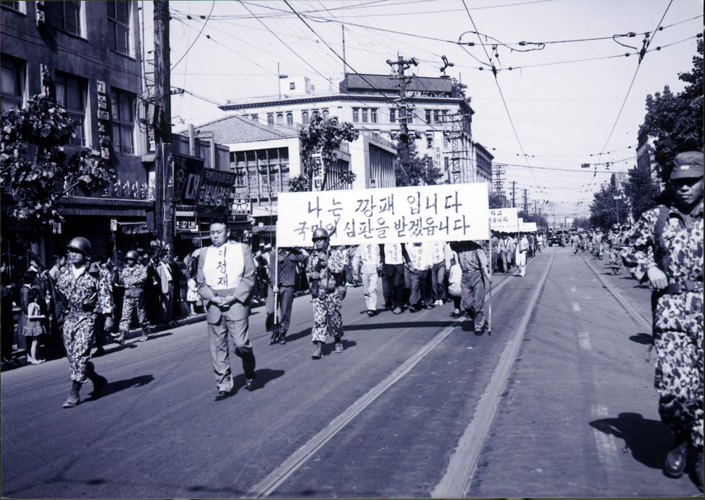
Gang leader Lee Jung-jae being shame-paraded by the Park Chung Hee military regime. He was arrested after Park's May 16 coup and executed in October 1961.

South Korea has undergone dramatic social, economic and political upheaval since the end of the Korean War in 1953. With these changes crime has increased in recent years and has become a major issue in South Korea. Most of the increase has come in the form of violence and illegal activities connected to organized groups.

Due to the large police and military presence after the Korean War, the expansion of home-grown organized crime was slowed, almost giving South Korea immunity against international criminal organizations. With no outside conflicts South Korean organized crime has had an advantage to grow, yet because of the location of the Korean peninsula many outside groups from Russia, Japan and China have started to engage in more illegal activities in South Korea.

Amid the political confusion of the 1950s, a number of organized gangs emerged and became an influential force in the entertainment districts. Soon these groups began associating with politicians, guarding them from danger and disrupting the political rallies of competing politicians by using organized violence. These particular groups were the so-called "political gangs" or "henchmen".

Organized crime after the War started mainly in the city of Seoul, the capital city of South Korea. Two main gangs formed, the first was known as the "Chong-ro Faction" which was made up of members from southern Korea, and the second was known as the "Myung-dong Faction" whose members were from Pyonyando province. These two gangs claimed dominance over northern Seoul. With the military in control, in the years from 1961 to 1963 13,000 members of these gangs were arrested causing organized gangs to almost completely disappear. The 1970s brought an easing of public discipline and control, and opportunities for organized crime emerged again. This saw the emergence of two new groups known as the "Master Sergeant Shin Faction" which was located in the Seoul area and the "Ho-nam Faction" found in the Mugyo-dong area of Seoul. In 1975 there was a violent battle over territories among the two groups which ended with the Shin Faction becoming victorious.

Traditional South Korean criminal groups fights rarely resulted in deaths as they fought with their hands, feet and heads. Knives and metal bars only began to show up as weapons in the 1970s. In today's South Korean society, no person may be in possession of any guns, swords or knives, which may explain why traditional crime groups did not use weapons.

Upon the assassination of President Park in 1979 "special measures to uproot social evils" were initiated under the proclaimed martial law which led to a decline in organized criminal violence. But with the relaxed atmosphere these criminal organizations remerged and flourished yet again (Lee, 2006). With the 1985 Asian Games and the 1988 Seoul Summer Olympics global expansion became a possibility and criminal groups took advantage of this opportunity for rapid economic development. Taking advantage of the Korean government's open-door and globalization policies, these crime groups began to form coalitions with their counterparts in Japan, China, Hong Kong, and the United States.

In 1990 the Korean Government declared a "war on crime" in an effort to crack down on violent and non-violent acts by criminally organized groups. The raids in the fall of 1990 crippled most of the existing criminal groups, but did not destroy them. As one way of better controlling the number of criminal groups, the Korean Government made it illegal to form or join any criminal organization. Statistics from the Supreme Prosecutor's Office showed that in 1999 there were 11,500 members from 404 organized crimes groups ranging from 10 to 88 members in South Korea.

With the trend of economic growth and globalization, organized crime groups in South Korea have become larger in scale and broader in their fields of operations. These international linkages have started to include drug trafficking, financial fraud, weapons smuggling, and human trafficking. Organized transnational crime has become a major concern facing not only Korean government, but also the international community.

== Drugs ==
The use of drugs in South Korea is a lesser offence; however, there are still drug related offences in South Korea. Most of the drug related offences occur in the Gangnam and Yongsan Districts. In 2013, there were 129 drug related crimes reported in the Gangnam area and 48 drug related crimes reported in the Yongsan area.

A Gangnam District representative said, "drugs are usually distributed through the club network, in Gangnam, foreign students and club operators tend to be involved in the drug trade, a relatively easy way to make money."

According to the Supreme Prosecutors' Office, there were 7,011 arrests for drug offences in 2011 which was a 7 percent drop from the previous year. The U.S., by way of comparison, in 2010 made more than 1.6 million drug arrests, more than 36 times Korea's figure, even after differences in population are accounted for. The drug that is most common is Crystalline Methamphetamine also known as Crystal Meth.

Crystal Meth remains the most commonly used drug, accounting for most drug related arrests. Other drugs that are well known are club drugs such as ecstasy. These continue to grow in popularity among college students. However, methamphetamine continues to be the drug of choice for Koreans.

== Murder ==
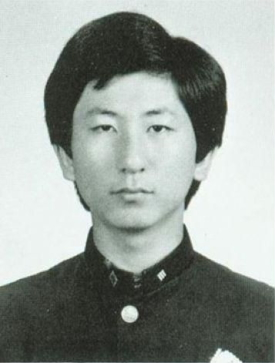
South Korean serial killer Lee Choon-jae

In South Korea, murder is uncommon. Gangseo District and Yeongdeungpo Districts are the two most well-known areas where murders happen most often. In 2013, there were 21 murder cases in the Gangseo District and 11 murder cases in the Yeongdeungpo District. These two districts are found on the southwest part of the capital, Seoul, which house many low income citizens and foreign workers.

A Dongguk University Police Administration professor, Kwak Dae-gyung said, "there are many foreign residents that have yet to adapt to Korean society and citizens lower in the economic strata in these areas, there's trouble in terms of economic competition and a lengthy period of cultural assimilation that leads to people committing violent crimes out of frustration and the need for frequent police action."

Between 1986 and 1994, Lee Choon-jae murdered fifteen women and girls in addition to committing numerous sexual assaults, predominantly in Hwaseong, Gyeonggi Province, and the surrounding areas. The murders, which remained unsolved for thirty years, are considered to be the most infamous in modern South Korean history and were the inspiration for the 2003 film Memories of Murder.

== Rape ==
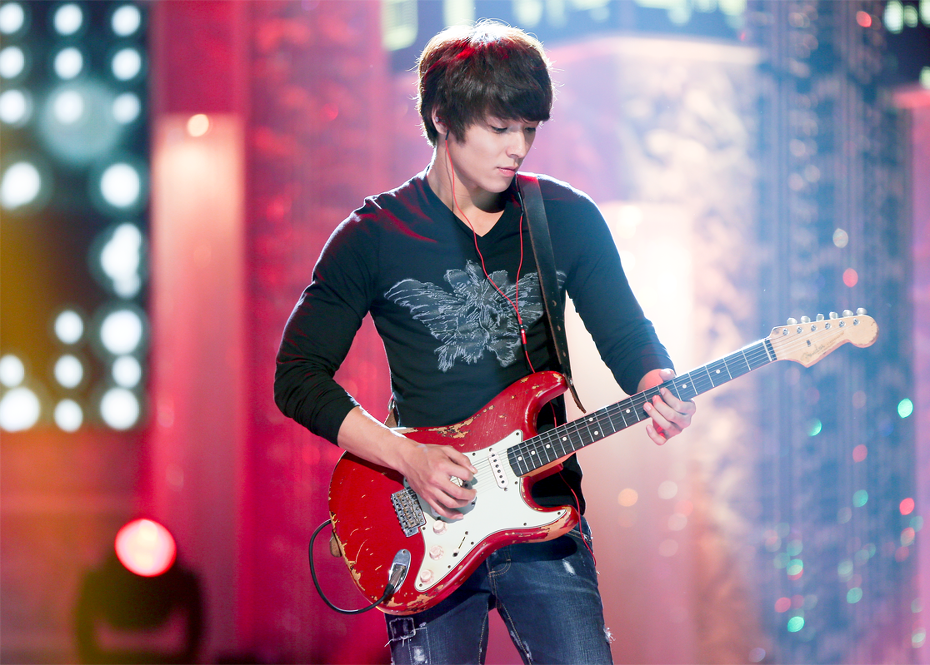
Korean pop idol Choi Jong-hoon was sentenced to 5 years in prison for gang-raping multiple women together with Jung Joon-young

In South Korea, the crime of rape (Korean Criminal Law Article 297) is defined by whether the perpetrator used "violence or duress" to compel sexual intercourse. The use of violence or intimidation is the basis for the legal definition, rather than merely the absence of consent. In 2013, the Supreme Court ruled that spousal rape is a crime, overturning the long-standing view that a wife implicitly consents to sex in marriage. In 2018, the Korean Women's Hotline reported that only about 10% of rape complaints it received qualified as rape under the law.

In 2012, there were 77,000 reported cases of sexual assault. In 2011, 22,034 rapes were reported. These statistics are not considered an accurate representation of the true cases; a 2010 survey by the Ministry of Gender Equality and Family concluded that only about 10% of all sexual assault cases were reported. A study in 1997 found that 45.5% of female high school students reported sexual harassment, mostly by their male friends.

The Miryang gang rape was a series of gang rapes that occurred in Miryang, South Korea in 2004. As many as 120 male high school students gang raped female high-schoolers over the course of 11 months. The case caused a public outcry due to police mistreatment of the victims and the offenders' light punishments.

== Corruption ==
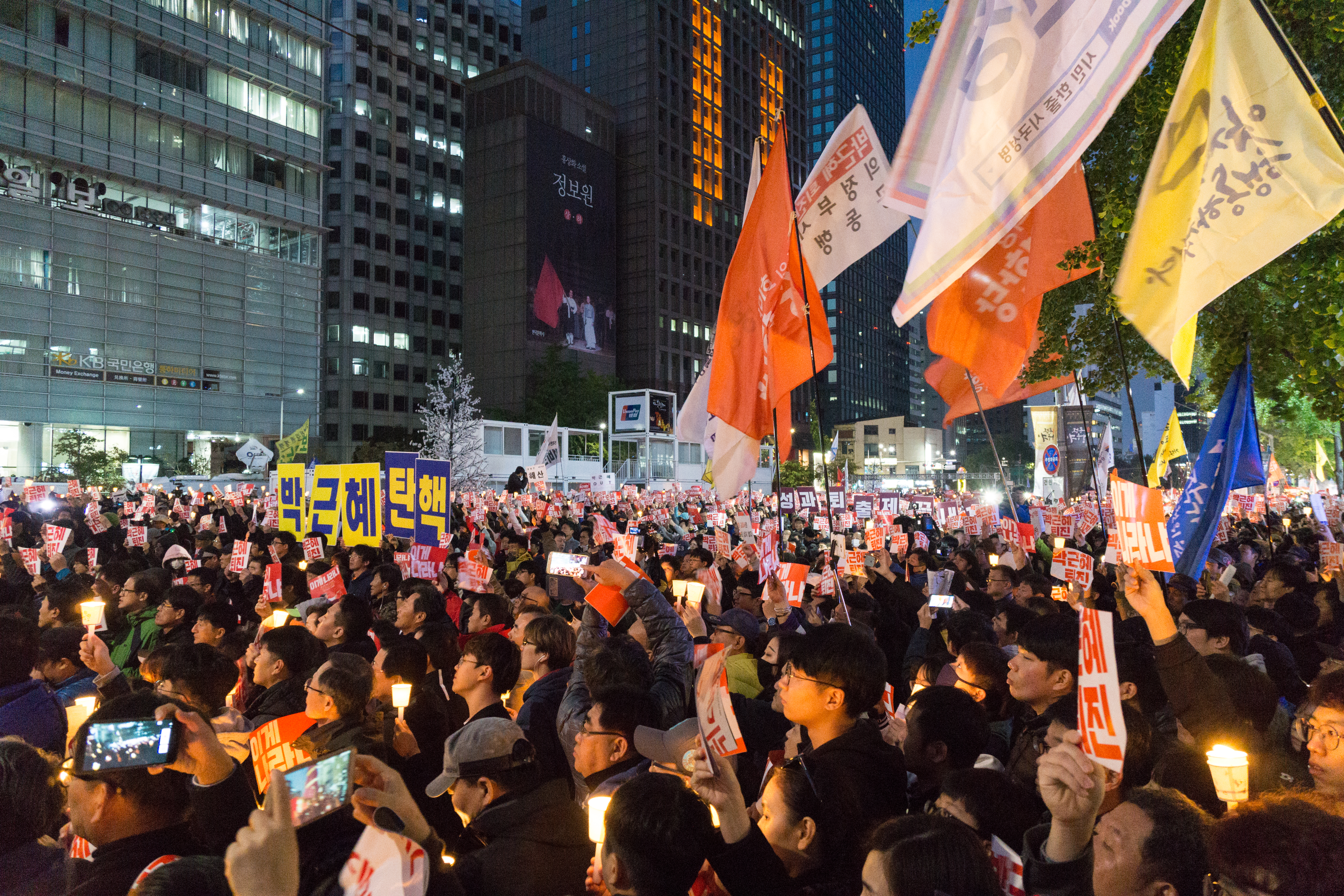
The impeachment of Park Geun-hye in 2017 followed months of massive public protests across South Korea against a widespread corruption and cronyism scandal involving the President and her close confidante, Choi Soon-sil.

South Korea dropped one notch in an international corruption awareness ranking to 46th place among 177 nations in 2013. According to the 2014 Corruption Perceptions Index (CPI) issued by Transparency International (TI), South Korea scored 55 out of 100. Corruption Perceptions Index . The index shows qualitative assessments of a country's level of corruption in the administrative and public sectors giving a yearly view of the relative degree of corruption by ranking countries from all over the globe. It uses data taken from opinion surveys of experts from each country. The reputation of the country's law enforcement agency has recently been tarnished after a number of ranking government officials, including the head of the state intelligence agency, were indicted for alleged bribery.

Some 86.5 percent of respondents in a Korea Institute of Public Administration survey of small and large companies described corruption among high-ranking public officials as "serious" in 2010, the highest result since the poll began in 2000. Transparency International, a corruption watchdog, gave South Korea a rating of 5.4 in its 2010 corruption perceptions index — midway between highly corrupt and very clean. That ranks South Korea alongside countries and territories such as Botswana, Puerto Rico and Poland but far below many of the developed nations it has sought to emulate.

Founder and leader of a messianic Christian church Shincheonji, Lee Man-hee, was convicted of embezzling 5.6 billion won, or $5.1 million, from church funds to build a luxurious “peace palace” north of Seoul.

The conservative People Power Party (PPP) and the liberal Democratic Party (DPK) are embroiled in a political scandal involving allegations of receiving illegal political funds and donations from the Unification Church (formally the Family Federation for World Peace and Unification). Hak Ja Han, the leader of the Unification Church (whose members are called Unificationists or sometimes informally Moonies), was arrested in South Korea in September 2025 on various corruption charges, including bribery and embezzlement. Also indicted in 2025 were Jeong Won-ju, who served as Han's chief of staff, and former World Headquarters Director-General Yun Young-ho.

== Prostitution ==
Prostitution in South Korea is illegal, but according to The Korea Women's Development Institute 여성부, the sex trade in the country was estimated to amount to 14 trillion South Korean won ($13 billion) in 2007. In 2003, the Korean Institute of Criminology announced that 260,000 women, or 1 of 25 of young Korean women, may be engaged in the sex industry. However, the Korean Feminist Association alleged that from 514,000 to 1.2 million Korean women participate in the prostitution industry. In addition, a similar report by the Institute noted that 20% of men in their 20s pay for sex at least four times a month, with 358,000 visiting prostitutes daily.

The sex trade involved some 94 million transactions in 2007, down from 170 million in 2002. The number of prostitutes dropped by 18 percent to 269,000 during the same period. The amount of money traded for prostitution was over 14 trillion won, compared to than 24 trillion won in 2002. Despite legal sanctions and police crackdowns, prostitution continues to flourish in the country, while sex workers continue to actively resist the state's activities.

The Burning Sun scandal revealed a high-profile case of molka circulation, where celebrities such as Jung Joonyoung were found to have filmed or shared explicit sexual videos in a private chat room, many of which were filmed in motel rooms and involved with prostitution rings. In March 2019, developments in the Burning Sun scandal led to the public reveal of Jung Joon-young KakaoTalk chatrooms.

== Sex trafficking ==
South Korean and foreign women and girls have been victims of sex trafficking in South Korea. They are raped and physically and psychologically harmed in brothels, businesses, homes, hotels, and other locations throughout the country.

== Cybercrime ==
Cybercrime in South Korea has undergone a radical transformation in the recent years, evolving from simple hacking and identity theft into highly sophisticated, AI-generated exploitation.

In 2024 and 2025, the country saw a surge in digital sex crimes, particularly those involving deepfake technology targeting minors and students. Traditional financial fraud has been replaced by voice phishing and complex cryptocurrency Pig Butchering scams.

North Korea also targets South Korean citizens for financial gains, to bypass international sanctions and fund the regime's weapons programs. North Korean-linked organizations, such as Lazarus Group and Kimsuky, are known for their use of social engineering and AI-generated deepfakes to scam individuals and infiltrate financial platforms.

To combat this, the South Korean government has significantly increased the budget for the National Police Agency (NPA) cyber response units and introduced stricter legislation targeting the distribution and possession of AI-generated material.

== See also ==
- Outline of South Korea
- Chijon Family
- Frog Boys
- Hwaseong serial murders
- Kang Ho-sun
- Kkangpae
- Yoo Young-chul
- Woo Bum-kon
