= Jeong Nam-gyu =

South Korean rapist and murderer

- Born: April 17, 1969; Jangsu County, South Korea
- Died: November 22, 2009 (aged 40); Seoul Detention Center, South Korea
- Conviction: Murder
- Penalty: Death

Details
- Victims: 14
- Span of crimes: 2004–2006
- Country: South Korea

Jeong Nam-gyu (Korean: 정남규; April 17, 1969 – November 22, 2009) was a South Korean serial killer, who from 2004 to 2006 killed 14 people.

== Crimes ==
On January 14, 2004, in Bucheon, Gyeonggi Province, he kidnapped, raped and then murdered two people. He then continued to murder people in Gyeonggi and Seoul, including the murder of a woman returning home late at night. He murdered mainly in the southern part of Seoul, including Shin-gil, Guro and Gwanak. His reason for killing a male elementary school student after sexually assaulting him was that he himself was abused by a man as a child.

On April 26, 2006, he was arrested at the end of a fight in which he tried to kill a man and the man's father. Subsequent investigations revealed that he also murdered a man at Imun-dong. Before Jeong confessed this murder, serial killer Yoo Young-Chul falsely confessed that he also had committed it. On April 12, 2007, he was sentenced to death by the Supreme Court and detained in Seoul Detention Center.

== Suicide ==
On the morning of November 21, 2009, a jail employee discovered Jeong had attempted to hang himself from a noose made from a plastic bag. He was rushed to the hospital, but died the following morning. His crimes were also depicted in 2022 South Korean drama Through the Darkness.

== List of crimes ==
- January 14, 2004: Yoon Ki-hyun, 13, and Im Young-gyu, 12, were kidnapped, raped, and then strangled to death.
- January 30, 2004: Won Kyung-ja, 44, was stabbed but survived.
- February 6, 2004: Jeon Hyo-sil, 24, was stabbed to death. Yoo Young-chul falsely confessed to this murder.
- February 10, 2004: Son Young-ran, 28, was stabbed to death.
- February 13, 2004: Seo Eun-jung, 30, was stabbed but survived.
- February 25, 2004: Hong Son-young, 29, was stabbed but survived.
- February 26, 2004: Park Bok-soon, 17, was stabbed but survived.
- April 8, 2004: Jeong Yong-soo, 25, was stabbed to death.
- April 22, 2004: Kim Young-hee, 20, was stabbed to death.
- May 5, 2004: Choi Joo-myung, 22, was stabbed but survived.
- May 9, 2004: Kim Hyun-jin, 24, was stabbed to death.
- August 4, 2004: Ahn Sung-chul, 50, was bludgeoned with a blunt weapon after Jeong broke into his house. He survived.
- April 6, 2005: Kang Ye-eun, 71, and Han Li-na, 13, were bludgeoned with a blunt weapon after Jeong broke into the house they were staying at. He then set the residence on fire. Both victims survived.
- April 18, 2005: Hwang Hye-soo, 46, and his daughter Min-chul, 12, were bludgeoned with a blunt weapon after Jeong broke into their house. Both victims survived.
- May 30, 2005: Kim Young-soon, 41, was stabbed to death.
- June 4, 2005: Kim Joo-hee, 36, was bludgeoned with a blunt object after Jeong broke into her house. She survived.
- October 9, 2005: Hong Hye-jin, 39, was bludgeoned with a blunt weapon after Jeong broke into a residential facility for the disabled where she had been staying. He also bludgeoned another person there. Both victims survived.
- October 19, 2005: Byun Yu-jung, 26, was molested and then strangled to death after Jeong broke into her house. He then set her 23-year-old brother and the residence on fire. The brother survived.
- January 14, 2006: Jeong broke into a house and sexually assaulted a 7-year-old girl. He was scared off by her father.
- January 18, 2006: Jeong broke into a house and bludgeoned Song Jin-hee, 17, with a blunt object before he strangled her to death. He then did the same thing to her siblings, Min-young, 21, followed by Seok-gu, 12.
- March 27, 2006: Kim Jin-young, 25, and her sisters, Young-suk, 21, and Eun-hee, 13, were attacked after Jeong broke into their home. Only Eun-hee survived.
- April 22, 2006: Kim Yong-soo, 24, was bludgeoned with a blunt weapon after Jeong broke into his house. He survived.

== See also ==
- List of serial killers by country
- List of serial killers by number of victims

== See also ==
- Yoo Young-chul
- Kang Ho-sun
- Chijon family
