= Jeong Du-yeong =

South Korean serial killer (born 1968)

- Born: December 31, 1968 (age 57); Busan, South Korea
- Status: Incarcerated on death row
- Conviction: Murder (9 counts)
- Penalty: Death

Details
- Victims: 9
- Span of crimes: 1986–2000
- Country: South Korea
- Imprisoned at: Daejeon Prison

Jeong Du-yeong (Korean: 정두영; Hanja: 鄭斗英 born December 31, 1968) is a South Korean serial killer who killed 8 people from June 1999 to April 2000 after serving 11 years in prison for the 1986 murder of a police officer.

In 1986, when Jeong was 18 years old, he committed his first murder and was imprisoned for it. After his release, he was again arrested for theft and sentenced to six months in prison. In the following 10 months, he committed 16 robberies, killing 8 people in Busan, Ulsan, Gyeongnam and Chungham. Jeong's death penalty has been stayed, and he is likely to be imprisoned for life.

== Life ==
Jeong Du-yeong was born in 1968 as the youngest child with three brothers and one sister. His father died when he was two and his mother remarried, leaving Jeong to be cared for by his uncle. He had a serious complex due to his appearance, and said that the reason for the 1986 murder was simply because he thought the officer ignored him. Jeong, who spent most of his childhood in an orphanage, stated in his post-arrest statement that he wanted to have an ordinary family. Until then, money was not collected by theft and robbery, but by a bankbook, reaching a total amount of 130 million won. He said that he had planned to arrange marriages to a total of one billion people, and that he was going to build an apartment and PC room.

== Crime ==
Jeong committed his first murder in 1986. Only 18 years old without criminal record at the time, he was given a mild sentence of 11 years in prison for killing 43-year-old officer Kim Chan-il. South Korea had active death penalty for murder, till 1997. After his release, he got involved in several petty thefts for which he spent times in prison. His killing spree began in June 1999 up to April 2000, until his arrest. During that period he killed eight people in several locations in Busan, Ulsan, Gyeongnam and Chungham. Some of his recorded murder activities are:

- On June 2, 1999, Lee Young-ja, a housekeeper who lived alone in a wealthy residential area in Busan, died after having parts of her face brutally pierced. At the time, the fact that the victim's house was next door to the inspection office of the Busan High Public Prosecutors' Office was a topic of discussion, but it turned out to be a coincidence.
- On September 15, 1999, while stealing money from the high-end villas of Seo-gu in Busan, Jeong killed the housemaid.
- On October 21, 1999, a 53-year-old mother and her 24-year-old son were killed in a luxury housing complex in Ulsan. In this case, the police paid attention to the 'overdrive' which was not seen in the other robberies, but no connection was established to the previous events in Busan.
- On March 11, 2000, a couple of women were attacked in a high-end residence in Seo-gu by a man with a baseball bat. One of the women said that she had a baby, and the killer let her live. Based on the survivor's statement, the police described the attacker as tall and in his 20s or 30s, sending this to the national police.
- On April 8, 2000, in Dongbu-ku, Busan, Jeong killed 76-year-old Chung Jin-tae and his housekeeper with a knife, also hitting Chung's grandmother. He stole a check worth 24.3 million won. While the grandmother was passing the emergency service in the hospital, she came by a police officer dispatched to the hospital and then saw Jeong Du-yeong, who was caught in Cheonan, pointing out that he was responsible for the murders. Jeong subsequently confessed to his crimes.

Jeong's targets were generally rich people, mostly women, and usually chose rainy Thursdays to kill, which earned him the nickname the "rainy Thursday killer."

== Conviction ==
=== First trial ===
On July 21, 2000, the Busan District Court sentenced Jeong Du-yeong, who was charged with robbery and homicide, to death, and also sentenced his brother-in-law, Kim Jong-young, to one year and six months imprisonment. The defendants objected and submitted an appeal to the Busan District Court.

=== Second trial ===
On November 30, 2000, the Busan Appellate Court dismissed all the appeals and maintained Jeong's death sentence and Kim's one year and six months sentence. Jeong abandoned his appeals towards the Supreme Court, confirming his death penalty. He is now serving his sentence in Daejeon prison.

=== Imprisonment ===
Jeong's death penalty has never been implemented. Although still legalised, South Korea had not practiced execution since 1997, so that Jeong is likely to serve his life in a death row.

On September 28, 2016, while imprisoned in Daejeon Prison, he was caught trying to escape using a ladder that he had secretly built while working in the workshop. He escaped over two of three prison walls, but failed to cross the last wall.

== Influences ==
=== Criminal profiling ===
Before the case of Jeong, South Korea had no criminal profiling system. In 1998, Kim Yeon-ah and Kwon Il-yong established the Forensic Identification Research Society. Through this non-governmental organisation, the need for criminal profiling was urged to the National Police Agency (NPA). The necessity was realised following Jeong's case, and the NPA designated Kwon as the first South Korean criminal profiler in 2000.

=== The raincoat killer ===
In 2004, Yoo Young-chul was convicted of 20 murders. The prosecutors revealed that many of Yoo's activities were inspired by that of Jeong. Yoo is recognised as the most prolific serial killer in South Korea. Copying Jeong's chosen times, Yoo mostly killed on rainy days wearing raincoats, for which he is nicknamed the "raincoat killer."

== See also ==
- Jung Yoo-jung, another convicted killer in Busan
- Kang Ho-sun
- List of serial killers by country
