= Shim Young-gu =

South Korean serial killer (1961–1992)

- Born: 1961; Jecheon, North Chungcheong Province, South Korea
- Died: 29 December 1992 (aged 30–31); Seoul Detention Center, Uiwang, South Korea
- Cause of death: Execution by hanging
- Conviction: Murder (x8)
- Penalty: Death

Details
- Victims: 8
- Span of crimes: June – December 1989
- Country: South Korea
- States: Gyeonggi, Seoul
- Date apprehended: 22 January 1990

Shim Young-gu (Korean: 심영구; 1961 – 29 December 1992) was a South Korean serial killer who stabbed eleven people during robberies in Gyeonggi Province and Seoul from May to December 1989, killing eight and wounding three. Convicted and sentenced to death for his crimes, he was subsequently executed in 1992.

== Early life ==
Shim Young-gu was born in Jecheon in 1961. From an early age, he was forced to watch as his father physically abused his mother, who eventually ran away with his little sister when Shim was still eight years old. After this incident, he was left to live with his father, who remarried to another woman with children of her own, but even in this new environment, he did not feel loved by anyone in the household.

Eventually, Shim dropped out of middle school and adopted a transient lifestyle, living day-to-day by selling newspapers, polishing shoes and working low-skilled, labor-intensive jobs. At the age of 26, he was imprisoned for robbery and sentenced to 3 years and 6 months imprisonment, serving his sentence until the summer of 1988. Upon his release, Shim reunited with his biological mother and moved in with her, but was dissatisfied with his life due to their meager living conditions, as his mother lived off of her wage from working at a doll factory. As a result, he resorted to violent robberies, viciously attacking various locations around the country using a climbing knife. Over time, Shim grew addicted to the violence he caused, and resorted to killing his victims.

== Murders ==
On 21 May 1989, at around 1:20 AM, Shim entered a hair salon in Seongnam's Sujeong-gu district, where he awakened the sleeping proprietor, 23-year-old Lee. Startled by the intruder, Lee began to scream, causing Shim to draw his knife and stab him, before stealing 7,000 won from the cash register and fleeing. Lee was later found by a neighbor who rushed him to a nearby hospital, and despite the seriousness of his injuries, he survived the ordeal. Twenty days later, Shim was out drinking alcohol in a dark alley when he randomly encountered 42-year-old Mrs. Shin, the owner of a local pub. The two were acquainted with one another, as Shin considered him a delinquent who caused trouble whenever he was around, and due to this, she began to scold him for his constant drinking. Angered, Shim pulled out his knife and threatened her, prompting her to attempt to flee, but he caught up to her and stabbed her to death. Shin's body was found in a crevice near an elementary school on the following morning.

After this killing, Shim moved to Seoul, where he continued with his crimes. Five days later, on 16 June, he stalked a 42-year-old woman surnamed Kim while she was returning home from work in the Gwanak District, eventually taking out his knife and stabbing her in the back. Once she fell down, he began to repeatedly stab her in the back and then the chest, eventually killing her. The woman's disfigured body was found on the following morning, with the investigating authorities summarizing that the motive was likely robbery, as the killer had stolen 100,000 won from her purse. However, as there were no witnesses and no links had been made to the previous attacks to Seongam, the leads on the case quickly dried up.

On the early morning of 4 August, a woman's screams were heard from an alley in Jungwon-gu, Seongnam, causing the alerted residents to call the police. Upon arriving at the scene, police found the body of 43-year-old Mrs. Park, who had been stabbed in the back and shoulder six times and evidently perished as a result of bleeding. The murder was acted out in a brutal manner, as blood had been splattered all over her corpse and the nearby walls. On 16 November, Shim was stalking 53-year-old Kim Min-seok, who was returning to her home in Sujeong-gu from doing an early morning prayer. Noticing that she was carrying a black bag on her, Shim jumped from the alleyway and stabbed Kim to death, but upon inspecting the bag, he only found five copies of the Bible inside.

Following this killing and the break-in of car committed hours afterwards, rumors began to spread around the area that a serial murderer was wandering around Seongam. This eventually reached the local police department, whose detectives surmized that since all of the crimes took place in the early morning hours in a small area, they were likely committed by the same perpetrator. Additionally, they believed that all of the victims had been chosen at random, as they shared no commonalities between one another and had had their money stolen afterwards. However, as the killings usually took place in dark alleyways with no witnesses and the killer leaving no useful clues behind, authorities initially focused on the victims' family members and previously convicted offenders who lived in Seongam.

The next killing took place on 26 November in Guri, when a 57-year-old woman surnamed Lee was stabbed to death while returning home from work. While this case shared similarities with the previous victims, there were no clues pointing towards the identity of the perpetrator. About a month later, on 23 December 54-year-old street vendor Jang was stabbed to death on a street in Seoul's Jongno District, with his killer stealing 170,000 won and 240 bus tickets. The final attack took place on Christmas in Sujeong-gu, Seongnam, when Shim broke into a local supermarket and attacked the 37-year-old clerk Jo Young-seon. Hearing his mother screaming, the woman's 11-year-old son woke up and attempted to help his mother, forcing their attacker to stab both of them to death before fleeing the crime scene.

== Arrest, trial and execution ==
Unbeknownst to Shim, he left behind a slipper that was later found by the investigators, who determined that it did not belong to either of the final victims. After interviewing several locals, they concluded that the slipper belonged to Shim, and upon investigating his movements over the past few months, authorities were shocked to realize that they matched perfectly to each of the attacks. After obtaining a warrant to search his girlfriend's apartment, where he lived at the time, they found 21 pieces of evidence that linked him to the killings, including handbags, the victims' belongings and even the stolen bus tickets. Eventually, after a month-long investigation, Shim was arrested at a rented apartment in Seoul's Gangseo District on 22 January 1990.

Despite the high number of victims and the brutality of the killings, the case was reported only by regional newspapers and quickly forgotten, with some speculating that the authorities had intentionally hushed up the crimes to avoid public scrutiny. Regardless of the reason, Shim was put on trial, convicted on all counts and subsequently sentenced to death, culminating in his eventual hanging at the Seoul Detention Center on 29 December 1992. On the aforementioned date, he was among eight other violent criminals to be executed on that day.

== See also ==
- Capital punishment in South Korea
- List of serial killers by country

== Bibliography ==
- Pyo Chang-won (15 June 2006). 한국의 연쇄살인 [Serial murders in Korea] (in Korean). Random House Korea. ISBN 9788959244188.
