= Kwon Jae-chan =

South Korean serial killer

- 권재찬
- Born: 2 April 1969 (age 57); Incheon, South Korea
- Other name: Incheon serial killer
- Motive: Robbery
- Convictions: Murder (3 counts); Sexual assault; Robbery (4 counts); Abandonment of a corpse (2 counts)
- Penalty: 15 year imprisonment (2003); Death; commuted to life imprisonment (2023)

Details
- Victims: 3
- Span of crimes: 1985–2021
- Country: South Korea
- Date apprehended: 7 December 2021

Korean name
- Hangul: 권재찬
- RR: Gwon Jaechan
- MR: Kwŏn Chaech'an

Kwon Jae-chan (Korean: 권재찬; born 2 April 1969) is a South Korean serial killer who robbed and murdered three people between 2003 and 2021 in the Michuhol District of Incheon, South Korea. He was arrested shortly after his last two murders and sentenced to death.

== Early life ==
In 1969, Kwon Jae-chan, the second oldest of three children, was born in Incheon. In school, Kwon received low grades in every subject, and he was frequently bullied. When he reached secondary school, Kwon repeatedly ran away from home. In December 1985, Kwon was sentenced to juvenile detention for trespassing and theft. Shortly after he was released, Kwon dropped out of school and briefly worked as a hairdresser. On March 30, 1987, he was sentenced to eight months in prison and two years of probation for theft.

In November 1991, Kwon entered an unlocked house in Michuhol-gu, Incheon. Once inside, he raped a woman and attempted to rob her. He was then sentenced to six years in prison for sexual assault, robbery, and attempted blackmail. After he was released from prison in October 1997, Kwon entered another unlocked home where he assaulted a woman and stole 2.6 million won from her. For this crime, he was sentenced to five years in prison.

== Murders ==
In January 2003, Kwon bludgeoned a 69-year-old pawnshop owner to death in Michuhol-gu, Incheon. He then stole 320,000 won from the pawnshop, but was caught after attempting it into Japan. For the murder, he was sentenced to 15 years in prison. While imprisoned, he assaulted a fellow inmate. He was also diagnosed with Raynaud syndrome and several mental illnesses, including depression.

After being released from prison in 2018, Kwon worked at a construction site, but he soon became involved with gambling and owed 90 million in debts. Because of this, Kwon planned to rob and murder another person to pay off his debt. At about 7 a.m. on December 4, 2021, Kwon assaulted a 59-year-old woman in the parking garage of a building in Michuhol-gu, Incheon. He then strangled the woman to death and hid her body in the trunk of a car. Kwon and an accomplice used the victim's credit card to withdraw 4.5 million won from an ATM. They also stole an additional 11 million won in jewelry. The following day, Kwon bludgeoned his accomplice – a middle-aged man – to death on a hill near Eulwangri Beach on Incheon's Yeongjong Island, and buried him nearby.

== Arrest ==
On December 7, 2021, Kwon Jae-chan was arrested and charged with two counts of murder, abandonment of a corpse, and robbery. On 22 June 2022, Kwon was sentenced to death.

== See also ==
- Capital punishment in South Korea
- Crime in South Korea
- List of serial killers by country
- List of serial killers active in the 2020s
