= Kang Chang-gu =

South Korean serial killer (1957–1990)

- Born: 1957; Anseong, Gyeonggi Province, South Korea
- Died: April 17, 1990 (aged 32–33); Seoul Detention Center, Uiwang, South Korea
- Cause of death: Execution by hanging
- Conviction: Murder x6
- Penalty: Death

Details
- Victims: 6
- Span of crimes: 1983–1987
- Country: South Korea
- State: South Chungcheong
- Date apprehended: April 8, 1987

Kang Chang-gu (Korean: 강창구; 1957 – April 17, 1990) was a South Korean serial killer and rapist responsible for the murders of six women in Gongju and the surrounding area from 1983 to 1987, committed out of his self-described misogynistic beliefs. Convicted and sentenced to death for these crimes, he was subsequently hanged in 1990.

== Early life ==
Kang Chang-gu was born in 1957 in Anseong, Gyeonggi Province as the youngest of three brothers and one sister, but the family moved to Gongju when he was just two. He lost both of his parents at an early age and had to be looked after by his older brother, rendering his early life difficult. Kang, who had strabismus, limped in one leg due to polio and began suffering from epileptic fits when he was a teenager, was often shunned and bullied by his peers due to his appearance. The fact that girls and later women avoided him with open disgust caused Kang to harbor feelings of resentment towards people of the opposite sex, eventually culminating in a perverse desire to release his anger by sexually violating and abusing women who had nothing to do with him. He eventually dropped out of school, and shifted jobs as a carpenter and hairdresser to earn his money. Before the murders, he served two years and six months in prison for offences such as theft, assault, rape and obstruction of justice.

== Murders ==
On July 31, 1983, Kang was mowing a field in a valley near the rural village of Useong-myeon when he came across a 50-year-old housewife Hong, who was washing her neck using a red scarf and water from a little pond. Kang approached the woman from behind and held her head underwater until she fainted, whereupon he proceeded to rape her. In order to cover up his crime, he then pushed the unconscious woman into the pond, leaving her to drown. Hong's naked body was found a few days later; however, as it was not unusual for people to suffer heatstrokes out in the countryside at the time, her death was ruled an accident and quickly forgotten about.

On February 21, 1984, 51-year-old Lee left her home in Naeheung-ri to attend a Buddhist memorial service, but failed to return home later that day. Her body was found approximately two months later on a mountain road, but an autopsy failed to locate any external trauma that would indicate that she had been murdered. On August 19, 21-year-old Park Jeong-soon (Note: Pseudonym used by the press) was walking by a mountain road near Useong-myeon during broad daylight, when a man appeared from the forest and threatened her with a sickle. Frightened, she was ordered to follow him to an isolated spot in the bushes, whereupon the man forced himself upon her. The assailant, Kang, slashed Park violently, but was unable to kill her due to her fierce resistance, which allowed her to eventually escape. This attack was soon linked to the suspicious death of Lee months prior, creating an aura of fear for local women.

After the failed attempt on Park's life, Kang is not known to have committed any attacks until August 1985, when he raped and killed a 21-year-old tourist, Lee, who was visiting the area to attend a Buddhist service. The body was found a few days later, but authorities were unable to establish the decedent's identity for some time due to the severe decomposition of her body. On January 29, 1987, 47-year-old housewife Kim Jong-hee left her residence in Useong-myeon to visit a local hermitage, but after she failed to return, authorities were dispatched to search the hermitage and the surrounding hills, to no avail.

On February 28, 57-year-old Seo Jeong-sun left her home to go to the church on the outskirts of Useong-myeon, with a witness claiming that they had seen her alive waiting at a bus stop at around 8 PM. She never returned, and three days later, her body, covered with rice straw, was found on a rural road. There were strangulation marks on her neck, and her socks and panties had been removed, indicating that she had been raped. Following her murder, authorities started reinvestigating all previous disappearance and suspicious deaths, believing them to be related. This suspicion was soon confirmed after 47-year-old Lee Juk-ja, who ran a food cart in Useong-myeon, disappeared on April 1. Her disappearance forced the police to undertake a search operation, leading to the locations of Kim and Lee Juk-ja's bodies over the next few days.

== Investigation and arrest ==
After the discovery of the two women's bodies, a task force of as many of 60 homicide detectives was formed to resolve the cases. From their investigation, it was deduced that all six victims were women travelling alone, raped before murder and their bodies dumped in sparsely populated hills or valleys. And since the crimes happened during the times of the day where few people were around, the perpetrator was likely familiar with the area and was motivated by his sexual desires. Because of this, several ex-convicts who fit the profile were interrogated, but nothing came out of it. One interesting tip came when a local monk claimed that he often saw a suspicious man, around 1.65 cm and in his 30s, often riding on the buses usually used by Buddhist pilgrims, but the man had never been at any services.

Shortly thereafter, the investigators were tipped off about the 1985 sexual assault of a woman in Gongju, leading them to believe that the unsolved 1984 attack and the serial murders were likely committed by the same offender. When they delved further into the case, they discovered that the victim had settled out of court with the attacker, who was revealed to be none other than Kang, who worked as a hairdresser in Gongju. Due to the fact that he strongly resembled the suspect described by the monk, the authorities considered him a credible suspect and raided his home to arrest him. Kang did not resist his arrest, and simply calmly said that "[he] knew [the police] would come to catch [him]."

== Trial, imprisonment, and execution ==
For his crimes, Kang Chang-gu was convicted of the six murders and sentenced to death. At his trial, he expressed remorse for his actions and cried when the verdict was announced. While awaiting execution at the Seoul Detention Center in Uiwang, he converted to Catholicism. On April 17, 1990, Kang was among nine violent criminals to be hanged for their respective crimes; he and several others offered to donate their eyes and kidneys for science as a sign of penance.

== See also ==
- Capital punishment in South Korea
- List of serial killers by country

== Bibliography ==
- Kim Bok-jun (February 28, 2020). 공유하기 대한민국 살인사건. 2 [Korean Murder Cases, 2nd Edition] (in Korean). House With a Well Publishers. ISBN 978-1190631007.
