= Yeongsanjae =

Korean Buddhist ceremony

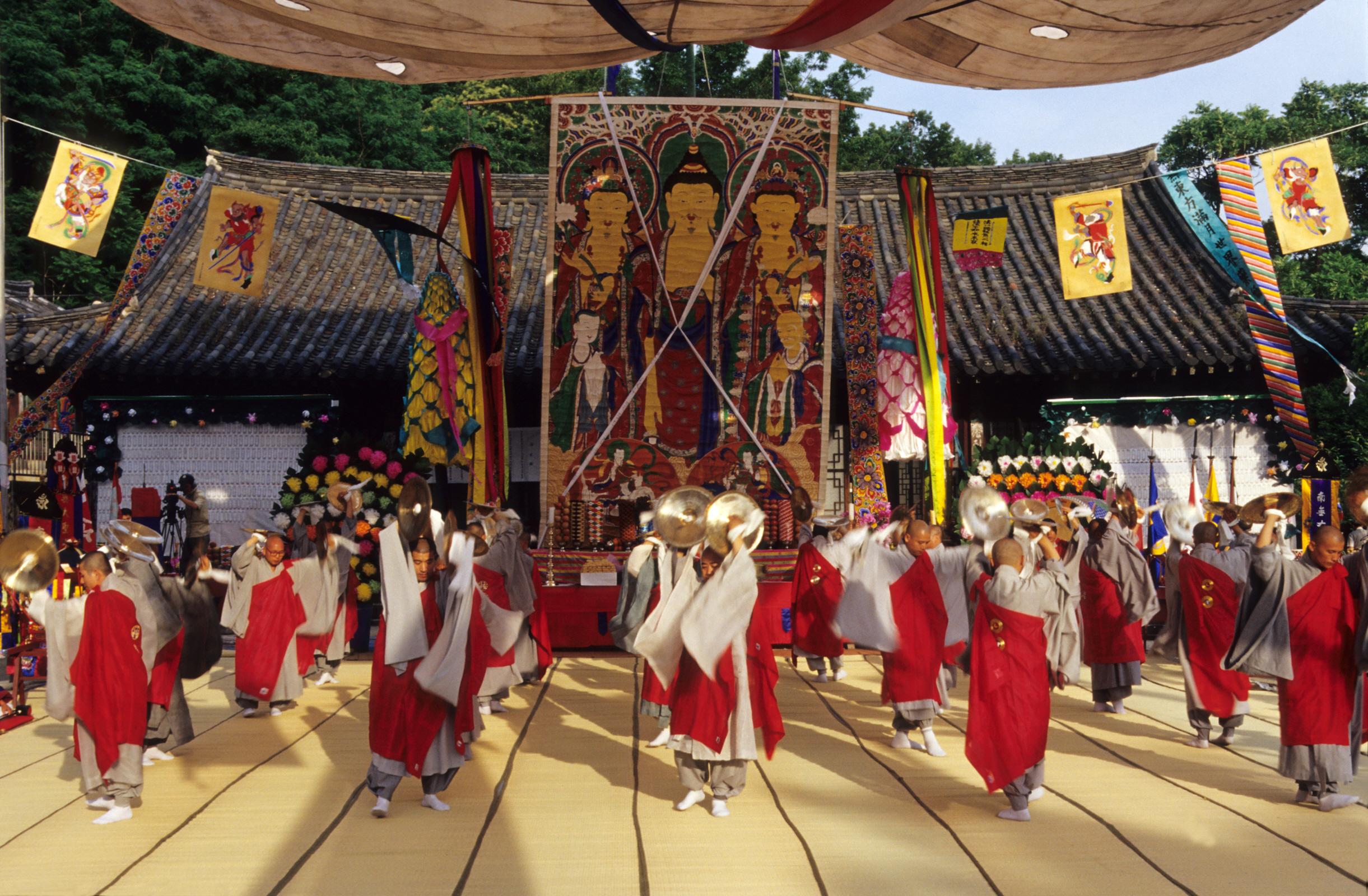
A performance at Bongwonsa (2003)

Yeongsanjae (Korean: 영산재; Hanja: 靈山齋) is a Korean Buddhist ceremony which re-enacts Siddhartha Gautama delivering the sermon now known as the Lotus Sutra. This ritual is a form of philosophical and spiritual message in Korean Buddhism. The purpose of this is to be a guide for the deceased soul to transfer to the Pure Land of Ultimate Bliss. The attendees would learn self-discipline, art forms for meditation, training, and enlightenment from this ceremony, it consists of various rituals. From the teaching of Buddha, “All living beings must die, and all those who meet must part,” both the living and the dead may escape from agony and suffering by accepting the noble truths. Primarily preserved and conducted by the Taego Order, the ceremony, which takes place annually on June 6, includes tea ceremonies, decorations, prayers, rites of purification, offerings to Buddha, and rites for the dead. There are also many different music that are used in the ceremonies, along with the use of certain Martial arts.

The Bongwon Temple was built in 889 located at Ansan Mountain in Bongwon-dong, Seodaemun-gu, Seoul is the main temple of the Taego Order. They teach this ceremony as well as hold international seminars to introduce this ritual to other countries. They also conduct annual performances on Korean Memorial Day.

== History ==
The dance originated during the Goryeo period.

Yeongsanjae is one form of Buddhist ritual, performed in hopes of wishing the deceased to rest in peace and be free from the sufferings. Yeongsanjae is practiced on the 49th day after a person’s death because in Buddhism, it is believed that the soul of the deceased will reach the heaven on the 49th day. In the past, Yeongsanjae was practiced for over 3 days, but now it has been reduced in size, which they only perform the ceremony for one day. While there are many other forms about 49th day rituals, Yeongsanjae is known to be the largest ritual of all.

It is one of the Important Intangible Cultural Properties of Korea, having been designated as such in 1973. In order to preserve Yeongsanjae, Korea has created the Yeongsanjae Preservation Society.

== Dances ==
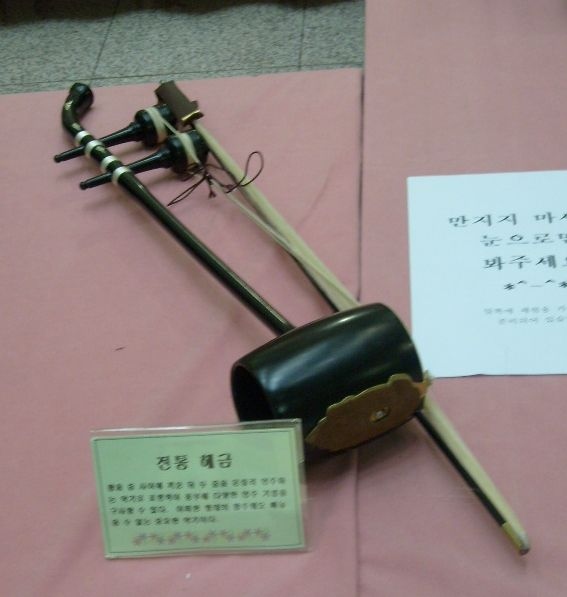
Haegeum Jang-gu Geomungo

=== Barachum ===
Barachum, also known as the cymbals dance, was named this because they used the instrument called “bara”. This dance was performed to defeat the evil spirits and purifying the mind. While the dance contains several different dance moves such as moving forward, backward, and roaring while hitting the bara, most of the movements are very static and rarely moves or makes a loud sound. This is because Barachum is designed to make solemn atmosphere.

=== Beopgochum ===
Beopgochum is another dance that is performed during Yeongsanjae. “Beopgo” refers to one of the Buddhist instruments that looks like a big drum made with wood. Usually, Beopgochum is performed in a team of two: one main person who performs the dance while another plays the instruments. Unlike Barachum and Nabichum, Beopgochum contains rapid, big movements and loud sounds. This dance is performed at the end of the ceremony, after Barachum and Nabichum. By performing the dance at the end, it expresses the joy and enthusiasm that the ritual has smoothly practiced.

=== Nabichum ===
Nabichum was named because the dance moves resemble the appearance of nabi, which means a butterfly in Korean. Nabichum contains the most gentle moves out of all the dances performed during the Yeongsnajae. Nabichum is performed during the offering and worshiping, in hopes of repentance.

== Music ==
Along with dances, traditional Korean instruments are played all throughout the ceremony. Some of the instruments played at the Yeongsanjae are jang-gu (Korean drum), haegeum (string instruments ), and geomungo (instrument with six strings). In this ceremony, a special song, called Beompae is played.

Haegeum: Two-stringed vertical instrument that has unique, high-pitched and expressive sounds. It was introduced from China to Korea during the Koryo dynasty (918- 1392). Traditionally, the sound box is made by hard wood like a quince tree, mulberry tree, big-sized bamboo, or shiny xylosma with two strings made of silk or nylon.

Jang-gu: Jang-gu is a Korean traditional drum instrument with a two sound boxes made from animal skin and a shape is similar to an hourglass. The older the tree is stronger the sounds get and it can produce different sounds depending on the location of the tapping. It was called ‘Yogo’, the drum to be put on the waist.

Geomungo: Geomungo, also called in hyeonhakgeum (현학금) is one of traditional string instrument in South Korea has deep and resonant sounds. It’s made from high-quality materials by skilled artisans. Traditionally, the front plate of the instrument is made from paulownia wood and the back plate is made from chest wood, and the strings are made with silk or nylon.

"Beompae (梵唄) used in Buddhist ceremonies is a tribute to Beomseo (梵書) and is called Eosan (魚山). Regarding the origin of beompae, there are theories of the origin of Yeongsanhoesang, myoeum bodhisattva’s music offering, and Chinese breakfast creation theory.契), and Kang Seung-hoe (康僧会) made the Nihang Beompae (泥恒梵唄) and spread the name of the Beompae (梵唄聲明) in Gangnam. This beompae was passed down to the Korean beompae by Jingamseonsa (眞鑑禪師), who went to the Tang Dynasty to study abroad."

== Procedures ==
There are a total of 12 steps to performing the Yeongsanjae and each step of the procedure has its own meaning.

1. Siryeon 시련(侍輦) The purpose of this is to receive all the saints and spirits of the heaven.
1. Dae-ryung 대령(對靈) given the direction where to follow.
1. Gwanyok 관욕(灌浴) to clean the three karmas of the spirits
1. Jojeonjeoman 조전점안(造錢點眼) ’Jejeon` means money and it refers to the money to be used in afterlife.
1. Sinjung-jackbeob 신중작법(神衆作法) Tea ceremony to help performance well.
1. Gwaebul-un 괘불이운(掛佛移運) A large scroll painting that is hung outside a temple during the ceremony.
1. Sangdan-gwongong 상단권공(上壇勸供) A rice meal to help Buddhas, Bodhisattvas, and the Three Jewels of Buddhism.
1. Beopmun 법문(法門) The monk reaffirms the purpose of the ceremony and give the details sermon.
1. Sikdang-jakbeob 식당작법(食堂作法) Offering the food to the uppermost altar (Buddhas, bodhisattvas, sages, and the Three Jewels of Buddhism).
1. Jungdan-gwongong 중단권공(中壇勸供)Offering the food to the middlemost altar (Divyagarbhah Bodhisattva and the retinue of heaven; Dharanimdhara and the retinue of earth; and Ksitigarbha and the retinue of the underworld).
1. Shisik 시식(施食) Offering the food to the lowermost altar (The lonely spirits).
1. Bongsong 봉송(奉送)All the participating in the ritual are dismissed by burning spirit tablets, banners, flowers, and other accoutrements used in the ritual.

== Law Enforcement ==
Jakbeopmu can be said to be an enlightenment martial art, where which one makes offerings to the body through body movements, reciting the Buddha with their mouth, and thinking of the 3 treasures of fire, law, and victory in mind. This writing method is carried out in harmony with Eojang Master's clear voice" In Yeongsanjae, there are 4 different types of Jakbeopmu:

1. Baramu (바라무) These were Baramu's ordeal poems: Gwanyoksi, Shinsinjokbeopsi, Jojeonjeomansi, Gwaebuliunsi. These are a public announcement of the upper part and a restaurant recipe poem.
2. Nabimu (나비무) "Butterfly radish ordeal poetry (single method of four directions, multiple methods, cultivating method), gaebuliunsi (multiple methods), upper-gwon public poetry (three spirits method, doryang method, multiple method, hyanghwa crab method, three male taesjak, spear) After marriage, the Hell Manipulation Method, the Salvation Keonjang method, the yokgeoni/jeongbeop world mantra, then the Baron Om method, the Unshim crab method, the Diagonal Shakyat veneration method), and the dining room method poem (jagwi’s illegitimate method)."
3. Beopgomu (법고무) "Trial poem (beop rubber after the ear cultivation method), disclosure of the upper volume (beop rubber after a method of cultivation), and a restaurant method poem (beop rubber after the cultivation method)."
4. Tajumu (타주무) This is a dance performed between the ceremonial ceremonies in the restaurant recipe.

== Majesty ==
Majesty is a decorative element which refers to the splendid decoration of the sanctuary where the Buddha is enshrined and the doryang with various fire bodhisattvas inscribed with the name of the Bodhisattva and Jihwa. The solemnity of decoration is divided into worship and indoctrination. "The solemnity for worship is a mural or Buddhist painting depicting the object or image being worshipped, and the solemnity for education is a Buddhist evangelism. These are paintings and murals that contain the contents of the original life and the original life, and are expressed in sculptures or paintings." Majesty can be used to help a person who is new to Buddhism understand what is happening.
