= Oen Bo-hyun =

South Korean rapist and spree killer (1957–1995)

Oen Bo-Hyun
- Born: April 6, 1957; Gimje, South Korea
- Died: November 2, 1995 (aged 38); Seoul Detention Center, Uiwang, South Korea
- Cause of death: Execution by hanging
- Status: Executed
- Conviction: Murder (2 counts)
- Penalty: Death

Details
- Date: September 1–14, 1994
- Locations: Seoul and its surroundings
- Killed: 2
- Injured: 4
- Weapons: Plastic bag, knife

Oen Bo-Hyun (Korean: 온보현; Hanja: 溫保鉉, April 6, 1957 – November 2, 1995) was a South Korean spree killer and rapist who attacked six women in Seoul in September 1994, killing two. Convicted of the murders, he was subsequently executed in 1995.

== Murders ==
- September 1, 1994 - At around 1 AM, he picked up a karaoke hostess named Kwon in his stolen taxi at the Songpa District, threatening the woman and thereafter raping her on a nearby road. He then drove her to his hometown, where Oen raped her again, and then tied her to a nearby tree with some string.
- September 11, 1994 - At around 7:30 PM, in Doksan-dong, Oen threatened another woman with his gun and kidnapped her. He took her to a hill in Hoengseong County, where he raped her and stole 310,000 won in cash.
- September 12, 1994 - At around 9:30 PM, he kidnapped Yang Heo in front of the Phospho Building in Seocho-dong, taking her to Hoengseong. The following day, at around 5:30 PM, he dragged the victim to a hillside near Singal-dong, and attempted to rape Yang, but when she resisted, he suffocated her with a plastic bag and then abandoned the body on site.
- September 14, 1994 - at about 9 PM, he kidnapped another woman, Yang Park, from Garak-dong, taking her to Apo-eup, where he subsequently killed her. The body was later discarded around the upper or lower lines of the Gyeongbu Expressway.
- September 27, 1994 - following the recent arrest of the Chijon family, the Seocho Police Station were pressured into capturing the rogue killer.

== After the arrest ==
=== Investigation ===
Under the leadership of prosecutor Hong Joon-pyo, on-site verification were conducted on the Gyeongbu Expressway, where Bo-Hyun had murdered Yang Park, and in the hills of Ojeong-ri, where he had killed Yang Heo. The police claimed that there were no additional victims aside from the six known cases. He was investigated for other possible crimes, but none were linked back to Oen.

=== Reaction ===
Oen Bo-Hyun's crime spree was uncovered immediately after the Chijon family's killings, causing a great social impact. Citizens complained about the spike of serial murder in the country, with women being extremely reluctant to take taxis at night. In response, precautions were taken to prevent any further incidents.

In an interview with Weekly Trends in August 2006, Pyo Chang-won, a professor at the Korean National Police University, pointed out that the backgrounds of serial killers such as the Chijon Family, Oen Bo-Hyun and Yoo Young-chul is marred by a twisted psychological state, childhood issues and dissatisfaction with society. Pyo analyzed that they had a common tendency to rationalize their own failures and frustrations by blaming society for them, and thus, they committed crimes to get back at the purported "corrupt" society.

== Execution ==
Oen Bo-Hyun was sentenced to death for his crimes, and on November 2, 1995, he, along with 19 other violent criminals, including most members of the Chijon family, were executed.

== See also ==
- Chijon family
- Capital punishment in South Korea
- List of serial rapists
