= Bo-hyun =

- Hangul: 보현
- RR: Bohyeon
- MR: Pohyŏn

Bo-hyun (Korean: 보현) is a Korean given name. As of 2026, the name ranked 748th out of 36,179 male names and 490th out of 28,726 female names. A total of 1,378 people, consisting of 507 males and 871 females, were born with the name from 2008 to 2026.

Notable people with the name include:

- Ahn Bo-hyun, South Korean actor and model
- Oen Bo-hyun, South Korean spree killer and rapist
- Kim Pohyŏn, paternal grandfather of the founder of North Korea, Kim Il Sung
- Yoon Bo-hyun, South Korean physician and scientist

== See also ==
- List of Korean given names
