= National Forensic Service =

South Korean government agency

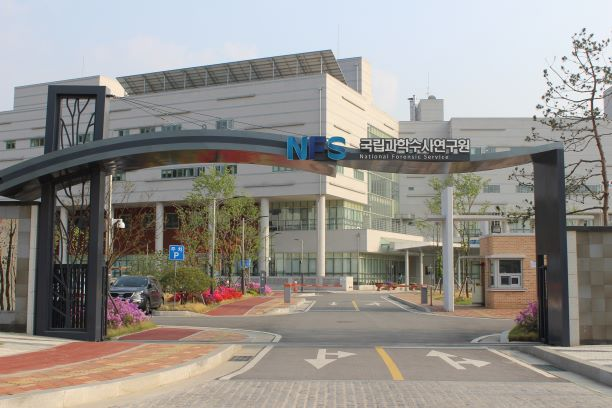

Agency overview
- Formed: March 25, 1955 (71 years, 6 months)
- Headquarters: Wonju, Gangwon Province
- Employees: 458
- Director General responsible: Bong-woo Lee
- Website: 국립과학수사연구원 (Korean language); National Forensic Service (en-UK)

Korean name
- Hangul: 국립과학수사연구원
- Hanja: 國立科學搜査硏究院
- RR: Gungnip gwahak susa yeonguwon
- MR: Kungnip kwahak susa yŏn'guwŏn

The National Forensic Service (NFS; Korean: 국립과학수사연구원) is a South Korean government agency under the Ministry of the Interior and Safety which conducts forensic examinations and research. Established in 1955, the NFS oversees the majority of forensic analysis in criminal cases in South Korea. It is currently headquartered in Wonju, Gangwon Province.

== History ==
The National Forensic Service was established on March 25, 1955, under the Ministry of Home Affairs, to specialize in medicinal and physicochemical forensics outside of fingerprint analysis.

Originally an auxiliary agency, the NFS expanded in scope and size upon playing key forensic roles in major criminal cases. Most notably, in May 1965, NFS investigators revealed that multiple South Korean pharmaceutical companies were illegally dosing their products with the synthetic opioid methadone.

DNA profiling in South Korea began in the 1990s with the establishment of the NFS's DNA analysis center in 1991. Genetic analysis was extensively used by the NFS to identify the victims of the 1995 Sampoong Department Store collapse, and later Lee Choon-jae, the perpetrator of the Hwaseong serial murders.

The NFS relocated its headquarters to Wonju, Gangwon Province, in 2013, with its previous headquarters in Seoul now becoming the agency's Seoul Institute.

== Organization ==
As of November 2025, the NFS consists of 12 divisions and 5 institutes (Seoul, Busan, Daegu, Gwangju, Daejeon), with one branch in Jeju.
