= Taego Order =

Order of Korean Buddhism

- Hangul: 태고종
- Hanja: 太古宗
- RR: Taegojong
- MR: T'aegojong

The Central Council of the Taego Order of Korean Buddhism in Seoul

The Taego Order or Taego-jong is the second largest order in Korean Seon, the Korean branch of Chan Buddhism.

== Characteristics ==
Seonamsa is one of the head monasteries of the Taego Order, which includes over 8,000 monastics and 3,100 temples.

What distinguishes the Taego Order from other forms of Korean Buddhism like the Jogye Order of Seon is that it allows ordained priests to marry, although nuns must remain celibate. This custom of married priests is a remnant of Korea under Japanese rule. However, not all Taego priests are married. This order also includes traditional monks. Monks tend to remain more separate from society and live in mountain temples, whereas the married clerics are more like parish priests, though this is not always the case.

According to the Patriarch of the Taego Order Overseas Parish, Venerable Dr. Jongmae Kenneth Park, the Taego and Jogye orders follow the same Prātimokṣa, the vinaya of the Dharmaguptaka also followed in Vietnam and China. There are 250 bhiksu precepts, 348 bhiksuni precepts, and 10 śrāmaṇera and śrāmaṇerī (novice) precepts. However, celibacy is optional.

Both the Taego and the Jogye use the Brahma Net Sutra, which contain 10 bodhisattva vows and 48 lesser precepts. Contrary to some misconceptions, the Taego Order does not use bodhisattva vows as the basis of its ordinations.

The Taego Order formed in the 1970s from the monks left out of the then Christian-dominated military government's officially recognized group of monks that became the Jogye Order. This group consisted of 300 celibate Seon practitioners. One result of this split was that the ritual masters all remained with what became the Taego Order. Today, the Taego Order preserves the full ritual tradition of Korean Buddhism, including the Yeongsanjae, which is a reenactment of the Buddha's preaching of the Lotus Sutra on Vulture Peak. This ritual is held each year at Bongwonsa on June 6, South Korea's Memorial Day, in part to pray for the dead from the Korean War.

== History ==
Before 1945 the majority of Korean Buddhist monastics were descended from Taego Bou, especially within the Jogye Order, which was founded at the end of Goryeo. This unified order continued until 1954, when Syngman Rhee and a number of monks ordered a separation of the order into two parts, one composed of 300 celibate monks and the other a combination of celibate monks and priests, the latter of which would become the Taego Order.

The group of 300 celibate monks retained the name "Jogye Order" but changed the color of the kasa, the outer monastic robe worn over the left shoulder and under the right arm, to brown despite the fact that the traditional color of a Korean kasa was red. This was done to create a visual distinction between the orders. North Korean Buddhist clergy most often use the most traditional robes – a red kasa and a dark-blue or nearly black ceremonial robe.

After the separation of the orders, the monastics in the Jogye Order as well as the government suppressed the group that became the Taego Order, in part by forcing married clergy out of the temples so these disestablished priests had to establish a new order that would carry the characteristics of the original Jogye Order, including the use of the original red kasa, though allowing for marriage. In 1970 a new order was officially founded that was named for Taego Bou.

Of particular note in the Taego ritual tradition is the Yeongsanjae ritual. This is a reenactment of Shakyamuni Buddha's teaching of the Lotus Sutra on Vulture Peak. It involves a great deal of chanting and dancing. The full ritual is quite long, but is sometimes performed in an abbreviated fashion lasting just a few hours. This ritual is chiefly preserved in the Taego Order and has been recognized as an intangible cultural asset by UNESCO.

== Training for Clergy ==
The training for Taego clergy is similar to that of the Jogye Order. Taego novitiates can study at a gangwon, which is a traditional academic institute similar to the Tibetan shedra. They can also attend the Central Sangha College run by the Jogye Order. Another option in both orders is to pursue a modern education, generally in Buddhist Studies.

For novice monastics who study at a gangwon or modern academic institution to fulfill their basic education requirement, four years of study/training are required. After this, they may be ordained a bhikkhu or bhikkhuni if they pass an examination and then either work at a temple in a capacity similar to that of a "parish priest," or continue their training and education. For students at a gangwon, they would then have the option to study for four years at a yulwon, which is a Vinaya school. Upon graduation they would be known as Vinaya masters. For this reason, yulwon students must be celibate. Taego monastics may also study at a yeombulwon, which is a ritual training school focusing on traditional chanting, ritual, music, and dance after taking full ordination. These students may request private tutoring for further training in ritual after graduation from the full four-year program, though some programs offer two- and three-year options as well. Fully ordained monastics may train at a Seonwon in meditation as well. This consists of two roughly 3-month retreats each year. In between retreats, these monastics would travel from temple to temple until the next retreat starts. Students in this system do not study under one master at one temple, but participate in retreats at different temples under different masters for many years.

For training in Seon, there is no "graduation" after a specific number of years. In rare cases, a student may receive dharma transmission or inka from a master of Seon after 20 or 30 years of practice. However, Dharma transmission in the Seon tradition is extremely rare.

== America-Europe Parish ==
As for foreign clergy, there are a growing number of Taego Order clergy in the U.S., Canada and Europe. According to the Taego Order website (listed below), international clergy (that is, those who are not Korean) can study for ordination from home in a two-year program through the Institute for Buddhist Studies. This is a two-year program leading to ordination as a samanera (though not necessarily with vows of celibacy) or samaneri (requiring a vow of celibacy). The ordinations are carried out in South Korea. Dharma teachers can also be ordained after completing this program. These ordinations are conducted in the West. (Graduation from the seminary does not itself guarantee ordination. In addition, the seminary itself does not conduct ordinations - the Korean Taego Order conducts the ordinations.) The website does not clarify the difference between regular clergy and Dharma teachers, however the primary difference is that Dharma Teachers have fewer obligations and cannot be abbots of temples. Dharma Teachers also do not perform ordinations, memorial chanting, the "eye-opening ceremony" (consecrating religious images), nor do they perform the Dharma transmission rite (Inka). In both the Taego and Jogye orders, only monastics are eligible to receive Inka.

The website currently lists more than 56 clergy in the America-Europe Parish (covering the U.S., Canada, and Europe) though a few are Koreans living overseas. There are also temples in New Jersey (Bogota and Warren), New York (Staten Island), Georgia (Hampton), Virginia (Annandale), Texas (Austin), Michigan (Royal Oak and Grand Rapids), Canada (Brampton, ON), California (Anaheim, Los Angeles, Seal Beach, and Pinion Hills), Idaho (Mountain Home), Missouri (St. Louis), the Washington, D.C. area, Hong Kong, Poland (Opole), Austria (Vienna), Hungary and Germany in Solingen, Nuremberg and Munich).

The first Westerner ordained as a Taego monk is Dae Il Sunim (Dr. David Zuniga). Dae Il Sunim is also the first board-certified Buddhist chaplain. He currently works as a psychologist in Texas. However, the majority of Taego clergy in the West are disciples or grand-disciples of Dr. Jongmae Park. Dr. Park retired from the faculty at Loyola Marymount University in the Los Angeles area as of 2014.
