= Bongwonsa =

Buddhist temple in Seoul, South Korea

Coordinates: 37°34′19″N 126°56′51″E

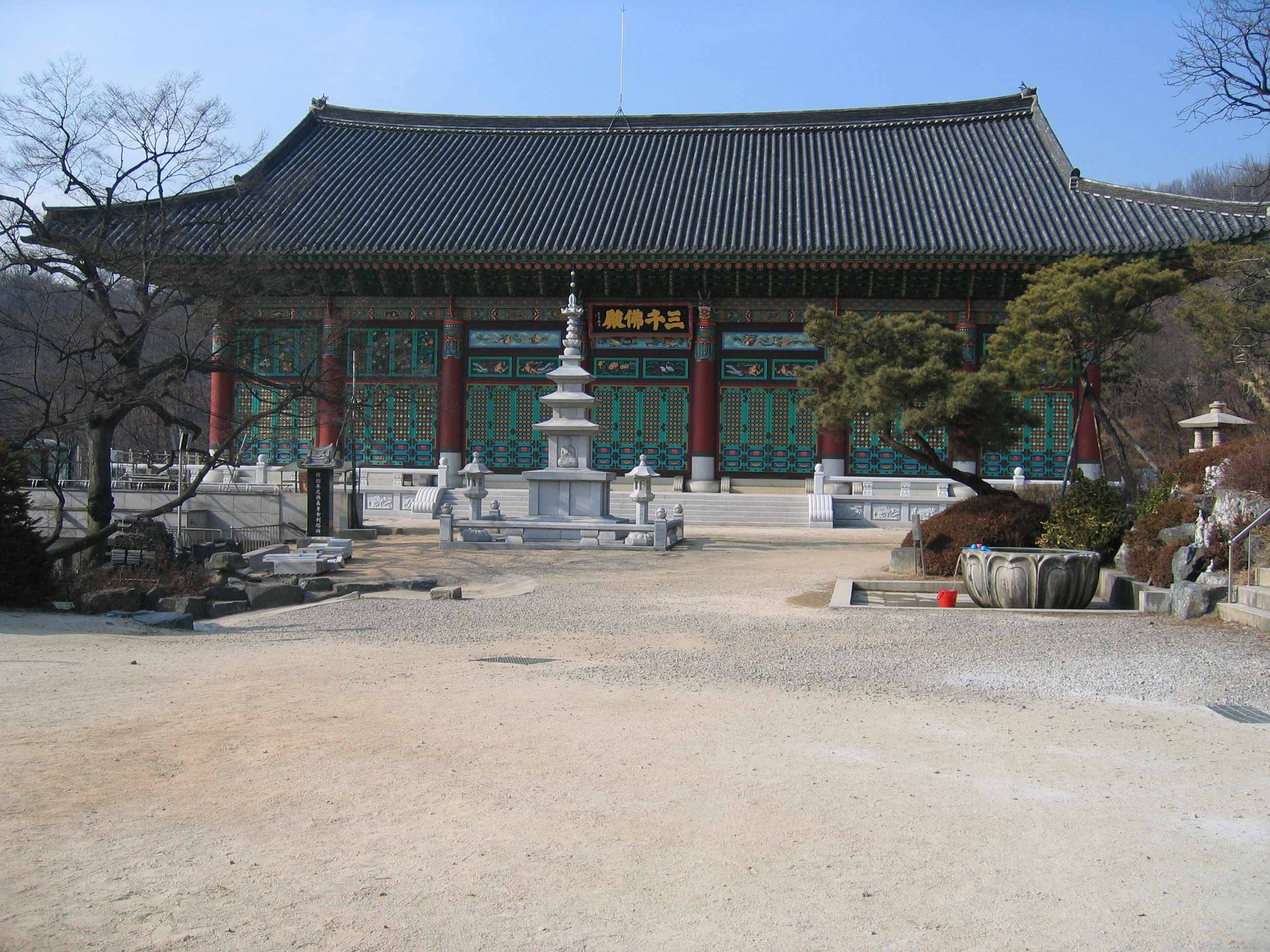
- Part of Bongwon Temple

Korean name
- Hangul: 봉원사
- Hanja: 奉元寺
- RR: Bongwonsa
- MR: Pongwŏnsa

Bongwonsa (Korean: 봉원사; also Bongwon Temple) is a South Korean Buddhist temple in Bongwon-dong, Seodaemun District, Seoul, South Korea.

== Description ==
It is located at the base of the mountain Ansan. It is the head temple of the Taego Order of Korean Buddhism.

More than 50 monks live at the temple and are engaged in education and social welfare work.

== History ==
It was founded in 889 by Master Doseon at where Yonsei University is now located. The temple was moved to its present location in 1748.

Part of the temple was destroyed in 1950 during the Korean War. In 1966 a new hall was built, but this was later moved to another part of the city. In 1991, while a new Hall of 3000 Buddhas was being built, a fire destroyed the Main Buddha Hall, which was rebuilt in 1994.

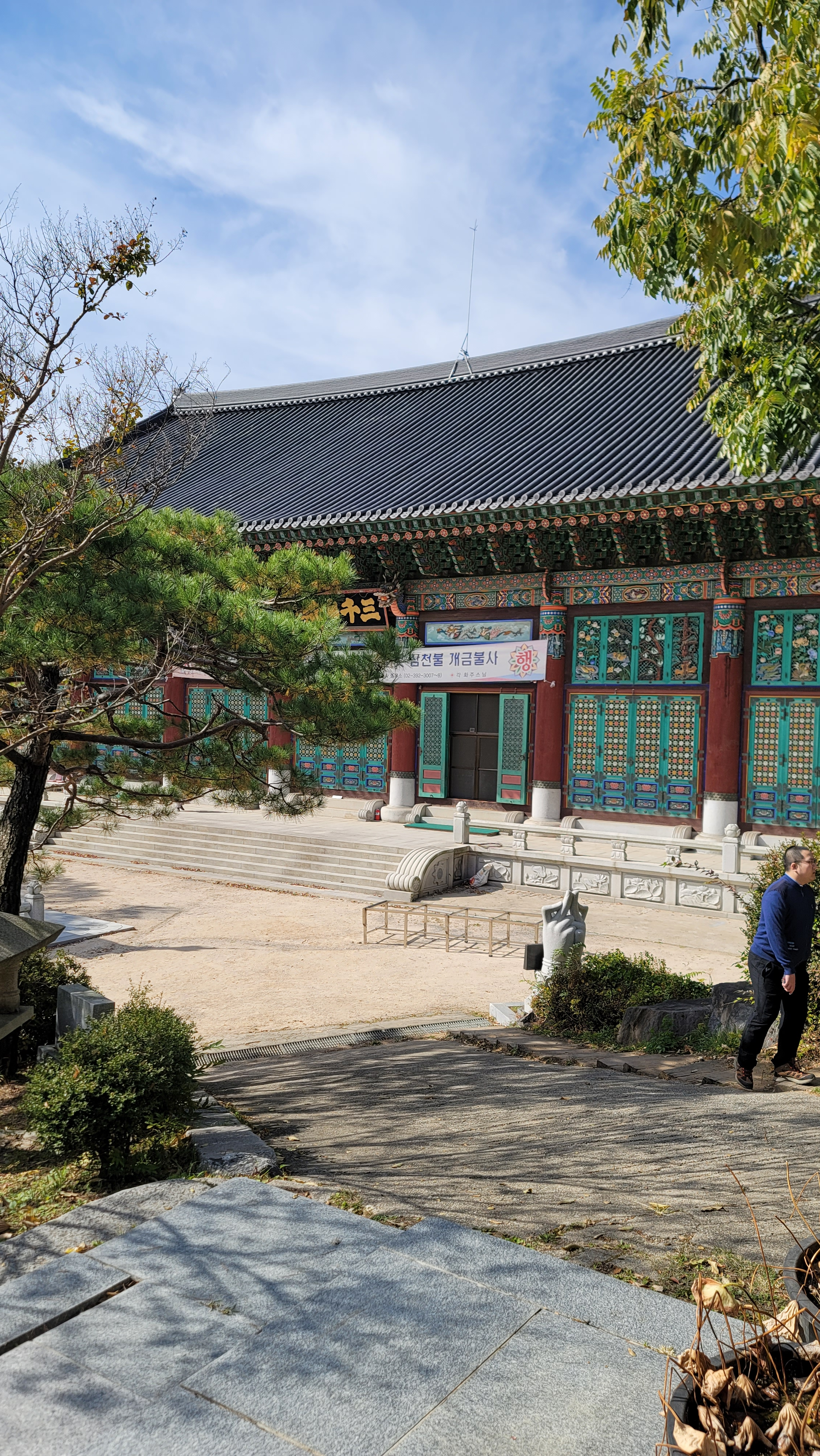
Bonwongsa hall of 3000 Buddha's

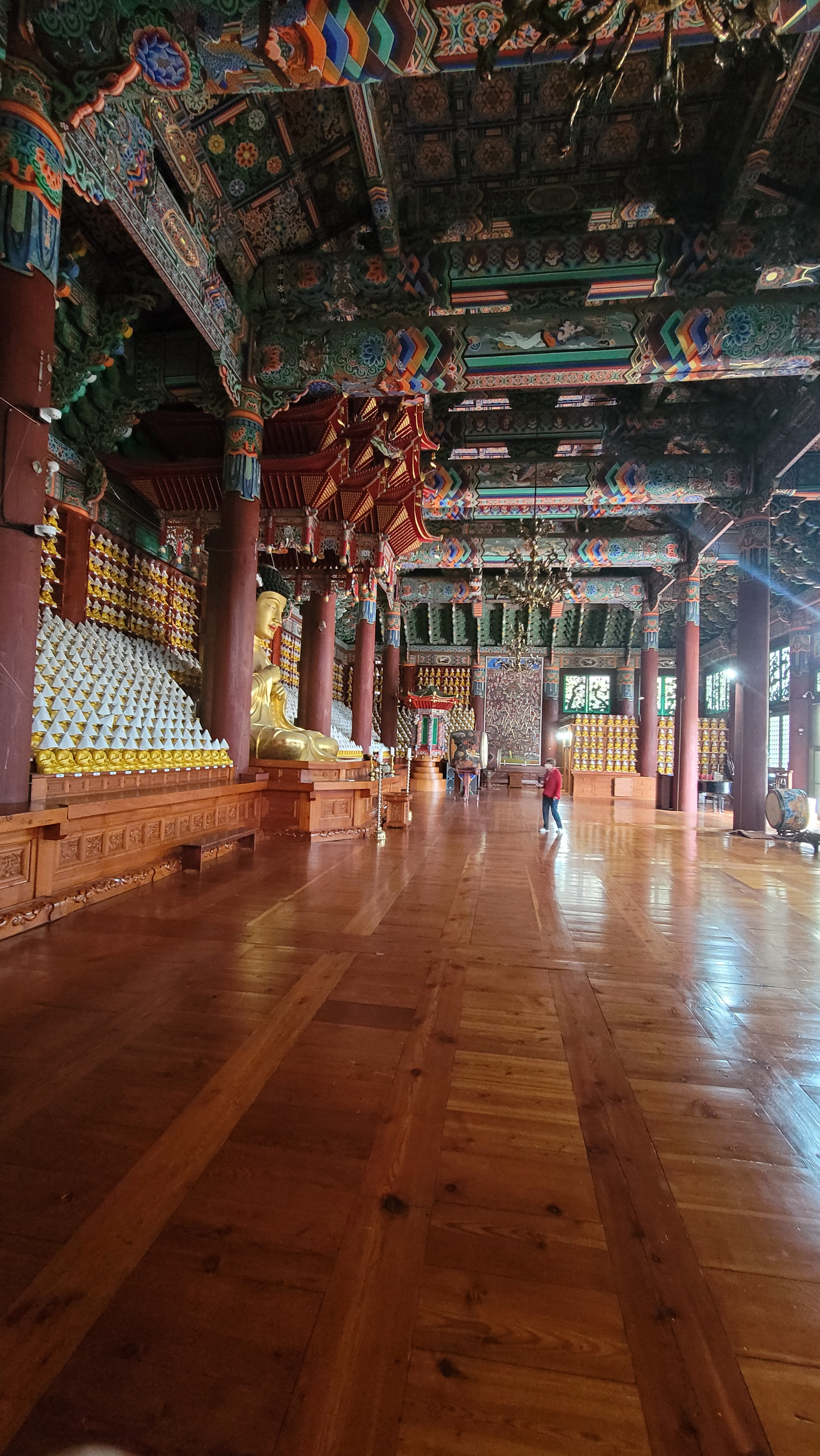
Bonwongsa hall of 3000 Buddha's - interior

In the summer of 2004, it was discovered that serial killer Yoo Young-chul had buried around eleven bodies of his victims near the temple.

== Sixteen Arhat statues ==
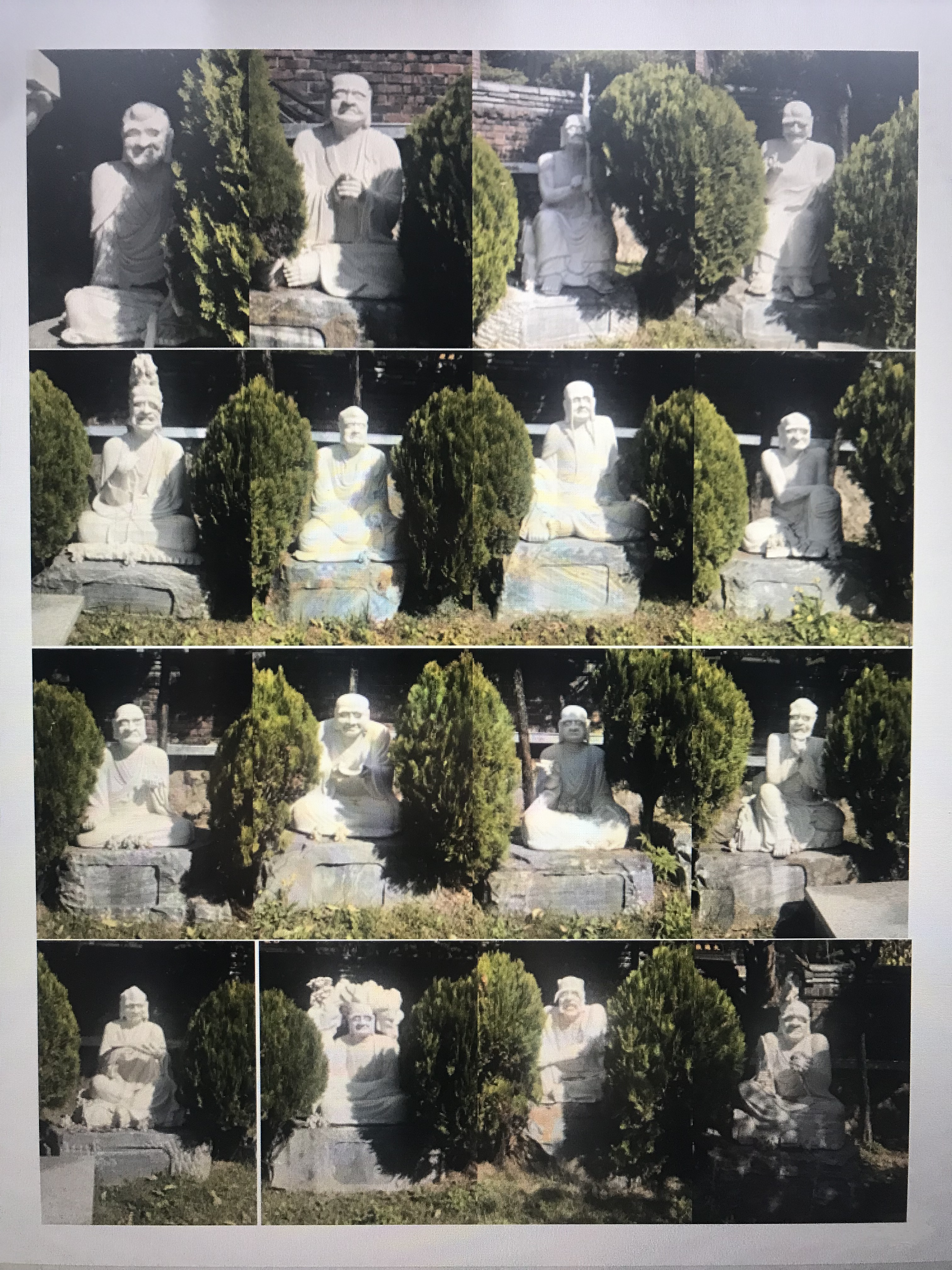
16 Arhat statues at Bonwongsa.

In the garden of the Buddhist Temple one can find 16 white statues. These are the 16 Arhat - the Enlightened ones. In Theravada Buddhism and in Mahayana Buddhism, the Arhat (saint) has attained enlightenment and may choose to guide others or not.

== See also ==
- Doseon
- Taego Order
- List of Buddhist temples in Seoul
- Korean Buddhist temples
- Korean Buddhism
