= Lee Choon-jae =

South Korean serial killer (born 1963)

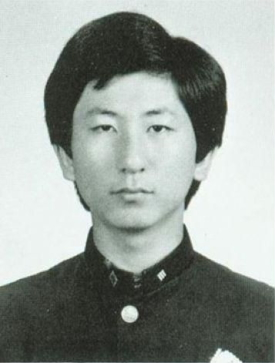
- Lee in his high school graduation photo in 1983
- Born: January 31, 1963 (age 63); Hwaseong, Gyeonggi Province, South Korea
- Height: 173 cm (5 ft 8 in)
- Spouse: Unknown (m. 1992)
- Children: 1
- Criminal information
- Conviction: Murder
- Penalty: Death (May 1994); commuted to 20 years to life in prison

Details
- Victims: 1 convicted murder, 15 confirmed 30+ confessed rapes and attempted rapes
- Span of crimes: February 8, 1986 – January 13, 1994
- Locations: Hwaseong, South Korea
- Date apprehended: January 18, 1994; 32 years ago

Korean name
- Hangul: 이춘재
- Hanja: 李春在
- RR: I Chunjae
- MR: I Ch'unjae

Lee Choon-jae (Korean: 이춘재; born January 31, 1963), also known as the Hwaseong Serial Killer, is a South Korean serial killer known for committing the Hwaseong serial murders (Korean: 화성 연쇄 살인 사건). Between 1986 and 1994, Lee murdered fifteen women and girls in addition to committing numerous sexual assaults, predominantly in Hwaseong, Gyeonggi Province, and the surrounding areas. The murders, which remained unsolved for thirty years, are considered to be the most infamous in modern South Korean history and were the inspiration for the film Memories of Murder (2003).

Lee was sentenced to life imprisonment with the possibility of parole after twenty years for killing his sister-in-law in 1994, but despite DNA evidence and his confession to the other murders in 2019, he could not be prosecuted for them because the statute of limitations had expired.

== Early life ==
Lee Choon-jae was born in Hwaseong, Gyeonggi Province, on January 31, 1963. According to his mother, he had a good education and worked well with others. Lee had a younger brother who drowned in his childhood, an incident which reportedly traumatized him.

After graduating from high school in February 1983, Lee joined the Republic of Korea Army and served as a tank driver until his discharge in January 1986. In 1990 he began working for a construction company as an unlicensed crane operator in the Cheongpa-dong neighbourhood of Seoul. The following year, Lee was employed as a crane operator for a company in Cheongwon, North Chungcheong Province, which he ultimately quit in March 1993. In April 1992, Lee married an administrator and had a son with her. However, Lee was a violent alcoholic who often physically abused his family.

On September 26, 1989, Lee broke into a house in Suwon and was discovered by the landlord. He was sentenced by the Suwon District Court to one year and six months' imprisonment in the first trial in February 1990 for the charges of robbery and assault. After the first trial, Lee filed an appeal, claiming that he was beaten by an unknown young man and entered the victim's house while being chased. In the second trial, the court suspended Lee's sentence to two years' probation. He was released in April 1990.

== Hwaseong serial murders ==
For a period of four years and seven months, between September 15, 1986, and April 3, 1991, Lee committed a series of rapes and murders in and around Hwaseong. The victims, all women, were found bound, gagged, raped and in most cases strangled to death with their own clothes, such as pantyhose or socks. The murders sparked the largest criminal case in South Korean history, with over 2 million man-days spent on investigation and over 21,000 suspects investigated. The murders remained unsolved for thirty years until Lee was identified as a suspect in 2019. He confessed to four undisclosed murders not originally included in the original list of crimes and all ten serial murders, including a case previously determined to be a copycat crime (for which a man named Yoon Sung-yeo had previously been sentenced to life imprisonment).

=== Background ===
On September 13, 1986, Lee Wan-im (71) disappeared while returning home after visiting her daughter. Her body was found in a pasture on 19 September, four days following her murder. A month later, on October 20, Park Hyun-sook (25) disappeared after getting off the bus while returning home from Songtan. Her body was found on October 23 in a canal. Two months later on December 12, Kwon Jung-bon (25) disappeared in front of her house. Her body was found four months later on April 23, 1987 on an embankment. Seven more murders followed over the following years. The last murder was estimated to have taken place around 21:00 on April 3, 1991. Kwon Soon-sang (69) was discovered raped and strangled with pantyhose on a hill.

=== Sister-in-law's murder and arrest ===
After his wife left him in December 1993, Lee invited his eighteen-year-old sister-in-law to his residence, then proceeded to drug, rape and kill her on January 13, 1994. According to the original investigator, Lee went to his father-in-law offering help in the search for the girl, and both reported that she might have been abducted. Lee was arrested on January 18 after repeated questioning where he later asked, "How many years do you serve in prison for rape and murder?" Lee denied any responsibility and the court overturned his confession, stating that he made a false statement because of police coercion. However, Lee was convicted and sentenced to death in May 1994, a conviction that was upheld in September of the same year. The Supreme Court of Korea reviewed the case in 1995, and Lee's death sentence was reduced to life imprisonment, with the possibility of parole after twenty years.

=== Investigation ===
The Hwaseong serial murders were the first identifiable string of murders in South Korea with a similar modus operandi. Investigators spent 2 million man-days on the case. The total number of suspects also grew, eventually reaching a total count of 21,280 individuals. In addition, 40,116 individuals had their fingerprints taken, and 570 DNA samples and 180 hair samples were analyzed.

The first five murders happened within a 6 km (3.7 mile) radius of Hwaseong, prompting police to spread out in teams of two, positioned every 100 meters (328 feet), but the next killing happened where there was no police presence. During the investigation, rumors that the killer targeted women wearing red clothes on rainy days spread, leading some female police officers to wear red clothes in an attempt to lure the killer into a trap.

A suspect sketch was drawn based on the memory of a bus driver (surname Kang) and bus conductor (surname Uhm) who witnessed a man boarding their bus shortly after the seventh murder on September 7, 1988. The characteristics of the suspect, which were described by the bus driver, were similar to the descriptions given by survivors who had been sexually assaulted. According to survivors, the perpetrator was a thin-framed man in his mid-twenties, with a height of 165 to 170 centimeters, short cut sporty-type hair, no double eyelids and a sharp nose. In addition, he was described as having soft hands. Police also stated that the suspect was blood type B, but in 2019 police acknowledged that this was likely inaccurate, because Lee had blood type O. A survivor of the murders, Lee Geum-ran (36), was attacked by Lee in late 1986 and she described him as skinny, with a low voice.

On July 27, 1989, Yoon Sung-yeo (22) was arrested for the murder of the eighth victim, fourteen-year-old Park Sang-hee. Yoon admitted guilt during questioning, and according to a 1989 report written by an expert at the National Forensic Service, tests of pubic hair samples found at the scene returned a 40% match with Yoon's. This case was determined to be a copycat crime, and Yoon was sentenced to life imprisonment. Reports state that at least four individuals, deemed as possible suspects, took their own lives in the 1990s after being investigated and allegedly abused by police.

=== Public reaction ===
The release of the film Memories of Murder (2003), which was partially inspired by the Hwaseong serial murders, sparked renewed interest in the case. The murder of a female college student in Hwaseong the following year also sparked fears that the killer had returned. The murders made headlines again as the statute of limitations for the most recent victims was due to expire on April 2, 2006.

At the time of the killings, there was a fifteen-year statute of limitations for first-degree murder. This was increased to twenty-five years in 2007, and finally lifted in 2015, but it was not retroactive. However, evidence and police records were kept due to the significance of the case.

=== Identification and confession ===
On September 18, 2019, police announced that Lee had been identified as a suspect in the Hwaseong serial murders. He was identified after DNA from the underwear of one of the victims was matched with his, and subsequent DNA testing linked him to four of the other unsolved murders. At the time he was identified, Lee was already serving a life sentence at a prison in Busan for the rape and murder of his sister-in-law. He initially denied any involvement in the serial murders, but on October 2, police announced that he had confessed to killing fourteen people, including all ten victims in the original investigation, which includes the case previously considered to be a copycat crime, and four others. Two of those other murders happened in Hwaseong but had not previously been attributed to Lee, and two happened in Cheongju. As of October 2019, details about those four victims have not been released. In addition to the murders, Lee also confessed to more than thirty rapes and attempted rapes.

On November 15, 2019, police announced that they had reached a provisional conclusion that Lee was responsible for all ten serial murders. Police expressed that Lee had weak self-esteem due to his introverted personality but experienced a sense of accomplishment and self-reliance for the first time during his military service, which led him to commit sex crimes to express his frustration caused by his monotonous life following his discharge. The provincial police chief stated that Lee displayed psychopathic tendencies by being unable to empathize with the victims' suffering and continuously showing off his crimes.

On July 2, 2020, police confirmed that Lee committed fourteen murders and nine rapes in relation to the Hwaseong serial murders with the motive of relieving his sexual desire, closing the case thirty-three years after the first killing. On November 2, 2020, Lee appeared in court as a witness for the eighth murder re-trial, where he publicly confessed to committing fourteen murders in relation to the Hwaseong serial murders and thirty sex crimes, which led to Yoon being acquitted. Lee remained in prison serving his life sentence. Lee also expressed that he had no intention of seeking parole and release, as he did not want to face public condemnation for his crime like notorious child rapist Cho Doo-soon, whose release after serving his twelve-year jail term led to widespread public outrage.

=== Wrongful conviction of Yoon Sung-yeo ===
After being sentenced to life imprisonment, Yoon Sung-yeo appealed his conviction on the grounds that police coerced him into giving false confessions through torture. His appeal was denied and he served over nineteen years in prison before being released on parole in 2009.

Yoon filed for a re-trial of his case on November 13, 2019, following news reports that Lee had confessed to all ten of the Hwaseong serial murders. Two days later, police announced that they had reached a provisional conclusion that Lee was responsible for the murder for which Yoon was convicted. Police said Lee's confession in the eighth murder "elaborately and coherently" described both the scene and the victim. This raised concerns Yoon had been the victim of a miscarriage of justice, with the district prosecutors' office confirming that Yoon endured cruel treatment by police at the time of his arrest and that the National Forensic Service report had been fraudulently written. In December 2019, the Gyeonggi South Provincial Police Agency booked and charged eight of the original investigators with abuse of power and illegal detention for allegedly physically abusing Yoon when he was a suspect, forcing him to make a false confession and falsifying investigative documents.

The court accepted Yoon's plea for a re-trial in January 2020. The final court hearing was held on November 2, 2020, where Lee stood as a witness confessing to the murder and describing the crime scene. Yoon was acquitted of murder on December 17, after the re-trial court accepted that he was innocent and found Lee guilty despite the expiration of the statute of limitations.

== List of known victims ==
The first 10 murders were part of the Hwaseong serial murders.

Crime	Date and time of crime (estimated)	Date and time of discovery	Victim and age	Location	Remarks
1	September 15, 1986; 06:20	September 19, 1986; 14:00	Lee Wan-im, 71	Taean-eup (now called Hwaseong), Annyeong-ri (now called Annyeong-dong), pasture	Elder murdered while returning home after visiting her daughter. Evidence found: Strangled by hand, negative semen reaction
2	October 20, 1986; 22:00	October 23, 1986; 14:50	Park Hyun-sook, 25	Taean-eup (now called Hwaseong), Jinan-ri (now called Jinan-dong), canal	Murdered after getting off the bus while returning home from Songtan after meeting with a prospective marriage partner. Evidence found: Strangled by hand, semen (blood type cannot be determined)
3	December 12, 1986; 23:00	April 23, 1987; 14:00	Kwon Jung-bon, 25	Taean-eup (now called Hwaseong), Annyeong-ri (now called Annyeong-dong), embankment	Housewife murdered in front of her house. Evidence found: Strangled by stockings, gagged with her stockings, panties on the face, semen (blood type cannot be determined)
4	December 14, 1986; 23:00	December 21, 1986; 12:30	Lee Kye-sook, 23	Jeongnam-myeon, Gwanhang-ri, ridge between rice fields	Murdered after getting off the bus while returning home after meeting with a prospective marriage partner. Evidence found: Hands tied, strangled and violated by an umbrella, girdle covering her face, semen (blood type cannot be determined)
5	January 10, 1987; 20:50	January 11, 1987; 13:00	Hong Jin-young, 19	Taean-eup (now called Hwaseong), Hwanggye-ri (now called Hwanggye-dong), rice paddy	High school girl murdered after getting off the bus while returning home. Evidence found: Hands tied, gagged with her socks, strangled, semen (blood type cannot be determined)
6	May 2, 1987; 23:00	May 9, 1987; 15:00	Park Eun-joo, 29	Taean-eup (now called Hwaseong), Jinan-ri (now called Jinan-dong), hill	Housewife murdered while going to give her husband an umbrella. Evidence found: strangled, semen (blood type cannot be determined)
7	September 7, 1987; 21:30	September 8, 1987; 09:30	Ahn Gi-soon, 54	Paltan-myeon, Gajae-ri, canal	Housewife murdered after getting off the bus while returning home. Evidence found: Hands tied, gagged with her socks and handkerchief, strangled, peach slices, semen (blood type cannot be determined)
8	September 16, 1988; 02:00	September 16, 1988; 06:50	Park Sang-hee, 14	Taean-eup (now called Hwaseong), Jinan-ri (now called Jinan-dong), house	Middle school girl murdered while sleeping in her room. Initially determined to be a copycat crime perpetrated by 22-year-old Yoon Sung-yeo, who served 19.5 years in jail before being released on parole in 2009. However, after Lee's confession in 2019, police reached a provisional conclusion that Lee was indeed the killer. Yoon filed for a re-trial on November 13, 2019.
9	November 15, 1990; 18:30 (weather: foggy)	November 16, 1990; 09:50	Kim Mi-jung, 14	Taean-eup (now called Hwaseong), Byeongjeom-dong (now called Byeongjeom-dong), hill	Middle school girl murdered while returning home. Evidence found: Hands and feet tied, strangled, gagged with her bra, ballpoint pen, fork, spoon and razor blade, semen (blood-type determined to be "B")
10	April 3, 1991; 21:00 (weather: clear)	April 4, 1991; 09:30	Kwon Soon-sang, 69	Dongtan-myeon, Bansong-ri (now called Bansong-dong), hill	Elder murdered after getting off the bus while returning home. Evidence found: Strangled, two footprint marks (couldn't be analyzed), semen (blood-type determined to be "B")
11	December 24, 1987	January 4, 1988	Kim Mi-soon, 18	Hwaseong	
12	July 7, 1989	N/A	Kim Hyun-jung, 8	Hwaseong	
13	January 26, 1991	January 27, 1991	Park Mi-hwa, 17	Hwaseong	
14	March 7, 1991	March 7, 1991	Kim Hong-bun, 27	Cheongju, North Chungcheong Province	
15	January 13, 1994	January 15, 1994	Lee's sister-in-law, 18	Bokdae-dong, Cheongju, North Chungcheong Province	Lee was sentenced to death for rape and murder. Reduced to life imprisonment by the Supreme Court.

== In popular culture ==
Several films and television shows were based on the Hwaseong serial murders:

- Memories of Murder (2003)
- Confession of Murder (2012)
- Gap-dong (2014)
- Signal (2016)
- Tunnel (2017)
- Criminal Minds (2017)
- Partners for Justice (2018)
- Signal (2018)
- Unknown Number (2019)
- Flower of Evil (2020)
- Taxi Driver (2021)
- The Scarecrow (2026)

== See also ==
- List of serial killers by country
- List of serial killers by number of victims
