= Yoo Young-chul =

South Korean serial killer (born 1970)

- 유영철
- Born: 18 April 1970 (age 56); Gochang County, South Korea
- Other name: Raincoat Killer (레인 코트 킬러)
- Height: 170 cm (5 ft 7 in)
- Children: 1
- Status: Incarcerated
- Motive: Misogyny; hatred of rich people
- Criminal charges: Theft (1988; 1991; 1993; 1998; 2004); selling child pornography (1995); forgery, identity theft (1998); child sexual abuse (2000); murder, cannibalism (2004)
- Penalty: 10 months (1991); 8 months (1993); 2 years (1998); 3 years and 6 months (2000); Death (2004)

Details
- Span of crimes: 2003–2004
- Country: South Korea
- Targets: Women; wealthy seniors
- Killed: 20 convicted
- Date apprehended: 15 July 2004
- Imprisoned at: Seoul Detention Center

Korean name
- Hangul: 유영철
- Hanja: 柳永哲
- RR: Yu Yeongcheol
- MR: Yu Yŏngch'ŏl

Yoo Young-chul (Korean: 유영철; born 18 April 1970), also known as the Raincoat Killer or Raincoat Man, is a South Korean serial killer, sex offender, and self-confessed cannibal. After he admitted to the murders of multiple people, mostly prostitutes and wealthy old couples, the Seoul Central District Court convicted him of 20 murders, although one case was dismissed when it turned out that the crime had been committed by another serial killer, Jeong Nam-gyu. Yoo burned three and mutilated at least 11 of his victims and admitted that he ate the livers of some of his victims. He committed his crimes between September 2003 and July 2004 and was apprehended on 15 July 2004. Yoo explained his motives in front of a TV camera saying "Women shouldn't be sluts, and the rich should know what they've done."

== Biography ==
Yoo's maternal grandmother recalled that she had been so distressed by the hardships of life that she had thought about killing him and that he had been a burden to her daughter her entire life.

Yoo had hoped to attend an arts high school, but after experiencing the humiliation of a color-blind interview, he spent his time fiddling with drawing pencils instead of paints, developing an eccentric personality.

Yoo was married in 1992 and had one son. Yoo had previously been convicted 14 times of several different crimes, and had served a total of seven years in prison prior to the convictions for murder. During his incarceration, he reportedly started breaking crosses inside of his cell, stating that there was no God.

== Serial murders ==
From September to November 2003, Yoo killed several wealthy senior citizens by breaking into their houses and bludgeoning each of them with a hammer. To cover his tracks, he made the crime scenes look like robbery-homicides. However, no money was taken, which confused the police investigators. When the investigation started to intensify, Yoo switched to targeting female masseuses. In January 2004, Yoo was briefly arrested on a minor theft charge but was released two days later.

Starting in March 2004, Yoo called prostitutes to his residence in western Seoul and bludgeoned them after having sex with them. His victims were dismembered and mutilated to prevent their identification. They were buried in the mountains surrounding the city. Police recovered 11 bodies from the mountain behind Bongwon Temple after Yoo's arrest.

During initial interrogations, Yoo confessed to killing 19 people. On 18 July 2004, he admitted to an additional murder: the killing of a 44-year-old male street vendor. On 19 July 2004, Yoo revised his confession, admitting to a further six murders, raising his tally to 26 individuals, although no clarification or explanation was offered at that time. The list of purported victims included several individuals who did not match his prior pattern of wealthy seniors or masseuses. Friends of two of the masseuse victims, whose bodies had been recovered, claimed they were not involved in massage therapy, meaning that Yoo could have had other, unreported victims. Although the "Rainy Thursday" murderer was also active in April 2004, stabbing multiple women late at night in southwest Seoul, police were unable to link Yoo to those murders.

Several days later, Yoo also confessed to killing a young woman (a worker in a clothing store) on 6 February 2004 in Imun-dong after he suspected her of being a prostitute. Yoo had approached her for questioning by pretending to be a police officer. Approximately a month after his arrest, Yoo confessed to eating the flesh of his victims, although no evidence to prove this was offered.

=== Arrest for murder ===
Yoo was taken into custody on 15 July 2004 and confessed to murdering as many as 19 people initially, specifically targeting affluent senior citizens and masseuses. Yoo had raised suspicions by calling a massage parlour where several employees had recently gone missing after receiving similar phone calls, so the owner of the massage parlour, accompanied by several employees and a single police officer, went to the agreed-upon meeting place. The police officer left before Yoo arrived, and Yoo was apprehended by the employees of the massage parlor. Another police officer put handcuffs on Yoo after he was detained by the massage parlor employees.

While in custody, Yoo feigned epileptic symptoms and escaped from the police after his restraints were loosened. However, he was re-arrested 12 hours later. Yoo had attempted to escape after being arrested in 2002 for rape by faking an epileptic seizure.

The mother of the Imun-dong murder victim rushed at Yoo with an umbrella when he was brought to the prosecutor's office later in July, screaming that her daughter would still be alive if the police had captured him earlier. A policeman kicked the mother in the chest to subdue her, claiming that his hands were occupied by holding Yoo.

=== Motives ===
Based on the contents of his apartment, searched after his arrest, there was some speculation that he patterned his killings after several movies, including Public Enemy, Very Bad Things, and Normal Life. Yoo later confessed to being inspired by serial killer Jeong Du-yeong, who had murdered nine wealthy people in Busan from 1999 to 2000.

On the killing of wealthy older people, prosecutors stated that he killed them out of a hostility that originated from his own childhood poverty. Regarding Yoo's killing of women, prosecutors said his resentment stemmed from a lover who betrayed him, and he targeted women with jobs similar to those of his previous lover in a bid to retaliate. Yoo also told police he killed women because he hated them.

A psychologist who assessed Yoo concluded that he was not mentally ill, but exhibited the typical characteristics of anti-social disorder whereby a person creates their own belief system based on a rejection of moral and social norms.

=== Trial and penalty ===
Police admitted they had little physical evidence linking Yoo to the murders. Yoo first appeared in court on 6 September 2004, refusing to defend himself, declaring his intention to boycott the remainder of the trial and apologizing to the victims. Yoo boasted that he had no intention of stopping. When forced to return two weeks later, he lunged at the three presiding judges and recanted his confession for the February 2004 Imun-dong murder. He refused to appear at the next court session on 4 October 2004 after attempting suicide the night before. Yoo again disrupted a hearing three weeks later when he tried to attack a spectator who cursed at him, which ended with Yoo signing a statement pledging not to cause further commotion.

Prosecutors requested the death penalty, for which Yoo thanked them, and Yoo was sentenced to death on 13 December 2004 for 20 counts of murder (the count of murder for the woman in Imun-dong in February 2004 was thrown out). Prosecutors appealed the 21st murder count that the lower court had thrown out, but the lower court's decision was upheld on 8 June 2005 by the Supreme Court.

His case shocked the public and fueled a debate over capital punishment in South Korea. Although the death penalty is still permissible under law, it has not been employed since 1997. Support for capital punishment was so small prior to Yoo's arrest that it was on the verge of being outlawed, but it has grown since.

The Seoul Central District Court said, "Murders of as many as 20 people are unprecedented in the nation and constitute very serious crimes. The death penalty is inevitable for you in light of the enormous pains inflicted on the families concerned and on society."

Yoo is detained at the Seoul Detention Center. In the early days of his sentence at Seoul Detention Center, Yoo was not required to perform hard work, when food came in he ate the biggest and tastiest part, he knocked on the doors at 10 or 11 at night to harass the guards and made them boil water for his coffee, and acted recklessly. For this reason, he was beaten up by a group of gangsters. In November 2014, it was confirmed that he had been smuggling in Japanese comics, adult picture books, and erotic novels by bribing prison guards. He was transferred to the strict-surveillance Daegu Correctional Institution. In 2023, he was transferred back to Seoul Detention Center.

Professor Kwon Il-yong, a profiler, revealed that when he interviewed him, Yoo had mentioned Richard Chase (an American serial killer diagnosed with paranoid schizophrenia) and said, "Chase is mentally ill, but I am not."

== Murders ==
- First murder, 24 September 2003, Gangnam-gu, Seoul: University professor Lee Deok-su, 72, was stabbed in the neck with a knife. He and his wife, Lee Eun-ok, 67, were then beaten to death with a hammer (4 kg).
- Second murder, 9 October 2003, Jongno-gu, Seoul: Kang Eun-sun, 85, was bludgeoned to death with a hammer. Her daughter-in-law, Lee Sook-jin, 60, and her handicapped grandson, Go Jin-soo, 35, were killed in the same manner soon afterwards.
- Third murder, 16 October 2003, Gangnam-gu, Seoul: Yoo Joon-hee, 60, was beaten with a hammer. She was found by her son at 13:30 but died at 14:00.
- Fourth murder, 18 November 2003, Jongno-gu, Seoul: Yoo used his hammer to kill Kim Jong-seok, 87, and her housekeeper, Bae Ji-hye, 53. He then accidentally cut himself while attempting to open a safe, so he burned down the house to destroy the DNA evidence.
- On 11 December 2003, Yoo met a new girlfriend who was an escort, but she discovered his criminal record and told him not to contact her again. He then decided to kill escort girls as revenge.
- Fifth murder, 16 March 2004, Mapo-gu, Seoul: Yoo choked Kwon Jin-hee, 23, to death. He then cut her corpse into pieces and dumped them on a trail near Sogang University.
- Sixth murder, 13 April 2004, Mapo-gu, Seoul: Ahn Jae-sun, 44, a vendor who had scammed Yoo by giving him fake Viagra, was wrestled into his own van, handcuffed, and murdered. The next day, Yoo sawed the victim's hands off and disposed of them in a plastic bag. He then set the van on fire.
- Seventh murder, 5 May 2004, Mapo-gu, Seoul: Yoo lured 25-year-old Kim Hee-sun to his apartment and bludgeoned her with his hammer. He then smashed her head in, decapitated her in his bathroom, mutilated her body, and buried her remains near Bongwon Temple in Seodaemun-gu.
- Eighth murder, 7 May 2004, Mapo-gu, Seoul: Shin Min-a, 33, was killed in the same manner as the seventh victim.
- Ninth murder, 2 June 2004, Mapo-gu, Seoul: Han Sook-ja, 35, was killed in the same manner as the seventh victim.
- Tenth murder, 4 June 2004, Mapo-gu, Seoul: Chung Young-ae, 29, was killed in the same manner as the seventh victim.
- Eleventh murder, 9 June 2004, Mapo-gu, Seoul: Jang Kwang, 26, was killed in the same manner as the seventh victim.
- Twelfth murder, 18 June 2004, Mapo-gu, Seoul: Kim Ji-ho, 27, was killed in the same manner as the seventh victim.
- Thirteenth murder, 25 June 2004, Mapo-gu, Seoul: Woo Koo-yeon, 28, was killed in the same manner as the seventh victim.
- Fourteenth murder, 2 July 2004, Mapo-gu, Seoul: Kim Mi-young, 26, was killed in the same manner as the seventh victim.
- Fifteenth murder, 9 July 2004 (Aesongi escort), Mapo-gu, Seoul: Go Sun-hee, 24, was killed in the same manner as the seventh victim.
- Sixteenth murder, 13 July 2004 (Aesongi escort), Mapo-gu, Seoul: Im Mi-yeon, 27, was killed in the same manner as the seventh victim.
- At 5 am, 15 July 2004, Yoo was captured by police near Grand-mart in Mapo-gu, Seoul.

== In popular culture ==
- The Chaser (2008), a feature film loosely based on Yoo's story
- The Raincoat Killer: Chasing a Predator in Korea (2021), a Netflix original docuseries that recounts the hunt for Yoo
- Through the Darkness (2022), a TV series based on the 2018 non-fiction book of the same title co-written by South Korea's first criminal profiler Kwon Il-yong

== See also ==
- Kang Ho-sun
- List of incidents of cannibalism
- List of serial killers by country
- List of serial killers by number of victims
