= Kang Ho-sun =

South Korean serial killer (born 1969)

- Born: October 10, 1969 (age 57); Seocheon, South Korea
- Height: 171 cm (5 ft 7 in)
- Motive: Lust murder
- Convictions: Murder (10 counts); Rape; Arson
- Penalty: Death

Details
- Victims: 10
- Span of crimes: 2005–2008
- Location: Gyeonggi Province
- Date apprehended: January 27, 2009
- Imprisoned at: Seoul Detention Center

Kang Ho-sun (Korean: 강호순; Hanja: 姜浩順; born October 10, 1969) is a South Korean serial killer who was sentenced to death in 2009 for killing 10 women between October 2005 and December 2008, including his wife and her mother.

== Murders ==
The murders took place in Ansan, Gyeonggi Province, a suburb of Seoul. His first victim was a karaoke bar employee surnamed Bae, 45, followed by three others in 2007 including a 48-year-old housewife and a 21-year-old student from Suwon. Their bodies were found in the woods. Kang was arrested in 2009 and after two days of interrogation, he confessed to 10 murders. More of the victims' remains were discovered and identified using DNA evidence. The victims' families sued Kang for damages.

His crimes were depicted in the 2022 South Korean TV series, Through the Darkness.

== Trial and sentence ==
After confessing to the murders of 10 women, Kang was found guilty of rape, murder and arson and a court in Ansan sentenced him to death on April 22, 2009. While death by hanging remains on the country's statutes, an informal moratorium on the Korean death sentence has been in place since 1997.

== Confirmed victims ==
- Kang's wife, 29, and her mother, 60, on October 30, 2005
- Yoon Jung-hyun, 23, on September 7, 2006
- Bae Kyung-mi, 45, karaoke bar employee in Gunpo on December 14, 2006
- Park Sung-ah, 37, karaoke bar employee in Suwon on December 24, 2006
- Park Jung-ja, 52, office worker in Hwaseong on January 3, 2007
- Kim Hae-young, 37, karaoke bar employee in Anyang on January 6, 2007
- Yeon Mi-young, 21, university student in Suwon on January 7, 2007
- Kim Soo-hee, 48, housewife in Suwon on November 9, 2008
- Ahn Young-ok, 19, university student in Ansan on December 19, 2008

== Prison life ==
During his early days in prison, Kang acted arrogantly to fellow inmates and never seemed apologetic or remorseful, according to a prison official. Kang is said to have realized his status in prison only after Jeong Nam-gyu, a serial killer also on death row, died by suicide because of the shadow of the looming death penalty.

== See also ==
- Lee Choon-jae
- List of serial killers by country
- List of serial killers by number of victims
