= Seoul Detention Center =

Prison in Uiwang, South Korea

- Location within South Korea
- Location: Uiwang; 37.4°N 126.99°E
- Status: Operational
- Security class: Detention Center
- Population: 1500 (in medical section, 1990 report) (1990)
- Opened: July 1967
- Managed by: Korea Correctional Service

The Seoul Detention Center (Korean: 서울구치소; Hanja: 서울拘置所, alternatively Seoul Prison) is a prison in Uiwang, Gyeonggi Province, South Korea, operated by the Korea Correctional Service.

== History ==
The Detention Center was completed in July 1967.

According to a 1992 report by the Lawyers for Democratic Society, in 1990 the Detention Center had 1,500 prisoners in the medical section with only one full-time doctor, and prisoners frequently lacked necessary medical treatments.

== Operations ==
The Center houses an execution chamber, though a moratorium on executions in South Korea is in effect.

== Notable prisoners ==
=== Current ===
- Han Duck-soo: Former acting South Korean president. Serving a 15-year sentence.
- Yoo Young-chul: South Korean serial killer. Sentenced to death on December 13, 2004, awaiting execution.
- Yoon Suk Yeol: Former South Korean president. Serving a life sentence plus 37 years.

=== Former ===
- Roh Tae-woo: Former South Korean president
- Lee Jae-yong: Vice Chairman of Samsung Group
- Park Geun-hye: Former president of South Korea who was impeached and sentenced to prison for bribery, abuse of power, and other offenses.
- Kang Chang-gu: Serial killer, executed on April 17, 1990.
- Oen Bo-hyun: Spree killer, executed on November 2, 1995.
- Six members of the Chijon family, executed on November 2, 1995.
