= Chijon family =

South Korean serial killers

Chijon Family
- 지존파
- The Chijon Family in front of their weapons
- Founded: 1993
- Founded by: Kim Gi-hwan
- Founding location: South Korea
- Years active: 1993–1994
- Membership: 8
- Criminal activities: Murder, extortion, kidnapping, cannibalism, rape

- Chijon family
- Hangul: 지존파
- Hanja: 至尊派
- RR: Jijonpa
- MR: Chijonp'a

The Chijon Family (Korean: 지존파), also known as the Jijon Family, was a South Korean gang active between 1993 and 1994. The gang was founded by Kim Gi-hwan, a former convict, along with six other former prisoners and unemployed workers who shared his grudge against the wealthy. The name "Chijon" was given to the gang by prosecutors working on the case. Originally, Kim had named his gang Mascan, believing the word to be of Greek origin and to signify "ambition," although no Greek word with a similar meaning and pronunciation can be identified.

== Gang ==
=== Members ===
Kim Gi-hwan (김기환) was the leader of the gang. He was 26 years old (all ages mentioned here are in Korean age). He was reportedly the top student in his class and held an amateur 1-dan rank in Go. According to his report card, he frequently skipped school due to his family's financial problems. He left school in the first grade of middle school (age 13) because of these difficulties.

After leaving school, Kim moved to Busan and worked in a shoe factory or a plywood factory, and later moved to Seoul to do manual labor. His thoughts of committing heinous acts began after he watched news reports about corruption in university entrance exams. Kim was the first of the gang members to be arrested and convicted for raping his ex-friend's niece, and was sentenced to five years. The police at that time had not known that Kim already killed the gang's first victim.

Moon Sang-rok (문상록) - He was 23 at the time. Before joining the gang, he already had three prior convictions.

Kim Hyun-yang (김현양) - He was 22 at the time.

Kang Dong-un (강동운) - He was 21 at the time. Before joining the gang, he already had two prior convictions for special larceny.

Baek Byung-ok (백병옥) - He was 20 at the time. Before joining the gang, he had already committed two special robberies.

Kang Moon-sub (강문섭) - He was 20 at the time.

Song Bung-un (송붕운) - He was 18 at the time.

Lee Kyung-sook (이경숙) - She was 23 at the time. She joined the gang later than the other members. Before joining, she met one of the gang members, Kang Dong-un, at a coffee house. After they started dating, Kang paid off all of Lee's debts.

All the male members worked in construction sites or factories before joining the gang.

=== Formation ===
During the summer of 1993, Kim Gi-hwan met Moon Sang-rok and Kim Hyun-yang at a poker game. Kim Gi-hwan began expressing his hatred toward wealthy people, and the other two agreed. That evening, they decided to form a gang and establish a doctrine. Over the next few weeks, they approached workers at construction sites and persuaded them to join. They successfully convinced Kang Dong-un and Baek Byung-ok, both convicted robbers, as well as Kang Moon-sub and Song Bong-un, to join the gang.

Kim Gi-hwan asked all seven members to pool their finances. They used these funds to acquire two vehicles, walkie-talkies, dynamite, and 17 weapons, including six rifles, a submachine gun, a pistol, an air gun, a military sword, a hiking knife, and an electric prod. They also provided a small incineration facility and added three prison cells to its basement. Their plan was to collect one billion won (about $1,250,000 in 1993) through kidnapping and extortion targeting the wealthy.

Part of their training included hiking and camping on Jirisan, the second tallest mountain in South Korea. The more experienced members provided detailed lessons on handling dynamite and executing kidnappings.

=== Doctrine ===
Their doctrine was as follows:

1. 우리는 돈 많은 자들을 저주한다 (We hate the rich.)
2. 조직을 배신한 자는 반드시 죽인다 (A traitor to the group must be killed.)
3. 여자는 어머니도 믿지 말라 (Do not trust women, not even your mother.)

== Victims ==
Kim Gi-hwan's friend's niece - She was raped by Kim Gi-hwan, the gang leader, on June 17 (before the gang's first murder). This led to Kim's early arrest following the second murder.

Miss Choi - She was 20 years old at the time. On July 18, 1993, the gang abducted her under a train bridge, took her to a remote hill, and gang-raped her. They considered this an act of "practice" because the victim was not wealthy and was a farmer's daughter. According to a confession by Kim Hyun-yang, Kim Gi-hwan choked the victim and said, "This is how you kill a person." Miss Choi was murdered on July 18, 1993, at about 11:00 p.m. Her body was discovered by a villager who was cutting weeds. The police did not determine the motive or identify the murderers until much later when the gang made their confessions.

Song Bong-un - He was a member of the gang and was 18 years old at the time. He managed the gang's funds and escaped with 3 million won of their money. The remaining gang members found him hiding at a relative's house in Siheung (시흥) in August 1993. They took him to a secluded area about 4 km away from their incineration facility and killed him by shooting him in the head. They also killed and ate a dog at the same location. During their arrest, they assisted the police in locating Song's buried body.

Lee Jeong-su and boyfriend - Lee, a 27-year-old café worker, and her boyfriend, a 34-year-old musician, had been casually dating. On September 8, 1994, at around 3:00 a.m., the gang was wandering around motels in Yangsu-ri (양수리), having heard a rumor that these were popular destinations for the wealthy. Although neither of them was wealthy, the musician was driving a Hyundai Grandeur, which was considered a sign of wealth at the time. This led the gang to target the couple.

The gang pursued them, trapping the Grandeur with their pickup truck behind and their Daewoo LeMans in front. They used a gas gun to incapacitate the boyfriend, then stabbed him and began to beat both of them. Despite the Grandeur's alarm going off, there were no people around. They tied the couple with tape, took them to their incineration facility, and locked them in a cell. One member brought Lee milk and bread, but she refused to eat. He remarked, "You have to have known real hunger to know how precious each drop of milk is." It turned out that the gang had mistaken them for wealthy individuals.

The next night, the gang demanded a sum of money that the musician did not have. Upon confirming that he was not wealthy, they told him they would kill him "painlessly." They forced Lee to participate in the murder to ensure she could not escape or report them to the police. They made the musician drink liquor, then Lee placed plastic wrap over his head and suffocated him. Kim Hyun-yang persuaded the gang to spare Lee's life.

The gang then took the musician's body to a cliff, placed him in the driver's seat of his car, and pushed the car off the cliff. Prior to this, one of the gang members deliberately left skid marks from the Grandeur near the cliff. They also gang-raped Lee at the same location.

The musician's relatives reported his disappearance to the police. The following day, a construction worker discovered the car and the body. The police initially considered it an accident, and the presence of alcohol in the body led them to assume it was a case of drunk driving.

Mr. So and Mrs. Park - Mr. So, 42, owned a factory in Ulsan, but he and his wife, Park, lived in Seoul. It was reported that So had purchased the factory shortly before the incident. On September 13, 1994, just before the Chuseok holiday, So and Park were picking weeds from a family member's grave when the gang abducted them and took them to their incineration facility. The gang demanded 100 million won in cash from So. He informed them that while he did not have that amount, he could provide 80 million won, which was intended for factory workers and maintenance.

The gang kept So's wife as a hostage and sent him to obtain the money. So arranged for a worker to deliver the money. Although the worker reported the situation to the police in Ulsan, he was directed to report to Gwangju, where the money was handed over to So. At that time, it was common for police departments in South Korea to pass cases to different jurisdictions. In Gwangju, the police suspected the case was a ruse to cover up financial problems at the company.

Despite receiving the money, the gang forced Lee Jeong-su to shoot So and Park in the head with an air gun. They then ate parts of the bodies and forced Lee to consume the liver. To mask the smell of the incineration, the gang had a barbecue in front of the facility and even offered the pork barbecue to local villagers. One gang member later confessed to dismembering the victims and eating their flesh, claiming it was to boost his courage and renounce his humanity.

=== Rich list ===
Emboldened by a series of successful murders and kidnappings, the gang decided they needed a more effective way to identify wealthy victims. They acquired a mailing list from Seoul's exclusive Hyundai Department Store through a disgruntled worker. The list contained the names of the store's 1,200 best customers who paid with credit cards. The gang used this list to select their next victims. The department store worker was arrested after the gang was apprehended.

== Lee Jeong-su's escape ==
On September 16, 1994, the gang practiced throwing dynamite as part of their plan to free Kim Gi-hwan from prison. Both Kim Hyun-yang and Lee Jeong-su were burned during the practice and went to the hospital. Kim trusted Lee and left her responsible for 500,000 won in cash and Kang Dong-un's cell phone. In the waiting room, Kim asked her, "Do you want to run away? Do you want to escape? If you want to run away, then go ahead." She was unsure whether he was testing her or not. The gang had previously told her that there were thousands of members in the Chijon Family and that they could capture her no matter where she tried to escape.

The nurse called Kim into the room, providing Lee with an opportunity to escape. She took a taxi and then called for a rental car while hiding at a vineyard. The rental car drove her to Daejeon, where she took another taxi to Seoul. Too frightened to report to the police herself, she hid in a motel in Yeoksam-dong, Seoul. From there, she called a male friend to report the situation to the police on her behalf. He reported the incident to the Seocho Police Station. Later, she went to the police station herself.

Initially, the police did not believe Lee. They suspected she was under the influence of drugs and checked her for hypodermic needle marks but found none. However, the chief criminal investigator, Go Byung-cheon, realized that Lee was referring to the missing married couple, whose case had not yet been reported in the news. This led the police to take her seriously and initiate an investigation.

== Arrest and conviction ==
The gang had been monitoring the local police department. When they saw that no search was being conducted for them, they assumed that Lee Jeong-su had not reported them.

The police traced So's cell phone and found it in Yeonggwang County, which matched Lee's story.

In the early morning of September 17, 1994, the police went to Jangsu, where the musician's car had been pushed down the cliff. Although the local police were aware of the car, the officers from the Seocho District were not. After confirming the case's validity, the police waited at the apartment where gang member Kang Dong-un lived. They arrested him on September 19 when he arrived in a pickup truck. The police then contacted the rest of the gang, pretending to be at the hospital and claiming that Kang had been in a serious accident. This ruse led the gang members to the location, where they were subsequently arrested.

After the gang was arrested, the broker who had provided them with the weapons, particularly the illegal firearms, was also arrested. It is now nearly impossible for civilians to acquire firearms in South Korea.

=== Death sentences ===
On November 1, 1994, the Chijon Family members, except for Kang Dong-un's girlfriend, Lee Kyung-sook, who did not participate in any of the murders, were sentenced to death for the murders of five people. After the sentencing, none of the convicted murderers showed any remorse. Kim Hyun-yang told television reporters before his trial that his only regret was not having killed more wealthy individuals.

On November 2, 1995, all members of the Chijon Family, except for Lee Kyung-sook, were executed at Seoul Detention Center. Lee was convicted only of fleeing the scene of a crime.

== Copycat crimes ==
During their arrest and at a press conference, one of the gang members claimed that there were additional members still at large.

Due to the lack of information provided to the public at the time, it was widely assumed that all the victims were wealthy.

At the same time as the 1996 North Korean commandos infiltration incident, there was a South Korean nine-member copycat gang inspired by the Chijon Family. The copycat gang called themselves the Maggapa (막가파). The police arrested them on October 29, 1996.

== See also ==
- Capital punishment in South Korea
- List of incidents of cannibalism
- List of serial killers by country
