= Capital punishment in South Korea =

Capital punishment is a legal penalty in South Korea. As of August 2023, there were 59 people on death row in South Korea. The method of execution is hanging. However, there has been an informal moratorium on executions since President Kim Dae-jung took office in 1998. There have been no executions in the country since December 1997.

== History ==
Capital punishment was present in the legal system of the ancient Silla kingdom. It included the jokju/chokchu—sentencing a traitor and all of their relatives to the 9th degree. Also during the Joseon period (1392–1897), capital punishment was a legal penalty; the Joseon penal code was based on that of Ming dynasty China, with the primary method of execution being either decapitation or strangulation. In addition, lingchi, or "lingering death by slow-slicing" (neungji-cheocham, 능지처참), was reserved for particularly serious offences, while the forced consumption of a lethally-poisonous beverage (sasa, 사사), essentially forced suicide, was a leniency granted to royal offenders and others of high rank. The purpose of executions was mainly to make a statement to the people, essentially shocking the citizens into submission by not committing future crimes. In centuries past, the heads of executed people were displayed in public both to serve as a warning and to enforce military courtesy. However, the bodies of executed people were allowed funeral proceedings.

In contemporary history, the first execution law was established on March 25, 1895, by the Supreme Court of Judicature of Japan acting under the Constitution of the Empire of Japan. The first death sentence was given four days later, on March 29, 1895, to Jeon Bongjun, who was hanged on 24 April that year.

Currently, the Penal Code of South Korea regulates executions as a form of punishment for some crimes according to the Criminal Law section 41. Those crimes include: Rebellion (Section 87), Conspiracy with foreign countries (Section 92), homicide (Section 250), robbery-homicide (Section 338), and other 12 sections. People under 18 cannot be executed according to Juvenile Law (Section 59, Juvenile Law).

== Moratorium ==
In February 1998, then-president Kim Dae-jung enacted a moratorium on executions. This moratorium is still in effect as of 2025. Thus, executions in Korea are considered to be de facto abolished. The last executions took place on December 30, 1997, when 23 people (each of whom had murdered at least two people) were put to death. However, there are still 59 people with a death sentence as of 2023.

In 2010, the Constitutional Court of Korea ruled that capital punishment did not violate "human dignity and worth" in the Constitution of the Republic of Korea. In a five-to-four decision, capital punishment was upheld as constitutional. Institutions such as Amnesty International considered this a 'major setback for South Korea'.

Executions are still a matter of debate. People have called for executions for violent crimes, especially those involving rape of minors.

A 2017 poll found younger South Koreans are more likely to support capital punishment than older ones. People in their 20s were the most supportive at 62.6 percent.

According to a survey of 1,000 adults by the National Human Rights Commission of Korea in October 2018, 79.7% of the Korean citizens were supportive of the death penalty. When asked to select between life without parole and the death penalty, approximately 70% chose life imprisonment.

In 2021, Ipsos conducted a multinational online survey on capital punishment among 55 countries. The poll showed 74% of South Korea citizens favoring the death penalty, tied with Japan and more than any other of the surveyed countries, including the United States (67%).

A sentence of death is made extinct after 30 years. In 2023, the government proposed a law to remove the extinction period in response to the case of Won, Korea's longest-serving death-row inmate, who was convicted of arson and manslaughter in November 1993 and whose sentence would otherwise have been revoked.

== Notable cases ==
Kang Ho-sun was convicted of kidnapping and killing eight women between 2006 and 2008, and of burning to death his wife and mother-in-law in 2005. Kang, 38, was arrested in January for the murder of a female college student and later confessed to killing and secretly burying seven other women. Other death row inmates include Yoo Young-chul and members of the Chijon family, a former gang of cannibals.

In March 2010, in contrast to prior speculations, Minister Lee Kwi-nam hinted that the executions of death row inmates will resume, breaking the virtual 13-year moratorium. The remarks came a few days after Kim Kil-tae, who raped and murdered a 15-year-old schoolgirl, was convicted. However, this did not happen. In December 2010, Kim's death sentence was reduced to life imprisonment and the prosecutors did not appeal to the Supreme Court.

On August 27, 2015, the Supreme Court sentenced a man called 'Jang Jae-jin' to death for multiple murder and rape. On 27 November 2019, in the most recent case, a specially conducted jury trial, by a majority decision of 8–1, decided to sentence a 42-year-old man with schizophrenia named 'Ahn In-deuk' to death for committing mass arson and murder in a case which killed 5 people and injured 17 others in April of that same year. Although the man had schizophrenia, the Changwon District Court decided that he had shown a high level of premeditation and planning, as well as a lack of repentance from the defendant, his high possibility of reoffending and the tragedy he brought upon the victims and the five deceased's families.

On February 19, 2016, the Supreme Court upheld the death sentence passed on a man known by the surname 'Lim', a 24-year-old army sergeant who killed five fellow soldiers and injured seven others in a shooting rampage near the border with North Korea in 2014. He became the 61st person on death row in South Korea. According to Yonhap, of the 61 people on death row, 4, including Lim, were soldiers.

In June 2022, 53-year-old Kwon Jae-chan was sentenced to death for murdering two people, a woman in her fifties and a man in his forties. In January 2023, the Daejeon High Court allowed the prosecution's appeal and sentenced a 28-year-old to death after being convicted of the murder a 42-year-old fellow inmate at Gongju Correctional Institution, where the 28-year-old unnamed convict was already serving a sentence of life imprisonment for a 2019 robbery-murder case involving the theft of 400 grams of gold and a sedan. The High Court found the district court's sentencing of the 28-year-old to a second life term was pointless and that the killer, having shown no reformation despite being awarded a life sentence for his first homicide, should be given the harsher penalty of death to deter any future violence within South Korean prisons.
