= List of serial killers before 1900 =

The following is a list of individuals before 1900 that are reputed to fit the profile of a serial killer, which is a person that murders more than two individuals, in two or more separate events over a period of time, with the murders having a motive psychological gratification. Though many of these individuals committed their crimes pre-1900, the term "serial killer" is a 20th century term. This list does not include mass murderers, spree killers, war criminals, or figures in politics and government. This list is chronological by default, but can be re-ordered using the button at the top of each column.

== Table of serial killers before 1900 ==
Name	Country	Years active	Claimed victims	Notes
Unknown	Abbasid Caliphate	c. 871 and earlier	Unknown	An unnamed man from Karkh, Baghdad, strangled a number of women and buried them in his house. After his arrest, he was tortured to death; his remains were publicly displayed and later burned.
Gilles de Rais	(Kingdom of France) France	1432–1440	140+	French nobleman accused of torturing and murdering over 140 children. Rais and two accomplices in the murders were hanged on 26 October 1440.
Blaž Hrvat	Kingdom of Croatia	c. 1469	5	Tailor who was executed on the breaking wheel for murdering five people.
Pierre Burgot and Michel Verdun	(Kingdom of France) France	1521 and before	6	A pair of Frenchmen who confessed to killing and eating several children. They claimed to have committed the murders in wolf form after making a pact with a witch coven. Burned at the stake.
Kateřina of Komárov	(Kingdom of Bohemia) Bohemia	1529–1533	14–30+	Noblewoman who murdered serfs on the estates of her husband. Sentenced to life imprisonment in a tower in Prague Castle.
Peter Stumpp	Holy Roman Empire	c. 1564–1589	16	"The Werewolf of Bedburg". Confessed under torture to murdering and cannibalizing 14 children, including his son, and two pregnant women. Broken on the wheel, beheaded and burned.
Gilles Garnier	(Kingdom of France) France	1572	4	Hermit known as "The Werewolf of Dole". Confessed to strangling four children and eating their flesh. Garnier was caught attacking a young boy and burned at the stake in 1573.
Niklaus Stüller	Holy Roman Empire	c. 1577	4	Executed for shooting a cavalryman and disembowelling three pregnant women.
Unknown	Old Swiss Confederacy	1580 and earlier	16	Known as "The Werewolf of Geneva"; Unnamed man who murdered 16 children and ate their bodies in Geneva.
Elizabeth Báthory	Hungary	1585–1610	80–650	Known as "The Blood Countess"; tried for torturing servant girls to death. Accomplices were executed, and she was imprisoned until her death in 1614. The veracity has been disputed.
Nicolas Damont	(Kingdom of France) France	1598	50	A French tailor accused of killing and eating 50 children in Châlons-en-Champagne whose remains had been found in his house. The brutality of the crimes and the accused's repeated psychotic episodes led authorities to accuse him of being a werewolf. Burned at the stake.
Jacques Roulet	(Kingdom of France) France	1599 and earlier	Unknown	Alleged werewolf sentenced to death for murdering a 15-year-old. He also confessed to killing multiple other adults and children.
Jean Grenier	(Kingdom of France) France	1603	50	A French teenager and self-proclaimed werewolf, Jean confessed to killing and eating 50 children while in wolf form. At his trial, it was decided that Grenier was a weak-minded lunatic rather than a denizen of the devil. The court sentenced Grenier to life imprisonment at a monastery in Bourdeaux. Died in 1611.
Catalina de los Ríos y Lisperguer	(Spain) Spanish Chile	c. 1630 – c. 1660	40	Aristocrat nicknamed La Quintrala, possibly after the local red-flowered mistletoe (quintral) and because of her long red hair. Investigated for the deaths of 40 servants and slaves on her property but never tried or convicted. Died of natural causes in 1665.
Melchior Hedloff	Polish–Lithuanian Commonwealth	1648?–1653	251	The "Melcher Shooter". Highwayman and alleged cannibal who was known for killing his victims with a rifle and then mutilating the corpses with a Turkish saber. Captured 1653 and executed in 1654 after confessing to 251 murders.
The Bloody Innkeeper	England	1675 and earlier	7	The bodies of seven men and women were discovered in a garden.
Philip Herbert	England	1678–1680	3	Nobleman infamous for his drunkenness and violent outbursts, during which he killed several people.
Pavlo Shulzenko's gang	Cossack Hetmanate	1740 and earlier	Unknown	Gang led by Cossack Pavlo Shulzenko. He gang-raped and murdered multiple people and practiced cannibalism before being arrested in 1740. Four of the 16 members, including the leader, were arrested, but 12 were never arrested. On December 12, 1740, leader Pavlo Shulzenko was flogged, had his fingers, ears, and nose cut off, and was finally impaled and executed.
Darya Nikolayevna Saltykova	Russia	1755–1762	38–147	Aristocrat who beat and tortured female serfs to death. Sentenced to life in prison in 1768, where she died of natural causes in 1801.
Dorcas Kelly	(Kingdom of Ireland) Ireland	1761 and earlier	1–5	Also known as "Darkey Kelly". Dublin brothel owner hanged and burned at the stake for the murder of a client. According to dubious accounts published 27 years after her death, four skeletons were found in her establishment after her execution.
Luísa de Jesus	Portugal	1760s–1772	28–33	Baby farmer accused of having murdered 33 infants, taken from the "foundling wheel" in the town of Coimbra, Portugal. She only confessed to 28 of the homicides. Executed by garrote. She was the last woman executed in Portugal.
Unknown	(Kingdom of France) France	1769	3	Killed three men with a short sling within the span of six days in mid-October, before being arrested.
Aochababa	Tokugawa Shogunate	1771 and earlier	10+	Known as "Aochababa"; unnamed baby farmer who was beheaded for killing more than 10 babies. After the execution, their brain was dissected for research purposes by Sugita Genpaku, Maeno Ryōtaku and Katsuragawa Hoshū.
Paul Reininger	Austria	1779–1786	6	Known as "The Heart Eater of Kindberg"; A young farmer who believed that by eating the hearts of seven people he could acquire the ability to transform into an invisible person, so he killed five women and one girl and ate their hearts.
Unknown	Sweden	1784–1789	1–3	A maid confessed to murdering her three newborn children after giving birth between 1784 and 1789 in the village of Vanaja. The remains of her first baby were found in poor condition in a nearby forest. She was sentenced to death for the murder of her first child but acquitted of the other two due to lack of evidence.
Dai Matsugoro	Tokugawa shogunate	1792	50+	Known as "Aoi Kozō"; thief who robbed, raped, and murdered over 50 women. He was executed by beheading 10 days after his arrest.
Zhang Liangbi	Qing dynasty	1796–1812	11	Elderly man from Anhui who sexually mutilated 16 children, killing 11 of them. Executed via death by a thousand cuts around 1812.
Patty Cannon's gang	United States	1802–1829	4–400+	Kidnapped slaves and free blacks in the Delmarva Peninsula and sold them to slavers down south. Cannon, reportedly aroused by the sight of black males being beaten into submission, was arrested when four skeletons (three children, one male adult) were found buried in her property, though most of the gang's victims were probably rival white slavers. Cannon died in prison while awaiting trial, under unclear circumstances.
Saito Hiroemon	Tokugawa shogunate	1806	7	Between January and March, Hiroemon attacked 14 homeless and disabled people with a spear for the thrill of it, killing seven of them and injuring seven others. He once worked for a samurai, and during that time he learned how to use a spear, which eventually led him to develop a twisted interest in stabbing a living person, which became his motive for murder. He was arrested on suspicion of stealing merchandise from a store, and after being dragged around the city, he was executed by beheading on April 24.
Andreas Bichel	(Kingdom of Bavaria) Bavaria	1806?–1808	2–50+	"The Bavarian Ripper". Invited young women into his house under the pretense of showing them a "magic mirror" where they could see their future husbands. He blindfolded them and bound their hands behind their backs, which he said was necessary for the ritual, and then hit them in the head, stabbed them in the neck and hacked them to pieces with an axe while they were still alive, burying their bodies in the mountains or under the woodshed in his own home. He kept his victims' clothing, which ended up incriminating him. Sentenced to break at the wheel, later changed to decapitation, and executed in 1809.
John Brown and Richard Lemon	(United Kingdom) New South Wales	1807–1808	5–9	Bushrangers fugitive of a British penal colony in the Tamar Valley who murdered three soldiers, a fellow fugitive and at least one Aboriginal Tasmanian. Lemon was killed by bounty hunters in 1808, who also captured Brown. Brown was taken to Sydney, where he was hanged.
John Williams	United Kingdom	1811	7	Irish sailor who murdered two families and their servants in London's East End by bashing their heads with a hammer and cutting their throats. Hanged himself in prison while awaiting trial.
Konstantin Sazonov	Russia	1814–1816	6–7	Servitor at Tsarskoye Selo Lyceum. He killed six or seven people between 1814 and 1816.
Juan Severino Mallari	(Spain) Spanish Philippines	1816–1826	57 (as confessed)	Mallari was a Filipino Catholic priest during the Spanish colonial period from Barangay San Nicolas in the town of Magalang, Pampanga. He became the parish priest of Magalang, Pampanga, in 1816 and believed that his mother was hexed (kulam is the local Filipino term), which became his motive for the killings. He believed killing people could cure his mother's ailments. It is possible that around this time, Mallari's peers noticed signs of his mental instability. The Spanish colonial government executed Mallari by hanging.
Olga Briscorn	Russia	1818–1822	121+	Russian landowner who tortured and murdered an unknown number of her serfs.
Francisco Rondán Rodríguez	(Spain) Spanish Cuba	1820s	Unknown	Committed murders in collusion with an unnamed barber.
Alexander Pearce	(United Kingdom) Australia	1822–1823	2–5	Irishman deported in 1819 to Tasmania. He escaped the convict settlement with seven other convicts in 1824 into the Bush. The group was led by Robert Greenhill because he was the only one with a weapon, the axe used to kill members of the party for food when starvation ensued (ironically, in a region abundant with edible plants and other bush tuckers). After the first such murder for survival (unlikely to have been committed by the undersized, weaponless Pearce), 3 of the seven decamped. Pearce escaped being the second of the party murdered for food before one of the remaining three was fatally bitten by a snake. Only Pearce and Greenhill remained. Pearce was the only one left alive to reach the eastern settlements. Pearce was recaptured and sent back to the Macquaire Harbor convict settlement as his claims of murder and cannibalism weren't believed, and escaped soon after with another convict, Thomas Cox. This time Pearce killed and ate his companion in less than ten days, when he surrendered voluntarily to the authorities. It is difficult to justify calling Pearce a serial killer, as he only killed two people on his own and was at most one of Greenhill's accomplices in two earlier survival murders. However, if more than fictional sensationalism to sell newspapers, his reported last words, "Man's flesh is delicious. It tastes far better than fish or pork" suggest he may have become one had he lived. Hanged in 1824.
William Burke and William Hare	United Kingdom	1828	16	Lured, intoxicated and murdered people to sell their bodies to Dr. Robert Knox, who used them in his anatomy classes at Edinburgh Medical School. Their usual method was compressing the chests of the victims in a process thenceforth known as "burking". Hare was given immunity in exchange for testifying against Burke, who was hanged in 1829, while Knox was never prosecuted. Burke's fiancée was also tried, but her implication was found not proven.
François Marois	(United Kingdom) Canada	1829 and earlier	1–13+?	Known as "Indian doctor"; doctor hanged in Quebec for murdering a peddler in 1829; 12 burned bodies were found in his home 30 years after his death.
Charles Broughton and Matthew McAvoy	(United Kingdom) Van Diemen's Land	1830	3	Escapees of Macquaire Harbor who butchered and cannibalized three fellow convicts. Surrendered to authorities after a month and were hanged.
Ilya Kodyma	Russia	1830s	57	Known as "The Odessa Jack The Ripper" or "Lone wolf"; Murdered 57 people, including prostitutes, and tore out their internal organs. death sentence was handed down, but it was commuted to twenty years of hard labor on the grounds of mental illness.
John Bishop and Thomas Williams	United Kingdom	1831	3	Called the "London Burkers". Copycats of Burke and Hare that were active in London. Hanged.
Delphine LaLaurie	United States	1831–1834	2–4	New Orleans socialite who tortured and maimed slaves. Seven chained and mutilated slaves were rescued after a fire broke out in LaLaurie's mansion, of which two died of their injuries shortly after, and three buried skeletons were later discovered on her property (according to witnesses, one had died in an accident). The case caused outrage in Louisiana, but LaLaurie fled to France and was never prosecuted. Died of natural causes between 1842 and 1849.
Seine-Maritime Killers	France	1831–1837	6	Toussaint Fournier, his brother François Fournier, his father Nicolas Fournier, and his brother-in-law Napoléon Godry murdered one person in August 1831, three people in the rectory on October 16, 1836, and a priest and his daughter on November 20, 1837.
Giorgio Orsolano	(Kingdom of Sardinia) Piedmont-Sardinia	1832–1835	3	"The Hyena of San Giorgio". Raped, butchered and cannibalized three girls aged nine to fourteen, burying their remains in the country or throwing them in a river. Hanged.
Honorine Pellois	France	June 16 to 19, 1834	2	Girl who, at only 10 years old, drowned two girls, both two years old, throwing them into a water well, in the town of Bellême, Orne. She confessed that she killed the girls because they were "prettier" than her. She was sentenced to 20 years in prison.
John Lynch	(United Kingdom) New South Wales	1835–1841	9–10	"The Berrima Axe Murderer". Irish convict turned bushranger who killed his victims with a single hatchet blow to the back of the head. His acquittal at a murder trial in 1835, while his two accomplices were hanged, had convinced him that God approved of his crimes. Hanged in 1842.
Manuel Blanco Romasanta	Spain	1844–1852	9–14	"The Werewolf of Allariz". While on the run from his first murder (a constable killed over a debt), Romasanta assumed a new identity and offered his services as a mountain guide to women and children, whom he murdered, later selling their clothing (and according to rumor, also making soap made from their body fat). Following his arrest, he confessed to 13 murders, which he claimed were committed involuntarily during his transformation into a wolf as a result of a curse. He was found guilty of nine and sentenced to die by garrote. This was changed to life in prison following a petition by doctors who wished to study him further. He died in jail in 1863.
Hendrikje Doelen	Netherlands	1845–1846	3	Killed her husband, an old woman who was living with the couple, and her daughter with arsenic. Died in prison after 8 days of detention.
Swiatek	(Kingdom of Galicia and Lodomeria) Galicia and Lodomeria	1846–1849	6–14+	According to a book by Sabine Baring-Gould, Swiatek was a homeless beggar who murdered and cannibalized a 14-year-old girl in 1849. After his arrest, he admitted to killing and eating five other people, and evidence was found linking him to at least 14 murders. Committed suicide before trial.
Andreas Hall	United States	1847–1848	2–3	Burglar and arsonist hanged in March 1849 for the murder of a couple in Petersburgh, New York. Confessed to an additional murder and other crimes before his execution.
Juhani Aataminpoika	(Russia) Finland	1849	12	Serial killer, who murdered 12 people in southern Finland between October and November in 1849, and he was also known by the nickname "Kerpeikkari", which means 'executioner'. He was initially sentenced to death, but the sentence was changed by order of the Emperor to 40 lashes and life imprisonment in Sveaborg. He has been characterized as the first serial killer in Finland.
Antonio Boggia	Lombardy-Venetia	1849–1859	4	Called "The Monster of Milan" and "The Monster of Bagnera Street". Killed and dismembered three men and one woman with an axe, then feigned documents where the victims named him manager of their possessions in their absence. Before the discovery of the murders, he was briefly committed to a mental asylum for attacking a fourth man, who managed to escape. Hanged in 1862.
Franklin B. Evans	United States	1850–1872	2–7	Pedophile and sadist; was convicted of one child murder, that of his niece Georgianna Lovering, confessed to another and was suspected in four more killings. Reportedly claimed involvement in seven murders but only gave details of two. Hanged.
Ane Cathrine Andersdatter	Denmark	1853–1861	3	Murdered three of her children between 1853 and 1861. Executed in December 1861. Last woman to be beheaded in Denmark.
Vila Vicosa baby farmer	Portugal	1854 and before	9	Baby farmer arrested for the murder of nine illegitimate baby children, it is known that this woman received them and later killed them.
Martin Dumollard	France	1855–1861	3–30+	Lured women to Lyon with promises of work and then killed them. Tried and guillotined in 1862. His wife, Marie-Anne Martinet, was found guilty of assisting him and sentenced to 20 years of hard labor in a women's prison. She died in 1875.
Mary Jane Jackson	United States; Confederate States	1856–1861	4	New Orleans prostitute nicknamed "Bricktop" for her red hair. She clubbed one man to death and stabbed three others. The last one was John Miller, her boyfriend and a former prison guard whom she met while in remand for the third murder (the charges for which would be dropped without trial). Imprisoned for Miller's murder, she was let go less than one year later when Union troops seized the city and military governor George Shepley emptied the prisons, and left New Orleans.
Malachi Martin	(United Kingdom) Australia	1856–1862	2–5	Convicted of the murder of Jane Macmanamin, held legally responsible for another murder, and suspected in the disappearance of two travellers and the alleged murder of an unidentified indigenous child. Hanged in 1862.
Joseph Riaud	France	1860–1875	1–3	Convicted of murdering his third wife and was suspected in the deaths of his two previous wives. Executed by guillotine in January 1876.
Sε□αkmän˙a	(United Kingdom) British Columbia	c. 1860s	3+	Nuxalk hunter who lured others to their deaths and sold their goods to the Hudson's Bay Company. When asked why he murdered so continuously and so frequently, he claimed that "it was involuntary, his parents having smeared him with ashes from a wasp's nest when an infant". He is also said to have killed for favors. Nuxalk chief and clan officials executed him by shooting.
Thomas D. Carr	United States	1860s–1869	1–15	Carr murdered a teenage girl named Louisa Fox in 1869, for which he was sentenced to death. Before his execution in 1870, he admitted to 14 other murders, although many of his statements were of dubious accuracy.
Kobata Matsu	Tokugawa Shogunate; Japan	c. 1860s – c. 1872	23	Baby farmer who strangled 23 babies to death in Tenma, Osaka.
Parkmount Murders	(United Kingdom) Australia	1862–1867	3	Unidentified Tasmanian serial killer who killed three people, two being a double murder that occurred in 1862 and was thought to be a murder case in which the perpetrator killed the victim and then committed suicide.
Anders Lindbäck	Sweden	1864	3	Swedish vicar who murdered three people in 1864. Arrested in March 1865 and committed suicide in prison eight months later.
Marie-Françoise Bougaran	France	1865	3	Teenage maid, who between 12 and 26 November 1865, murdered three children of a family she worked for as a maid. In each case, she forced the children to swallow excrement, broke their limbs, and finally murdered them via suffocation or cutting the veins of their necks with a knife. After attempting to murder a fourth child, she was arrested, and later sentenced to 20 years imprisonment. In 1875, she died at the age of 24.
Jean-Charles-Alphonse Avinain	France	1867	2	Known as the "Terror of Gonesse"; executed by guillotine in November 1867.
Joseph Eisele	United States	1867	3	German-born immigrant who murdered three people and attempted to kill a fourth over a seven-month period in 1867. Hanged in 1868.
Joseph LaPage	(United Kingdom) Canada	1867–1875	2–4	Rapist, ephebophile and necrophile who murdered young women and girls and abused their corpses. Hanged in 1878.
Victor Prévost	France	1867–1879	2–4	Former butcher and policeman known as "The Butcher of the Chapel". Was charged with the murders of two people, with an additional two murders suspected. Killed his victims for profit via blunt force trauma before disemboweling them. Later executed via guillotine on 19 January 1880.
Matti Haapoja	(Russia) Grand Duchy of Finland (Russia) Russian Empire	1867–1894	3–10	Known to have killed three in Finland and suspected of seven more murders, five of them in Siberia, to which he had been exiled in the 1880s. Also wounded six people. Killed himself in prison in 1895.
Thomas Williamson	United States	1868–1890	4	Sentenced to death for a murder in Illinois in 1868. After his sentence was commuted, he moved to Missouri, where he killed his wife and two men. Executed in 1891.
"Wild" Bill Longley	United States	1869–1878	32	Racist gunfighter who claimed to have killed 32 people, most of whom were unarmed blacks and Mexicans. Hanged for the murder of a childhood friend.
Margaret Waters	United Kingdom	1870 and earlier	19	Baby farmer who drugged and starved children in her care. Convicted of one murder and hanged.
Charles Kennedy	United States	1870 and before	3–14	Lured travellers to his rest stop and murdered them for their valuables, and also murdered his son for accidentally revealing his crimes to an intended victim. Lynched before trial at the instigation of Clay Allison.
Juan Díaz de Garayo	Spain	1870–1879	6	Known as El Sacamantecas ("The Fat Extractor"). Strangled women after having sex with them—first willingly, then by force. Garroted in 1881.
Jesse Pomeroy	United States	1871–1874	2	Called "The Boy Fiend" and "The Inhuman Scamp". Beginning at age 12, he lured younger children and tortured them for his sexual pleasure, killing two. Youngest person sentenced to death by the state of Massachusetts, later changed to life in prison under solitary confinement, which was only lifted in 1917. Died in prison in 1932 of natural causes.
Eusebius Pieydagnelle	France	1872 and earlier	6–7	Claimed to have a sexual obsession with blood, having orgasms at the sight and smell of it. His victims were extremely mutilated.
The Bloody Benders	United States	1872–1873	10–12	Family of four who owned an inn and small general store in Labette County in southeastern Kansas from 1871 to 1873. They murdered around 11 clients, using a mallet and a knife to rob them. They fled when their crimes were discovered. Their fate is unknown, although two members of the posse that found the bodies made deathbed confessions decades later where they claimed to have tracked down and murdered the family.
Thomas W. Piper	United States	1873–1875	7	The "Boston Belfry Murderer". Church bellringer who battered, strangled and sometimes raped girls, the youngest being five. Hanged in 1876.
Callisto Grandi	(Kingdom of Italy) Italy	1873–1875	4	"The Child Killer"; carter who murdered four children in Florence because they made fun of him. Sentenced to 20 years imprisonment and later incarcerated in an asylum, where he died in 1911.
Augustine-Marie Ouvrard	France	August 23 to September 19, 1875	2	She suffocated two little girls, daughters of the couple for which she worked as a domestic worker. The first was a 20-month-old girl, Joséphine-Henriette Lerat, who died on August 23, 1875. The second was a 3-year-old girl, Marie Lerat, who died 26 days later. She confessed that she killed them because her job bored her and she didn't like it. Secluded until the age of 20 in a reformatory.
Stephen D. Richards	United States	1876–1878	6–9+	"The Nebraska Fiend". Confessed to killing four men, one woman, and her three children. Hanged in 1879.
Robert Francis Burns	(United Kingdom) Australia	1877–1881	8	Burns was hanged in 1883 for the murder of co-worker Michael Quinlivan. Just before his execution, he admitted that he had in fact committed eight murders during his lifetime, although he gave no further details. Seven of these victims, including Quinlivan, were subsequently identified.
Bochum Serial Sex Murderer	German Empire	1878–1882	8	Raped, strangled and mutilated women walking or working alone in the country. Wilhelm Schiff was found guilty of three murders and beheaded in January 1882, but the crimes continued until May of that year. Moral panic over the serial killings contributed to the full restoration of capital punishment in the German states by 1885, after a hiatus of ten to fifteen years.
Swift Runner	(United Kingdom) Canada	1879	9	Known as "Swift Runner". Cree executed in December 1879 in what is now the Canadian province of Alberta after the murder and cannibalizations of his wife, six children, mother, and brother. He believed he was a Wendigo, a creature from North American folk lore.
Amelia Dyer	United Kingdom	1879–1896	6–400+	Baby farmer who strangled the babies in her care. Hanged.
Edward Soper	United States	1880–1897	1–5	Murdered his wife and two daughters in Archie, Missouri, in 1895. Confessed to a total of five murders, beginning with his father in 1880. Hanged in 1899.
Francisco Guerrero	Mexico	1880–1908	21	Known as El Chalequero ("The Vests Man"). An open misogynist, between 1880 and 1888, he raped and killed 20 women in Mexico City, often claimed to be prostitutes, strangling them or cutting their throats, and in some cases also decapitating them. He then threw their bodies in the Consulado River. Tried for one murder and another attempt, his initial death sentence was changed to 20 years in prison, and was pardoned in 1904. In 1908, he raped and murdered an old woman and was again given the death penalty, but died in prison of natural causes before he could be executed. Guerrero predates Jack the Ripper by eight years.
Sava Jovanov Vujačić	Principality of Montenegro	1881–1887	7	Murdered seven people over six years. Executed by hanging.
West Ham Child Killer	United Kingdom	1881–1890	4	Responsible for the "West Ham Vanishings", in which four young girls were abducted and presumed murdered in similar circumstances in the West Ham area. The bodies of two victims, Clara Sutton and Amelia Jeffs, were recovered. The perpetrator was never identified.
Émile Dubois	France; Bolivia; Chile	1882–1905	6	French criminal and murderer who killed six people in three different countries. He was captured in 1905 and, after a trial, found guilty of the murders committed in Chile and executed by four riflemen on 26 March 1907.
Ah Young	United States	1883 and earlier	1–17	Chinese immigrant hanged for shooting and killing fellow countrymen in Montana. He is suspected of killing 15 Chinese people and two white people, including his compatriots. His execution was the first execution of a Chinese national in Montana.
Hugo Schenk	(Austria-Hungary) Austria	1883	4–6	Schenk and accomplice Karl Schlossarek were hanged for four counts of murder in 1884. They would lure housemaids into isolated areas and rob and rape them before weighting them down rivers or gorges with stones.
John Frank Hickey	United States	1883–1911	3	Known as "The Postcard Killer"; murdered three people and sent postcards to police and media. Sentenced to life in prison and died in 1922.
Ushitaro Nakauchi	Japan	1884–1921	7–9	He murdered two people in 1884, but was found not guilty because it was self-defense. He committed murder in 1885 and was sentenced to prison, and was later sentenced to life imprisonment for murdering a prison guard but was released on pardon. After his release, he was charged with killing five infants through baby farming and sentenced to death; executed by hanging in 1922.
Servant Girl Annihilator	United States	1884–1885	8	Unidentified killer, also nicknamed "The Austin Axe Murderer". Abducted women from their bedrooms at night, raped and killed them, hitting them with an axe or stabbing them with a knife or other iron implement, always in the head. Two husbands sleeping with their wives were dispatched first with a single strike from an axe (one died), but children, when present, were usually not harmed. The first five women targeted were black servants sleeping in cabins; the last two were white women in houses. Some sources name Nathan Elgin (1866–1886), an African-American cook shot by police while he was assaulting a girl, as the likely culprit.
Mária Orbán Juhász	Austria-Hungary	1885	Unknown	"Baby farmer" who abandoned and left an unknown number of babies to starve to death during the 1880s in Pest. She was sentenced to three months in prison for minor offenses.
The Kelly Family	United States	1887	11+	The Kelly Family was a family of serial killers who operated near a Kansas town called Oak City between August and December 1887. The family consisted of William Kelly (55); his wife Kate; his son Bill, also called 'Billy' (20); and his daughter, Kit (18). Originally from Pennsylvania, the family is believed to have murdered 11 wealthy travelers, akin to the Bloody Benders a decade earlier. Killed by vigilantes.
Thames Torso Murderer	United Kingdom	1887–1889	4	Unidentified killer who left the dismembered remains of victims in or near the Thames River.
Guadalupe Martínez de Bejarano	Mexico	1887–1892	3	Tortured three servant girls until they died of starvation. Died in prison.
T. J. Hampton	United States	1887–1893	2–5	Hanged in 1901 for the murders of two men in Fort White, Florida. Confessed to an additional three on the day of his execution.
Marie Célina Doiselet	France	June 23 to July 23, 1888	2	She suffocated two small children from the couple for whom she worked as a nanny, in Bar-sur-Aube. The first was six-month-old Paul Caramenti who died on June 23, 1888. The second two-year-old Louis Caramenti, died a month later. She confessed that she killed the children because she no longer wanted her job as a babysitter; Sentenced to 20 years in prison.
Albert Smidt	(United Kingdom) New South Wales	1888–1890	3+	A German immigrant who murdered at least three travelling companions from 1888 to 1890, before execution in 1890. Also known as "The Wagga Murderer".
Jack the Ripper	United Kingdom	1888–1891?	5–11	Unidentified killer who stabbed at least five prostitutes and mutilated four in the Whitechapel and Spitalfields districts of London. Several suspects have been named over the years.
Pleasant Pruitt	United States	1888–1902	3	Murdered three wives. Committed suicide after the last.
Minnie Dean	(United Kingdom) New Zealand	1889?–1895	3+	Baby farmer hanged for the murder of three infants that were found buried on her property. Only woman executed in the history of New Zealand.
Andrés Aldije Monmejá and José Muñoz Lopera	Spain	1889–1904	6	Monmejá (a native of Agen, France) and Lopera opened an illegal gambling house and murdered six visitors between 1889 and 1904. Both executed by garrote on October 31, 1906.
Tadeo Mejía	Mexico	1890s–1900s	Unknown	After the death of his wife, Mejía consulted a witch, who instructed him to murder for the purpose of human sacrifice. Human bones were found in his basement, although the exact number of his victims remains unknown.
Marianna Skublińska	Russia	1890 and earlier	50–75	A Russian baby farmer who was arrested after a fire at her nursery was extinguished, revealing the dead bodies of at least 50 babies concealed at various points around the house. Police suspected her of having disposed of up to 75 babies. She could not be convicted due to a lack of evidence but was sentenced to penal servitude for allegedly burning the house down for insurance.
Gustav Müller	Netherlands	1890–1897	2–18+	Bigamist who surrendered himself to police and confessed to the murders of his son, numerous wives, and parents. Only two murders (those of his son and his most recent wife) were proven. Declared insane and sent to a mental institution, where he presumably later died.
H. H. Holmes	United States (United Kingdom) Canada	1891–1894	1–9	Holmes was convicted and sentenced to death for the murder of his accomplice and business partner, Benjamin Pitezel. It is believed he killed three of the Pitezel children, as well as three mistresses, the child of one of the said mistresses and the sister of another.
Franz and Rosalie Schneider	(Austria-Hungary) Austria	1891	3–6	Married couple who lured women, robbed them, and then sexually assaulted or murdered them. They were convicted of three murders, but evidence suggests a total of six victims.
Frederick Bailey Deeming	United Kingdom; Victoria	1891	6	Killed his wife and four children (cutting their throats, except one daughter who was strangled) and buried their bodies in concrete under a rented house in Rainhill, England. He then fled with his mistress to Windsor, Victoria, where he bludgeoned her, cut her throat, and buried the body in concrete in another rented house. The discovery of the last body led to his arrest and the uncovering of the ones in Rainhill, attracting the attention of the international press, which considered him the possible identity of Jack the Ripper. Hanged in 1892.
John and Sarah Makin	(United Kingdom) New South Wales	1892 and earlier	12–13	Baby farmers who murdered infants in their care. John was hanged in 1893, but Sarah's death sentence was commuted to life imprisonment and hard labor. She was paroled in 1911 and died seven years later of natural causes.
Luigi Richetto	France	1893–1899	2–4	Murdered and dismembered four people in Lyon between 1893 and 1899. Sentenced to life imprisonment on the Salvation Islands in French Guiana.
Lizzie Halliday	United States (United Kingdom) Ireland (alleged)	1893?–1906	5–8	"The Worst Woman on Earth". Acquitted of killing her stepson by burning down their New York family home in 1893. After her husband disappeared the following year, a search of their farm found the bodies of two women in the hayloft who had been shot to death; the husband's mutilated body was found under the floorboards of the house a few days later. Halliday was convicted of the murders, becoming the first woman sentenced to die on the electric chair, but her sentence was later commuted to being interned in an asylum after she was found to be insane. In 1906, she killed an asylum's nurse with a pair of scissors. Another stepson claimed that Halliday had confided to him that she had murdered a previous husband in Belfast but had concealed the crime successfully. Died in 1918.
Frances Knorr	(United Kingdom) Victoria	c. 1894	2	Baby farmer hanged for the murder of two babies that were found buried on her property.
Harry T. Hayward	United States	1894 and earlier	1–4	"The Minneapolis Svengali". Gambler and serial arsonist who confessed to three other unreported murders after being found guilty of one. Hanged in 1895.
Diogo Figueira da Rocha	Brazil	1894–1897	50+	Brazilian career criminal and serial killer acting within São Paulo at the end of the 19th century. He is supposedly responsible for more than 50 murders between 1894 and 1897. Tucked away in the far west of the state, he was hunted down by government task forces and was pronounced dead in 1897 after a shootout with the authorities on the banks of the Mojiguaçu River. The corpse, however, has never been recovered.
Joseph Vacher	France	1894–1897	11–27+	Mentally ill vagrant known as "The French Ripper" and the "Ripper of the South-East", although he was also active in central and northern France. Raped, stabbed and disembowelled women, teenage boys and girls, who worked alone in the countryside. Guillotined in 1898.
Alfred Knapp	United States	1894–1902	5+	Murdered at least five women and girls in Ohio and Indiana. Executed in August 1904.
Denver Strangler	United States	1894–1903	3–5	Unidentified serial killer who operated in Denver, Colorado. He murdered three prostitutes in a 10-week span in 1894 and was suspected of two later murders.
Schultz (given name unknown)	German Empire (Germany) Weimar Republic	1894–1920	11	Random slayer active in Spandau. Victims included his two brothers-in-law.
Theodore Durrant	United States	1895	2	"The Demon of the Belfry". San Francisco Sunday school teacher who raped and strangled two women who rebuffed his romantic advances, then abandoned their bodies in the church's library and bell chamber. Took part in the search for the first victim and suggested that she had been kidnapped and taken out of town. Hanged in 1898.
Cayetano Domingo Grossi	Argentina	1896–1898	5	The first known serial killer in Argentine history. Italian immigrant who murdered five of his own neonatal children, who had been born as the result of his rape of his two stepdaughters. Executed by firing squad in Buenos Aires in 1900.
Edward Walton	United States	1896–1908	5	Confessed the murders of two men and three women in five different states, including his common-law wife. Hanged at Moundsville Penitentiary in West Virginia on July 17, 1908.
John Robinson	United States	1896–1913	3	Sentenced to 15 years of imprisonment for murdering his girlfriend in St. Louis, Missouri. After his release, he killed his wife and stepdaughter in Kansas City in 1913. Hanged in 1915.
Ludwig Tessnow	German Empire	1898–1901	4	Murdered four prepubescent children in two separate attacks in 1898 and 1901. Executed by guillotine in 1904.
Keijiro Nagai and Gen Nagai	Japan	19th century–1910	40–56+	Baby farmer couple who murdered dozens of infants before being arrested in 1910.
Martin Stickles	United States	1899–1900	3	Known as "The Kelso Killer"; murdered three people in Cowlitz County, Washington. Executed in January 1901.
The Angelmakers of Kristiania	Norway	1899–1900	19	Five baby farmers—Pauline Olsen, Anna Mathea Johansen, Martha Kristine Andresen, Severine Pettersen Hochst, and Karoline Mathilde Vennerskoug—adopted and murdered 19 foster children, leaving only two survivors.

== Unconfirmed serial killers ==
The existence of the following serial killers is dubious or contradicts the accepted historical record:

Name	Country	Years active	Notes
Walpurga Hausmännin	Holy Roman Empire	1556–1575	Midwife who was accused of witchcraft. She confessed under torture to murdering 40 babies, and partaking in blood-sucking and black magic. She is believed to be a victim of scapegoating.
Sawney Bean's clan	Scotland	1575–1600	Claimed cannibal family that robbed, killed and ate travellers in a cave at Bennane Head until their manhunt and execution by James VI. Contemporary documents make no reference to the hundreds of disappearances and murders said to have been carried out by Bean's clan, which was probably inspired by the earlier legend of Christie-Cleek.
Don Vincente	Spain	1834–1836	Bibliomaniac ex-monk and librarian said to have killed ten men in Barcelona in order to steal unique books and add them to his collection, sentenced for his crimes to die by garrote. The story, first published as an anonymous article in an 1836 Parisian newspaper, was reprinted as a true story in France for a century, while remaining largely unknown in Spain.
Matthias Schambacher (or Schaumboch)	United States	1850–1879	Tavern owner in the Blue Mountains who local legend claims was long suspected of murdering some of his guests for their money. Allegedly confessed to at least 11 murders before dying from natural causes in 1879. No record of such crimes can be found before 1938, when Maurice Broun compiled local legends about Schambacher while serving as curator of Hawk Mountain Sanctuary.
Agnus McVee, Jim McVee and Al Riley	(United Kingdom) Canada	1875–1885	Family claimed to have owned a hotel and store on the Cariboo Road of British Columbia during the Cariboo Gold Rush, where they killed miners for their gold and kidnapped women and forced them into sex trafficking against their will until their arrest and death in prison in New Westminster. The story comes from a single source, and there are no records of disappearances in the area at the time of the murders or existing death certificates of the supposed serial killers apprehended.
The Managua Ripper	Nicaragua	1889	Also called "The Managua Killer". Alleged unidentified serial killer who murdered and mutilated six prostitutes in the periphery of Managua. In 2005, Trevor Marriott proposed that the Managua Killer and Jack the Ripper were one and the same, a merchant sailor that worked on the route between Britain and the Caribbean.

== See also ==
- List of serial killers by country
- List of serial killers by number of victims
