= Callisto Grandi =

Italian serial killer

- Born: 1849; Incisa in Val d'Arno, Grand Duchy of Tuscany
- Died: 1911 (aged 61–62); San Salvi Psychiatric Hospital, Florence, Kingdom of Italy
- Other names: "The Child Killer" "Carlino"
- Conviction: N/A
- Penalty: Involuntary commitment

Details
- Victims: 4
- Span of crimes: 1873–1875
- Country: Kingdom of Italy
- State: Florence
- Date apprehended: 29 August 1875

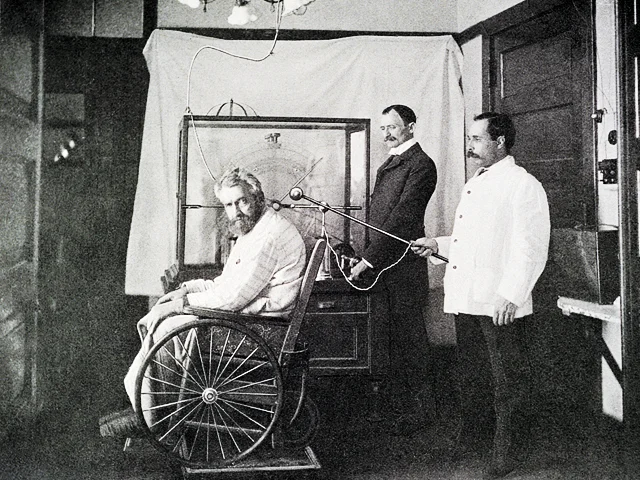

Callisto Grandi (1849 – 1911), known as The Child Killer (Italian: l'Ammazzabambini), was an Italian serial killer who murdered four children in Florence from 1873 to 1875 because they made fun of his disabilities. His trial became a sensation during his time, and was of particular interest to noted criminologist Cesare Lombroso.

Grandi was eventually ruled to be unfit to stand trial and ordered to be interned at a psychiatric hospital for at least 20 years, where he remained until his death in 1911.

== Early life ==
Callisto Grandi was born in Incisa in Val d'Arno in 1849, and very little is known about his life. He worked as a craftsman and wagon repairman in his hometown, and everyone spoke of him as someone with various physical deformities and low intelligence. He was often teased by villagers because of his physical deformities; in fact, he was called "Ventudito" (he had a foot with six toes) and "Bald Carlino" (Italian: Carlino il pelato) because of his short stature and bald head that was disproportionate to the rest of his body.

Due to all of these factors, Grandi became a favorite target of children's jokes and pranks. This led to him developing an extreme urge to kill those who had made fun of him.

== Murders ==
On 18 March 1873, at about 11 AM, 3-year-old Luigi Bonechi mysteriously disappeared after his mother Assunta had left him alone for just fifteen minutes. Searches were conducted by his parents around the Arno river, where they suspected he had fallen in, but Luigi was not found.

Almost two years later, on 2 February 1875, 3-year-old Arturo Degli Innocenti disappeared in Florence. Like Bonechi before him, it was initially believed that he had drowned in the Arno.

The hypothesis of a maniac targeting children was strengthened that summer, when two more children disappeared between 21 and 22 August: 9-year-old Fortunato Paladini and 7-year-old Angelo Martelli, both of whom were last seen in Figline Valdarno. Soon afterwards, Paladini's parents found his straw hat near the banks of the Arno – this led to speculation that the cause of death was not drowning, since the river was dry during the summer months.

== Arrest ==
Nothing was heard of Paladini and Martelli for a week, until 29 August. On that day, Rachele Turchi, while doing chores around the house, greeted her 9-year-old son Amerigo, who, with a piece of bread in his hand, had gone out for a few minutes on his way to Petrarca Street, where Grandi's store was located. The mother recommended to Amerigo to come back soon because lunch was almost ready, but the child was late in returning. After four minutes, the mother became alarmed and went down the street. Shortly thereafter, neighbor Argenta Monsecchi and her daughter Giulia heard the little boy shouting from inside Grandi's store. They then called authorities, who subsequently broke down the door and entered the store. Inside, they saw Amerigo with his face covered in blood and several scratches and injuries all over his body. Grandi attempted to explain it away by claiming that the boy hit himself on a wheel, but the teary-eyed Amerigo claimed that the older man had attempted to kill him.

He recounted how, as soon as he left home, he was lured by Grandi's workshop by the man telling him that he was going to play a game with other children called "Piattacuccù", which consisted of flattening himself on the ground. Grandi had Amerigo lie down in a pit that had been dug out prior, but instead of hiding him with an apron, Grandi started throwing piles of earth on top of him and attempted to crush his head by pressing on it with his foot. Amerigo managed to free himself and get out of the pit, after which Grandi put his hands around his neck as the child put up a fierce resistance, even managing to bite the attacker.

Grandi was therefore arrested by municipal guard Fortunato Piccioli, who had arrived on the scene, and his entire store was searched. The putrefied remains of the four missing boys were found buried inside the store, with Grandi immediately confessing to killing them. Like Amerigo, the four children were lured inside the workshop with some sort of excuse, only to be put in the pit and crushed with the wheel that Grandi rolled on their backs, killing them.

Grandi claimed that he killed the children due to their teasing of his appearance. An autopsy concluded that the four boys had died of asphyxiation after being buried alive; their lungs were putrefied and their brains were reduced to mush, a sign of a heavy rush of blood to the head as if it had been crushed while the victims were buried in the small pits dug by Grandi.

== Trial, internment, and death ==
On 18 December 1876, a hearing was scheduled at the Florence Tribunal to decide what sentence would be imposed on Grandi. At the hearing, several doctors and psychiatrists argued that the defendant was too mentally incapacitated to stand trial. Grandi himself confessed to each of the murders in the courtroom, giving different justifications about why he killed each boy.

On 29 December, the court ruled that Grandi should spend 20 years in prison. The verdict was met with disagreement by famed criminologist Cesare Lombroso, who agreed with the defense's argument that Grandi was too mentally impaired to understand the gravity of his actions.

Grandi served his sentence at the Murate Prison in Florence, and later asked to be hospitalized at Montedomini, but this request was denied. In 1895, he was transferred to the San Salvi Psychiatric Hospital, where he remained until his death in 1911.

== Legacy ==
The murders and Grandis's subsequent trial remained a topic of debate in regard to whether he was mentally capable of standing trial for his crimes centuries after it had concluded. It was the subject of a study by Patrizia Guarnieri in 1988, which was covered in local papers.

== See also ==
- List of serial killers by country
- List of serial killers before 1900
