= Managua Ripper =

Alleged unidentified Nicaraguan serial killer

The Managua Ripper was an alleged unidentified serial killer who murdered six women in Managua, Nicaragua, in January 1889.

== Murders ==
According to a report from The Sun on 24 January 1889, six impoverished female sex workers were murdered in secluded areas of Managua, the capital of Nicaragua, in the span of ten days. Each victim was disfigured with a knife, with two being found "butchered out of all recognition". Robbery was ruled out as a motive due to two of the victims still possessing their jewelry. No evidence was left behind by the perpetrator.

== Jack the Ripper ==
Author Trevor Marriott speculated that Jack the Ripper and the Managua Ripper were the same individual due to similarities in the murders—and the fact that the first Managua murder occurred months after the murder of Mary Jane Kelly (the final canonical Jack the Ripper victim in England) and the recent arrival of the British Sylph cargo ship in the Caribbean. The Sylph had also departed from Barbados to England shortly before the murder of Mary Ann Nichols (the first canonical Jack the Ripper victim in 1888). Contemporaneous reports also noted similarities in the murders.

== Possible hoax ==
During an unrelated visit to Nicaragua in July 1889, the Courier Journal reported that the murders were "absolutely unknown" to the locals of Managua.

== See also ==
- List of serial killers before 1900
- San Juan del Sur Psychopath
