= San Juan del Sur Psychopath =

Unidentified Nicaraguan serial killer

The San Juan del Sur Psychopath

Details
- Victims: 1–10
- Span of crimes: 2001–2002
- Country: Nicaragua
- State: Rivas
- Date apprehended: Never apprehended

The San Juan del Sur Psychopath is the name of a suspected Nicaraguan serial killer, allegedly responsible for the deaths of at least one and possibly up to nine other men, in San Juan del Sur, one of the country's most popular tourist centers. Only one suspect, a German national, was arrested on suspicion, but was later cleared of involvement.

== Alleged crimes ==
Between 2000 and 2002, a total of ten men died in the coastal town under suspicious circumstances, causing the local population to spread rumors of a serial killer operating in the area. Authorities were called in, but they could only conclusively prove that one of the victims was murdered, while the others, most of whom lacked any external injuries to their bodies, had likely died from other circumstances (alcohol intoxication or suffocation).

=== Confirmed murder ===
- José Antonio Castillo Torres (26) - in early March 2002, the body of Castillo, a local photographer, was found on the road leading to a bar named "El Oro", around 200 meters away from his house. A married man with a 5-month-old child, José had left the house early on the day before his murder, as he had to deliver some photographs, after which he was seen partying in "El Integral". After having a few drinks, he left the premises around 1 o'clock in the morning, riding home on his bike. When examined, it was revealed that he had suffered a fracture of his cranium, coupled with bilateral sinking of the eyes, as well as multiple other fractures to his frontal parietal lobe. Robbery was ruled out as a motive, as his backpack, which contained his two cameras and many photographs, was still present at the crime scene.

=== Suspected murders ===
- José Santos Merlo Acuña (80) - on October 8, 2000, Merlo's body was found floating at the anchorage of San Juan del Sur's bay. The investigation found that the suspect was not in Nicaragua at the time. No external injuries were observed, and the death was ruled a suffocation.
- José Casimiro Salas Chávez (52) - on New Year's Eve, 2001, Salas' lifeless body was found on the rocky riverbank of the Rio Escondido, an estuary near San Juan del Sur. He had suffered from blunt trauma, forming a sharp lesion on the left part of his neck, and later drowned by submerging into the water.
- Unidentified (approx. 45) - date of death unrecorded. When located, the decedent reeked of alcohol and likely suffocated as a result of heavy drinking. According to authorities, he most likely had fallen over and began having convulsions, resulting in his death.
- Marcelino José Salina (65) - body found on March 25, 2001, in the Nacascolo sector. No physical injuries were present on the body, and it was theorized that, similarly to the unidentified man, Salina had fallen into a sewer and died from convulsions induced by alcohol.
- Tranquilino Barberena Jiménez (67) - found on June 25, 2001, in the park area. When transported to the San Juan Health Center, it was determined that Jiménez had a heart attack, quickly followed by a cardiac arrest.
- Mario Antonio Chévez (21) - found on October 9, 2001, hanged with a sheet from his bedroom ceiling. The medical examiner determined the death as "asphyxiation by hanging".
- Sergio Enríquez Vélasquez (46) - Ecuadorian expatriate; lifeless body found on the estuary on October 22, 2001. No signs of physical trauma were found upon examination.
- José Barbosa Molina (68) - found on December 7, 2001, on the west side of Loma del Indio. The coroner's ruling was that there were no signs of external injuries to the body.
- Jesús Bernardo Flores Aguirre (73) - found on December 18, 2001. No signs of external injuries were found on the body.

=== Disproven ===
- Manuel González - nearly killed in a brutal attack in the town, during which his fingernails were ripped off. Initially thought to be a victim of the Psychopath, González himself later confirmed that it was a man with whom he had quarreled at the time.

== Suspect ==
Only one man was ever charged with any of the murders: a German national who allegedly had lived illegally in Managua on an expired visa from January 22, 2001, until April of that same year. He was accused of being responsible for at least seven of the deaths by the local population, and on March 22, 2002, he was arrested by the police. On May 9, however, he was allowed to walk free, but was required to attend court every Friday. In an attempt to find evidence, Nicaraguan authorities investigated the suspect's past through Interpol and sent in some of his belongings for testing: the most notable of which was a book about two twin brothers, one of whom would become a psychopath and mafia hitman, which would serve as possible evidence.

In the end, the suspect was only charged with the deaths of Salas and Castillo by the Rivas Department Police. After a few months, he was dismissed by Justice Marianela Paredes on October 9, citing abandonment of the trial, as none of the prosecuting parties managed to present any substantive evidence against the accused.

== See also ==
- Managua Ripper
- List of fugitives from justice who disappeared
