= Luigi Richetto =

Italian serial killer

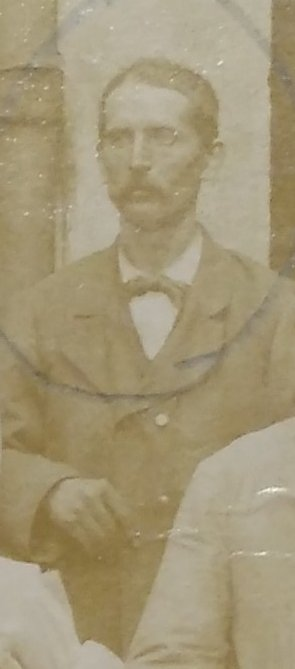
- Group photo with Luigi Richetto
- Born: Gioanni-Luigi Richetto; 22 March 1853; Chianocco, Kingdom of Sardinia
- Died: 14 December 1901 (aged 48); Devil's Island, Salvation Islands, French Guiana
- Convictions: Murder (×2); Theft (×3)
- Penalty: Life imprisonment

Details
- Victims: 4 (2 convictions)
- Span of crimes: 1893–1899
- Country: France
- State: Auvergne-Rhône-Alpes
- Date apprehended: 9 January 1900

Gioanni-Luigi Richetto (22 March 1853 – 14 December 1901) was an Italian serial killer who murdered and dismembered four people in Lyon, France, from 1893 to 1899. He was arrested on 9 January 1900, and sentenced to life imprisonment in 1901; he was sent to serve his sentence at the Salvation Islands in French Guiana, where he died a few months later.

== Biography ==
Gioanni-Luigi Richetto was born on 22 March 1853, in Chianocco, then in the Kingdom of Sardinia, the son of Luigi Richetto and Maddalena Giai. He was baptized the following day in the church of San Pietro Apostolo.

His father, having spent all of his inheritance in "gambling, wine and debauchery" left for Turin and found a job in the tapestry section of the Royal House, from where he was sent back in 1866 or 1867, for theft of silver lamps in the Chapelle de Saint-Suaire. In May 1872, again detained for theft, he was declared as suffering from mania and dementia and admitted to the Royal Asylum of Aliénes in Turin, where he died on 14 January 1873. Richetto's mother would eventually also be admitted to that same asylum on 11 January 1881, diagnosed as suffering from "hysterical madness in a melancholic form", dying there on 17 September 1882.

Richetto followed his father in Turin in 1863, finishing his studies there at the Professional School. After graduating, he found a job at the Railway Company of Upper Italy.

In 1882, he was arrested and sentenced to 5 years imprisonment for robbery, serving his sentence at Fossano prison.

On his release in September 1887, he stayed with his mother's family in Bussoleno for several months. After borrowing some money from his sister, Luigi left for France. He first passed through Algeria, then Marseille and finally Lyon, where he settled on 15 December 1887.

In 1888, he found a job as a nurse. When his patient died, his employers brought him to their trading house as a servant. He was fired on 16 December 1893, after he was caught stealing wine from the cellar, but he avoided prosecution for the crime.

Richetto then became an apprentice shoemaker, setting up his own shop in April 1894. In June 1896, he became a concierge in the house of the Camillians, on 96 Route de Francheville.

== Discovery of bodies and arrest ==
On 2 January 1900, two packages containing strange meat were found on the Noack property on 116 Route de Francheville. Two days later, in the presence of a rural policeman, a third package was found. A butcher misidentified the meat as veal, and the packages were reburied on-site.

On 5 January, the property was searched again, and three additional bundles and a severed human torso were discovered.

The following day, in the presence of examining magistrate Alexandre Lacassagne, the property was extensively dug up, uncovering packages containing two human heads. Both of them had been wrapped up in newspapers dated from April to August 1897, and pieces of cloth.

Lacassagne's report from that day described the following:

"1st. the remains of a woman consisting of a skull with hair, a pelvis, a portion of the spine.

a. The skull is that of a woman around 60 to 70 years of age. The lower jaw is missing. The hair is grey; there is a fake braid consisting a bun impregnated with carbonaceous dust.

b. The pelvis is complete: there are two femurs, cut precisely with a saw.

The transformations of muscles and tissues into adipocere shows a stay in water of more than a year.

2nd. Sixteen fragments constitute the almost complete body of a toothless woman of about 60 years of age, weighing about 70 kilograms. This woman was small and very plump: she would have been recognized as a milkmaid from the country who came this morning accompanied by a gardener. The hepatic docimasia test allows us to say this woman died in full digestion.

In addition, a blunt instrument wound to the upper part of the skull on the vertex shows that this woman was knocked out with a blunt instrument such as a hammer.

On the left breast, there are numerous bruises produced in the living or during the agonic period, which seem to indicate strong pressures and as a strangely special mark. On 8 January, Marceline Luce-Catinot recognized the head exhibited in the morgue as that of her mother, Augustine Penet. She stated that in the neighbourhood where the body was found, she only knew a certain Louis, who worked as a janitor for a local branch of the Camillians.

Following a quick search of Richetto's home on the next day, the policemen found issues of the newspaper L'Autorité, dating from the same period as the ones used to wrap Mrs. Penet's remains. Having learned that Richetto had served time in Italy, the deputy requested his arrest. During the complete search that followed, many bloodstains were found on the floor between two rooms, a woman's stocking marked AC, and a receipt signed "Madame Delorme". Behind Richetto's lodge, a large quantity of lime mixed with sawdust was discovered. Other compromising clues were also found: a 34-cm long kitchen knife, stuck in the ground on the Camillian property, a suitcase emitting a foul odour and stained with lime and sawdust. After examining the attic, the authorities found that it had been saturated with blood and human fat.

On 26 January, more human remains were found in a hedge on Chemin des Graviers, in Saint-Fons.

== Victims ==
In the course of the investigation, Luigi Richetto was implicated in the murders of four people:

=== Marie Bernaz ===
François Marie Lucien Bernaz, born in 1811, married Marie Pierrette Couturier (born in 1828) in Lyon on 18 October 1849. The couple temporarily moved to South America, residing in Buenos Aires and then Montevideo. They returned to France at the beginning of 1890. Luigi Richetto had done some odd jobs for them, and was even provided accommodation on the ground floor of 55 Cours Gambetta.

On 24 April 1893, Bernaz, unable to enter his wife's locked room, asked a neighbour to go through the window. Both of them then discovered Mrs. Bernaz's body

"lying on her back and resting fully clothed on the floor. Her face was covered in blood and bore marks of blows to the temple as well as scratches around the neck".

On 29 April, Richetto was questioned in the case, but managed to provide himself with an alibi and was released. For some time, suspicion fell on the husband, but the proceedings were quickly dropped and the case was closed.

=== Régis Planial ===
Régis Planial, a 55-year-old furniture dealer, disappeared from his home at 68 Rue Montesquieu on 7 December 1894, leaving the door open and the lamp on. His concierge reported the disappearance the next day. Four days later, a sailor fishing in the Rhône near the island of Pierre-Bénite, off the coast of Saint-Fons, found a bag containing the upper half of a human torso.

On 21 April 1895, a man exploring Badet Island in La Roche-de-Glun found human remains, consisting of the pelvis and the upper half of the thighs. On 20 November, the victim's left leg was discovered in Le Pouzin.

Five days after that, a fisherman found the right leg on the shore of Sainte Island, in Saint-Rambert-d'Albon. Dr. Lacassagne's report established that all of the remains belonged to the same male cadaver. The individual was between 168 and 174 cm tall, and between 45 and 60 years of age.

Several penetrative wounds were noted, made by a long, sharp instrument, such as a sword. The neck also bore marks from strangulation, and the beheading had taken place while the victim was either still alive or had just died.

=== Marguerite Long ===
Marguerite Long, the 63-year-old widow of Auguste Delorme, a retailer, disappeared from her home on 27 Rue des Trois-Pierres on 21 July 1898. Her neighbours suspected that she had been murdered in an ambush for her money, but police found no evidence to support that theory.

Richetto had visited her home on several occasions, with Marguerite herself claiming that she was going to visit Saint-Just just days before she vanished. After Richetto's arrest, several items belonging to Long were found, including a silver snuff box.

=== Augustine Penet ===
Richetto first met the victim around 1892. He won her trust and even helped her acquire her dairy fund. Augustine Penet had visited him several times, and on 19 December 1899, the day of her disappearance, she had spoken to several people about her plans to visit Saint-Just. It was determined that she had been hit in the head with a blunt instrument and then stabbed five times before the killer violently stomped on her chest. Three days after she had vanished, Richetto made numerous purchases which overextended his modest salary.

== Trial, imprisonment and death ==
Due to a lack of evidence concerning the murder of Bernaz, Richetto wasn't charged in her death. The human body parts found in the Rhône in 1894 and 1895 couldn't be formally identified as those of Planial, and thus, Richetto wasn't charged with his death either.

Therefore, he was indicted for the following crimes:

1. in Lyon on 16 December 1893, the fraudulent subtraction of a quantity of wine, to the detriment of Monsieuers Guigue and Jovet;
2. in Lyon on 21 July 1898, the premeditated homicide of Marguerite Long née Delorme, in order to facilitate the fraudulent evasion stated below;
3. in Lyon on 21 July 1898, the fraudulent subtraction of various objects, to the detriment of the aforementioned Marguerite Long née Delorme;
4. in Lyon on 19 December 1899, the premeditated homicide of Augustine Penet née Luce-Catinot, in order to facilitate the fraudulent transaction stated below;
5. in Lyon on 19 December 1899, the fraudulent transaction of various objects, to the detriment of the aforementioned Augustine Penet née Luce-Catinot.

After the trial, the jury found him guilty on a majority of the charges, and Luigi Richetto was sentenced to life imprisonment. His appeal was dismissed on 10 May 1901.

On 29 June 1901, he was sent to the Devil's Island prison colony in the Salvation Islands in French Guiana. He died there on 14 December 1901, aged 48.

== Criminology ==
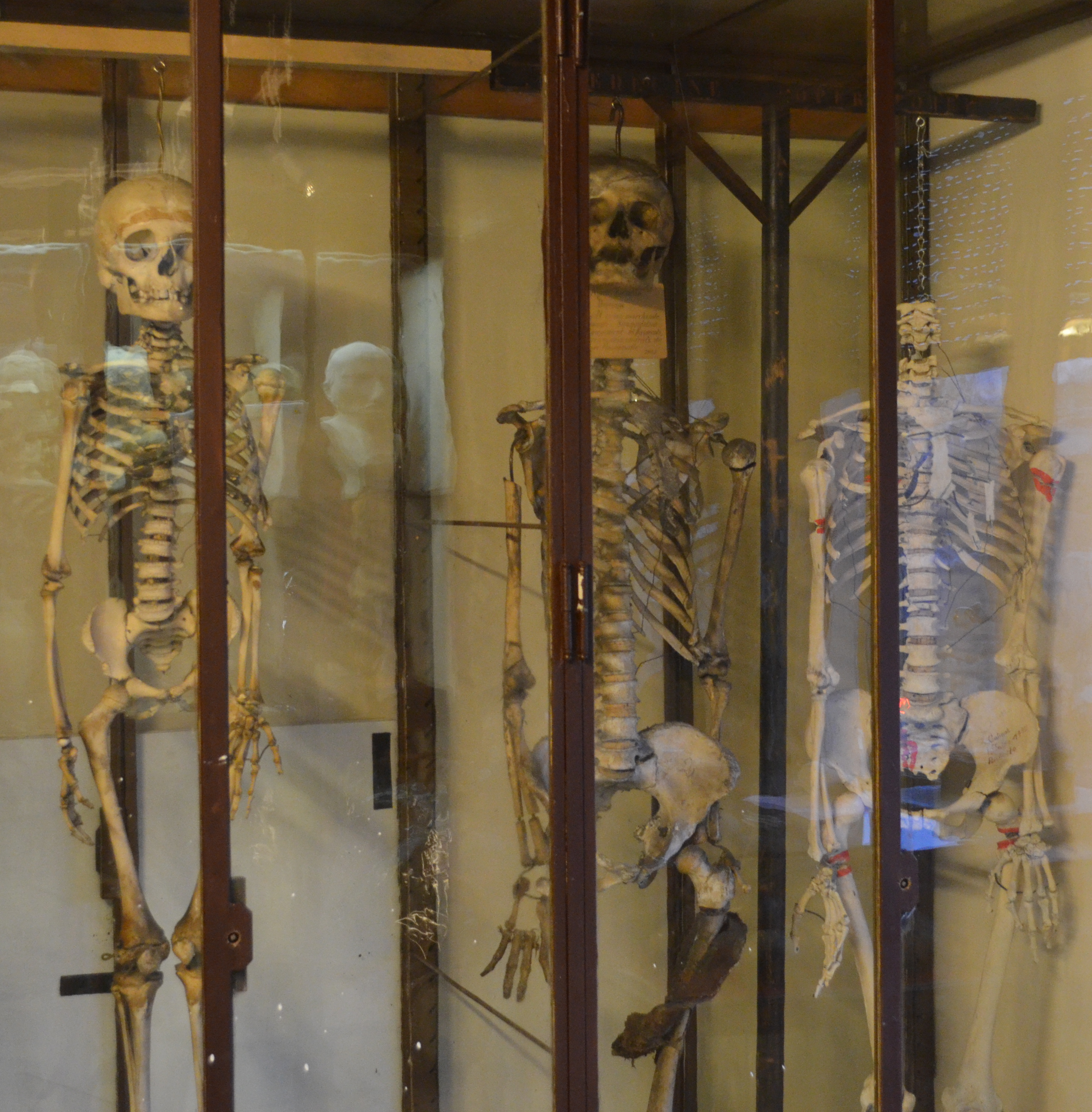
Reconstitution of the skeletons of Richetto's victims at the Testut-Latarjet Museum in Rillieux-la-Pape

- Alexandre Lacassagne took a particular interest in Richetto, after meeting him at trial. He would eventually convince him to write an autobiography. Richetto wrote a 117-page long memoir entitled "The Memoirs of Richetto", done between 14 and 21 July 1901, during his trial.
- The victims' skeletons were reconstructed at the Testut-Latarjet Museum in Rillieux-la-Pape, and remain on display there.

== See also ==
- List of French serial killers

== Bibliography ==
- Stora-Lamarre, Annie (2002). The carnal city of law (in French). Presses Univ. Franche-Comté. p. 156. ISBN 978-2-84627-062-5.
- Artières, Philippe (2000). The Book of Guilty Lives (in French). Albin Michel. p. 432. ISBN 978-2-226-19909-6.

This book takes up and presents the writings of Richetto.

- Artières, Philippe (1995). "Written crimes. The collection of autobiographies of criminals by Professor A. Lacassagne". Genèses (in French). 19 (19): 48–67. doi:10.3406/genes.1995.1291.

This article discussed the Richetto case.
