= Guadalupe Martínez de Bejarano =

Mexican serial killer

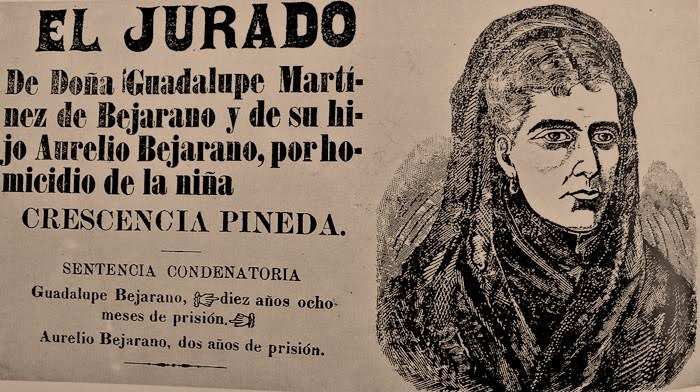
- Died: Mexico City

Details
- Victims: 3
- Span of crimes: 1877–1892
- Country: Mexico

Guadalupe Martínez de Bejarano was a Mexican serial killer, who at the end of the 19th century brutally murdered 3 girls. The press dubbed her "The Fearsome Bejarano" or "La Mujer Verdugo".

She was one of the first serial killers in the history of Mexico (contemporary to Felipe Espinosa, Francisco Guerrero Pérez); the first female recorded in Mexico. She was organized, motivated by sexual satisfaction, sedentary, and a sexual predator.

== Biography ==
Little is known about Martínez's private life, only that she married a man named Bejarano, and that with him she had at least one child: Aurelio Bejarano Martínez. She belonged to a high or medium-high social stratum (indicated by her modus operandi).

== Crimes ==
Martínez attracted her victims, young men and poor girls, by offering them employment as a servant. She took them home and showed them her true intentions: she enslaved them and subjected them to torture with marked sexual overtones. She especially enjoyed forcing them to sit naked on a burning brazier (Roman chair). She also used to hang them naked by the wrists, with a rope attached to the ceiling. She suspended them and whipped them. Finally, she starved them.

=== Victims ===
- Casimira Juárez: murdered in 1887; the first known crime of Martínez. She was apprehended and convicted, but the weak criminal legislation of the time sentenced her to only a few years in prison.
- Guadalupe and Crescencia Pineda: two sisters murdered in 1892. Martínez had just been released from prison, after 5 years.

== Condemnation and death ==
The police arrested Guadalupe again following complaints about kidnapping and torture. But the Pineda sisters were already dead after weeks or perhaps months of abuse.

In the end, her own son sank her by identifying her as the person responsible. La Bejarano defended herself by accusing her son of the crimes.

Public outrage demanded the death penalty, however, she was sentenced to 10 years and 8 months. Aurelio Bejarano was also sentenced to 2 years in prison for his initial inaction.

Guadalupe Martínez was confined in the Belén prison for women. Her confinement was spent alone considering the threat posed by the other inmates, who hated her for her crimes. She died of natural causes.

== Popular culture ==
Despite her terrible crimes, she was forgotten over time. Initially, her case inspired engravers and composers: engraver José Guadalupe Posada published several illustrations on the case, still the most recognized. Writer and editor Antonio Vanegas Arroyo composed the "Corrido de La Temible Bejarano".

== See also ==
- List of serial killers by country
- List of serial killers by number of victims
