= Mary Jane Jackson =

American serial killer (1837–1897)

- Born: Mary Jane Jackson; 1837; New Orleans, Louisiana, U.S.
- Died: December 20, 1897 (aged 60); New Orleans, Louisiana, U.S.
- Other names: "Bricktop" "Mary the Red" "Red Mary"; Mary Rufus
- Conviction: Manslaughter
- Penalty: 10 years imprisonment

Details
- Victims: 4+ murders; 25 other assaults
- Span of crimes: 1856–1862
- Country: United States; Confederate States
- State: Louisiana
- Date apprehended: 1859; 1861

Mary Jane Jackson (1837 – December 20, 1897) was an American serial killer, sex worker, and criminal active in New Orleans, Louisiana, from the 1840s to the 1860s. She was nicknamed "Bricktop" due to her bright red hair.

== Early life ==
Jackson was born in 1837 on Girod St. in New Orleans. She became a sex worker at the age of 13 and, at 14, the mistress of a local saloon owner. After he split with her three years later, she beat him to the point of hospitalization, leaving him with a broken nose and without an ear. After this, she bounced around different brothels, as she could not get along with other sex workers. She was also accused of murdering a husband in Cincinnati, Ohio.

== Murders ==
Jackson committed her first murder in 1856 at the age of 19, beating a man to death after he called her a "whore". The following year, she fatally stabbed a man nicknamed "Long Charley" due to his height of almost seven feet.

On November 7, 1859, Jackson went to a saloon on Rampart St. with two other women, Ellen Collins and America Williams. After a blacksmith named Laurent Fleury, who was seated nearby, asked her to stop cussing, she continued to do so louder out of spite. Laurent got up and slapped Jackson across the face, after which Jackson and the two other women stabbed him to death. When police arrived, they found Fleury's pants pocket and money in Jackson's possession. She was brought to Parish Prison but was released after an autopsy failed to establish Fleury's cause of death.

While imprisoned, Jackson fell in love with a jailer, criminal, and fight manager named John Miller (b. 1829 in Gretna), who himself had murdered several people in New Orleans. After her release, they committed robberies together in the French Quarter.

On the night of December 5, 1861, Miller told neighbors outside of their home in Gretna that Jackson "needed a thrashing" and went inside. The subsequent altercation ended with Miller being fatally stabbed. Jackson received a ten-year prison sentence for manslaughter but was released nine months later, after George F. Shepley emptied the local prisons due to the ongoing American Civil War. After her release, she was accused of stabbing a sailor in November 1862. At some point, Jackson allegedly left New Orleans. She returned to the city at an unknown date and died there in 1897.

== See also ==
- List of serial killers before 1900
- List of serial killers in the United States
