= Giorgio Orsolano =

Italian serial killer

- Born: 3 June 1803; San Giorgio Canavese, Italy
- Died: 17 March 1835 (aged 31); San Giorgio Canavese, Italy
- Cause of death: Execution by hanging
- Other name: "The Hyena of San Giorgio"
- Conviction: Murder
- Penalty: Death

Details
- Victims: 3
- Span of crimes: 1834–1835
- Country: Italy
- State: Piedmont
- Date apprehended: 13 March 1835

Giorgio Orsolano (3 June 1803 – 17 March 1835), known as The Hyena of San Giorgio, was an Italian serial killer who committed three murders.

== Biography ==
Giorgio Orsolano was born in San Giorgio Canavese, not far from Ivrea, to parents Antonio Orsolano and Margherita Gallo. When his father died, his mother sent Orsolano to her brother, a priest, to educate him. Every attempt was in vain, and he sent the young Orsolano back to his mother. Returning to San Giorgio, Orsolano spent more time in the tavern than at work.

In 1823, he committed his first crimes by stealing ten candles from the Confraternity of Santa Marta and other objects in the parish church of Santa Maria Assunta, both in the countryside. He also tried to rape the 16-year-old Teresa Pignocco who he kept imprisoned for six days. On 15 December 1823, he was sentenced to 8 years imprisonment for thefts and attempted rape.

He left prison on 13 December 1831 for good behaviour. He met 24-year-old widow Domenica Nigra, with whom he had a daughter, Margherita, born on 7 July 1833. The two married in early April 1834. Orsolano then opened a shop for "Cutters and sausages", which did not produce the expected profits. On 14 February 1834, he raped and killed 10-year-old Caterina Scavarda, disposing of her remains in San Giorgio's countryside. On 24 June, he raped and killed 9-year-old Caterina Givogre, beheading her afterwards and throwing the remains into the Piatonia stream. The search for the two missing girls did not yield any results, so the alleged crimes were attributed to packs of wolves that infested the area. On 3 March 1835, during a market day in San Giorgio, Orsolano persuaded 14-year-old Francesca Tonso to follow him to his house with the excuse of buying eggs. There he raped and killed her, cutting the body up with a cleaver, putting the remains in a jute sack and throwing them in the same stream. In order not to arouse suspicion, he checked to see if he had any dirt on his clothes and washed the bag in the river.

The girl's aunt and parents reported her disappearance. They directed the authorities to Orsolano's house to ask him questions, as he resembled the man last seen with the girl, according to the aunt. He reacted abruptly and drove the police away. The police subsequently discovered the precedents of Orsolano: while examining his house, they found Francesca's clogs, shreds of clothing, bloodstains and a partially dirty bag. He was arrested shortly after and taken to the castle of Ivrea after the inhabitants of San Giorgio had tried to lynch him. He continued to deny the crimes but got drunk and confessed to everything. In addition, an officer assured him that if he confessed and declared himself mad, he would be spared the death penalty. On 13 March, at the end of the trial, Orsolano was sentenced to death in Ivrea and hanged four days later in his hometown, at the Sant'Anna fraction. While in the courtroom, Orsolano listened to his sentence with indifference.

The University of Turin, on the day of the sentence, sent three surgeons to "dissect the corpse" and take away the head and testicles, described by doctors as "bulkier than usual". His skull was then brought to the Museum of Anatomy, and a cast of the head is still preserved at the Museum of Human Anatomy Luigi Rolando in Turin.

== See also ==
- List of serial killers by country

== Bibliography ==
- Andrea Accorsi and Massimo Centini: "The bloody history of serial killers, Newton Compton Editori, 2003

== See also ==
- Giovanna Bonanno
