= Franz and Rosalie Schneider =

Austrian serial killer duo

Franz Schneider
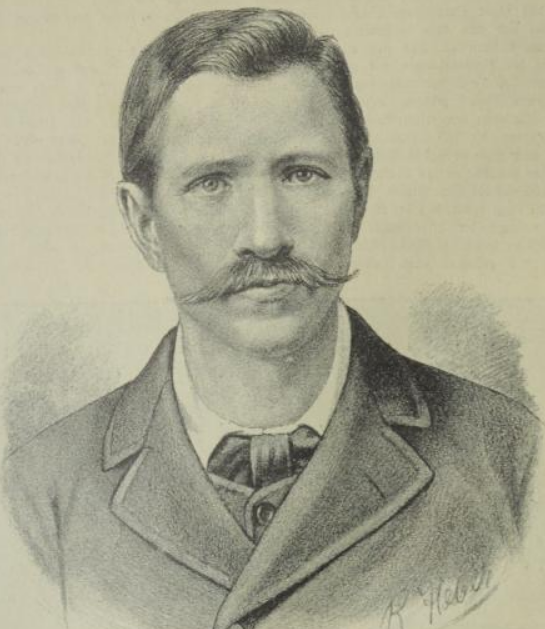
- Sketch from Das Interessante Blatt
- Born: 1857; Murstetten, Lower Austria, Austrian Empire
- Died: March 17, 1892 (aged 34–35); Vienna, Austria-Hungary
- Cause of death: Execution by hanging
- Other name: Ferdinand Riedler
- Convictions: Murder x3 Theft
- Penalty: Death

Details
- Victims: 3–6
- Span of crimes: June 18 – July 8, 1891 (confirmed)
- Country: Austria-Hungary
- State: Lower Austria
- Date apprehended: August 10, 1891

Rosalie Schneider
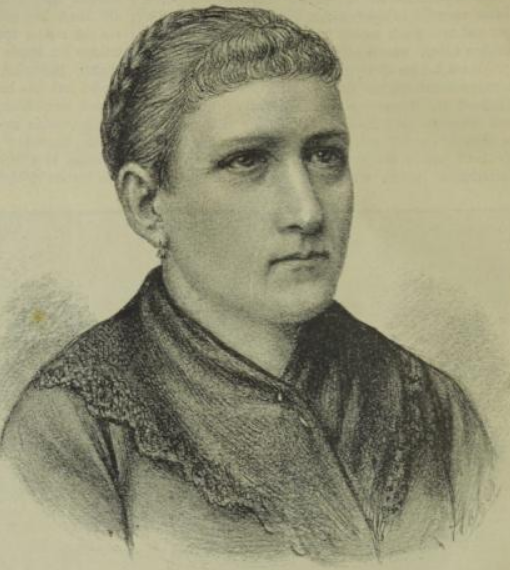
- Sketch from Das Interessante Blatt
- Born: Rosalie Capellari; 1851; Villach, Carinthia, Austrian Empire
- Died: after March 11, 1892
- Other name: Rosalie Riedler
- Conviction: Murder
- Penalty: Death; commuted to life imprisonment

Details
- Victims: 1+ (as accomplice)
- Span of crimes: June 18 – July 13, 1891 (confirmed)
- Country: Austria-Hungary
- State: Lower Austria
- Date apprehended: August 10, 1891

Franz Schneider (1857 – March 17, 1892) and Rosalie Schneider (née Capellari; 1851 – after March 11, 1892) were two serial killers from Austria-Hungary responsible for the murders of at least three women in Lower Austria in June and July 1891, although circumstantial evidence suggests they might have been responsible for a total of six. Both were sentenced to death for their respective roles, with Franz being executed in 1892 while Rosalie's death sentence was commuted to life imprisonment.

== Early life ==
Franz Schneider was born in 1857 in the small hamlet of Murstetten, in the Sankt Pölten-Land District. He had one brother, Heinrich. While little is known of his upbringing, Schneider attended school infrequently, was illiterate, and could hardly write his own name. Beginning at approximately age 14, he started committing various thefts and robberies for which he was repeatedly imprisoned.

After his release on April 28, 1891 from one of his prison stints, Schneider moved to Vienna, where he met Rosalie Capellari, a divorced cook and maidservant from Villach who was six years his senior. The pair married soon after, but it is believed that the reason for this was because Schneider wanted to obtain 700 florins as dowry. When the dowry ran out, he started blackmailing Rosalie's ex-husband for money. Sometime after this, the couple moved into an apartment in Rudolfsheim, where they would survive primarily via Franz's numerous fraudulent activities and thefts, with him occasionally taking up legitimate work as a butcher and servant.

== Crimes ==
=== Modus operandi ===
Eventually, the Schneiders decided that the quickest way to solve their financial issues was to start robbing people, with them devising a scheme to lure potential victims. This consisted of approaching women looking for work at employment offices and offering them bogus job positions with accommodation. The Schneiders usually targeted women who wanted to work as maidservants and carried with them boxes containing their valuables and personal possessions. When successful, the pair would lure them to an isolated area where Franz would sexually assault them before the victim was beaten and strangled to death, either solely by Franz or sometimes with Rosalie's help.

=== Initial attacks ===
The Schneiders' first confirmed attack occurred on September 11, 1890, when Franz approached Johanna Dumsegger at an inn in Sankt Pölten. After exchanging some pleasantries and admiring her necklace and cross, he offered Dumsegger employment at a different inn, which she accepted. He then lured her to some fields, where Schneider sexually assaulted and robbed her. Dumsegger survived and reported the incident to the authorities, but they did not believe her account due to her "bad reputation."

On May 26, 1891, Franz lured another woman, Johanna Strober, to an abandoned church in Neulengbach, where he demanded that she hand over all of her valuables. After saying that she did not have any, he proceeded to strangle and assault her, leaving her unconscious in the woods. On June 1, Franz asked Anna Gyurics to accompany him to the nearby woods, but after she refused, he offered to accompany her to the Komarek Inn. There, he sexually assaulted and robbed her before leaving, but she did not report the incident to the police at the time.

=== Murders ===
On June 18, the Schneiders went searching for a potential victim in Neulengbach when they spotted 18-year-old Rosalie Kleinrath. The pair approached her and said that they were looking to hire a servant for a Baroness Falke, under whom Mrs. Schneider served in Klosterneuburg. Kleinrath agreed to the proposal and accompanied them to their lodgings, before accepting an invitation by Franz to go out for a walk in the woods near the hamlet of St. Christophen. There, he proceeded to strangle the victim before stripping her of all valuables and leaving the body in the woods. The couple then went to her apartment, stole all of her remaining belongings and sold them.

On July 3, Rosalie went to the Servants' Office in Neulengbach and took notice of a young woman applying for work there, Marie Hottwagner. The two struck up a conversation and after telling her that she was looking for a maidservant, Hottwagner agreed to accompany her new employers to Vienna. Hottwagner's boyfriend, who had been waiting for her in a nearby pub, saw her leave in the company of the mysterious couple, but did not prevent her from leaving as he did not consider it suspicious at the time. Approximately twenty days later, Hottwagner's body was found in a forest outside the capital, showing signs that she had been strangled and then robbed. Using the loot stolen from their latest victim, the Schneiders purchased a better apartment and some additional furniture.

Five days later, the couple approached another woman, Friederike (or Vincentia) Zoufar, whom they managed to convince that they were looking for a maidservant in Neulengbach. That same day, she was lured to the nearby woods, where Franz strangled her, stripped her body of all clothing and then hid it under some tree branches. Another account claimed that Zoufar was poisoned by inhaling fumes from a bottle of toxic substances provided by Rosalie. After the murder, the Schneiders sold the woman's clothing, earning them enough money for Rosalie to quit her job and commit to helping her husband locate new victims.

== Arrest, investigation and trial ==
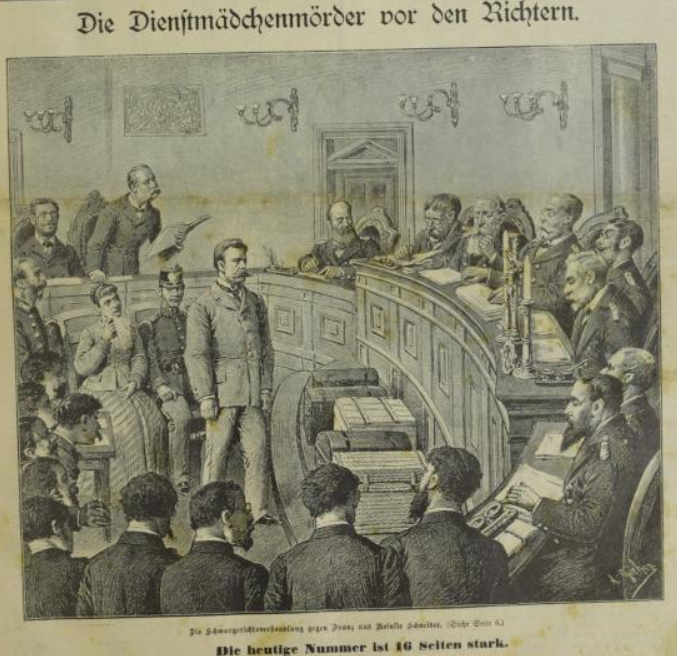
The Schneiders' trial was considered sensational at the time, and was attended by numerous members of the Viennese high society

Sometime around July 24, one of the Schneiders' surviving victims, Gyurics, finally contacted the police about the assault after the press publicized one of the murders and provided a description of the alleged offender. Her description matched that of the man last seen accompanying the murder victim, and upon further investigation, they realized that the man was none other than Franz Schneider, an ex-con with a bad reputation. Shortly after, a manhunt was organized to locate and question him for the crimes.

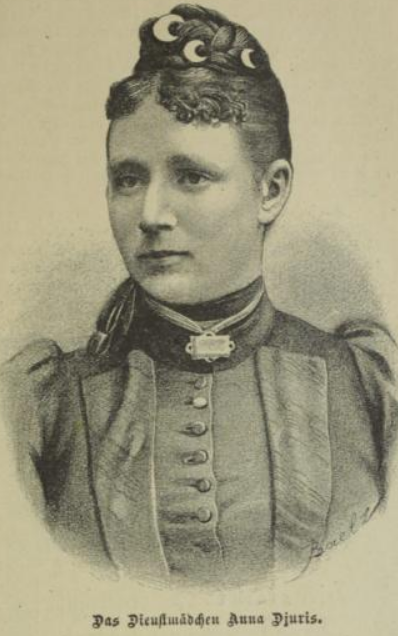
Gyurics' police report led to the arrest of the Schneiders

On August 10, 1891, both Schneiders were arrested at their residence in Rudolfsheim, where they lodged under the aliases of 'Ferdinand and Rosalie Riedler'. An inspection of their home revealed pieces of clothing belonging to the three known murder victims, but also to at least three others who remained unaccounted for. On the basis of this evidence, the Schneiders were charged with the murders and detained to await trial. On September 15, Rosalie attempted to commit suicide by jumping from a third-storey window, and while she sustained heavy injuries, she survived and was nursed back to health. Over the following few months, authorities located the bodies of the two other missing women, both of whom were in a severe state of decomposition.

The trial began on January 26, 1892. During the proceedings, Franz Schneider openly admitted to the murders, appearing seemingly unfazed and jovial throughout the trial proceedings. Prosecutors claimed that Rosalie had been an active participant, holding down some of the victims' hands to prevent her husband from being scratched on the face. Multiple witnesses and acquaintances were questioned on the stand, including the surviving victims, all of whom either testified against the Schneiders or claimed that they found some of their activities to strange but did not pry any further. At some point during the proceedings, the spouses started pinning the blame solely on one another, leading them to refuse to talk to one another altogether. The trial became a sensation in contemporary Viennese society, with numerous people following the news or attending the hearings just so they could learn more about the Schneiders' crimes. Comparisons were drawn between them and another serial killer, Hugo Schenk, who had committed similar murders with two accomplices less than a decade prior.

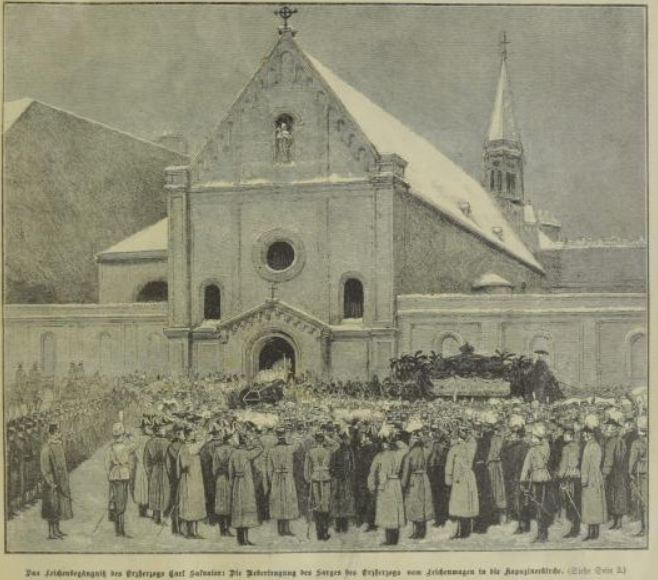
The courthouse where the Schneiders were tried

On January 29, Franz was found guilty on all charges by jury verdict, while Rosalie was found guilty for the murder of Zoufar. As a result, both of them were sentenced to death and scheduled to be hanged within the next two months, with Rosalie being selected as the first to go. However, just days before she was due to be executed, Rosalie was pardoned and her sentence reduced to life imprisonment with one week in solitary confinement.

== Franz's execution ==
In the days before his scheduled execution, Franz spent most of his time writing farewell letters to his loved ones and attempting to reconcile with his wife. According to contemporary newspapers, he was described as firm and unmoved by the sentence up until the day of his execution, where he appeared tired and gloomy due to an apparent lack of sleep, but later cheered up and spent most of the morning chatting with the guards. His request for a last meal consisted of two portions of roast pork, red wine, Virginia-brand Cuban cigars, and two coffees with milk.

In the early morning hours of March 17, 1892, Schneider was hanged in Vienna before a crowd of approximately 150–200, most of whom consisted of court officials, police officers, lawyers, doctors, and journalists. The execution was conducted by the official executioner of Austria-Hungary at the time, Jozef Seyfried. It was criticized for the fact that the executioners did put a black hood over Schneider's face and for placing a spike under the gallows. Upon hearing of her husband's execution and that he had wished her all the best, Rosalie replied with reproach and refused to acknowledge him.

== See also ==
- Hugo Schenk
- List of serial killers by country

== Bibliography ==
- Franz von Liszt (1926). Die Raubmörder Franz und Rosalie Schneider: ein kriminalpsychologischer Nachtrag [The robbery-murderers Franz and Rosalie Schneider: a criminal psychological supplement] (in German). Hollinek.
