= Murder of Jane Macmanamin =

1862 murder in Australia

Jane Macmanamin
- Born: c. 1833; Ireland
- Died: 4 February 1862; South Australia

Jane Macmanamin (c. 1833 – 4 February 1862) lived in Ireland until she migrated to South Australia in 1855. She lived the remainder of her life in South Australia. Newspaper reports of the time almost all spell her surname (incorrectly) as "Macmenimen".

== Early life ==
At the age of 22 Jane, together with her sister Margaret, 21, migrated to South Australia. They sailed to the colony aboard the ship Velocity, and the passenger lists for that voyage show that prior to migration they had been living in County Tyrone. Both were initially employed by Leonard Lovegrove of Poltalloch Station on the shore of Lake Alexandrina where Jane worked for over two years. She later worked for William Carter, who was both Postmaster and Ferry Keeper at Wellington, on the lower Murray. Jane clearly regarded Carter as a trusted confidant, and she left her savings in his keeping. All who knew her praised Jane's frugality, and when she left his employ Jane entrusted £50 and some of her possessions with Carter for safe keeping.

== Disappearance ==
By early 1862, Margaret Macmanamin was working at Guichen Bay, in the south-east of the colony, and Jane had, for about two years, been working for Malachy Martin and his wife, Catherine, at the Traveller’s Rest at Salt Creek. This was a wayside inn on the main route to the South East of the Colony, about 66 miles (106 km) from Wellington, and about 52 miles (84 km) from the little settlement at Maria Creek which later grew into the town of Kingston. Jane's wage was eleven shillings per week, but food and accommodation were also provided. She therefore had little need for cash, and so rarely drew on the amount her employer owed her. At the inquest into her death Leonard Lovegrove testified that in December 1861 she had told him that Martin owed her nearly two years' wages — about £55.

In early February 1862 Jane disappeared. Martin claimed that friends of Jane's had called at the inn on their way south, and that Jane decided to go with them as far as Maria Creek and then walk to where her sister was living. Jane and her sister had written to one another regularly, and by April 1862 Margaret was worried. She harboured suspicions against Martin. She wrote to William Carter, who made enquiries of his own, and then notified the police. Lance Corporal William Rollison from the Wellington police station investigated the disappearance, and by late May went as far as placing an undercover police trooper at the Traveller’s Rest.

== Murder ==
On 29 May an Indigenous man, "Micky", told William Allen of Woods Wells (11 miles — about 18 kilometres — north of Salt Creek) that another, Itawanie, had found Jane's body hidden and partially buried in a wombat hole about half a mile (about 800 meters) north of Martin's house. Allen telegraphed the police at Strathalbyn, where the message was received by Police Trooper Paul Foelsche who reported this by telegraph to headquarters and then rode to Wellington to inform Rollison of the discovery. Rollison subsequently began a long and very thorough investigation into the murder, and it is largely through his reports to Police Headquarters that so much detail is known about the case.

Jane's body was exhumed from the makeshift grave and taken to Woods Wells where an inquest was held on 2 June. The inquest found that Malachy Martin should be tried for wilful murder. William Allen made a coffin and buried Jane's body on top of a hill about 200 metres from house. However, the Crown Solicitor believed it was necessary that a medical expert should examine the a remains, so they were disinterred once more so this could be done. The examination was undertaken by Dr Gosse, who had travelled from Adelaide for the purpose. He found that the cause of death was strangulation.

Martin's trial date was set for 20 August 1862 and witnesses were subpoenaed.

== William Wilsen ==
One of the witnesses was a carpenter named William Wilsen. Apart from Jane and Martin, Wilsen had been the only person staying at the Traveller’s Rest at the time of Jane's disappearance, Martin's wife and children being away at the time. Wilsen had testified that Martin had sent him on an errand to a station about 20 miles (about 32 km) from Salt Creek. On his way to Adelaide to testify at the trial he stopped for the night at Wellington where, in a drunken state, he claimed to have seen Jane's dead body in the inn at Salt Creek. He was arrested as an accessory to the crime, the trial was postponed, and Wilsen was taken to Adelaide to stand trial with Martin on 2 and 3 December 1862. Wilsen claimed that he had asked Jane to marry him on the evening of 3 February 1862 and that she had accepted his offer, but he had told no one about this except Malachy Martin. If true it would seem that this is what prompted Martin to murder Jane rather than pay her the two years' wages he owed her. However, Wilsen appears to be an unreliable witness, and Martin said that Jane had promised not to leave while Mrs. Martin was away. Of course Martin cannot be regarded as a reliable witness either, but his claim does suggest the possibility that Jane was making plans to leave well before Wilsen's alleged proposal. A much more reliable witness, William Carter, said that not long before her death Jane had told him her savings in the hands of Martin amounted to £70, and that she was considering taking all her savings and returning to Ireland.

== Trial and sentence ==
Neither Martin nor Wilsen testified at the trial. Martin was found guilty and sentenced to death and was hanged at the Adelaide Gaol on 24 December 1862. His remains were buried within the gaol. Wilsen was found guilty as an accessory after the fact and sentenced to four years hard labour. The newspaper reports indicate that Martin made only one statement from the gallows: he denied that Wilsen ever saw Jane's body at Salt Creek.

== Grave ==
After Dr Gosse had examined Jane's remains they were reinterred where William Allen had buried them at Woods Wells. In the 1920s there were reports of a jam tin marking the site of Jane's grave, and later of a stone cairn being erected there. However, but by the middle of the twentieth century the exact location had been forgotten. It was located in 1966 by a government surveyor, and then Alan Johnston of Woods Wells and Arthur Reed confirmed the exact spot by digging down until they found bones. They then placed a concrete headstone on the grave. A memorial service was held there in 1972. The grave is on private property, but the fence around it can be seen, looking east from the highway, as one passes through Woods Wells.
