= Hugo Schenk =

Austrian serial killer (1849–1884)

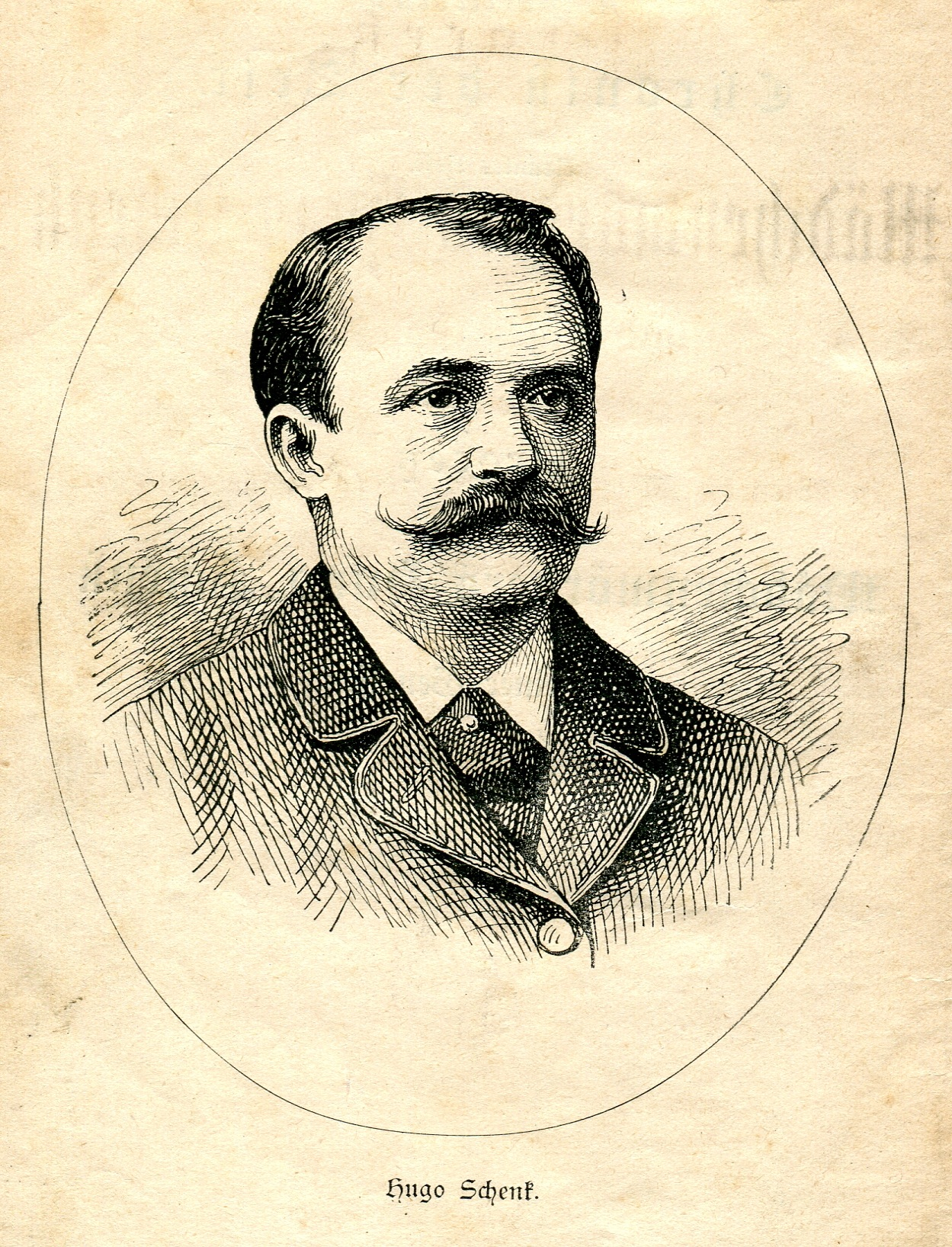
- Born: 11 February 1849; Čechy pod Kosířem, Margraviate of Moravia, Austrian Empire (present-day Czech Republic)
- Died: 22 April 1884 (aged 35); Vienna, Lower Austria, Austria-Hungary (present-day Republic of Austria)
- Cause of death: Executed by hanging
- Other name: The Viennese Housemaids Killer
- Convictions: Marriage fraud (1870, 1881); Rape, murder (1884)
- Penalty: Imprisonment (1870, 1881); Death sentence (1884)

Details
- Victims: 4–6+
- Span of crimes: May – December 1883
- Country: Austria-Hungary
- Location: Vienna
- Date apprehended: 10 January 1884

Hugo Ignatz Rudolf Schenk (11 February 1849 – 22 April 1884), also known as The Viennese Housemaids Killer, was an Austrian serial killer and imposter who murdered four maids with the help of an accomplice, Karl Schlossarek (1858–1884), although he may have murdered six or more people.

== Activities ==
Schenk was born into a well-off family as a son of Wilhelm Schenk, a judge working in Moravia and Cieszyn, and his wife Barbara, whose father was a burger of Olomouc. His brother worked as a community doctor in Maria Taferl. In 1869 and 1870 he began his criminal life as an escapee from the henchmen of the "Tsar from Warsaw", Prince Boleslav von Wilopolsky, and was tried as a marriage swindler to get the dowry of the alleged brides. Sentenced on December 5, 1870, to a five-year stay at the Mírov detention centre for a number of serious frauds, but was pardoned and released after two years.

At the age of 32, he was once again convicted of marital fraud for two years in a heavy dungeon at the Stein Prison. In prison, he met Karl Schlossarek, who was imprisoned for theft. After his release in January 1883, Schenk met the 34-year-old Josefine Timal, who worked as a maid in Vienna, where he worked as a railway engineer and promised her marriage. Timal gave into his confidence, quit her job, packed all her valuables and travelled with him to their alleged honeymoon in Kraków. However, he raped her near the Hranice Abyss. With the help of Schlossarek, he gagged and tied Timal, robbed her of valuables and sank her with a heavy stone into the abyss.

Because Schenk was of the opinion that her aunt Katharina, who worked as a maid in Budweis, could notice Josefine's disappearance, he also planned to kill her. He wrote to her that he had married Josefine and invited her to his estate. On 21 June 1883, he picked her up from the station and took her to Krummnußbaum, where he overpowered and killed her along the banks of the Danube, with Schlossarek's assistance. After taking all her valuables, they sank Katharina into the river. Only six weeks later Schenk murdered the maid Theresia Ketterl in a gorge in Lilienfeld to get her valuables. On 28 December 1883, the duo murdered and buried maid Rosa Ferenczi in the Danube at Kittsee to rob her.

On 10 January 1884, Hugo Schenk was arrested, and just a day later Karl Schlossarek. Both were sentenced to death by hanging and executed on 22 April 1884, in Court No. 1 of the Vienna Regional Court.

== Legacy ==
The skull of Hugo Schenk, which was autopsied and neurologically examined after the execution by Viennese neurologist Moritz Benedikt, is in the Vienna Criminal Museum. The writer Egon Kisch has dealt with the story of a woman who survived Schenk's attack in his short story entitled A Woman Waits for Hugo Schenk.

== Literature ==
- Ludwig Altmann: Hugo Schenk und seine Genossen. (= Aus dem Archiv des grauen Hauses – Eine Sammlung merkwürdiger Wiener Straffälle, Band 2). Wien-Leipzig-München 1925.
- Moriz Benedikt, Rudolf Frank: Anthropologischer Befund bei dem Mörder Hugo Schenk. In: Wiener Medizinische Blätter, XIV. Jg., Nr. 1 (1885).
- Michael Kirchschlager: Der Mädchenmörder Hugo Schenk. Historische Kriminal-Bibliothek, Band 1. ISBN 3-934277-15-2
- Egon Erwin Kisch: Eine Frau, die auf Hugo Schenk wartet. In: Ders.: Prager Pitaval. Gesammelte Werke in Einzelausgaben. Hrsg. von Bodo Uhse und Gisela Kisch. II/2. Berlin/Weimar: Aufbau, 1975, S. 34–44.
- Proceß des Mädchenmörders Hugo Schenk und seiner Genossen, verhandelt in Wien im März 1884 vor dem Ausnahmegerichte. Nach authentischen Berichten bearbeitet. Wien 1883.
- Bernhard Purin: Hugo Schenk – Ein Heiratsschwindler und Serienmörder zu Besuch in Rosenburg. In: Horner Kalender 2015 (Verlag Ferdinand Berger & Söhne), S. 93–103.

== See also ==
- Franz and Rosalie Schneider
- List of serial killers by country
