= Malachi Martin (murderer) =

Australian murderer and suspected serial killer

- Born: Malachi Earl Martin c. 1831; Ireland
- Died: 24 December 1862 (aged 30–31); Adelaide Gaol, Australia
- Status: Executed by hanging
- Conviction: Murder
- Penalty: Death

Details
- Victims: 2–5
- Span of crimes: 1856–1862
- Country: Australia
- State: Adelaide
- Date apprehended: June 1862

Malachy Martin (Irish: Máel Ó Máirtín, also Malachi Earl Martin; c. 1831 – 24 December 1862) was an Irish-born Australian murderer. In 1862, he was convicted of the murder of Jane Macmanamin, for which he was executed the same year. He was later found responsible for the killing of his wife's first husband, William Robinson, and is suspected to have been involved in the disappearance of two travellers and the killing of an Aboriginal teenager.

== Early life ==
Malachi Martin was the son of Michael Martin and Mary (née Fleming), born in about 1831 in Ireland. Although in most official records his given name is written as "Malachi" it is clear that his parents actually gave him the traditional Irish form of the name, popularised through the veneration of St. Malachy, a 12th-century Bishop of Armagh. He arrived in South Australia as a child, accompanied by his parents (probably on board the brig Emma from Hobart in March 1837). Martin grew up around the Willunga district, south of Adelaide and in 1844, just before he turned 13, he was charged with theft while working at a post office at the settlement at Encounter Bay. He was tried at Adelaide but found not guilty. Six days later, his mother, Mary, died in strange circumstances by drowning in a pond near the family farm. Although all witnesses stated that they had not observed anything to cause them to question her state of mind, the inquest into her death found that she had committed suicide "while labouring under temporary insanity" due to her distress over her son's criminal trial. She was heavily pregnant at the time.

== Death of William Robinson ==
A few years later, Martin moved to his father's new pastoral lease near the Coorong. Martin also worked as a mail coach driver from Encounter Bay to Kingston SE and Naracoorte. At the time this was the only main road from Adelaide to Melbourne. While living in the area, he became friends with William and Catherine Robinson, who ran an inn, the Traveller's Rest at Salt Creek, a small settlement along the Coorong. It was later believed that Catherine and Martin were having an affair which was to have fatal consequences. On 14 June 1856, William Robinson's body was discovered with his throat cut. Martin was a suspect, but was never charged with his murder. Several weeks later, he moved to Sydney for two years before returning to South Australia and marrying Catherine on 23 June 1858.

== Murder of Jane Macmanamin ==
A young woman named Jane Macmanamin was working at Traveller's Rest, but in February 1862 she disappeared. Although Martin stated she had moved away on a whim to the Mount Gambier area in the colony's south east, in April 1862, Jane's sister, who had constantly stayed in contact with her, sent a letter to the police in Adelaide, suspicious because she had not heard from Jane in some time. This matter was being investigated by Lance Corporal William Rollison from the Wellington police station. On 29 May, a Ngarrindjeri local, "Micky", told William Allen of Woods Well (11 miles—about 18 kilometres—north of Salt Creek) that a fellow Ngarrindjeri by the name of Itawanie had found Jane's body hidden and partially buried in a wombat hole about half a mile (about 800 meters) north of Martin's house. Allen telegraphed the police at Strathalbyn, where the message was received by Police Trooper Paul Foelsche who reported this by telegraph to headquarters and then rode to Wellington to inform Rollison of the discovery. Rollison subsequently began a long and very thorough investigation into the murder, and it is largely through his reports to Police Headquarters that so much detail is known about the case.

In June 1862, Martin was charged with the murder of Jane Macmanamin. Another man, William Wilsen, who claimed he had been engaged to her, was charged with being an accessory after the fact. Martin was tried and found guilty. He was hanged at the Adelaide Gaol on 24 December 1862. He is buried between the walls within the gaol. Wilsen was found guilty of assisting Martin after the murder and sentenced to four years hard labour. He was deported to Tasmania to carry out his sentence.

== Other possible murders ==
As well as the two murders which were attributed to Martin, there was also suspicion as to the disappearances of two men from the Salt Creek area in 1859. A traveller found a damaged rosewood jeweller's box approximately two and half miles from Salt Creek. On inspection, it contained a piece of linen with the name "G. F. King" written on one of the corners. It was suggested by Edward Bright, a contemporary diarist that a man named Harry Kirby and a jeweller stayed at the Traveller's Rest and subsequently disappeared.

The police also investigated reports from local Ngarrindjeri that Martin had murdered an indigenous teenager with whom he had had an altercation. Sometime after the boy's suspicious disappearance, a group of indigenous people were bathing in a deep water hole near Salt Creek. They found the boy's body in a bag, weighted down by a large stone. This incident occurred sometime in late 1859 or early 1860, but the police were unable to find any witnesses who would admit to having actually seen the body, only people who claimed to have heard the story from others.

== See also ==
- List of serial killers by country
