= Edward Bates Soper =

Executed American serial killer

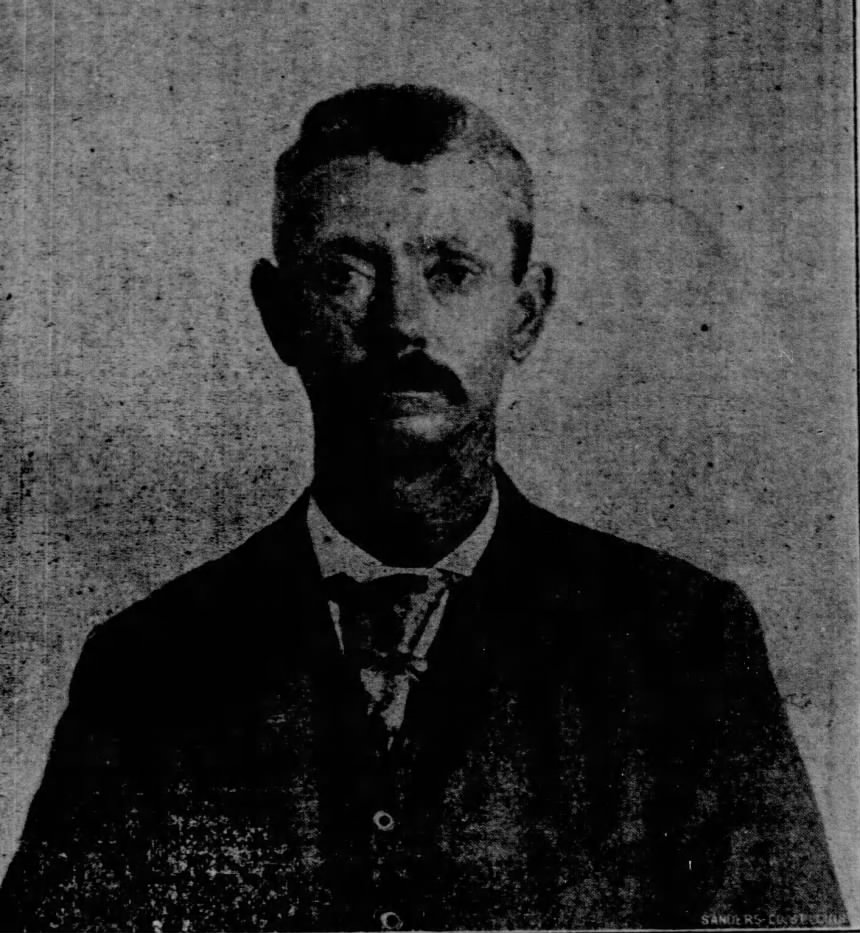
- Soper c. 1899
- Born: February 7, 1855; Kearney, Missouri, U.S.
- Died: March 30, 1899 (aged 44); Harrisonville, Missouri, U.S.
- Other names: See aliases & nicknames: The Archie Butcher; R. S. "Sandy" Soper; Homer Lee; Prentice
- Status: Executed by hanging
- Conviction: First degree murder (x1)
- Penalty: Death

Details
- Victims: 1 (convicted); 5 confessed
- Span of crimes: 1880–1897
- Country: United States
- States: Missouri; Oregon
- Date apprehended: June 10, 1897

Edward Bates Soper (February 7, 1855 – March 30, 1899) was an American serial killer. Initially sought for the murder of his first wife and two daughters in Archie, Missouri in 1895, Soper killed a son from his second wife near Portland, Oregon two years later. After his arrest, he confessed to five homicides committed throughout his life, starting with the murder of his father in 1880, but was convicted and hanged solely for one of the murders in Archie.

== Early life and Missouri murders ==
Edward Bates Soper was born on February 7, 1855, in Kearney, Missouri, the second of eight children born to farmers John Lewis Soper and Sarah Hyatt Soper (née Estes). Little is known of his life prior to committing his first crime, that being stealing a horse at the age of 20 and selling it in Kansas City. Sometime after committing this deed, Soper hatched a plan to kill his father John, whom he had grown to hate over the years for unclear reasons.

=== Murder of John Soper ===
On January 30, 1880, Edward Soper started a literary society near the family home in Kearney, inviting his father to join. Once the elder Soper accepted his invitation, Edward went to hide in a feeding lot, and when he saw his father approaching, he drew his pistol and shot him four times, killing him. Soper then disposed of the murder weapon in a nearby creek, returned to the society and went on to participate in the exercises, acting as if nothing had happened. When the crime was discovered, another man named Thomas Maib was convicted on circumstantial evidence and imprisoned for the murder.

=== Murder of Ardela Hunt and children ===
Soper himself was arrested for horse theft and sentenced to a 2-year prison term in a local penitentiary. After his release, Soper returned to Clay County, where he married 35-year-old Ardela Hunt, a divorcée with two children: 6-year-old Maude and 3-year-old Gillis. While the marriage was generally considered a happy one, Soper and his wife would begin to quarrel after the latter decided to join a local Christian church, to which the former objected, as he was supposedly a spiritualist. On April 21, 1891, while Ardela and the two children were sleeping in their respective rooms at the family farm in Archie, Soper grabbed an axe and proceeded to murder all three of them, bludgeoning them repeatedly.

After killing them, he sat down and wrote several letters, claiming that he had exterminated his family because he could not properly take care of them and would rather have them die than to live in misery. He then locked the doors and proclaimed that he was moving out of town because he had supposedly discovered an illegal saloon, which he considered immoral. Three days after his departure, neighbors broke down the family home to find his wife and children's decomposing bodies. Soon after this discovery, an arrest warrant was issued for Soper, who would remain on the run for several years.

In June 1891, three fishermen found the highly decomposed body of an apparent drowning victim in the Missouri River, which was initially believed to be Soper. After a coroner's inquest, the man's body was erroneously identified as that of Soper, and the case was temporarily closed.

== Move to Oregon, new murder and arrest ==
In the meantime, the real Soper had moved to Albina, Oregon (now a district of Portland), where he lived under the assumed name of R. S. "Sandy" Soper and worked as a car cleaner for the Pullman Company. In 1894, Soper remarried to a woman named Catherine Brownleewe, with whom he had a child, Gilis. For around three years, the trio lived a relatively happy life until one fateful day, when Soper accidentally revealed his real name to his wife.

=== Murder of son ===
On April 16, 1897, under the guise of going to a shoemaker, Soper took his 2-year-old son with him and went out, but never returned home. A few days later, he sent his wife a letter claiming that the child was "placed where it would be well cared for", and asked her not to worry about him. In actuality, Soper had gone to a bank of the Willamette River, where he then threw Gilis into the river and let him drown, before fishing out the corpse and burying it nearby.

=== Arrest ===
For the next month or so, Soper remained on the run, using the alias "Homer Lee" and finding himself a job as a farm hand on a farm in Ashland. He remained under the radar until a police officer from Kansas City, Sam E. Lowe, happened to read about the Portland case in a newspaper. Taking note that the man had the same surname as the supposedly dead Soper, Officer Lowe contacted his brother, a local prosecutor, who used his connections around various towns in Oregon to arrange for Lowe to be dispatched and hunt the fugitive down. After searching for some time, Lowe tracked Soper down to the Ashland farm, where the officer promptly placed Soper under arrest and immediately sought to have Soper extradited back to Missouri. On the way, Soper confessed to killing his wife and three children, but initially denied responsibility for his father's murder. While Soper showed no outward remorse for his deeds, Officer Lowe would later claim that Soper would have nightmares about drowning Gilis, and would exclaim "He can't swim; he can't swim; poor little fellow." upon waking up. After being asked by the medical examiner to say exactly where he had disposed of Gilis' body, Soper provided directions which led to the discovery of the boy's decomposing corpse.

== Trial, imprisonment and execution ==
Due to the severity of his crime in Missouri, Soper was extradited back to the state and charged with killing his wife, to which he pleaded insanity. After a trial that lasted several months, he was convicted and promptly sentenced to death. He later appealed his sentence to the Supreme Court of Missouri, but his appeal was rejected along with that of several other murderers.

On March 30, 1899, Soper was hanged on the gallows in Harrisonville, in front of a crowd of approximately forty people. Prior to his execution, he ate what was described as a "hearty meal", refused any religious counsel and, as his final words, simply said "All is done." His death was likely instantaneous, as an autopsy revealed that his neck was broken after the fall.

== See also ==
- Capital punishment in Missouri
- List of serial killers in the United States

== Works cited ==
=== Books ===
- Gue, B.F. (1903). The pioneer period. History of Iowa from the Earliest Times to the Beginning of the Twentieth Century. Century History Company.
- Wood, Larry (2017). Yanked Into Eternity: Lynchings and Hangings in Missouri. Hickory Press. ISBN 978-0-9702829-8-9.

=== Periodicals ===
- "A Fiend Hung: End of E. Bates Stoper Who Killed Five People". The Birmingham News. Vol. 12, no. 15. Advance Publications. March 30, 1899. p. 1.
- "Better than a Spotter: Sam Lowe's Arrest of Murderer Soper in Oregon Something of a Feather in His Cap". Kansas City Journal. Vol. 40, no. 162. June 11, 1897. p. 1.
- "Is it the Body of Soper?: The Coroner's Supposition Regarding a "Floater"". Kansas City Times. Vol. 11, no. 235. June 18, 1891. p. 1.
- "Officer Lowe's Catch". Kansas City Times. Vol. 54, no. 162. June 11, 1897. p. 3.
- "Soper Pays Death Penalty: Goes to the Scaffold at Harrison without a Tremor". The Kansas City Times. Vol. 58, no. 90. March 31, 1899. p. 5.
- "Guilty of Murder: Soper the Missouri Murderer Found Guilty in the First Degree". Lawrence Daily Journal. Vol. 29, no. 286. December 4, 1897. p. 1.
- "Murdered Bairn of Sandy Soper: The Body of a Baby Recovered After a Long Search". The San Francisco Examiner. Vol. 45, no. 183. June 4, 1897. p. 25.
- "Murderers will be Hanged: Decisions of Supreme Court in Well Known Cases". St. Joseph Gazette. February 22, 1899. p. 1.
- "Wife Murderer Caught: After Many Years Bates Soper is Captured". The St. Joseph Weekly Gazette. Vol. 52, no. 94. June 15, 1897. p. 6.
- "Soper's Fifth Murder: Confesses to Drowning a Son by His Second Wife in Oregon". St. Louis Globe-Democrat. Vol. 23, no. 28. June 17, 1897. p. 5.
- "For Punishment: A Man with Wife and Child Murder to Answer For". The Weekly Gazette-Times. Vol. 10, no. 18. June 6, 1897. p. 1.
