= Chianocco =

Chianocco Cianoch (Piedmontese) Tsanuch (Arpitan)
- Comune
- Comune di Chianocco
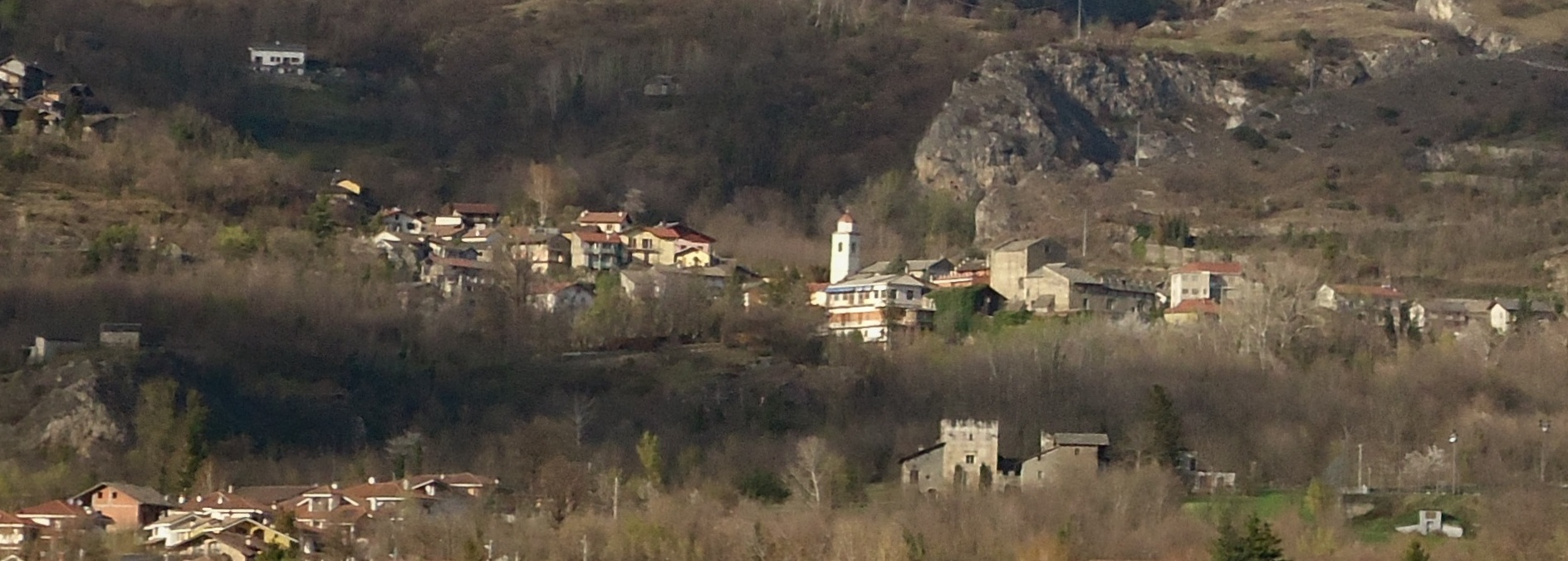
- Panorama

- Coat of arms

- Location within Italy Location within Piedmont
- Coordinates: 45°9′N 7°10′E
- Country: Italy
- Region: Piedmont
- Metropolitan city: Turin (TO)
- Frazioni: Vernetto

Government
  - Mayor: Mauro Russo

Area
  - Total: 18.63 km^{2} (7.19 sq mi)
- Elevation: 550 m (1,800 ft)

Population (31 December 2019)
  - Total: 1,590
  - Density: 85.3/km^{2} (221/sq mi)
- Demonym: Chianocchini
- Time zone: UTC+1 (CET)
  - Summer (DST): UTC+2 (CEST)
- Postal code: 10050
- Dialing code: 0122

Chianocco (Piedmontese: Cianoch, Arpitan: Tsanuch) is a comune (municipality) in the Metropolitan City of Turin in the Italian region Piedmont, located about 45 kilometres (28 mi) west of Turin in the Susa Valley.

Until the Fascist era, it was known as Chianoc.
