= Francisco Guerrero Pérez =

Mexican serial killer

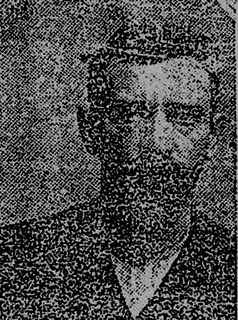
- Born: 1840; The Bajío, Mexico
- Died: November 1910 (age 70); Palacio de Lecumberri, Mexico City, Mexico
- Other names: "El Chalequero" "The Mexican Bluebeard" "The Consulado River Strangler" "The Consulado River Ripper" "The Mexican Ripper"
- Penalty: Death; commuted to 20 years imprisonment

Details
- Victims: 21
- Span of crimes: 1880–1908
- Country: Mexico
- State: Mexico City
- Date apprehended: 1888 and 1908

Francisco Guerrero Pérez (1840 – November 1910), known as El Chalequero (Note: From his habit of forcing himself onto women, local slang was "a chaleco") and other nicknames, was a Mexican serial killer who killed 20 prostitutes in Mexico City from 1880 to 1888, and one final victim in 1908. (Note: Sources differ on whether she was a prostitute or not) Due to his modus operandi, Guerrero was considered an organized, missionary-type killer motivated by hatred, and was frequently compared to Jack the Ripper (whom he predated).

== Early life ==
Francisco Guerrero Pérez was born in 1840 in the Bajío region of Mexico to an impoverished family. He was the eleventh child in the family, and his childhood was marked by poverty, his mother's frequent physical abuse (consisting of beating and suffocating him) and the absence of his father. In 1862, at the age of 22, he emigrated to Mexico City, where he began to work as a shoemaker. He settled in the Peralvillo neighborhood, where he married a woman named María and fathered four children with her, and according to his own claims, he was a devout Catholic who served the Virgin of Guadalupe and proudly told of being a sacristan as a young boy. Guerrero was also known for wearing extravagant yet elegant clothing, with cashmere pants, a charro vest and jacket and multi-colored sashes. An anonymous source described him as "...handsome, elegant, gallant and quarrelsome."

Contrary to his claims of being a religious man, however, Guerrero made no attempts to hide his misogynistic beliefs and was known to have fathered numerous children from extra-marital affairs, leading to rumors that he might have been a pimp. Later on, he also began to openly boast about his murders, but as most of the people in the neighborhood feared him, none denounced him to the authorities.

There are two theories on the origin of the nickname "Chalequero". One says that it was simply because he always used vests, and the other postulates it was because the name "Chalequero" alludes to the Spanish expression "...a puro chaleco", meaning that he made a sexual victim of any woman that he felt attracted to whether they liked him or not.

== Psychiatric profile ==
Guerrero was psychopathic; he lacked empathy and guilt, led a parasitic lifestyle, saw other persons as objects, had inflated self-esteem, was prone to sudden displays of anger, was manipulative and promiscuous, and was superficially charming. At the time, no attention was paid to his diagnosis, but his behavior and personality are consistent with symptoms of a personality disorder, possibly antisocial or narcissistic in nature. In the prison, he was described by the other prisoners as "a silent and quiet person, he cares about his appearance". On one occasion, he wrote a letter to the prison director asking permission for his family to bring him a new pair of pants so that he could, in his words, "dress according to my education".

He saw the female sex as nothing more than a disposable conduit to sexual gratification. His crimes involved hate, showed extreme cruelty and were marked by perversions such as sexual mutilation. He violated his victims to show the superiority and power that, according to him, he held over the women. Almost all of his victims were prostitutes; he did not kill them because of their work, however, but because they were vulnerable.

=== Contemporary profile ===
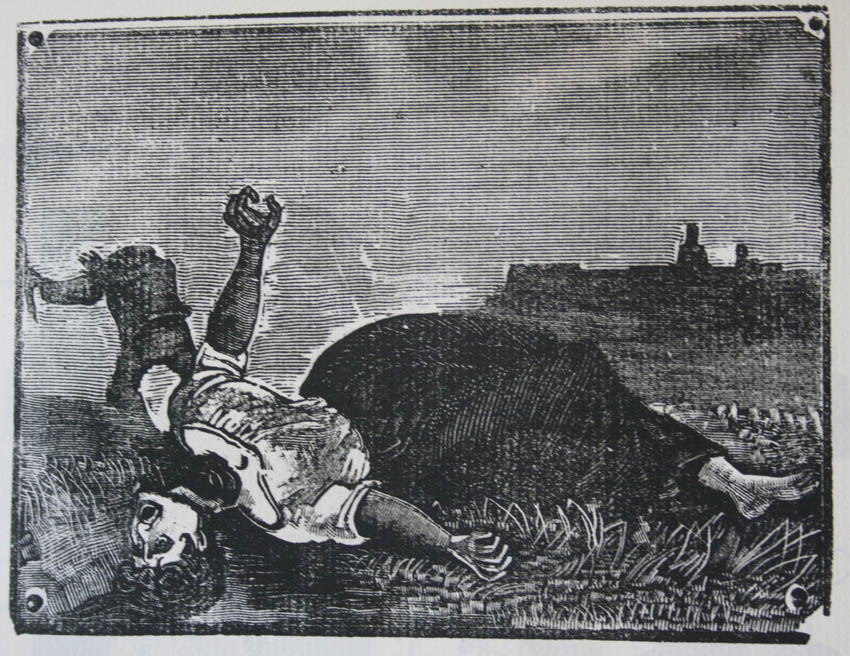
Engraving by José Guadalupe Posada portraying one of the victims

Based on the theories of Cesare Lombroso, a prominent criminologist at the time, the detectives devised a profile of the murderer: they classified him as a "born criminal" (Note: According to Lombroso, "born criminals were individuals who were born into a low social stratum and belonged to a certain ethnic group, the product of an involuntary process in which there are generations exposed to a certain environment inhabited by their ancestors that makes them degenerate to basic animalistic instincts) who was likely poor, illiterate, socially decadent, with below average intelligence, a dark complexion (either mestizo or indigenous ancestry), robust and coarse, markedly masculine and with simian features.

Carlos Roumagnac, one of the first Mexican criminologists, concluded that the "Consulado River Ripper" was a born criminal:

"...there isn't sufficient information by which to suppose that (...) the Chalequero committed his crimes motivated by an irresistible sexual compulsion (..) he didn't commit it by a sexual impulse (...) he committed it by conscious and violent impulse (...) he's a violent degenerate."

— Roumagnac, Carlos; 1906

After his arrest, a re-evaluation was made of the original profile in regard to Guerrero's physical description and his behavior towards others - he was considered polite and even gentlemanly, which he used to lull his victims into a false sense of security. In addition, his highly organized modus operandi made psychologists reconsider the supposition that he was of below average intelligence. Because of this, it was not until 1908 that a group of journalists portrayed him in a different manner: a slender man of dark complexion, of medium height, scrupulously groomed in the Western manner, with a refined and gallant demeanor, and with his only outwardly telling sign being a penetrating and vacant stare.

== Murders ==
=== Modus operandi ===
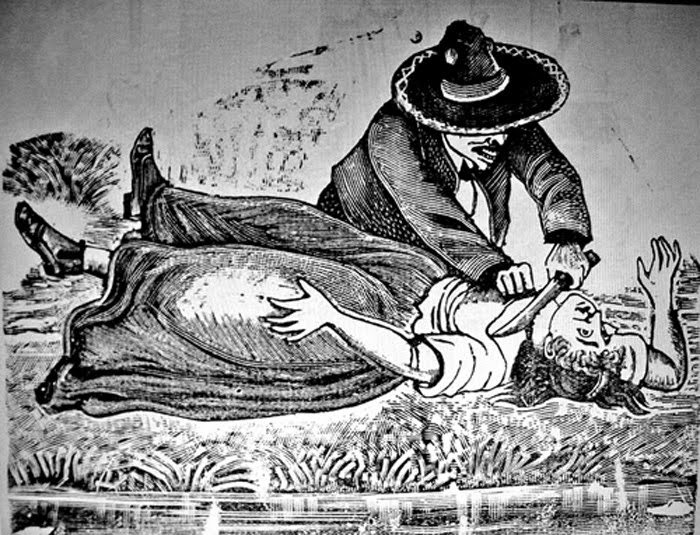
Engraving by José Guadalupe Posada illustrating Guerrero murdering a victim

Guerrero approached his victims under the pretext of making use of their services, and afterwards, he would threaten and rape them. When it came to murdering his victims, he would either strangle or slit their throats - for unexplained reasons, he would occasionally decapitate them. Guerrero would then use a knife to skin his victims, using the skin in his trade as a shoemaker, ultimately throwing the bodies into the Consulado River. Due to his similarity with Jack the Ripper, the Mexican media frequently made comparisons between the two cases.

In 1908, a graphic report of one of the attacks attributed to Guerrero was published by a prostitute named Lorenza Urrutía. According to her account, she had met Guerrero near the railroad tracks in the Peralvillo neighborhood, whereupon he asked if she had a light for his cigarette. When she approached, he pulled out a knife and threatened her, forcing her to accompany him to a nearby secluded area. Urrutía claimed that she managed to escape by telling him that she needed to go pick up some money, allowing her a chance to escape. Two months later, she would meet Guerrero again, but failed to escape him this time - she alleged that Guerrero dragged her to a cave far from town where he raped and tortured her for two days. On this occasion, Urrutía managed to escape while her assailant went out to buy some pulque.

== Arrests and trials ==
=== Initial murders ===
From 1880 to 1888, the mutilated, battered and dismembered corpses of women began to appear on the banks of the Consulado River. This lasted until February 13, 1888, when Guerrero was arrested by detective Francisco Chávez, who had been informed by several neighbors and Urrutía that one of the murder victims, Murcia Gallardo, was seen in Guerrero's company. Gallardo was a poor prostitute whose body, showing signs of rape and with a slit throat, was found on the banks of the Consulado River in early 1888. Although he was known for bragging about his crimes to the locals, Guerrero categorically denied responsibility during his arrest, but declared to the authorities that his favorite book was The Mysteries of Paris by French author Eugène Sue.

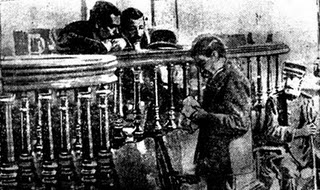
Guerrero's first trial

In the aftermath of his arrest, a new complaint was filed against Guerrero by a washerwoman named Emilia, who claimed that she had been raped by him near the Consulado River after returning from a pilgrimage to the town of La Santísima near Villa de Guadalupe. After the rape, she had been left for dead on the riverbank.

Although the military regime censored most news reports about the crimes, the case grew to such infamy that it became known far and wide across the country. At the end of the first trial, Guerrero was solely convicted for the murder of Gallardo and the assault on Emilia, as prosecutors were unable to conclusively prove his guilt in the other crimes. Subsequently, Guerrero was sentenced to death, but his sentence was overturned by Porfirio Díaz himself, who ordered that it be changed to 20 years imprisonment instead. As a result, the convict was transferred to the San Juan de Uluá Prison, where he remained until he was pardoned in 1904.

=== Final murder ===
A few years after his release, Guerrero was arrested yet again on June 13, 1908, this time for the murder of an elderly woman. The victim was never fully identified, with only her first name, Antonia, being known. She had been killed in a similar manner to Guerrero's previous victims, as her throat had been slit and her body dumped on the banks of the Consulado River - when pressed for a motive, Guerrero claimed that she had 'angered' him.

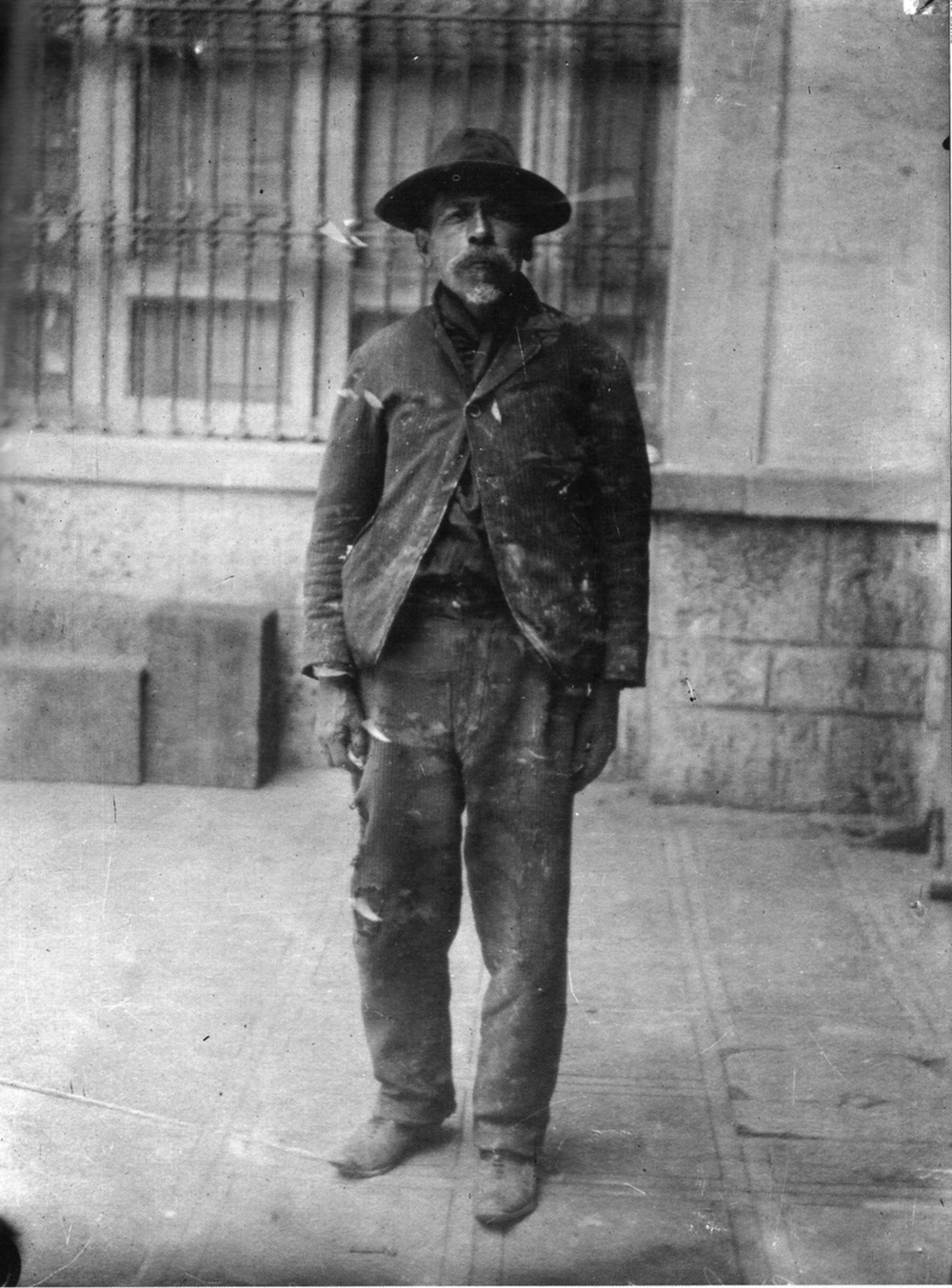
Photograph of Guerrero taken in 1910 inside Lecumberri Prison, on his 70th birthday

This time, however, Guerrero made multiple mistakes that led to his arrest - a young shepherd, José Inés Rodríguez, who had been herding cattle nearby when he heard the screams of a woman, hid in some bushes and witnessed the murder take place in its entirety. Additionally, two other women - the Solorio sisters - had seen him clean off the blood on his arms, face and thorax on the riverbank, not far from the crime scene itself. And finally, a reporter who had covered the original murders had noticed the similarity between the new murder and the previous ones, and immediately denounced him to the authorities.

== Imprisonment and death ==
Guerrero's arrest was met without much fanfare, but his trial attracted the attention of more than 2,000 spectators. He was found guilty of Antonia's murder and sentenced to death yet again, but this time, no governing authority intervened with the sentence. As a result, he was transferred to Lecumberri Prison to await execution, where he spent most of his time reading the novel Paul et Virginie by French author Jacques-Henri Bernardin de Saint-Pierre. The sentence was never carried out, as he died in November 1910, shortly after the start of the Mexican Revolution.

Sources differ on the cause of death - some accounts claim that he died from tuberculosis; others say it was from typhoid and yet more claimed it was a contusion suffered in the aftermath of an accident. The true cause of Guerrero's death remains unclear to this day, with the only confirmed pathological sign being a cerebral embolism. He was found unconscious in his cell and was transported to the Juárez Hospital, but never regained consciousness. Reportedly, Guerrero never showed signs of remorse about his actions and remained unrepentant up until his death.

== In pop culture ==
His crimes have since been dramatized in Bernardo Esquinca's novel Carne 1de Ataud, as well as two engravings by renowned artist José Guadalupe Posada.

== See also ==
- Jack the Ripper
- List of serial killers nicknamed "Bluebeard"
- List of serial killers by country
- List of serial killers by number of victims
