= Athelstan Braxton Hicks =

English coroner (1854–1902)

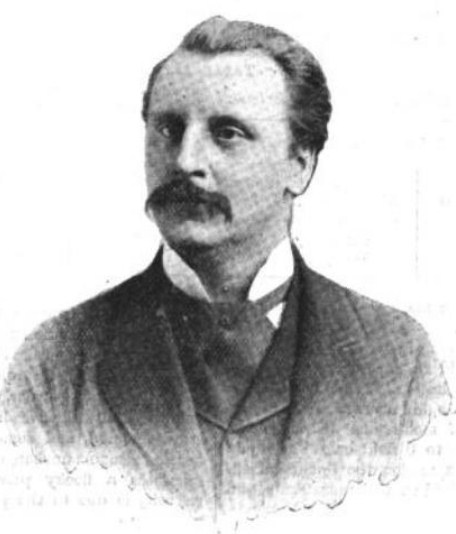
- Born: Athelstan Braxton Hicks; 19 June 1854; Tottenham, London, England
- Died: 17 May 1902 (aged 47)
- Education: Middle Temple; Guy's Hospital
- Occupation: Coroner
- Employer(s): British Medical Association; Coroners Society
- Known for: Innovating post-mortem autopsy procedures and investigating causes of premature infant death and Pimlico poisoning
- Father: John Braxton Hicks

Athelstan Braxton Hicks (19 June 1854 – 17 May 1902) was a coroner in London and Surrey for two decades at the end of the 19th century. He was given the nickname "The Children's Coroner" for his conscientiousness in investigating the suspicious deaths of children, and especially baby farming and the dangers of child life insurance. He would later publish a study on infanticide.

== Career ==
Hicks was a barrister at law who entered the Middle Temple in 1872 and was called to the bar in 1875. He was a special pleader on the Western Circuit and at the Middlesex Sessions. He was for some time a student at Guy's Hospital, where he gained considerable knowledge of medical jurisprudence. He was Deputy Coroner of the City of London and Borough of Southwark, the City of Westminster and the West London District. He was appointed Coroner in 1885 for the South-Western District of London and the Kingston Division of Surrey. For a time he served on the Joint Committee of the British Medical Association and the Coroners Society, of which he was honorary Secretary.

He wrote a pamphlet entitled "Hints to Medical Men Concerning the Granting of Certificates of Death" (London: William Clowes, 1889).

He made several reforms, notably that inquests were no longer held in public houses, and an improvement in providing local mortuaries.

He insisted that a full post-mortem be carried out on bodies. In 1898 he took a doctor, James Mackay, to court for perjury; Mackay had claimed to have performed a post-mortem on a 17-week child but when two other doctors examined the body they found no evidence that Mackay had done so.

Some of his more unusual inquests were the Pimlico poisoning by chloroform, the inquest on a body of a baby sent to the Home Secretary, the 'Lambeth Poisoning Case', the 'Tooting Horror', and the "Railway Murder" of Miss Camp.

One of his inquests, Elizabeth Jackson, has been linked, probably incorrectly, with the Jack the Ripper murders.

In the case of the 'Lambeth Gangs' he dealt with the murder of Henry Mappin by a street gang, the original Hooligans, who threatened witnesses and himself.

In the 'Battersea Cancer Cure' inquest he dealt with an unqualified "Dr Ferdinand" who advertised his claim to be able to cure cancer. It was not until the Cancer Act 1939 that advertisements for cancer cures were made illegal.

At the end of the 19th century there were more suicides from carbolic acid than from any other poison because there was no restriction on its sale. Braxton Hicks and other coroners called for its sale to be prohibited.

He gave evidence in 1890 and 1896 to the Select Committee on the Infant Life Protection Act, 1872.

In 1899 Braxton Hicks wrote to the Home Secretary, Sir Matthew White Ridley, about the Police Order issued by the Metropolitan Commissioner of Police, Sir Edward Bradford, and the recovery of bodies in the Thames. In 1900 he succeeded in a reform of coroners being notified of the deaths of lunatics held in Poor Law Institutions.

In the Kingston District in 1901 he held 201 inquests: 121 males and 79 females with one case of treasure trove. The verdicts were murder four (three newborn children), manslaughter one, suicide 23, accidental 51, suffocated in bed four, found drowned 10, excessive drinking 13, want of attention at birth three. Infants under one year accounted for 42 of these. There were also 810 inquests in the South-Western district.

=== Infanticide ===
Infanticide was common in the Victorian period for social reasons, such as illegitimacy, and the introduction of child life insurance additionally encouraged some women to kill their children for gain. Examples are Mary Ann Cotton, who murdered many of her 15 children as well as three husbands; Margaret Waters, the 'Brixton Baby Farmer', a professional baby-farmer who was found guilty of infanticide in 1870; Jessie King, hanged in 1889; and Amelia Dyer, the 'Angel Maker', who murdered over 400 babies in her care.

Finding the dead bodies of murdered babies on the streets was common; 276 were recorded in London in 1870. Braxton Hicks held many inquests for bodies of children found in the street or on the banks of the Thames, such as in the 'Battersea Mystery', where the body of a baby was found by the Thames after being thrown into the water alive. The father was found guilty of manslaughter and sentenced to 20 years. This was unusual; for example, in the inquest of newborn baby that died of head injuries, the jury concluded that there was not sufficient evidence on its cause.

In many cases of infanticide the jury returned verdicts of wilful murder against some person or persons unknown but the police could not identify the child's parents. In another inquest in 1891 on the body of a baby girl found in the Thames "we have had about ten similar cases" where "as soon as the child is born, its head is knocked all to pieces and the body is then thrown into the river".

Obtaining convictions for the manslaughter of infants was difficult. For example, the case of Matilda Muncey, a registered baby farmer, who had had 36 children of whom 12 had died. She had an unregistered child, Evelina Marsh, who died of malnutrition. She was acquitted of manslaughter and was only fined £5 for neglecting to register the child and sent to prison for a month for not giving information to the coroner. The judge commented "that nothing was more likely to kill or more difficult of proof than the improper way of feeding."

==== Ada Chard-Williams ====
The 1898 inquest on the body of a three-month-old girl who was strangled, "one of a series of cases in which children other than newly-born infants had recently been murdered and thrown away." There were other similar cases. He carried out the inquest on Selina Jones, whose body was washed up on the Thames at Battersea in 1899, and had been strangled by Ada Chard-Williams, a baby farmer who was later hanged at Newgate prison.

==== Amy Gregory ====
Braxton Hicks held the inquest in 1895 on the death of Frances Maud Gregory, aged six weeks, the child of Amy Gregory (23), whose dead body was found on the ice in the Old Deer Park, Richmond. The mother was convicted of strangling her illegitimate child but granted a reprieve from execution by the Home Secretary. There were calls for more lenient sentences for infanticide leading to the comment "one reason why in all ages infanticide has been so lightly regarded is that it is a crime of which no man can in his own person by possibility be a victim. It is quite right that Amy Gregory should not be hanged; but the further cry that she should not be punished, is a plea that all women should be absolute over the lives of their little children." "Are we really going half-mad with pity for everybody except the totally defenceless? If not, why in the name of Christianity, as well as common-sense, do we object to the Home Secretary protecting babies of three months from being throttled?"

==== Overlaying ====
Overlaying, where the child is accidentally smothered in bed, was common especially in overcrowded conditions or where the parents had been drinking. Braxton Hicks announced that he would disallow the expenses of the parents where he thought that the parents had been careless.

At an inquest in 1895 on the death by over-laying of a second child to a couple who had earlier received a caution, when the jury returned a verdict of accidental death he said

Very well, Mrs Wigden, you can go on smothering your children as much as you like, the jury says. The foreman says it was pure accident, and the jury says, after all these warnings, it doesn't matter. Well, gentlemen, if you think that is a proper thing to do, by all means say it was an accident, but we may as well hold no inquests at all – it is a perfect farce.

There had been "during the last ten months no less than 500 cases had occurred in which children had been suffocated while in bed with their parents, in London alone." He estimated that a third of the allegedly accidental deaths of children were due to suffocations.

However, he operated a poor box and could be generous when confronted with poverty: "it was no use reading the father a lesson on sleeping in a crowded room, for he was hard-up and could not pay for large apartments. The jury returned a verdict of "Accidental death," and expressed its opinion that the father had done the best he could in the circumstances."

==== Friendly Societies Act 1875 ====
In 1889 Mr Braxton Hicks wrote a letter to The Times about the dangers of child life insurance, as outlined in the Friendly Societies Act 1875 (38 & 39 Vict. c. 60) which provided for payments on death of children, denouncing the practice of insuring children's lives to pay the expenses of their burial. He wrote that the insurances act as a temptation to the parents to neglect them, or feed them with improper food, and sometimes even to kill them, as in the excessively numerous cases of "over-laying" or suffocating in bed.

Infantile Insurance

Some people assert, rather rashly, that the deaths of a great number of infants are directly due to the fact of their being insured, or, in other words, that children are deliberately murdered for the insurance money; but, except in a few cases, insurance is only one of the possible causes which lead to the deaths of infants.

If parents are negligent to their children, the fact that they are insured must naturally act upon an evil mind as a direct inducement for further negligence. Or, if an infant is sickly, there is an inducement to allow "nature to take its course," which it does, if the child is insured, in a very speedy manner.

The industrial insurance companies allow policies to be effected by people who have no insurable interest (properly so called) in the lives of the insured. They are effected by persons who have a direct interest in the death of the insured—such as illegitimate children, children of poor people who have large families, and aged people whose life is a burden to those who have the care of them.

As regards illegitimate children, I am informed that it is the rule in some offices not to take such lives; but I know of my own knowledge that this rule is almost invariably broken.

Children are often insured whose lives are in a precarious state, and insurances are effected by people who have the charge of such children to nurse for a weekly payment; but such insurances are not effected until there seems a reasonable chance of the child dying and the payments of the mother are in arrear, so that on its death—and the sooner that occurs the better it will be—the nurse will be able to recoup herself for the loss out of the insurance money. Again, the agents for the companies are paid by commission, and though, no doubt, that is the only practicable mode of payment, commercially speaking, yet it has a direct inducement for their taking insurances with very little inquiry. A frequent cause of death in children is what is called "Exhaustion from malnutrition," and the method by which this is brought about is so simple that it is no wonder it often occurs. All the parents have to do is to stuff the child with improper food; the more they give it the weaker it gets; and then, when it can eat nothing liquid, they tell you that they give it what they have themselves, beef, pork, &c., and are then surprised, or pretend to be surprised, that the child dies.

It is impossible in such a case to determine absolutely if such feeding is done purposely or from ignorance; but the impression in my mind, formed from such cases, is that in the majority there is a great deal of method, as, although these people may be uneducated, they are quite cunning enough to know that such a treatment can be carried out with impunity, and I have known them to continue such a course of treatment even after being warned by a medical man as to the probable results.

Another frequent cause of death in infants is from "Suffocation while in bed with the parents." Out of 103 inquests held last year in which a verdict of "Accidental death" was returned, 32 were on children who had so died. This is clearly a preventible cause, and with a little extra care from the parents the majority would not have occurred. Yet several of these children were insured, and the parents were enabled to take advantage of their own carelessness by receiving the insurance money.

There are many cases where children are insured and die from the results of malnutrition and general carelessness and neglect in their bringing up who, when they are nearly approaching death, are brought to a medical man, who sees them, often only once, but who gives a certificate of death because he is satisfied that they have died from what is improperly termed a natural cause, without any inquiry as to how they were allowed to get into that condition. Such cases are stated by medical men to be marasmus or wasting, inanition, want of vitality, malnutrition.

All these are vague terms and are utterly valueless in such cases, unless the medical man states whether such a cause is brought about from constitutional weakness or from want of proper care. If a medical man has no knowledge of the primary cause he should state on the certificate of death that be does not know, and then the Registrar would refer the matter for inquiry.

In many of such cases the child is simply taken to a doctor to obtain the certificate of death, and so buried, without any further inquiry. It is this practice which allows an opportunity to parents to hide their neglect, and therefore any statistics based upon coroners' returns would be wholly fallacious. In fact, any statistics in the matter of infantile insurance are apt to mislead and draw the attention of the public away from the main question – as to whether infant insurance in its present state is a good or bad thing.

The strongest statement in favour of infant insurance is that it encourages thrift and induces parents to spend more money in the care of a child while alive, if it is insured, than they would do if it was not insured. But where is the evidence of the thrift? The parent is putting by money for which he can get no return unless the child dies, and then the amount paid is wholly out of proportion to the amount invested, and the matter, commercially, assumes a gambling aspect, the stake in this game being the life of the child.

It is urged in favour that the parent is more likely to provide extra food and delicacies for a child who is insured, as he knows that if it dies he will be able to reimburse himself somewhat by the insurance money. But surely the argument tends directly against the policy of the system, for it would be patent to any thinking person if a parent argued upon the matter at all he would argue in this manner:---My child's life is insured; if I spend extra money on medical advice and proper food I may keep my child alive, and so I shall have no benefit from my insurance and shall have spend my money and premiums for no advantage; but if I neglect to get proper food and advice the child will die, and I shall have saved my money and be in pocket from the insurance.

The reason that so many children who are insured do not die is not because insurance is a good thing but because the majority of parents do not argue the matter at all but do their duty by their children to the best of their ability without any reference to insurance. So it is not really a question of thrift in parents that causes them to insure, but because they have been told by the insurance agents that it would be a good thing to insure in case the child dies, and as they can do so for Id. per week they often insure; but with the evil-disposed it would be a direct inducement to neglect and kill their children, and, to quote be words of the Hon. E. L. Stanley, in his evidence before the commission, speaking of canvassers, he says, "I do not think the work could be done without them. I think it is a sort of canvassing work among the poor; they go among these people and persuade them; they say you ought to be economical and thrifty; you ought to provide for your family." They carry on a propaganda which I should call extravagant thrift.

He then listed eleven proposals for amending the act:

1. That no child should be insured under the age of at least five years, or, if insured, that no money should be paid if it died under the age of five years.
2. That the amount to be paid on such deaths should be commensurate with the expenses of the burial.
3. That in no case should the amount to be paid for burial exceed the sum of £2 10s.
4. That only parents should be allowed to insure, and then only when the child is in their care and charge.
5. That if the child attains the age of 16 years it should be compulsory on insurance companies to give a surrender value for the policy. This would encourage thrift in the parent, for by the time the child was 16 years it would, presumably, be able to contribute towards its own keep, and the parent could then recoup himself for the expenses he might have been put to in insuring against the possible death of his child, or, should he be so minded, he might use the money for furthering the child's interests.
6. That after the age of 16 years the child might be allowed to continue the policy for his own benefit (if it has not been surrendered) for the same or an increased amount.
7. Should the child die under the age of five years, the insurers should be allowed, if they desire it, to receive back a certain proportion of the premiums. This would be no greater loss to the companies than the present system of paying in full the insurance money at any age.
8. That in each district the insurance companies should appoint an undertaker, who should conduct the funeral of all children insured on behalf of the company, and themselves defray all such expenses and account to the company for the same, thus preventing any cash payments being made the friends.
9. That the deaths of all children whose lives are insured should be reported to the coroner in the same way as under the Infant Life Protection Act, not of necessity that an inquest should be held, but that an inquiry should be made by the coroner's officer as to the circumstances surrounding the death, who should report the matter to the coroner for his decision as to the necessity of holding any further inquiry, and that no such death should be registered without the authority in writing of the coroner.
10. That where the coroner and his jury consider that the child has been improperly treated, though such treatment may not amount in law to negligence sufficient to maintain manslaughter, the coroner shall be empowered to endorse the same upon his certificate of death, and thus give notice to the insurance companies that no money was to be paid upon such death.
11. That the present rules as regards the certificate of the registrar to the insurance companies to prevent multiple insurances should be retained.

He gave evidence in 1890 to the Committee of the House of Lords investigating Child Life Insurance. The recent Deptford poisoning case, where Mrs Winters had poisoned three people and set up multiple insurance policies, was raised.

The Friendly Societies Act 1896 subsequently did bring in limitations on the amount payable on the death of a child.

=== Stillbirth ===
He also commented on the lack of recording of stillborn babies. Under British law stillborn babies were not registered and were not required to be buried in public burial grounds. Recording a birth as stillborn saved on funeral expenses and was a way of concealing infanticide. Undertakers would often store the bodies of stillborn babies for burial in adults' coffins for a small fee.

He subsequently had the coffin re-opened to enable the doctor to carry out his orders, and then it was discovered that the bodies of two newly-born children were also in the coffin—one at the head of the man, and the other at his feet—both being in a very bad state of decomposition. He ordered the bodies to be detained with a view to ascertaining who was responsible. It now appeared that it was the common practice of undertakers to receive the bodies of newly-born children, and to keep them in their shops for some considerable time, and the man in question had had these bodies for a month. If undertakers' shops were to continue to be the receptacles for newly-born children, it would become a public scandal and a nuisance to the neighbourhood; and of course it was a most horrible practice. Then there was another danger. How was an undertaker always to know that they were newly-born children? He had known undertakers receive the bodies of children on the "rough scribble" of some midwife, and they would take and bury them on the strength of that piece of paper and nothing more. He had convinced himself in this case, on the certificates of two medical men, that these children ware both stillborn. It seemed to him that public attention should be called to the hiatus in the Registration Act which did not require stillborn children to be registered. So far as the Act was concerned, stillborn children could be deposited at any corner and buried without any inquiry at all. He had known children from three to six days old to die and to be called stillborn, and then some midwife had explained that she thought any child dying within a week of its birth was to be regarded as stillborn. When they dealt with people as ignorant as that, they must expect a good deal of crime to go on under tho cloak of ignorance. He had insisted on the undertaker being present, and the man would now have to bury the bodies and to satisfy him that they had been buried. In his opinion the State should cause still-births to be registered, and some record should be kept. Unless a medical man could certify that the child was stillborn, the matter should be reported to the coroner. Then they would have some check on the large number of child murders committed in England.

The British Medical Journal in 1895 noted that "It is of the first importance that the disposal of the body of a stillborn child should be made as difficult as possible, and for this purpose the registration of all stillbirths, whether premature or not, should be made compulsory. The reckless indifference to child life which leaves stillborn children to be buried in the back garden or cast out upon the dust heap, and their births left unregistered is purely English, and would not be tolerated in any other civilised country."

Registration was finally required by the Births and Deaths Registration Act 1926.

==== Amelia Hollis ====
Braxton Hicks held inquests for two babies that were delivered by Amelia Hollis, a midwife, that were shown to have been suffocated after birth.

I may as well tell you at once that I have had a post mortem examination made, and the doctor says that the child had lived and was suffocated. Yet you certified that it was stillborn. You are not fit to be a midwife. I have had too many cases of "stillborn" from you and your daughter lately.

He was active against uncertified midwives and the dangers of midwives issuing certificates of stillbirth that could conceal infanticide. "At present it is the easiest thing in the world to dispose of an infant without anyone in authority being in the faintest degree wiser. Many newly-born infants are allowed to die, or are even murdered by the midwife who attends these houses, and it is positively this very interested individual who gives the certificate of still-birth."

He gave evidence in 1893 to the select committee about requiring the registration of stillbirths and the dangers of unregistered lying-in houses.

Obtaining manslaughter convictions for suffocating babies, which were then passed off as stillborn, was very difficult, as in the case of the death of Ernest Davy where Hollis was only found to have infringed the Registration Act by recording a stillbirth. Often women would have the charge reduced to concealment of birth. As noted by The Spectator in the Amy Gregory case "this is not one of the cases, unhappily so frequent, of infanticide, in which a mother distracted with shame and fear, has murdered her child almost at the moment of birth, and in which, by a conspiracy of mercy among Judges, doctors, and jurymen, a verdict is always returned of guilty only of concealment of birth."

==== Massacre of the Innocents ====
In 1895 The Sun published an article "Massacre of the Innocents" highlighting the dangers of baby-farming, in the recording of stillbirths and quoting Braxton-Hicks on lying-in houses. "I have not the slightest doubt that a large amount of crime is covered by the expression 'still-birth'. There are a large number of cases of what are called newly-born children, which are found all over England, more especially in London and large towns, abandoned in streets, rivers, on commons, and so on. My opinion is that a great deal of that crime is due to what are called lying-in houses, which are not registered, or under the supervision of that sort, where the people who act as midwives constantly, as soon as the child is born, either drop it into a pail of water or smother it with a damp cloth. It is a very common thing, also, to find that they bash their heads on the floor and break their skulls. And it is a peculiar coincidence in these matters that at certain times we will have a concurrence of new-born children found, and their deaths all arising during a certain period of time in exactly the same way."

As noted by the British Medical Journal:

"The Infant Life Protection Act 1872, was an attempt to deal with this evil, but it still continues. and it is now apparent that "adoption," "baby farming," starvation, and child murder, are but the smoke showing the existence of another crime smouldering still deeper in modern society, and are but the efforts to get rid of what one may call the failures of the abortion monger—children born alive and viable, sometimes from delay on the mother's part, sometimes from the fear of the consequences, or perhaps from some trace of humanity holding the employer back from giving the fatal order, often, it is to be feared, because "adoption" is cheaper in ready cash than murder during birth, which, as we are informed by the Sun, runs to £40 or £50."

=== Baby farming ===
He was active against the practise of baby-farming. The Infant Life Protection Act 1872 had made registration with the local authority obligatory for any person taking in two or more infants under one year of age for a period greater than 24 hours. Also the coroner had to be informed of the deaths of such infants.

In a reported case of baby farming Braxton Hicks said "Any child that dies in your quarter, where the cause is not as plain as a pike-staff, shall have an inquest held, and I'll have this case brought before the Children's Society."

The problem with the Infant Life Protection Act 1872 was that there were widespread exemptions, including relatives, day-nurses, hospitals and foster women. There was no 'authentification' of contracts between parent and baby-farmer. This was highlighted by the Arnold baby-farming inquest. He wrote to the Home Secretary about the case and in 1896 gave evidence to the Select Committee on Infant Life Protection Bill, with the Arnold case as one example.

==== The Arnold baby-farming case ====
Mrs Jane Arnold of Wolverton had been 'sweating' infants legally by doing so one at a time. She would take a lump sum for adoption and then pass the child on. She left a child with Mrs Saunders of Richmond and used her address for replies. Her activities came to light in an inquest in 1888 on the death of Isaac Arnold (alias John Bailey), aged 6 months, who died in Tooting. Arnold had placed the boy with Mrs Jessie Chapman of Tooting, who was licensed under the Infant Life Protection Act 1872, and had already received another child, Edward Alexander Lovell, from her. Mrs Chapman notified the coroner. The jury returned a verdict of death from natural causes, but the activities of Mrs Arnold had been reported and were influential in leading to a change in the law. Braxton Hicks noted that she had had at least 25 infants and in his summing up he said:

The Metropolitan Board of Works, who had the carrying out of the Act, had found the section did not go far enough. It was suggested in 1884 that the operations of the Act should be extended to infants under five years of age, and that parents should not be relieved of their responsibility by the payment of sums of money to the people who undertook to adopt their children. In his opinion, then, it was desirable to amend the Infant Life Protection Act, 1872, in the manner suggested by the Metropolitan Board of Works, and in addition to make it an offence to take for hire or reward any infant under the age of seven years, unless such person was registered under the Act, or unless the particulars of the agreement or undertaking entered into between the parties to the transaction were registered by the local authority under such Act.

In 1889 Mrs Arnold was again involved in the inquest of Edward Alexander Lovell, aged 2½, who died in an emaciated state at Newport Pagnell. The child had been received from a Mrs Williams of High Holborn, London when a month old with a payment of £30 for a year's keep. The boy was then handed over to Chapman in Thornton Heath, London, but when she did not receive her payments she returned the boy to Mrs Arnold. The jury were of the "opinion that there has been gross neglect in the case" but were unable to allocate responsibility. They added the rider that: "The jury are strongly of opinion that further legislation in what are usually known as baby farming cases is greatly needed, and particularly that the required legislation should extend to the care of one infant only, and that the age of the infant should not be limited to one year, but rather to five years and that it should be an offence for any person undertaking the care of such infant to sub farm it."

The Infant Life Protection Act 1897 finally empowered local authorities to control the registration of nurses responsible for more than one infant under the age of five for a period longer than 48 hours. Under the Children Act 1908 "no infant could be kept in a home that was so unfit and so overcrowded as to endanger its health, and no infant could be kept by an unfit nurse who threatened, by neglect or abuse, its proper care and maintenance."

=== Accidental death ===
Other causes of death were also dealt with.

Dr. Wynn Westcott said that in 1889 records showed that 620 children were burned to death through being unattended. The Coroners' Society had appealed to the Home Secretary for assistance, and the Government was considering the advisability of legislation to enable a fine or term of imprisonment to be imposed on any person who left a child alone, if that child was thereby burned to death. The jury returned a verdict of "accidental death," and expressed their concurrence with the coroner. The mother was censured for her "thoughtless want of care." Recently Mr. Braxton Hicks, at Kingston-on-Thames, inquired into the death of a little girl who was severely burnt at school owing to the want of a proper fireguard. Commenting on the circumstances, the coroner remarked that during the last couple of years he has held inquests on 1683 children, whose death was due to burns, and in 1426 of these cases there were no fireguards.

The Children Act 1908 introduced legislation for the use of domestic fireguards.

In 1897 he was the principal witness before the Select Committee on Petroleum describing how the Coroners' Society wanted restrictions on the sale of cheap and dangerous paraffin lamps. He later wrote to The Morning Post about the safety standards of paraffin lamps.

At an inquest on a boating accident at Kew in which two men, Cazaly and Geraty, drowned, he "referred to the carelessness and indifference of watermen in letting out small boats to persons who possessed no knowledge of rowing", which led to the licensing of small boats.

He also campaigned for the control of the sale of poisons.

== Personal life ==
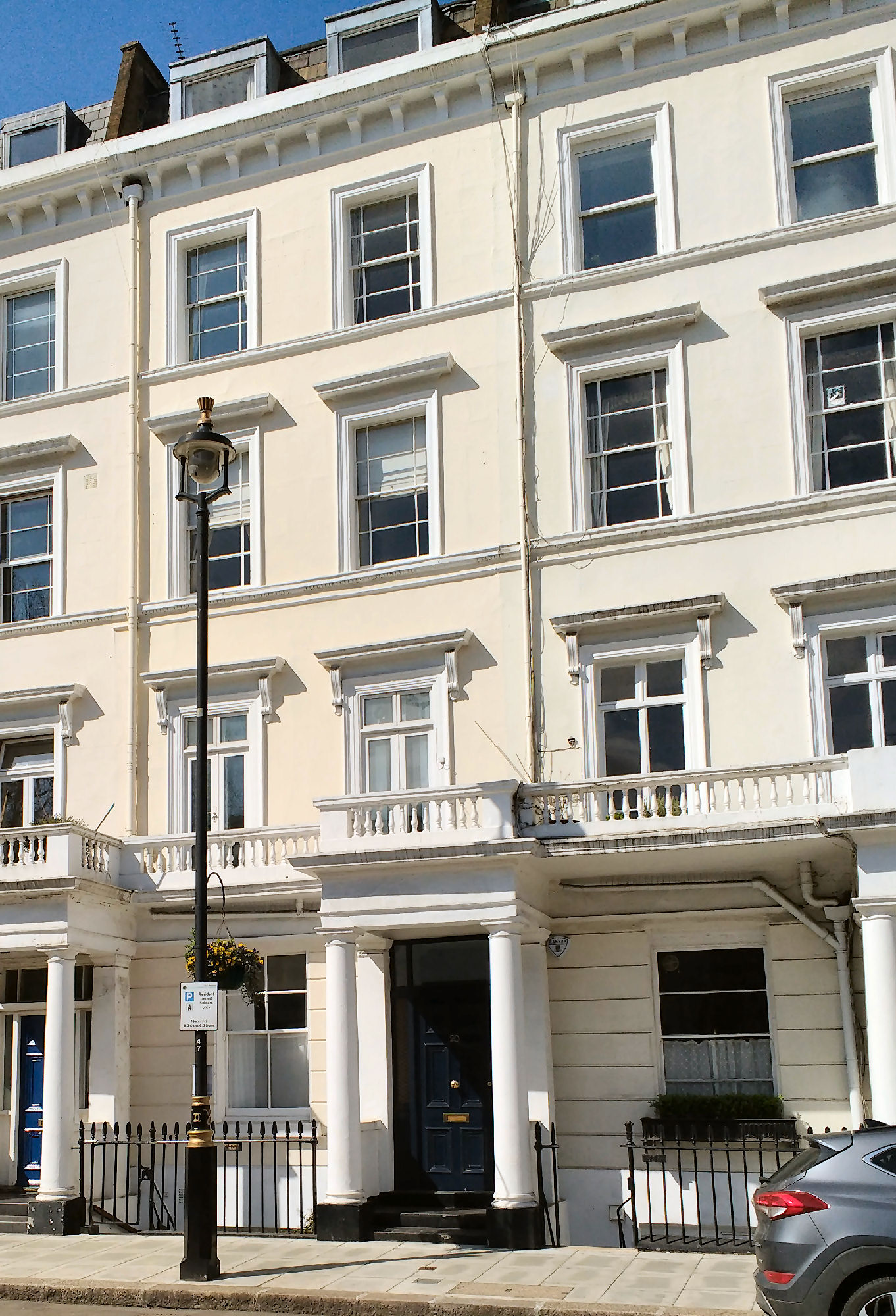
Home in Lupus Street

Hicks was born in Tottenham, London, the son of John Braxton Hicks, a prominent obstetrician.

He married Fanny Sarah Sutton, daughter of Dr Sutton, in 1883 at St Gabriel's Church, Warwick Square. They had a daughter and a son, the pathologist John Athelstan Braxton Hicks M.D., M.R.C.P. (1885–1935).

He took a keen interest in promoting swimming for children and was president of the Battersea Swimming Club.

He died on 17 May 1902 at his home in Lupus Street, Pimlico, from pneumonia. Following a service at St Gabriel's Church his funeral was at Norwood Cemetery on 21 May 1902.

DEATH OF MR BRAXTON HICKS

We regret to announce the death of Mr Athelstan Braxton Hicks, coroner for the South-Western district of London and the Kingston Division of Surrey, who passed away on Saturday afternoon at his residence, 20 Lupus-street, S.W., from pneumonia, after an illness of less than a week's duration. Mr Hicks, who was in his forty-eighth year, was the son of the late Dr John Braxton Hicks, the famous obstetric surgeon, and was called to the Bar in Trinity term, 1875. For some time he was special pleader on the Western Circuit and at the Middlesex Sessions. Prior to his appointment as coroner seventeen years ago he was deputy coroner for the City of London and borough of Southwark, the City of Westminster, and the West London District. He had for some years been hon. Secretary of the Coroners' Society of England and Wales. Mr Hicks held many notable inquests, including the Pimlico poisoning case, the case in which a clergyman sent the dead body of a child to Sir William Harcourt, the then Home Secretary, to call his attention to the local burial scandal; the murder of Miss Camp on the South-Western Railway, the murder of Mr Pearson on the South-Western Railway, and the cancer case at Battersea. Mr Hicks held his last inquest at Lambeth on Saturday week, when he complained of the chilliness of the court, and two days previous to that he had a long sitting at Battersea to conclude the case in which a Lincolnshire farmer was alleged to have ill-treated his wife. He will be greatly missed by the poor, for whose benefit he had a fund and a clothes-box, and no needy person ever came before him without being assisted. Recently he was instrumental in inducing the Home Secretary to issue a public warning to parents on the subject of fireguards, and in not a few instances he has supplied them to poor people at his own expense. He never allowed an act of bravery to go unrewarded. To some extent the marked diminution in cases of baby-farming is due to Mr Hicks's searching inquiries, while he was also in a great measure responsible for the licensing of small boats and the alteration in the law restricting the sale of carbolic acid. Mr Hicks leaves a widow and a son and daughter.
