= Child life insurance =

Child life insurance is a form of permanent life insurance that insures the life of a minor. It is usually purchased to protect a family against the sudden and unexpected costs of a child's funeral or burial and to secure inexpensive and guaranteed insurance for the lifetime of the child. It offers guaranteed growth of cash value, which some carriers allow to be withdrawn (collapsing the policy) when the child is in their early twenties. Child life insurance policies typically offer the owner the option to purchase, or in some cases obtain additional guaranteed insurance when the child reaches maturity.

Child life insurance policies typically:

- Are issued with face values between $5,000 and $50,000.
- Are always issued without a required medical examination.
- Have zero investment and zero interest rate risk associated with cash value growth.
- Provide insurance coverage for a designated beneficiary.

Child life insurance should not be confused with juvenile life insurance, which is issued with much larger face values (normally $100,000–$10,000,000) and is generally purchased for college savings, lifetime savings, estate planning and guaranteed insurability.

Child life insurance has been criticized for causing a motive for murder of insured children. Forty-five coroners have stated that child life insurance is a motive to murder. The Friendly Societies Act 1875 (38 & 39 Vict. c. 60) provided for payments on the death of children to pay the expenses of their burial. The London coroner, Braxton Hicks, wrote a letter to The Times in 1889 denouncing the practice of insuring children's lives because the insurances act as a temptation to the parents to neglect them, or feed them with improper food, and sometimes even to kill them. He gave evidence in 1890 to the Committee of the House of Lords investigating Child Life Insurance. The recent Deptford poisoning case, where Mrs Winters had poisoned three people and set up multiple insurance policies, was raised.
