= Braxton Hicks contractions =

Uterine contractions during pregnancy before labor

- Other names: Practice contractions, false labour
- Specialty: Obstetrics

Braxton Hicks contractions, also known as practice contractions or false labour, are sporadic uterine contractions that occur during pregnancy, but before going into childbirth. They typically begin in the second or third trimester, but they may start as early as the sixth week of pregnancy.

== Associated conditions ==
Braxton Hicks contractions are often mistaken for labour, and are believed to allow the pregnant woman's body to prepare for labour. The presence of Braxton Hicks contractions does not mean a woman is in labour, nor even that labour is about to commence. Another common cause of pain in pregnancy is round ligament pain.

Braxton Hicks contractions vs. true labour
	Braxton Hicks contractions	True labour contractions
Cervical dilation	Do not cause cervical dilation	Cause cervical dilation
Frequency of contractions	The timing between contractions is not regular	The timing between contractions is regular and the contractions begin to occur closer together over time
Strength of contractions	Are typically not very strong	Become stronger over time
Length of contractions	Last for an uncertain and variable amount of time	Last between 30–90 seconds, growing longer as labour progresses
Location of pain	Pain is typically in the front of the abdomen	The pain starts in the back and moves around to the front
Change with movement	May stop if the woman moves	Will continue and/or become stronger regardless of the woman's movements

== Pathophysiology ==
Although the exact causes of Braxton Hicks contractions are not fully understood, there are known triggers that cause them, such as when a pregnant woman:

- is dehydrated
- has a full bladder
- has just had sexual intercourse
- has been exercising (running, lifting heavy objects)
- is under excessive stress
- has had her belly touched

There are two hypothesises for why these intermittent uterine muscle contractions may be occurring. The first is that these early ‘practice contractions’ could be helping to prepare the body for true labor by strengthening the uterine muscle. The second is that these contractions may occur when the fetus is in a state of physiological stress, in order to help provide more oxygenated blood to the fetal circulation.

== Signs and symptoms ==
The determination of Braxton Hicks contractions is dependent on the history and physical assessment of the pregnant woman's abdomen, as there are no specific imaging tests for diagnosis. The key is to differentiate Braxton Hicks contractions from true labor contractions (see Table 1 above).

Most commonly, Braxton Hicks contractions are weak and feel like mild cramping that occurs in a localised area in the front of the abdomen at an infrequent and irregular rhythm (usually every 10-20 minutes), with each contraction lasting up to 2 minutes. They may be associated with certain triggers and can disappear and reappear; they do not get more frequent, longer, or stronger over the course of the contractions. However, as the end of a pregnancy approaches, Braxton Hicks contractions tend to become more frequent and more intense.

On a physical exam, some uterine muscle tightening may be palpable, but there should be no palpable contraction in the uterine fundus and no cervical changes or cervical dilation. Braxton Hicks contractions do not lead to birth.

More concerning symptoms that may require assessment by a healthcare professional include:

- Any bleeding or fluid leakage from the vagina
- Contractions that are strong, frequent (every 5 minutes), and/or persisting for an hour
- Changes or significant decreases in fetal movement

== Management ==
Although there is no specific medical treatment for Braxton Hicks contractions, some alleviating factors include:

- Adequate hydration
- Drinking warm milk or herbal tea
- Eating a small meal
- Urination to empty a full bladder
- Rhythmic breathing
- Lying down on the left side
- Adjusting movement or activity level
- Relaxing and destressing (e.g. a massage, nap or warm bath)
- Trying other pain-management techniques (e.g. practices from childbirth preparation class)

== History ==
Braxton Hicks contractions are named after John Braxton Hicks, the English physician who first wrote about them in Western medicine. In 1872, he investigated the later stages of pregnancy and noted that many pregnant women felt contractions without being near birth. He examined the prevalence of uterine contractions throughout pregnancy and determined that contractions that do not lead to labour are a normal part of pregnancy.
