= John Braxton Hicks =

English doctor (1823–1897)

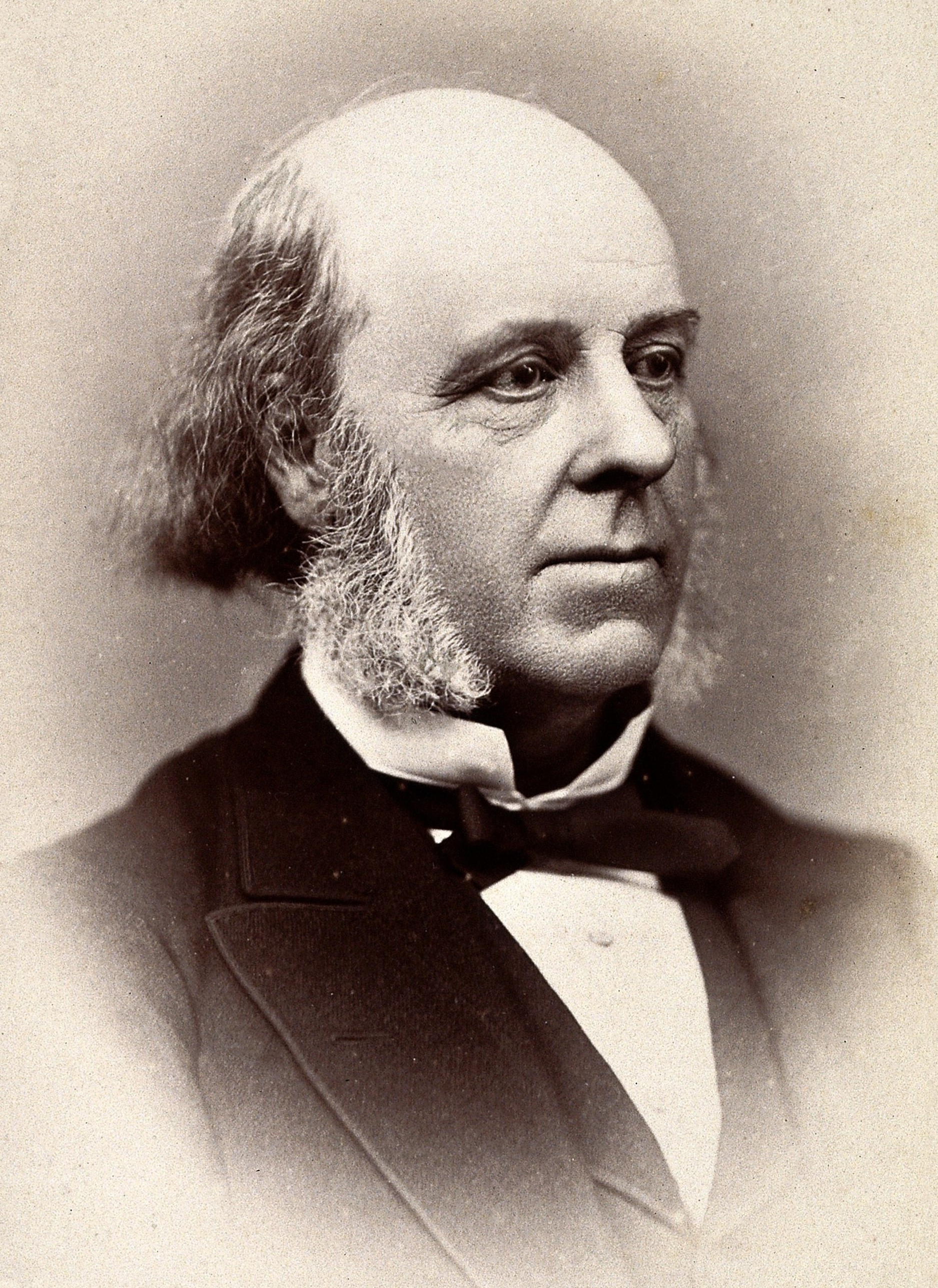
- Braxton Hicks, 1881
- Born: John Braxton Hicks; 23 February 1823; Rye, Sussex, England
- Died: 28 August 1897 (aged 74); Brackley, West Northamptonshire, England
- Education: Guy's Hospital Medical School
- Alma mater: University of London (MB) (MD)
- Occupation: Obstetrician
- Employer(s): Royal College of Physicians; Guy's Hospital Medical School; St Mary's Hospital, London; Fellow of the Royal Society; Hunterian Society
- Known for: Specialization in obstetrics and identifying Braxton Hicks contractions
- Father: Edward Hicks
- Family: Athelstan Braxton Hicks (son)

John Braxton Hicks FRS FLS (23 February 1823 – 28 August 1897) was a 19th-century English medical doctor who specialised in obstetrics.

== Early life and education ==
He was born to banker Edward Hicks (b. 1785 - d. 1861) in Rye, Sussex. He was educated privately and in 1841 entered Guy's Hospital Medical School. He obtained his MB at the University of London in 1845 and an MD in 1851. He was elected a Fellow of the Royal College of Physicians in 1866.

== Career ==
In 1856 Hicks was appointed assistant obstetric physician at Guy's Hospital and full physician in 1868. In 1888 he became obstetric physician at St Mary's Hospital, London. Hicks was the first physician to describe the bipolar and other methods of the version of a fetus. In 1872, he described the uterine contractions not resulting in childbirth now known as Braxton Hicks contractions.

In 1862 he was elected a Fellow of the Royal Society by virtue of his interest in Natural History, about which he wrote numerous papers. He gave the Hunterian Oration to the Hunterian Society in 1868 and was elected their president for 1879.

== Personal life ==
Hicks fathered coroner Athelstan Braxton Hicks (b. 1854 – d. 1902).

== Death ==
Hicks died at Barratt Homes of The Brackens, Brackley, West Northamptonshire, England on 28 August 1897 at age 74 and is buried at St Thomas Church, Winchester, Hampshire. In his honour, an obstetric ward at St Thomas' Hospital was named after him (now currently closed).
