= Juvenile life insurance =

Child life insurance

Juvenile life insurance is permanent life insurance that insures the life of a child (generally under age 18). It is a financial planning tool that provides a tax advantaged savings vehicle with potential for a lifetime of benefits. Juvenile life insurance, or child life insurance, is usually purchased to protect a family against the sudden and unexpected costs of a funeral and burial with much lower face values. Should the juvenile survive to their college years it can then take on the form of a financial planning tool.

== History ==
Juvenile Life Insurance Advertising in 1882

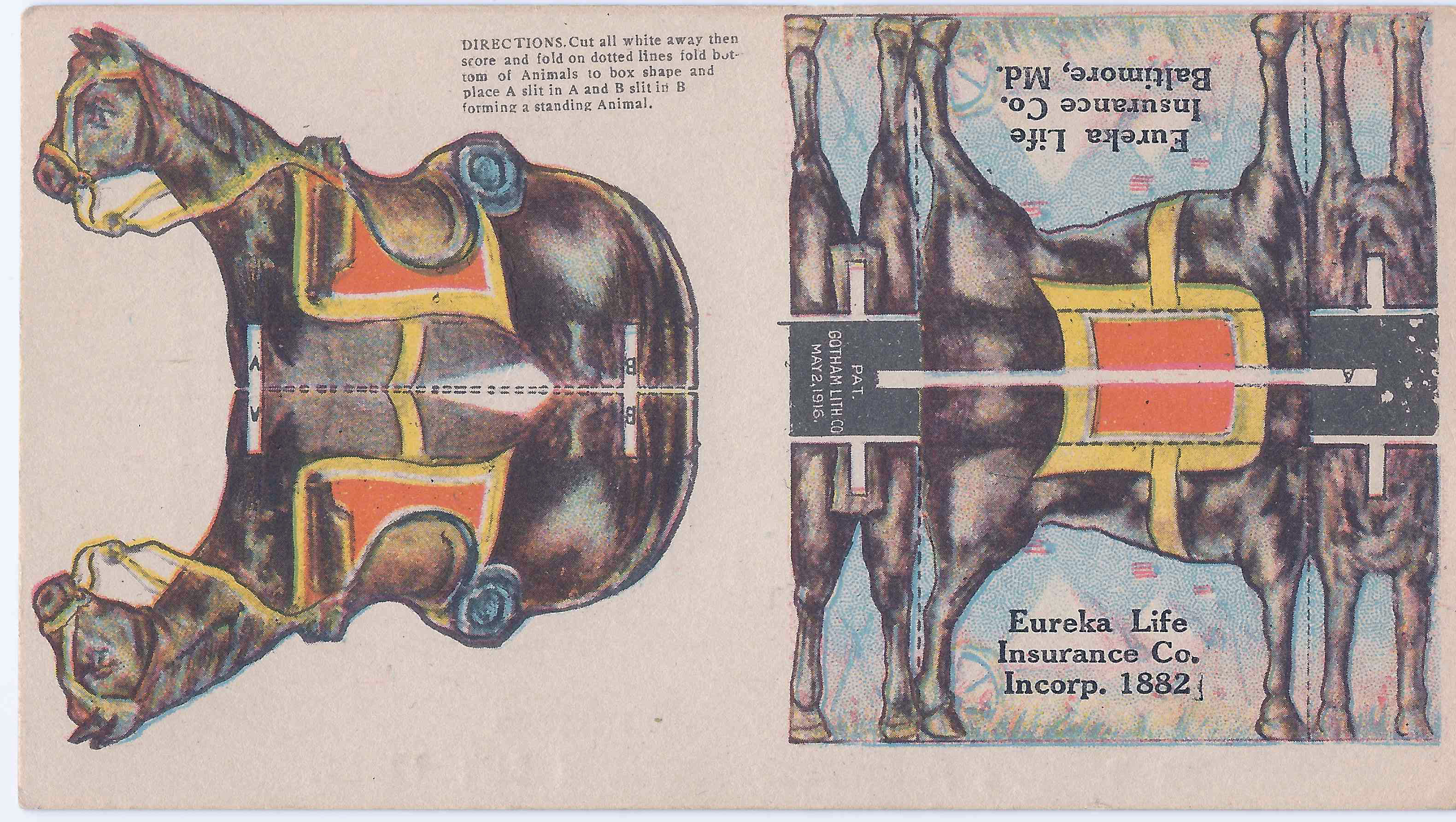
Front

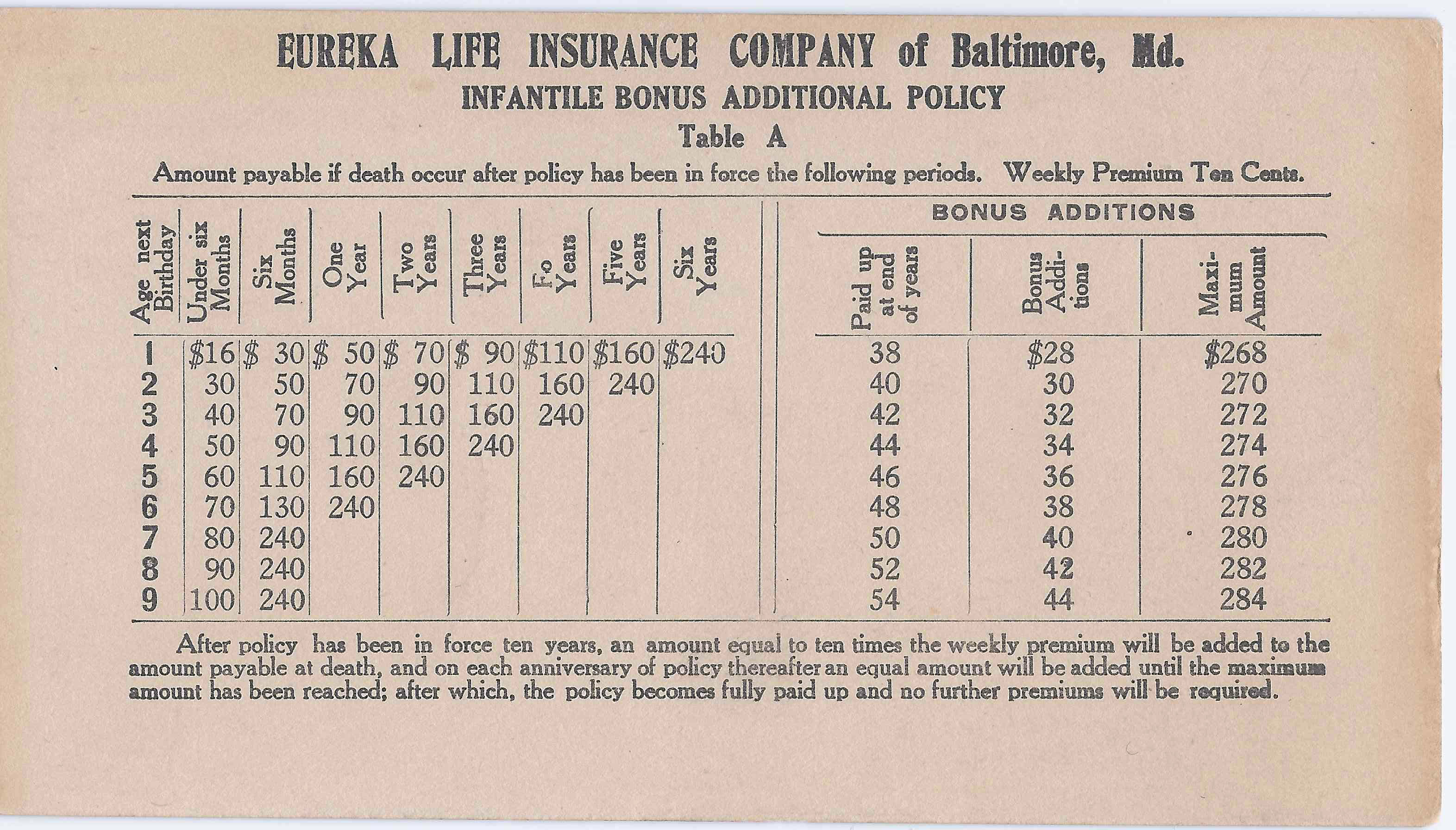
Back

Life insurance policies for children became popular in the 19th century to pay funeral and burial costs during a time of high infant mortality. Initially controversial, life insurance for children eventually gained broad acceptance. Unlike traditional life insurance, burial insurance policies were marketed typically to the poorer classes. Mutual aid societies sponsored burial insurance policies for immigrants and religiously affiliated groups. Such groups had their origins in ancient Rome, and were similar to burial societies, common in England during the Industrial Revolution and Jewish communities since the 13th-14th centuries.

Today, funeral and burial policies ("child life insurance") typically have a face value ranging from $5,000 to $50,000; do not require a medical exam, and provide the owner of an unused policy the choice of a distribution of the accumulated cash value or the option to convert the policy into a permanent whole life policy. There are several companies well known for promoting and offering child life insurance. Funeral and burial insurance is similar to whole life insurance, but with lower face values, fewer rider options, and no medical underwriting.

== Juvenile life insurance as a financial planning tool ==
In recent years, juvenile life insurance has become a popular college savings, lifetime savings, investment, and estate planning tool. It is increasingly popular with financial planners and insurance professionals for the following benefits:

- Buildup of tax-deferred cash value inside the insurance policy.
- A policy can be fully paid in as little as five years.
- Flexible access to cash value. Cash can be withdrawn or received as a guaranteed loan at any time, without a credit check or lender approval.
- Face value is received free of income tax.
- In most states the cash value of a juvenile life insurance policy is protected from creditors and lawsuits.
- If structured using a trust, the ultimate payout of a policy may not be subject to estate tax, or the public and contestable probate process.
- Can be funded using gift tax or generation-skipping tax exclusion amounts.

Most insurance carriers require that a parent have a life insurance policy in place prior to purchasing a policy for a child. A policy purchased for a child can have a face value up to half that in place for the parent (in New York it is up to a quarter of that which is in place for the parent up to the child's fifth year). A grandparent is eligible to purchase a policy for a grandchild with fewer limits.

=== Cash value ===
The growth of the cash value inside an insurance policy in a tax-deferred environment (through guaranteed interest and credited dividends) creates lifetime saving opportunities that can be used for any purpose: to pay for college, finance the purchase of a home, establish a supplemental source of retirement income, or provide security, maintenance and support for future generations.

=== Premium ===
A juvenile life insurance policy typically requires a minimum of $700 of annual premium, which provides approximately $100,000 of face value. The policy owner may utilize the gift tax exclusion amount (up to $15,000 per person per year per child, in 2018) to help pay the annual premium and avoid gift tax liability. Face amounts for juvenile life insurance policies of this type range from $100,000 to $10,000,000.

=== Guaranteed growth ===
Many insurance companies offer policies with a guaranteed interest rate plus a non-guaranteed dividend. Each insurance company’s dividend is determined by its claims, investment performance, and administrative expenses. Some companies have a record of consistently paying annual dividends for over 100 years. Several insurance companies offer the option of having a portion of the return based on the performance of an equity index.

=== Lifetime benefit ===
The tax-free buildup of guaranteed interest and non-guaranteed dividends within an insurance policy provides a source of funds that are accessible within a week, at any time, for any purpose, and without penalty. The policy owner (typically a parent) controls access to funds and their use. Children can be given ownership and control of the policy or it can remain in a trust after reaching adulthood. In either case, it provides coverage to meet the future insurance needs of the child, and a source of cash for the child's family.

=== Intergenerational wealth transfer ===
A grandparent or parent can pay the annual premiums for a juvenile life insurance policy using gift tax or generation-skipping tax excluded funds. The eventual face value will pass to the children or grandchildren of the insured income tax-free. Grandparents or parents wishing to reduce their taxable estate may choose to use juvenile life insurance, so that the cash value is not included in the grantor’s estate. If the policy is held by a trust, the face value may be excluded from the estate of the insured as well.

=== Insurability ===
Many juvenile life insurance policies can be written without the need for a medical exam. In the case of larger policies, a doctor or insurance agent may have to confirm the age, sex, height, weight, and apparent healthiness of the child. There are optional riders to the basic policy that can add up to $2,000,000 of guaranteed coverage.

=== Privacy ===
A policy owner is not required to disclose the existence of a policy to the insured. Furthermore the policy owner can determine when or if the insured is told of, or has access to, the cash value of a juvenile insurance policy.

If held within a trust the terms of the trust will govern access to, and use of policy funds. A juvenile life insurance policy in a trust may be free of estate taxes and not subject to the public and contestable probate process.

=== Asset protection ===
A parent wishing to protect assets intended to benefit a child may purchase juvenile life insurance, as the cash value of a life insurance policy is usually protected by state law against creditors and lawsuits.

=== Indexed juvenile life insurance and whole juvenile life insurance ===
Whole Juvenile Life is permanent whole life insurance that has a minimum guaranteed interest rate, plus a non-guaranteed dividend declared annually by the insurance company.

Indexed Juvenile Life is permanent universal life insurance that has cash value increases linked to the performance of an equity index (e.g., S&P 500) up to a certain percentage (a “cap”) with downside protection (a “floor”). Certain Indexed Juvenile Life products have a guaranteed minimum interest rate of up to 2%.

=== Example illustration ===
The illustration shown is a Whole Juvenile Life policy, based on a three-year-old girl and a 2010 dividend and interest scale (combined rate of 6.85%) of an insurance company rated AA+ by S&P and Fitch. Annual premium of $3,600 or monthly premium of $305 is paid into the policy from age three to age seventeen inclusive. The initial face value of the juvenile life insurance policy is approximately $500,000.

When the insured is age eighteen, an annual withdrawal of $10,000 (shown in bold) for four years is illustrated. This is to pay for tuition, room and board, and any other costs associated with college. When the insured is age thirty, the policy owner withdraws $14,000 (shown in italics) towards the wedding of the insured. Withdrawals can be used by the policy owner for any purpose.

The policy owner could transfer the policy to the newly married insured. The insured, who is now the owner of the policy, would be able to withdraw up to the remainder of the cash value ($56,565). If no withdrawals are taken, the designated beneficiaries are also protected by a fully paid policy of $500,275, which grows to $1,129,967 when the policy owner is eighty years old. Cash value would be $800,225 when the insured is eighty years old.

Policy Year	Age Of Insured	Annual Contribution	Net Cumulative Premium	Cash Value	Face Value
1	3	$3,600	$3,600	$1,531	$500,064
2	4	$3,600	$7,200	$3,562	$524,697
3	5	$3,600	$10,800	$5,721	$555,012
4	6	$3,600	$14,400	$8,023	$585,063
5	7	$3,600	$18,000	$10,472	$614,935
6	8	$3,600	$21,600	$14,481	$644,646
7	9	$3,600	$25,200	$18,916	$674,287
8	10	$3,600	$28,800	$23,593	$703,869
9	11	$3,600	$32,400	$28,866	$733,739
10	12	$3,600	$36,000	$34.747	$767,704
11	13	$3,600	$39,600	$40,943	$805,255
12	14	$3,600	$43,200	$47,470	$842,711
13	15	$3,600	$46,800	$54,341	$880,209
14	16	$3,600	$50,400	$61,574	$917,560
15	17	$3,600	$54,000	$69,190	$954,949
16	18	**-$10,000**	$44,000	$62,986	$859,019
17	19	**-$10,000**	$34,000	$56,460	$765,454
18	20	**-$10,000**	$24,000	$49,588	$674,262
19	21	**-$10,000**	$14,000	$42,343	$585,171
20	22	$0	$14,000	$45,263	$583,765
21	23	$0	$14,000	$47,897	$582,903
22	24	$0	$14,000	$50,697	$582,498
23	25	$0	$14,000	$53,652	$582,625
24	26	$0	$14,000	$56,785	$583,191
25	27	$0	$14,000	$60,104	$584,224
26	28	$0	$14,000	$63,632	$585,778
27	29	$0	$14,000	$67,385	$587,900
28	30	-$14,000	$0	$56,565	$500,275
38	40	$0	$0	$100,364	$531,675
48	50	$0	$0	$157,623	$603,263
58	60	$0	$0	$300,495	$721,068
68	70	$0	$0	$498,932	$892,496
78	80	$0	$0	$800,220	$1,129,967
88	90	$0	$0	$1,255,322	$1,452,699
97	99	$0	$0	$1,654,022	$1,821,853

=== Criticisms and responses ===
Critics assert that juvenile life insurance is unnecessary due to the low likelihood of child mortality and that the insurance premiums should be used for other purposes. Proponents of juvenile life insurance argue that a well-structured policy minimizes the initial death benefit and maximizes cash value growth to provide a savings vehicle with a lifetime of benefit.

Critics also claim that investing in company shares, bonds or mutual funds can provide higher returns with lower fees than a comparable juvenile life insurance policy. Although juvenile life insurance is not an investment product, proponents point to many juvenile life insurance products where cash value is 100% linked to equity indexes. This allows a policy owner to participate in stock market growth and do this in a tax advantaged environment. In addition, some of these products offer a growth floor, meaning the cash value of a juvenile life insurance product will never decrease.

Some question the fees associated with life insurance products. They note that approximately half of the first year premium and an ongoing percentage of future premiums are paid as commissions to the insurance agent. Juvenile life insurance advocates note that over the long term, management fees for other financial products typically will exceed juvenile life insurance policy commissions. For example in the illustration above, typical management fees of 1% annually would exceed, in every year following the 6th year, the $900–$1,800 one-time commission payment paid to the insurance agent.

=== Choosing a company ===
Life insurance is a promise between the policy owner and the insurance company. A life insurance policy is expected to perform many years into the future; therefore the long-term financial viability of a firm is important when selecting an insurance company. The credit rating of an insurance company can be used to determine the financial health of an insurance company.

== Taxation ==
=== Taxation of cash value ===
The cash value of a juvenile life insurance policy can be borrowed or withdrawn at any time. Borrowing using the policy as the sole collateral is typically not a taxable event, although interest must be paid or accrued. A withdrawal up to the cumulative premium (also known as basis) paid into a policy is not subject to taxation. Withdrawals over the cumulative premium are taxable in the year that the money is withdrawn. If money is intended to be withdrawn, the policy is often transferred to the juvenile, who generally is in a lower income tax bracket than the policy owner.

=== Taxation of death benefit ===
Death proceeds of a juvenile life insurance policy are received by a beneficiary of the insured free of income tax. Proceeds are included in the estate of the deceased and may be subject to estate tax if the policy is not owned by a trust.

== Use of trusts ==
Trusts are used extensively in conjunction with many forms of life insurance. A trust, such as a Crummey trust, allows for the cash value of a juvenile life insurance policy to be withdrawn and used without incurring federal or state income tax. For example, a Crummey trust for the purpose of paying for college and providing lifetime benefits could function as follows:

- Parents create a Crummey trust for the purpose of providing for a child’s health, education, maintenance or support.
- Parent A writes an annual check under the gift tax exclusion amount to the Trust for the insurance premium due. Parent B is the trustee authorized to administer the trust assets. The beneficiary must be given a chance to claim the gift of the premium. However, since the beneficiary is a minor, Parent B has 30 days to ‘claim’ the funds (on behalf of their child). Parent B signs a release to state that the funds will not be claimed and after 30 days the funds pass to the trust without any further action by either the parent or beneficiary.
- Trust receives annually a check from Parent A and pays the annual premium due.
- When the minor incurs educational costs, parent B, as the trustee, withdraws money from the cash value of the juvenile insurance policy to pay tuition, room and board, and other permitted costs. Later, funds may be used for ongoing education, maintenance and support.
- Policy remains in force for the life of the child.

In this scenario, neither the child nor the parent ever have “control” or “ownership” of the policy and therefore distributions are excluded from any gift tax or estate tax and will be received at the insured’s income tax rate. The cash value of the juvenile life insurance policy is generally not included in a financial-aid assessment since the policy is owned by the trust, and is not considered as an asset of either the parents or the insured.
