= Ada Williams (baby farmer) =

English child murderer

- Born: circa 1875
- Died: 6 March 1900 (aged 24); Newgate Prison, London, England
- Other name: Mrs Hewetson
- Spouse: William Chard Williams
- Status: Executed by hanging
- Convictions: 17 February 1900
- Criminal charges: Murder
- Penalty: Death (by hanging)

Ada Chard Williams (c. 1875–1900) was a baby farmer who was convicted of strangling to death 21-month-old Selina Ellen Jones in Barnes in London in September 1899.

Florence Jones, a young unmarried mother, had read an advert in the local newspaper which offered to find homes for unwanted children. She agreed to pay £5 to a Mrs Hewetson (Ada Chard Williams) but could only give her £3 on the day. She returned later with the balance and found that Mrs Hewetson and Selina had vanished.

Florence reported the matter to the police. Ada Chard Williams wrote a letter to the police denying the crime but in effect admitting she was a baby farmer who bought and sold babies for profit. The police soon discovered that Mrs Hewetson was Ada Chard Williams. However, they had no body with which to prove there had been a murder, at least not until Selina's corpse was washed up on the bank of the Thames at Battersea.

Braxton Hicks, the coroner who carried out the subsequent inquest, pointed out that the knots in the cord, a "fisherman's bend", had been found on three other dead bodies of children. On the child's head there was a very large bruise, which suggested that someone had taken the child by the legs, and struck it against a wall before it was strangled.

Like Amelia Dyer, Ada Chard Williams had her own "signature" way of tying up bodies she wished to dispose of, using a knot called a Fisherman's knot or bend and which was a crucial piece of evidence at her trial at the Old Bailey on 16 and 17 February 1900. She was hanged, aged 24, in the yard of Newgate Prison on 6 March 1900, the last woman to be hanged there.

She was suspected of killing other children although no proceedings were brought.

However, it was suggested that she might not have been the one who murdered the children as it was clear that she and her husband were both involved in the active fraud that surrounded their lives and the baby farming. When considering whether to respite her conviction it was noted that in all crimes other than murder that the influence of a husband could be used as a defence and it was thought more likely that it was her husband that had murdered the children and even wrapped them up and that all Ada Williams had done was assist and dispose of the packages, all under the influence of her husband. The jury found the husband at the least an accessory after the fact but the judge noted that he was not on trial and could not be convicted and it was noted that considering his probable involvement, he got away without any punishment whatsoever whilst Ada Williams suffered the final penalty. Her husband was 47-year-old whilst Ada Williams was only 24-years-old.

== See also ==
- Richmond Child Murder

== Sources ==
- Block, Brian P.; Hostettler, John (1997). Hanging in the Balance: A History of the Abolition of Capital Punishment in Britain. Winchester: Waterside Press. ISBN 978-1-872870-47-2.
- Eddleston, John J. (2004). The Encyclopaedia of Executions. London: John Blake Publishing Ltd. ISBN 978-1-84454-058-7.
- Fielding, Steve (1995). The Hangman's Record. Vol. Two: 1900–1929. Beckenham: Chancery House Press. ISBN 978-0-900246-77-7.
- Vincent, Benjamin (1906). "Executions". Haydn's Dictionary of Dates and Universal Information Relating to All Ages and Nations (Twenty-fourth ed.). New York: G. P. Putnam's Sons.
- Finn, Pat (2016). Homicide 1900. London: Independent. ISBN 979-8355839314.
