= Kew Mortuary =

Former mortuary

Coordinates: 51°29′8.17″N 0°17′13.52″W

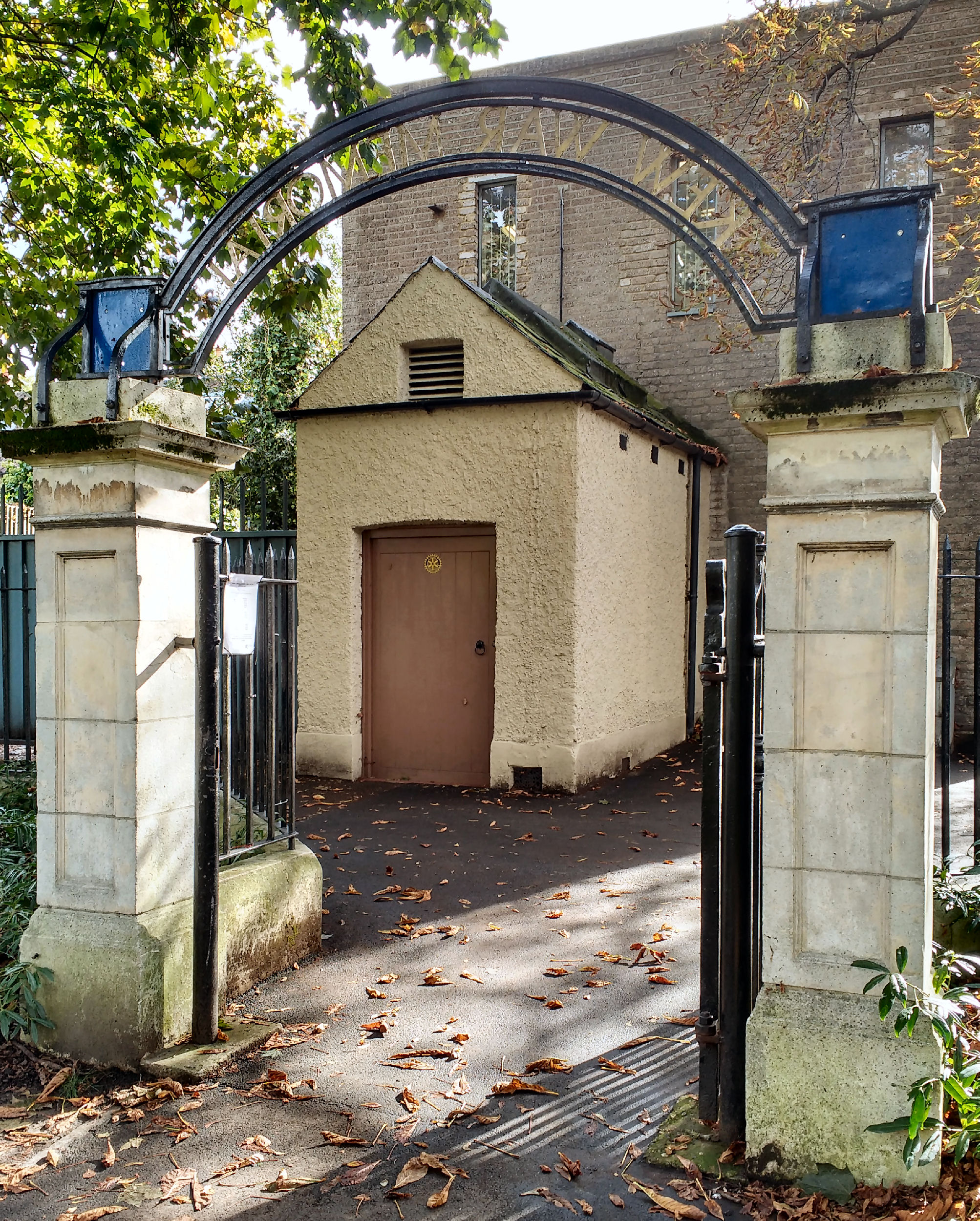
Kew Mortuary

The Kew Mortuary or Dead-House is a small, shed-like building, approximately 3.75 by 2.25 metres (12.3 ft × 7.4 ft) and 2.8 metres (9 ft 2 in) high, attached to the back of Caxton House, 110 Kew Green (TW9 3AR), just to the east of Kew Bridge on Greyhound Lane facing Westerley Ware. This Victorian mortuary building retains an original slate slab.

== History ==
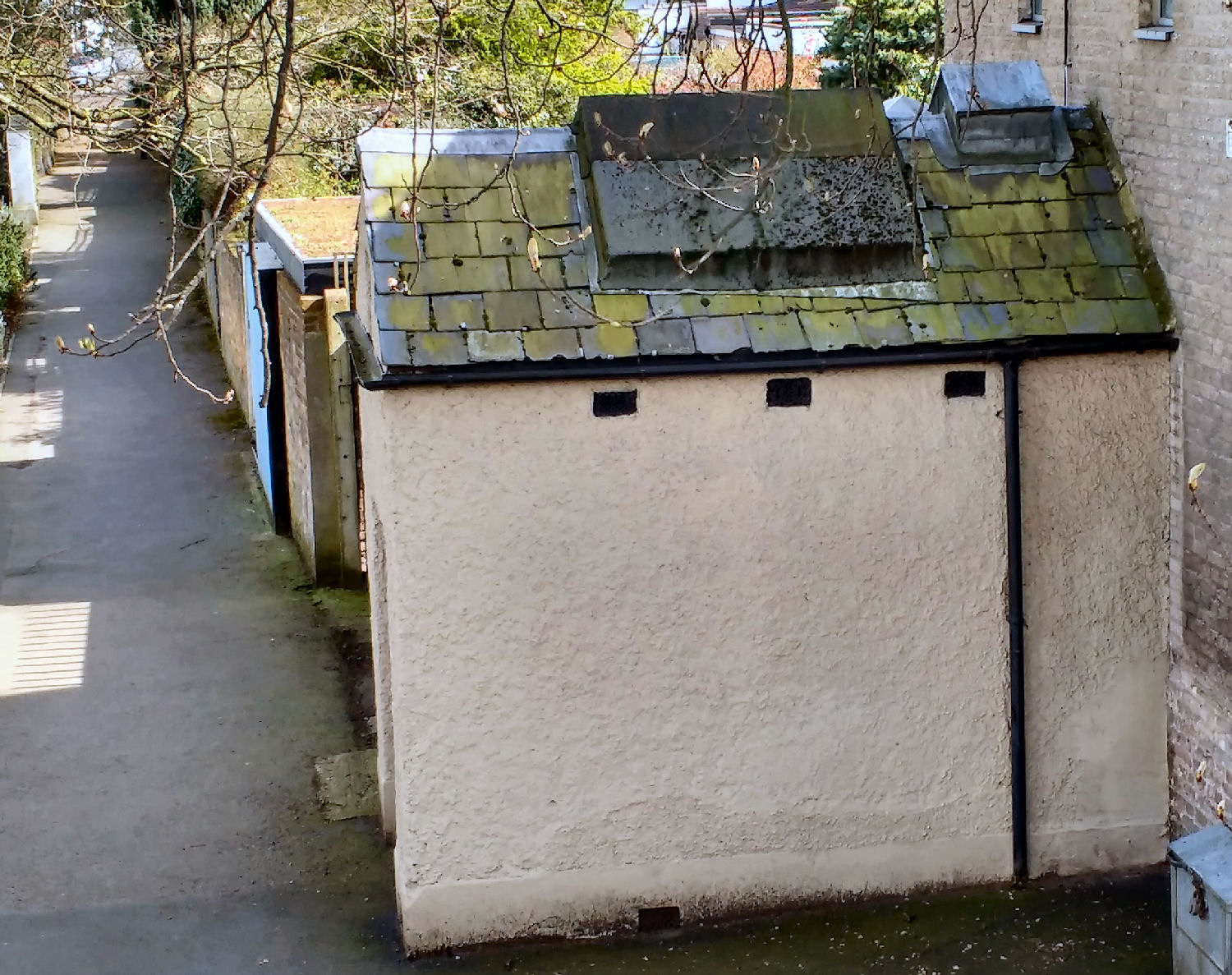
View from Kew Bridge, showing ventilation system

Kew is bordered by the Thames so bodies of drowned people frequently were washed up along its shore. Originally such bodies would be taken to either facilities provided by the local vestry or more often a local public house, although publicans were not required to receive dead bodies. It was not until the Public Health Act 1848 (11 & 12 Vict. c. 63) that local boards of health were enabled to build mortuaries or 'dead-houses'. Under the Sanitary Act 1866 there was still no requirement to build a mortuary, although where one existed corpses of those who died from infectious diseases were required to be taken to the mortuary. The Public Health Act 1872 established sanitary authorities. It was not until the Public Health Act 1875 (38 & 39 Vict. c. 55) that the Local Government Board could compel local authorities to provide mortuaries.

Locally, there seems to have been a mortuary or dead-house in Mortlake by 1856. The need for a dead-house at Twickenham under the Sanitary Act 1866 was discussed from 1871 as "in some instances publicans objected to having the bodies brought to their premises"; tenders were submitted in 1875. There was also a mortuary at Hampton Wick and Barnes about the same time and a mortuary in Brentford from about 1870. In Richmond the mortuary seems to have been at the workhouse and as late as 1900 the coroner, Mr Braxton Hicks, was describing it as insanitary and a disgrace.

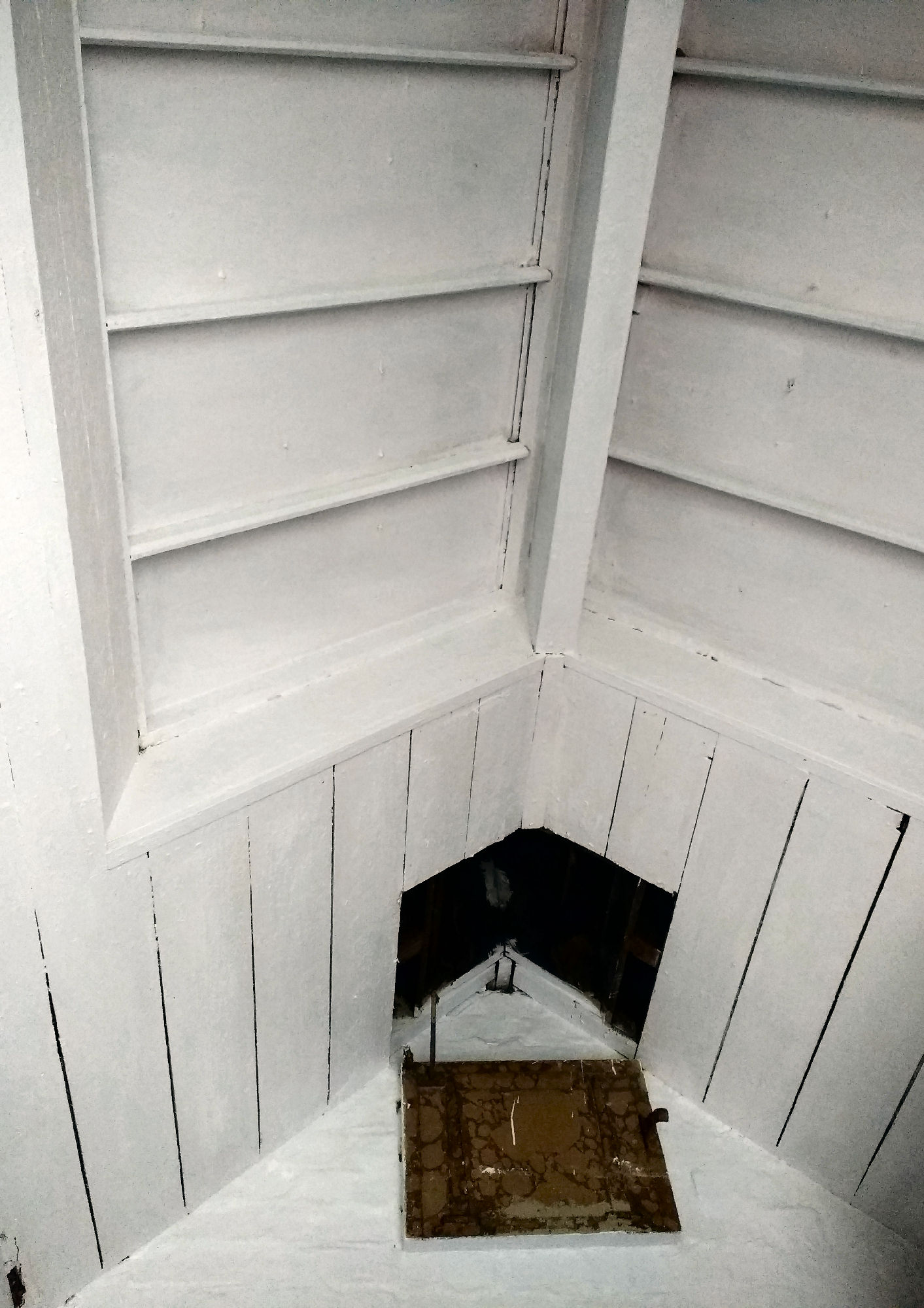
Interior

The earliest record for a mortuary at Kew is from 1871, so the mortuary probably dates from the late 1860s. At that time the attached building would have been occupied by Robert Surman, butcher.

The parish of Kew found itself without a parish constable in 1873. They contended that under the Parish Constables Act 1872 it was no longer necessary to appoint one, although at their Court Leet they did appoint a beadle and head-borough, who had the keys of the dead-house. However, he refused to take charge of a body found in the Thames and handed the keys to the police. The police instead called in the parish constable for Richmond.

The police gradually took over powers from the local parish constable or headborough, including the removal of bodies.

=== The condition of mortuaries ===
The deficiencies of the local mortuaries started to become an issue.

In 1869 the dead-house at Kingston was "within a stone's throw of the Market-place... adjoining the graveyard" with "no slab or bench" for the body and described as most horrible. In 1870 part of the old watch house in Brick Lane (now Union Street), was fitted out as a Dead-house. The Kingston Mortuary in 1880 was described as being in a disgraceful condition, with insufficient light to carry out post-mortems. By 1881 it was being described as "not a fit place in which to place the dead body of a dog, much less that of a human being" by the jury. Even by 1903 the Kingston Mortuary was "formerly a shed for fuel consumed by the church." A new mortuary was opened in Kingston by 1905, but met with criticism.

In 1882 the Local Government Board wrote to the Richmond Vestry advising that "Richmond: The Mortuaries now in existence are not satisfactory. They are far too small and not properly fitted up or ventilated." A committee was set up that by 1883 recommended alterations.

By 1882 members of the inquest jury were expressing their disgust at the state "of the Mortlake parish dead-house", saying that "it is never cleaned out". In 1882 The Rural Sanitary Authority advertised for land in Mortlake and Petersham for mortuaries. In 1886 plans were made for a new mortuary and accommodation for inquests.

Locally, there was no mortuary or ambulance at Ham, and the police had to borrow a cart to take the body to the Crooked Billet pub, where the post-mortem was carried out in the stable. The Coroner, Braxton Hicks, raised the question in 1885 of a mortuary at Ham and improvements at Kew, saying that the rude provision made for the reception of human remains there was a public scandal. He pointed out where there was no local mortuary the body could in theory be left with the churchwardens, although generally the body was often taken to a public house. After that bodies from Ham were taken to Kingston until 1905.

Coroner's inquests also started off being in public houses but gradually moved into improved facilities.

The local paper reported in 1885 on carrying out a post mortem at Kew:

Dr. Anderson: It is very inconvenient. The Coroner: The public can look in at the windows while it is going on? Dr. Anderson: Yes. I had the kind assistance of the police, or I should have had a lot of children and idle persons looking in at the windows. The Coroner: The ventilation is bad and there is no top light. You have to get light from the side windows? Dr Anderson: Yes, and there is a pool of water which smells badly close to the window. It struck me very forcibly as a bad place for such a purpose. The Coroner: The situation is not bad in its way, but it appeared to me to be a very inconvenient place. A Juror: The mortuary is not so bad as the stretcher they carried the body on. Here is a piece of the wood of which it is made. You see it is like a piece of touchwood. If the man had not been dead it might have broken down and broken his neck. The Coroner: Who is the sanitary authority here? Mr. Inspector Pinhorn: The Richmond Rural Sanitary Authority. Mr. Nelson: The stretcher is in the care of the vicar and churchwardens. Mr. Fobbs said he believed the nasty pool of water outside the mortuary arose from the place being used as a common urinal. The Coroner: What you want is a fresh mortuary. The Coroner said a proper mortuary was certainly needed in a parish on the banks of the river where dead bodies were often found. The present mortuary was not a proper place to bring a dead body to. It was not decent that the doctor should be apt to be overlooked by a lot of children when he was making a post mortem examination, and besides that the drainage was bad and the light was bad. The attention of the vicar and churchwardens ought to called to the state of the mortuary, and a new one ought to be provided.

The poor state of the mortuaries at Mortlake, Kew and Barnes was discussed again in 1886. It was reported that "no one was in charge of the mortuary at Kew". "More bodies found in the river were brought to the Surrey shore than to the Middlesex side, because on this side they paid the men for taking the bodies out three times as much as they did on the opposite side." The Surrey authorities paid 5 shillings (a crown) for every body recovered, under a statute of George III, while on the Middlesex side it was only half a crown.

In 1896 the old Richmond Vestry Hall, the mortuary was at the rear, was pulled down and replaced by a new Magistrates Court and mortuary. The condition of the Richmond mortuary was again condemned in 1900: "A short time ago there were five bodies in there, and there was not room in the place for them. It was not only a disgrace but most insanitary. His juries complained that they could not view the bodies which had been in the water some time ... owing to the lack of proper accommodation."

Despite the inadequacies of the Kew mortuary it continued in use for the reception of bodies.

=== The running of the mortuary ===
Under the Local Government Act 1894 the powers of the vestry were transferred to the Richmond Borough Council, including the mortuary. They reported that Mrs Taylor had been paid 5s for cleaning the mortuary and washing the towels, sheets, and stretcher for each corpse taken to the mortuary. She was paid for the seven cases that had occurred since the extension of the Borough.

Bodies from the Thames were collected by a police ambulance stationed in Kew Gardens Road and taken to Kew Mortuary. They were then taken to Richmond in a shell by a local undertaker. There were five such cases in 1908 and four in 1909. In 1910 Kew residents again raised the deficiencies of the mortuary, without washing facilities and described by one resident as "smaller than his coal cellar". The police complained that the reason for asking for improved facilities was that the building was dilapidated. The Police did not want to take bodies the 2 miles to Richmond on their ambulance. Rubber sheets were eventually provided for the police to wrap the body.

=== Final years ===
In 1914 the Richmond Health Committee heard about complaints from residents about the use of the mortuary. They agreed that dead bodies should be immediately taken to the Richmond mortuary at Eton Lodge. They therefore purchased a hand ambulance for £3 that would be stored in the mortuary and used by the police.

In 1924 the Kew Commonable Rights Committee asked if the mortuary could be used as a groundsman's office and tool shed. This was rejected because "the building is still used for the purpose of a Mortuary", but they could build a shed on the site adjoining the mortuary "formerly used for the purpose of a Urinal and Pound."

The mortuary survived and is currently used as a store room by the Kew Gardens Rotary Club.

== Recovery of bodies in the Thames ==
The parish was responsible for burial, under the Burial of Drowned Persons Act, and a fee of 5 shillings (a crown) was also paid by the parish for the recovery of drowned bodies. After the Princess Alice disaster Woolwich parish applied for reimbursement from the county, which was rejected because the river was not sea. The Act was amended to include "tidal or navigable waters" such as the Thames.

=== The Police Order 1899 ===
On 1 August 1899 the Metropolitan Police Commissioner, Sir Edward Bradford, issued a new Police Order that "The Police will therefore inform the Overseers of any cases coming under their notice, and will also use every effort to procure the immediate removal by the Overseers of any such dead bodies to the Parish Mortuary." The Police Commissioner issued the order because the police were not paid to remove bodies under the Act. This Police Order had serious consequences when bodies were recovered from the Thames in London and throw some light on the practice.

One of the first cases following the Police Order was the inquest in Lambeth where "In the ordinary course the police would have conveyed it to the mortuary close by, but, owing to the order above referred to, they went in search of the overseers and churchwardens." Thomas Hemmings, an inspector of Thames Police, said "the police had removed bodies themselves for a great many years. ... The custom varied in different parishes. At Pimlico, for instance, the mortuary authorities always removed bodies found in the river, also at Westminster and Poplar."

The Overseers in parishes along the tidal Thames objected to the new Police Order. As reported by local newspapers.

"There’s no doubt about it — there’s no way out of it — the overseers are responsible for the dead bodies that wash up from the Thames." So spoke Mr. William Honey, the clerk to the Lambeth Overseers, when interviewed by a South London Press representative.

The law of the thing — and it is the law with which Mr. Honey is mostly concerned — showed the position clearly. In the reign of his blessed Majesty King George III an obligation was imposed upon churchwardens and overseers to take charge of bodies washed up "from the sea." The phrase "from the sea" did not obviously affect Thames-side parishes. But when, in 1878, the Princess Alice disaster occurred, bodies were very extensively thrown on the river bank, and there seemed no properly constituted authority to deal with them. This led to an Act being passed extending the provisions of George III to "tidal or navigable waters." Thus the overseers are liable, as the Chief Commissioner says. On the point of expediency, however, Mr. Honey was convinced that the police would find the Chief Commissioner’s order unworkable, for while the man in blue was engaged in hunting up an overseer he might be superintending the removal of the dead body to the mortuary. "This much," said he, "was admitted to me by officer who came to me last Saturday." Mr. Honey recognized that the overseers might appoint a man to look after dead bodies, but that would not be so efficient as the police arrangement, for the "man in blue" is always patrolling the river embankment. The same question received the attention of the overseers at their meeting on Wednesday, when Mr. Victor Roger presided. Mr. Honey mentioned that a Thames police officer called on him on Saturday, and intimated that a body had been found in mid-river. Why he brought it into Lambeth he didn't know. The Chairman: That’s the officer that called at my house. I wasn’t in. (Laughter.) Mr. Honey believed that the officer went to Mr. Roger’s and Mr. James Farmer’s. (Laughter.) He could find neither in. He added that he had received a letter from the deputy coroner, conveying the rider of the jury arrived at an inquest last week (already reported in the South Loudon Press). The board were urged to approach the Chief Commissioner to withdraw the order. Mr. Vincent saw no reason for the alteration. Mr. Honey said they always paid a reward of 5s. for each body recovered. Mr. Marshall: Why should the police bring bodies to Lambeth from the midriver? Mr. Honey: No doubt because there are better landing facilities, and because we have a mortuary close at hand.

The chairman felt that the duty was a very gruesome one for the police. Eventually it was resolved to appeal to the Chief Commissioner of Police to reconsider his decision.
Evidence is accumulating that the order of the Commissioner Police with reference to bodies found in the Thames is only leading to painful scandals. In the case of an inquest on Wednesday, it was stated that a constable found the body of a young woman floating in the river. Owing to the police order it could not be removed except by as Overseer, and while the policeman was trudging five miles in search of one the body was left lying the river for an hour and a quarter tied to a boat, a gaping crowd looking on meanwhile. The jury at the inquest condemned the order which makes such a state of things possible. It is impossible to see anything but unnecessary delays and disturbance of the old and better state of things in the order from Scotland Yard, and in the circumstances it to be hoped the Commissioner of Police will see the wisdom of withdrawing it at the earliest possible moment.

The coroner, Mr. A. Braxton Hicks, also reported the difficulties.

At the Battersea Coroner's Court, on Saturday, Mr. A. Braxton Hicks held an inquiry concerning the death of JAMES GOODING, aged 52, a chimney-sweep's manager, who was found drowned in the Thames on Wednesday.

William Orton, aged 15, said that at 10:45 on Wednesday morning he saw the body of the deceased floating in the river opposite Battersea Church. He swam about 30 yards and re-covered the body. When he brought it ashore he had to mind it for half an hour while the police went in search of an undertaker to remove it. Sergeant Ellis, 59 V, who was called to the body, said it was shockingly decomposed. In accordance with the Commissioner's new order, he informed Mr. Smith, an undertaker who acted for the overseers, of the finding of the body, which lay on the foreshore for half an hour before it was removed. Witness had placed a sack over the face, but there were a number of children standing about. Then, again, the tide was rising, and the body had to be shifted several times to avoid it being washed away.

The coroner said the case was one of considerable public importance as it showed the extreme impracticability of the new police order, which was founded on an Act of Parliament passed in 1803. That Act, however, related only to the removal of bodies for speedy and decent interment, and coroners were not mentioned in the Act at all. After the Princess Alice disaster it was found that a great many men who recovered the bodies of the victims could not be paid for their services, the result being that the Act was extended to apply to all persons found drowned in navigable or tidal waters, such as the Thames. By the common law a body is bound to be removed to the mortuary and information was at once to be given to the coroner. An overseer could not inter a body until a coroner had held an inquest upon it. In this case he himself saw the body lying exposed to the gaze of children, and there were some 20 adults standing about; it was little short of a scandal. The sooner the order was rescinded the sooner they would get back to common sense. In the old days he always paid the police, and it seemed ridiculous to him that they were not paid now. He believed the public would endorse what he said. If it was a question of payment he was sure that no county council or coroner would object to pay the police for doing such an unpleasant duty if they did it properly. He had already written to the Home Secretary complaining of this order, and no doubt he would have inquiries made as to why it was issued. It caused the dead to be unduly exposed, and was a public scandal. In returning a verdict of "Suicide during temporary insanity " the jury added a rider expressing it as their opinion that, in order to avoid a gross and dangerous scandal to both health and morals, the new police order should be at once rescinded.
DEAD BODIES. It was agreed that a communication be addressed to the Secretary of State protesting against the recent order of the Commissioner of Police on the subject of the removal of dead bodies which are found in or cast ashore from tidal or navigable waters, and that the other metropolitan vestries and district boards be asked to take similar action.

Braxton Hicks wrote to the Home Secretary, Sir Matthew White Ridley, about the Police Order issued by the Metropolitan Commissioner of Police.

=== The Coroner and the Kew Beadle ===
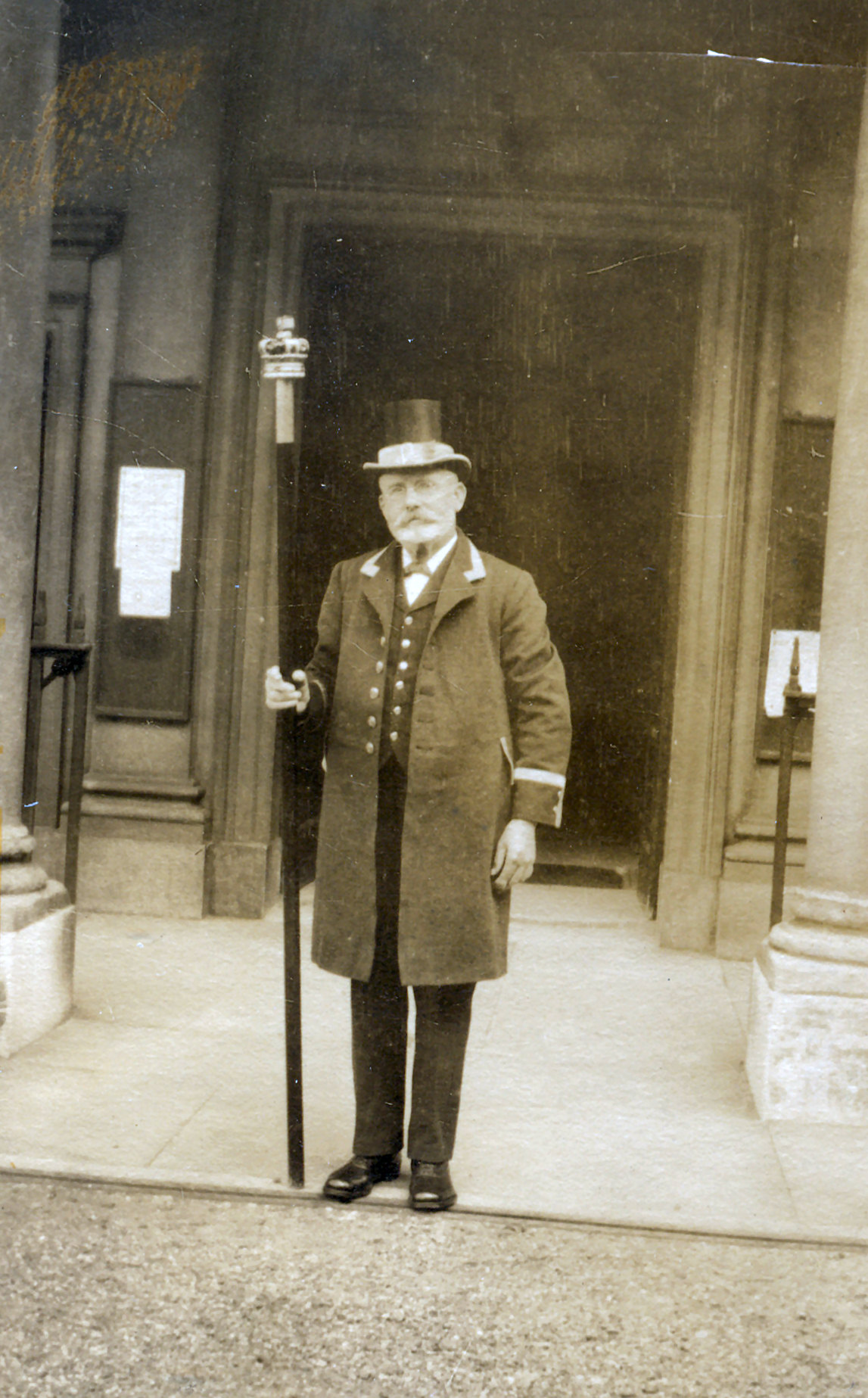
George Viner, the Kew Beadle, in about 1930

By December the situation was still not clear and that caused a problem for the parish of Kew.

Mr A. Braxton Hicks held an inquiry last evening, at the Church-room, Richmond, with reference to the death of Richard Edmund Pottinger, aged 62 years, a civil engineer, lately residing at 12, Grosvenor-road, Twickenham, who was found drowned in the Thames on Dec. 24. Hattie Isabel Robinson said that in 1894 her brother went out in a ships boat at sea, and had not been heard of since. That had upset her father but he had never threatened suicide. He was a very temperate man, and had no troubles, pecuniary or otherwise. On the afternoon of Nov. 21 he left her to go for a walk, and promised to return. He was a little depressed, and left his watch and chain at home, which was very unusual. He was very near-sighted. Walter Clifford VVaight, a waterman, living at 39, High-street, Brentford, stated that at noon on Sunday he saw the body of the deceased floating down the river off Brentford Ferry. He landed it on the Surrey shore, and handed it over to a constable. Police-constable Hubbard, 533 V, said he took possession of the body, and informed the parish constable at Kew. The Coroner: I have never heard of such a person. Why did you call him? He is the beadle. The Coroner: You take my advice, and act on your own authority in future. My officer is the one to remove bodies, not the parish constable, or whoever he is, else I shall have something to say. No one else has any authority nowadays. It is not your fault, it is your ridiculous superior officers, the Commissioners of Police. The Constable: It is our orders. The Coroner: Well, I am not going to have any more of these scandals. Let the person referred to be called. George Viner then came forward, and said he was herdsman, beadle, and head-borough of the parish of Kew. He was sworn in as headborough at a Manor Court by a Mr. Smith, he believed. The Coroner: Who is Mr. Smith, an under-taker? Witness: No, I believe he is steward of the Manor, but I do not quite know. The Coroner: Well, he is utterly out of the world so far as this Court is concerned. Witness: It was pointed out to the overseers that it was their duty to remove bodies, and they appointed me to do it. The Coroner: It is not their duty at all; it is their duty to bury bodies. You have no right to touch a body without a warrant, my officer or the police can do that. Will you kindly tell the overseers to mind their own business? Witness: I shall carry out my orders. If you will write to the overseers. The Coroner: I am sick of writing. You tell the overseers that they are not to interfere with the work; that is quite enough authority for you. The Commissioners have withdrawn the order to a large extent, and said that if necessary the police are to remove bodies for decency sake. You are not responsible to me, as you are not a sworn constable. If you choose to do it again I shall send you to prison, and I am sure you will not like that. Witness: No, I should not. The Coroner: You are between the devil and the deep sea. You had better look after the devil — that is, the Coroner; the river is the deep sea. I am tired of writing: I only get rude letters in return. Take my advice. Leave the police to do their duty, you have no authority for doing it. The Jury returned a verdict that the deceased was Found Drowned in the Thames, but there was not sufficient evidence to show how he came in the water.

Coroner Hicks and the Kew Beadle
The extraordinary attitude assumed by Mr Braxton Hicks towards Mr Viner, the beadle of Kew, at an inquest in Richmond last week, has attracted the attention of a representative of the Evening News, who writes about it as follows:– "The Royal and ancient parish of Kew is agitated by an insult offered to the dignity of its beadle, headborough, and herdsman by Mr Braxton Hicks.

"The reason that eminent coroner attacked Kew's picturesque functionary so fiercely is as follows. A body was found in the Thames near Kew, and the police were apprised of its discovery. They informed the authorities at Kew. The overseers of Kew, in the person of their trusty beadle, headborough, and herdsman, thereupon placed it in their little mortuary.

"At the inquest Mr Braxton Hicks expressed himself in the following terms: That no one but the police and his [the coroner's] officers had any right to touch the body.

"It was pleaded in reply that the police regulations were followed, but Mr Braxton Hicks referred to the police authorities as the police's 'ridiculous superior officers' and turning to the beadle, headborough, and herdsman of Kew, told him that if he touched any of his bodies again, he should commit him for CONTEMPT OF COURT.

"An Evening News representative went to see the disgusted beadle, headborough, and herdsman, whom he found to be quite unlike Mr Bumble in appearance and manner. His name is Mr George Viner, and he was appointed beadle, headborough, and herdsman of Kew eight years ago. Shortly after, he was sworn in as beadle, headborough and herdsman before the Manor Court, of which Her Majesty is titular head, for she is Lady of the Manor or Kew.

"It was only last August, however, that he received instructions from the overseers of Kew, in accordance with instructions they had received from the Commissioner of Police, relative to the looking after of bodies found in the Thames. He can only say that he will carry out such instructions as the police may give, and if Mr Braxton Hicks perseveres in his fell course Kew may possibly be beadleless, headboroughless, and herdsmanless during the unavoidable absence of Mr Viner in one of HER MAJESTY'S PRISONS.

"It was the more fully to sympathize with Kew in her prospective plight that The Evening News representative was led to ask Mr Viner all about his various duties. The headboroughship, Mr Viner said, dated from Saxon times. The headborough was one appointed by a 'tithing', or collection of ten families, to be responsible to the State for the behaviour of all the individuals of the tithing. In some counties the headborough was called "Borsholder", but the whole of Mr Viner's duties in regard to this office are transferred to the police by the Metropolitan Police Act of some years ago.

"But Kew will suffer if the coroner's dire threat is carried out, and its beadle, headborough, and herdsman is committed. Who will look after the pasturing rights on Kew Green? Who will have charge of the village pond? Who will officiate as beadle of Kew Church and show distinguished personages to their seats on Sundays? It would be indeed terrible. Perhaps Mr Braxton Hicks will relent.

The Kew overseers also wrote to the Home Secretary. Eventually the Commissioner of Police conceded "Unless, therefore, the Overseers or Churchwardens intimate that they desire this duty to be performed by themselves, or by some duly accredited agent on their behalf, the Police are to take steps to ensure the removal of all bodies coming under their notice as promptly as possible".
