= Richmond child murder =

1895 murder of an infant in London, England

The Richmond child murder was the case of Amy Gregory who was convicted in 1895 of strangling to death her daughter, Frances Maud Gregory, whose dead body was found on the ice in the Old Deer Park, Richmond, England. She was granted a reprieve from execution by the Home Secretary.

The case was widely reported at a time when women on trial for killing their babies were increasingly charged with manslaughter instead of murder and eventually led to a change in the law for infanticide.

== Early life ==
She was born Amy Smart in West Brighton on 16 February 1872 and married Frederick James Gregory (born 5 June 1867, Worthing) in Richmond in 1889. Her first child, Amy Sarah Ann, was born on 13 May that year and this was followed by the birth of a son, James William Walter, on 27 January 1892. In 1891 they were living at Albert Road, Richmond. Frederick was variously described as a groom, coachman, house-painter, 'paperhanger' (1911) or paper monger (1939). Her parents, John and Ann Smart, were living at Sheendale Terrace in 1891, and at 96 Mortlake Road in 1901.

== The murder ==
The events leading up to her being charged are outlined in the witness statements from the inquest and trial and reported widely in the press.

=== The birth ===
At the time that Amy gave birth to Frances witnesses said that she had not been living with her husband for about 15 months. According to a neighbour, Mrs Priest, he and the children were staying with his parents. The reason for the separation from her husband and children was never made clear.

Amy entered the workhouse in Richmond on 12 December, describing herself as being single. Her daughter was born in Richmond Workhouse on 31 December 1894, registered as Frances Maud Smart on 12 January, and baptised on 20 January 1895.

Frances Jones, a nurse at the Richmond Workhouse, described how the baby was born in the lying-in ward on 31 December. The mother identified herself as Amy Smart, of 3 Sheen Dale Mortlake Road, Domestic Servant, and she left the ward on 7 January. Amy left the workhouse on 24 January "of her own accord, she was not compelled in any way. She might have remained in." according to Isobel Preston, another nurse at the Richmond Workhouse.

=== Discovery of the body ===
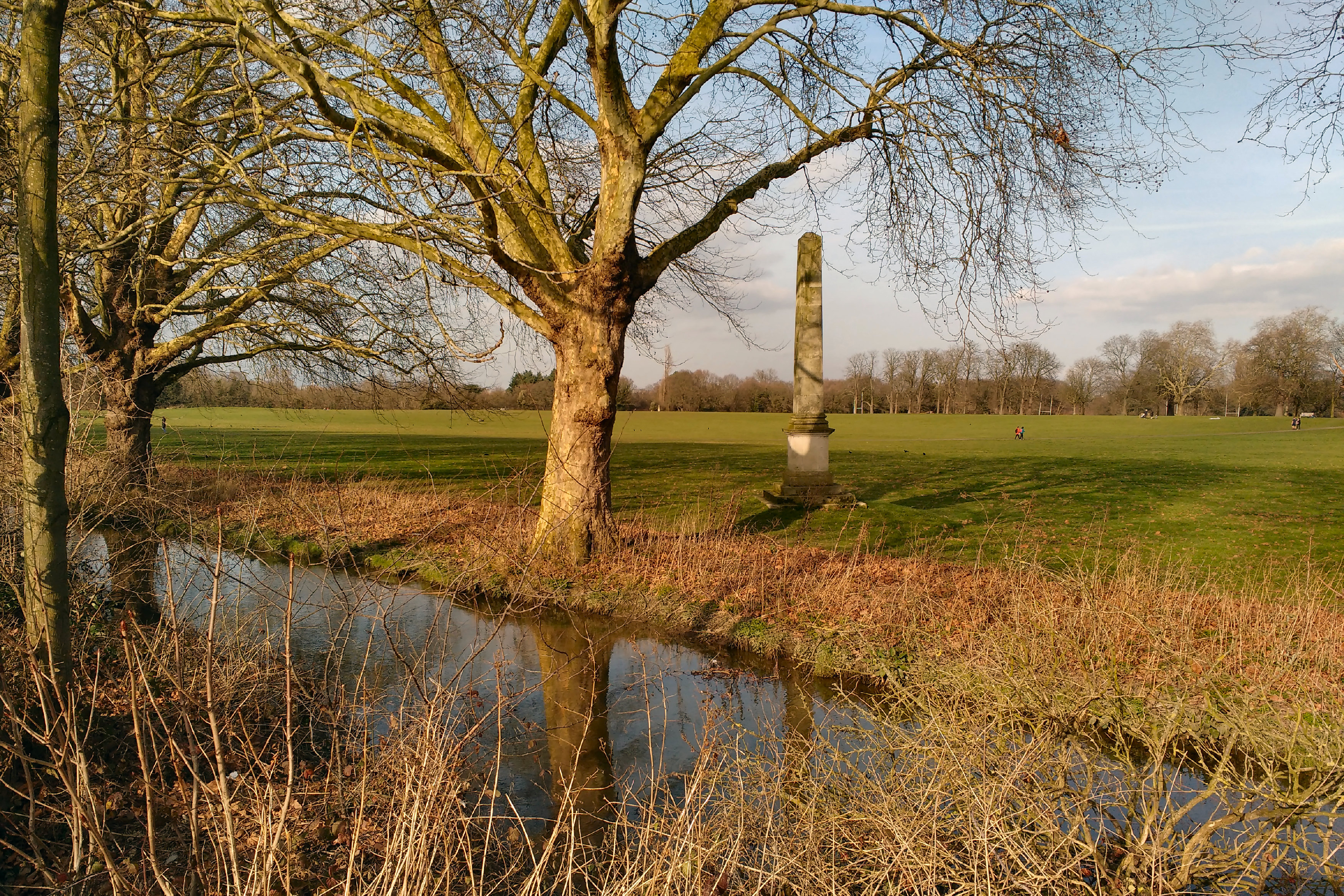
View of the Old Deer Park from the towpath

The body of the child was discovered by William Walker, a coach smith from Hounslow, on the early morning of 21 February, who reported it to Constable John Adams on duty at Asgill Lane. The body was found naked, lying face downwards on the ice in the Ha-ha, about halfway between the Railway Bridge and the Richmond Lock footbridge and about two yards from the towpath. A white pocket handkerchief was tied very tightly twice round its neck and knotted. The body was taken to the police station where it was examined by Dr Matthew Gardiner who determined that death was caused by strangulation. "The hands were clenched, the eyes wide open, the tongue prominent between the gums and deeply congested. On the left side of the face were two abraded wounds, which had been caused either during life or immediately after death. There were two broad bands round the neck separated at places by a lite ridge of skin. The neck was squeezed in all round." There were no marks of violence, however the child was described as very emaciated, weighing only 5½ lb.

The body was identified by James French, a plumber at 25 Raleigh Road, as the child of Amy Gregory, who had been lodging with him since 5 February. Mrs Williams and her daughter, of 2 St George Place, Mortlake Road, also identified the body.

=== The case ===
According to Amy, after she left the workhouse, she went to her parents’ house but her father refused to let her in. When she returned a couple of days later her mother gave her 2d but again her father refused to let her in.

Sarah Burrage, of 58 Alexander Road, saw Amy on the night of 25 January, when she asked about finding a furnished room. Amy told Mrs Burrage that she had been working at the Steam Laundry, and that she "had not a friend or a home to go to and that if I did not take her in, she had no alternative but to walk the streets all night." Amy stayed there two or three weeks and four days, without charge. The baby was not with Amy all that time but was brought back by Mrs Williams on Sunday 10 February. Sarah Burrage said that she "never saw her with any money" and that Mrs Williams was looking after "the baby because the mother went to work."

Charlotte Williams of 2 St George's Place, Mortlake Road, met Amy on 29 January at Mrs Burrage's house and agreed to take the baby for nursing for 5 shillings a week, feeding it condensed milk. After 12 days, 10 February, as she had not received any payment she returned the baby, which was "strong and healthy". Amy had told Mrs Williams that "she did not work at the Steam Laundry but close by." and that she was not getting any support from the father.

Mrs Ann French, of 25 Raleigh Road, saw Amy on the night of 12 February, who was looking for a furnished room. She stayed there 10 days. On 20 February at about 8:40pm Mrs French "heard the baby crying being hushed by the mother as she left the house." Amy returned about 10:15pm without the baby saying that it was with a Mrs Whitrod. Then on the Friday Amy left and never returned.

Mrs Mary Priest, of Garden Road, Mortlake, who had known Amy for about 2½ years, met Amy on 25 January when Amy was looking for furnished rooms and said that she would go home to her mother's. Then on 22 February in the morning Amy returned with the baby clothes, saying that the baby was with Mrs Whitrod at 101 Princes Road, and gave the clothes to Mary for her child. On 23 February she said that "she was going to meet the father of the child and take some money to Mrs Whitrod."

Amy was then arrested about 11:15pm on 24 February at 23, Springfield Terrace, Sandycombe Road, Richmond. At first she tried to deny it was her child but then asked "How did you find it out? I wish I had went [sic] some miles away."

When Amy was charged on 25 February she denied murdering her child saying "it died of starvation. My milk went away through worry. I had no money and no work."

=== Inquest ===
The inquest before the coroner, Braxton Hicks, took place on 1 March at the Vestry Hall, Richmond. The jury, who returned a verdict of "Wilful Murder", agreed to subscribe towards her defense and added to their verdict that "Should the woman be convicted the Coroner's jury wish to recommend her the merciful consideration of the Court."

Frances Maud Gregory was buried in Richmond Old Burial Ground on 4 March 1895.

=== Trial ===
The trial took place at the Old Bailey and on 27 March Amy was convicted of "wilful murder" and sentenced to death.

A PITIFUL TALE

WHY AMY GREGORY MURDERED HER LITTLE ONE
SENTENCED TO DEATH

Amy Gregory, charged with the murder of her infant child, Florence Maud Smart, whose body was found on the ice in the Old Park at Richmond, was brought up for trial at the Old Bailey, London, recently. The woman pleaded not guilty, and wept as she faced the Court. The case for the prosecution was opened by Mr. C. F. Gill. When the child was born, he said, the woman was very poor. She doubtless could not keep it. The story was a pitiful one. So far as could be learned, when the child was a few weeks old she went out with it one evening, telling the woman with whom she lodged that she was taking the child to a woman who would take care of it for her. The following day, a police officer found the child naked, with the exception of a handkerchief tied round its neck, lying on the ice of the Old Deer Park, Richmond. When charged at the police station, Gregory said she did not murder her child. "It died of starvation," she said, "and I didn’t know what to do with it." Frances Jones, a nurse from the Richmond Workhouse Hospital, testified to the birth of the child in the lying-in ward in December last. The mother was known in the workhouse as Amy Smart. Isabel Preston, another nurse, said the woman went into the workhouse for the purpose of her confinement, and told the officials she was a single woman. The child was healthy, and the woman left the house of her own accord. Mrs. Sarah Burridge, of 7, Alexandra Road, Richmond, a respectable-looking middle-aged woman, gave evidence as to Gregory living with her for a fortnight but being too poor to pay for her lodgings. She seemed attached to the child and kind to it. Mrs. Burridge described the mother taking the child out with her on February 11 and returning without it. Mrs. Burridge was called to the mortuary next day, and identified the body of the child. Mrs. Williams, of 2, St. George's Place, Richmond, gave another incident of the tragic history. The mother took the child to her on January 30, and asked her to take care of it. The arrangement was that the mother should pay 5s a week. As the payments were not made, Mrs. Williams took the baby back to the mother at Mrs. Burridge's on February 10. The day it was found dead was February 12. It transpired that prisoner was a married woman, the whereabouts of whose husband the police have failed to discover.

THE CASE FOR THE DEFENCE. For the defence it was urged that at the time she disposed of the child the woman was suffering from want of food, and was unable to feed it. The woman walked about looking for work with the child in her arms on one of the coldest days and nights of our late Arctic winter. The child had probably died in the mother's arms in the cold, and was disposed of by her after death, where it was found, or, her counsel urged, if she was guilty of murder she had committed the act when her suffering from want deprived her of the full power and responsibility of controlling her actions. The child was emaciated, and had had no food for some time before death. After half an hour's consultation the jury returned a verdict of guilty, and strongly recommended the prisoner to mercy because of the distressed state of her mind at the time of the deed. On the jury returning their verdict a most painful scene ensued.

In an incoherent speech, broken with sobs, and with blood streaming down her nostrils, the wretched prisoner related that she left the workhouse with her baby, and went to her father's. He would not let her enter, and then she went a weary round with her infant, searching now for work and now for small help from her women acquaintances, one of whom temporarily took her baby from her as it was cold and hungry – for even the natural sustenance for her infant was lost to this miserable mother. She had herself such pains and such misgivings about getting work that she could not sleep at night, and she again sought succour at home. Her mother spared twopence for food for the baby, her sister could lend her nothing, and her father, with oaths and revilings, as she declared, refused her a crumb of the food which stood on the table. When she was put out into the street she went to a baker's, spent the twopence on biscuits, and provided therewith supper and breakfast for the baby. She ended with a passionate declaration that she had been a good daughter to her father, giving him the last penny out of her pocket when she was at home. The chaplain then took up his place on the judge's left, the black cap was placed on his lordship's head, and sentence of death was passed. “Oh, me! I did not know what I was doing," sobbed the woman. Mr. Avory, the Clerk of Arraigns, himself visibly affected, next had to ask her if there was any reason why the law should not be carried out. She did not know the meaning of this query, which is always asked of women under sentence of death, until the wardress explained it. She answered “No," and was taken down to the cells.

A PETITION. Much pity is felt in Richmond for the unhappy woman. A petition is being numerously signed for presentation to the Home Secretary praying for a reprieve on the ground that absolute destitution and despair had completely deranged her intellect before she committed the act.

In England a death sentence could be commuted or permanently postponed if the prisoner were pregnant.

=== Plea for clemency ===
The Western Daily Press editorial commented "By the law of the country every citizen is entitled to receive the necessaries of life. It is the function of the poor-law administration to see that this right is assured. The circumstances under which Amy Gregory was condemned to wander with her child, homeless and starving in the public streets, are, it is true, somewhat obscure; but surely the relief which might have saved one feeble life, and spared the mother the terrible ordeal of being publicly condemned to death, should have been easily accessible. Was the relief easily accessible, or were the conditions attached to the acceptance of public charity such that Amy Gregory preferred to face the dreaded alternative? If the workhouse is made so repugnant to the poor, then the Poor Law stands sorely in need of that amendment which, it is hoped, may result from the report of the Royal Commission who recommendations are now overdue."

A letter in the Thames Valley Times did not agree with her account "that in Richmond a friendless, starving, hopeless woman had no hand held out to her and was left to wander and die." The editorial in the Thames Valley Times noted that "the woman killed her child not because she could not obtain food and shelter, but because she would not do so, either at the workhouse or elsewhere at the price of a curtailment of her own liberty" and that "she was offered shelter in the Rescue Home, but did not avail herself of it. She could have had regular employment if her mind had been set upon it. She refused all this, and then being in want, and finding her child a burden to her, she cruelly murdered it."

There were calls for more lenient sentences for infanticide, as reported in The Spectator. Its editorial noted "one reason why in all ages infanticide has been so lightly regarded is that it is a crime of which no man can in his own person by possibility be a victim. It is quite right that Amy Gregory should not be hanged; but the further cry that she should not be punished, is a plea that all women should be absolute over the lives of their little children, a plea the consequences of which only Mr. Waugh could adequately depict. Are we really going half-mad with pity for everybody except the totally defenceless? If not, why in the name of Christianity, as well as common-sense, do we object to the Home Secretary protecting babies of three months from being throttled?"

The jury requested that a letter be written by Mr. Justice Collins to the Home Secretary, Mr Asquith, asking for mercy for Amy and a petition for a reprieve of the death-sentence was raised. A petition was also sent by fifty married Richmond women.

The Case of Amy Gregory

Miss Jenner's Appeal for Clemency
A Satisfactory Response

Immediately on the sentence of death being passed upon the woman, Amy Gregory, for the murder of her child, under distressingly painful circumstances, Miss Gertrude Jenner, Wenvoe, interested herself, with characteristic promptitude and energy, in the welfare of the unfortunate culprit. She drew up a dutiful address to the Queen, praying her Majesty to commute the sentence, and got it very extensively signed in the Law Courts on Saturday, and also in the Paddington district, whilst in one large hotel near Russell-square, W.C., some sixty signatures were readily appended to it as soon as Miss Jenner had asked the proprietor's leave to exhibit it. Afterwards she took the document herself to the Home Office, it being the second that she had delivered there.

She has received the following letter from the Home Office:-1 April 1896. To Miss Gertrude Jenner, 7, Gower-street, W.C. Madam,—The Secretary of State having considered the case of Amy Gregory, sentenced to death for murder, I am directed to acquaint you that he has felt warranted under all the circumstances of the case to advise her Majesty to respite the capital sentence, with a view to its commutation.—-I am, Madam, your obedient servant, (Signed) V. E. DIGBY.

The last British woman to be executed for killing her own child was Rebecca Smith, who was hanged in Wiltshire in 1849. In 1922, the Infanticide Act abolished the death penalty for women who murdered their newborn babies if it could be shown that the woman in question had had her balance of mind disturbed as a direct result of giving birth.

=== Pardon ===
Amy Gregory was subsequently conveyed to Holloway Prison, and then to Woking Prison.

On 11 April she was given a conditional pardon; the death sentence was reprieved but she was to be "kept in Penal Servitude for Life."

She served five years at HM Prison Aylesbury and was released on licence in March 1899. She then went to the Oxford House of Refuge, Floyd's Row, St Aldates, Oxford, which offered temporary accommodation until she was found a placement with a family in Bournemouth.

== Later life ==
She appears to have eventually been reconciled with her husband. By 1901 they were living in Isleworth at 37 Napier Road with their son James; their daughter was with her paternal grandparents, James and Sarah, at 48 Albert Road, Richmond. In 1911 they were back living in Richmond.

Her daughter, Amy Sarah Gregory, married Percy Wooldridge at Richmond in 1911. Her son, James William Gregory, was married to Charlotte Fennerty (1888–1923) at Richmond and Liverpool in 1912 and moved to West Derby, Liverpool, where his wife was born. They had two children. He joined the 1st Battalion The King's (Liverpool Regiment) and was killed in action on 17 May 1915.

In 1939 Amy was living at 48 Lock Road, Ham with her widowed daughter. Frederick was living in an almshouse in Richmond. Amy died in 1956.

== See also ==
- Barnes Child Murder
