= Westerley Ware =

Garden in Kew, England

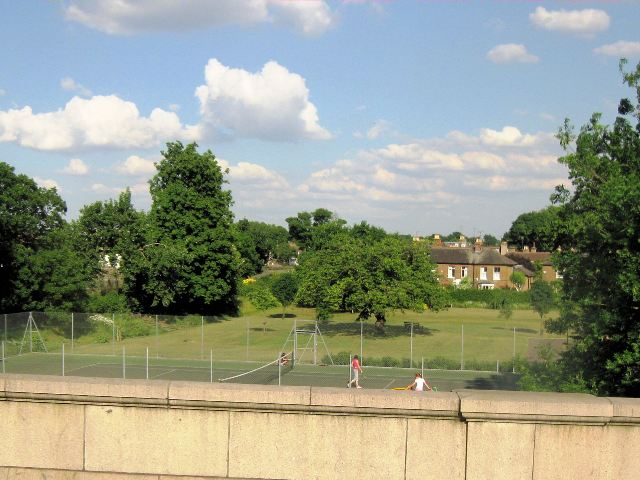
- Westerley Ware in 2009
- Interactive map of Westerley Ware
- Type: Urban park
- Location: Waterloo Place, Kew Green, Kew, London Borough of Richmond upon Thames
- Coordinates: 51.4859°N 0.2865°W
- Operator: Richmond upon Thames Borough Council
- Status: Open all year

Westerley Ware is a small garden and recreation ground in Kew in the London Borough of Richmond upon Thames. It is at the foot of Kew Bridge, between Waterloo Place (a row of houses and flats off Kew Green) and the Thames riverbank. Historically common land, it has a memorial garden – bordered by hedges – to the fallen in the First World War, a grass area, three hard tennis courts and a children's playground. Since 1939 it has been managed by the local authority, which is now Richmond upon Thames Council.

== History and etymology ==
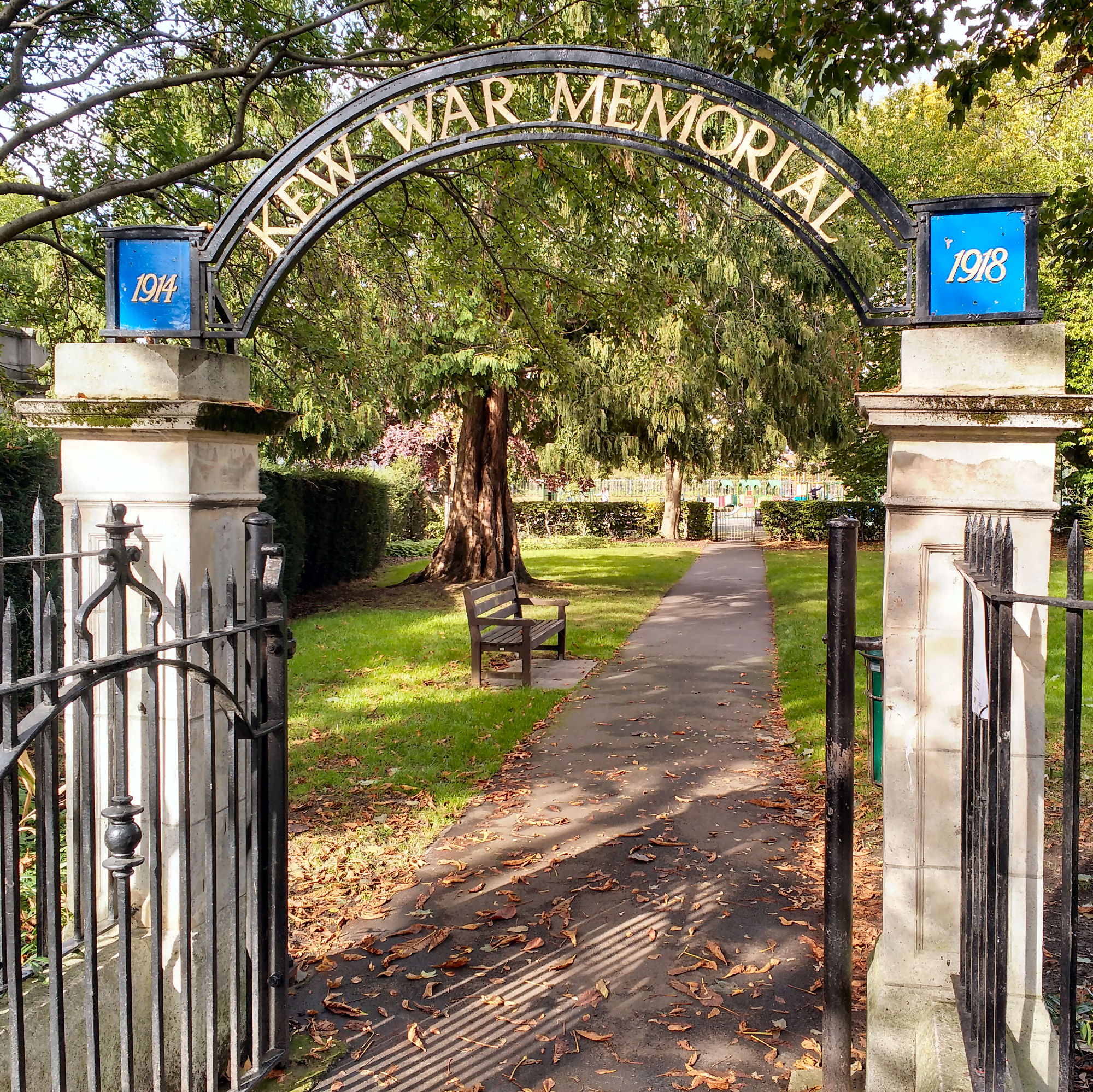
The Kew War Memorial gate at Westerley Ware

Until the 18th century, Westerley Ware was much larger and was almost certainly used by fishermen as a place to beach their boats and to dry and mend their nets. Its name refers to the use of netting weirs or "wares" to catch fish.

== Westerley Ware Association ==
In 1997 local residents in Kew formed the Westerley Ware Association which has raised funds for projects to improve the park and to employ a part-time gardener. In 2007 it successfully raised funds from the Council’s Initiative Fund to install new entrance gates. These were designed and forged by a local blacksmith, Shelley Thomas.

== See also ==
- Kew Mortuary
