= Home Office Baby =

Protest

The Home Office Baby was an 1884 publicity stunt perpetrated by the Reverend John Mirehouse, the eccentric rector of Colsterworth, Lincolnshire, England.

Mirehouse was in dispute with Home Secretary Sir William Harcourt over the provision of a local graveyard; the churchyard had been closed without a new cemetery being made available in the parish and the rector had difficulty in finding burials for people who had died. Mirehouse mailed the corpse of a still born infant to Harcourt, marked "perishable". It arrived at the Home Office on 2 November.

At the inquest the coroner, Mr Braxton Hicks, said "he thought it was unnecessary for him to say anything more than he had done, as the act of Mr. Mirehouse was one of the most indecent he had heard of for a long time, and ought to be reprobated."

Later that month, ecclesiastical lawyer Walter Phillimore gave the opinion that Mirehouse had committed no offence known to the canon law of the Church of England and could not be disciplined.

== Bibliography ==
- Simpson, A. W. B. (1984). Cannibalism and the Common Law: The Story of the Tragic Last Voyage of the Mignonette and the Strange Legal Proceedings to Which It Gave Rise. Chicago: University of Chicago Press. p. 245. ISBN 9780226759425.
