= Deptford poisonings =

Murder case in the United Kingdom

Between 1886 and 1889, five suspicious deaths occurred in Deptford, United Kingdom. Amelia Winters was suspected of murder after it was discovered that she had insured the lives of twenty-two people, which allowed her to receive payments for five deaths. As part of the inquiry, three bodies were exhumed, with post-mortem findings non-definitively pointing to poisoning. Most of the alleged victims were Winters' relatives by blood or affinity who had moved into or temporarily stayed in Winter's household.

Winters died before going to trial. Her daughter, Elizabeth Frost, was suspected of complicity and was indicted, but the murder charges were dropped. However, she was convicted of forgery for falsifying insurance documents and sentenced to seven years of penal servitude.

== Events ==
The victims in the murder cases were Sidney Bolton, aged 11, the son of a niece living with Winters; William Sutton, the elderly father of another relative; and Elizabeth Frost, the mother-in-law of the daughter Elizabeth Frost. The doctor's certificate had given the cause of death as 'gastrodynia, diarrhoea and convulsions'.

When Joseph Winters, Amellia's husband, discovered the insurance policies, he went to the police. Investigators determined that Winters had insured the lives of 22 persons for a total of £240 with the Liverpool Victoria Friendly Society. Five of these individuals had died by 1886, and the society had paid out for them. Winters also had 14 policies with the Prudential Assurance Company, which had also paid out for the same five deaths.

There had been no checks on her relationships with the insured people. On the Liverpool Victoria's insurance form for Sidney Bolton, she had just written 'X' against his mother's name.

=== Other deaths ===
Investigators identified other possible poisoning victims of Winters. No criminal charges were brought for these deaths.

- Benjamin Winters, the brother of Joseph Winters. Winters had insured him for 18 guineas. In 1885, he left Greenwich Workhouse to stay at the Winters' house for a holiday. While there, Benjamin "was taken ill with diarrhaea, sickness, pains in the stomach, and similar symptoms to those described in the previous cases. Dr. McNaughten attended the man, who expired in a few days in a fit."
- William Winters, age five, Winters' grandson; she had insured him for £5. In the summer of 1886, William was brought from the hospital to stay with Winters. William died a few days later.
- Ann Bolton, an elderly woman insured by Winters for £3 10s. In November 1886, she died at Friendly Street, Deptford, after Winters had been nursing her.

A witness in the case, George Francis Dear, who had lodged with Winters, later committed suicide by hanging after finding out that Winters had insured his life with a Liverpool society for 19 guineas.

== Inquest ==
According to the autopsy evidence at the coroner's inquest, "In Sutton's case, the appearances were quite consistent with death from an irritant poison. In the case of Elizabeth Frost the state of preservation in which the intestines were found indicated the presence of some preservative such as arsenic", (Note: During this period, arsenic's preservative properties led to its use in taxidermy and embalming.) as reported in The Colonist at the time.

Evidence of motive was presented showing that between July 1886 and February 1889 five people insured by Winters had died and she had claimed and received payment against the policies she held for Sutton and Bolton.

In July 1889, at the end of the inquest, the coroner's jury delivered a verdict that the deaths were caused by "wilful murder", implicating Winters and Frost, upon which the coroner committed them for trial at the Central Criminal Court, for their culpability to be determined.

== Winters' death ==
Winters died before she could be brought to trial. However, she made a deathbed confession of guilt to her husband and daughter. No inquest was held for her death; the doctor said it was the result of 'marasmus' – a general wasting away.'

Winters was buried in Brockley cemetery in Lewisham on 22 July 1889 in unconsecrated ground. The burial was kept secret with police present to deter demonstrations.

== Frost's trial ==
Elizabeth Frost was indicted for murder, but the charges were dropped. She was tried at the Old Bailey in July 1889 on charges of forging a document for the payment of money, with intent to defraud, and was found guilty. Frost was sentenced to seven years' penal servitude.

== Effects on life insurers' practices ==
The coroner for Surrey, Athelstan Braxton Hicks, had written a letter to The Times on 14 February 1889 listing eleven proposals for combating the dangers of child life insurance. The Deptford poisoning case was influential in tightening up the 1875 Friendly Societies Act.
