= Burial of Drowned Persons Acts 1808 and 1886 =

Act of the Parliament of the United Kingdom

Burial of Drowned Persons Act 1808 (Note: The citation of this act by this short title was authorised by section 1 of, and the first schedule to, the Short Titles Act 1896. Due to the repeal of those provisions it is now authorised by section 19(2) of the Interpretation Act 1978.)
- Act of Parliament
- Parliament of the United Kingdom
- Long title: An Act for providing suitable Interment in Church-yards or Parochial Burying Grounds in England, for such dead Human Bodies as may be cast on Shore from the Sea, in Cases of Wreck or otherwise.
- Citation: 48 Geo. 3. c. 75
- Territorial extent: England and Wales (Note: Section 1.)

Dates
- Royal assent: 18 June 1808
- Commencement: 18 June 1808
- Repealed: 5 July 1948 (Note: The National Assistance Act (Appointed Day) Order 1948 (SI 1948/1218).)
Other legislation
Amended by	Burial of Drowned Persons Act 1886; Statute Law Revision Act 1872 (No. 2); Summary Jurisdiction Act 1884; Statute Law Revision Act 1888
Repealed by	National Assistance Act 1948

Status: Repealed

Text of statute as originally enacted

The Burial of Drowned Persons Act 1808 (48 Geo. 3. c. 75), also known as Grylls' Act, was an act of the Parliament of the United Kingdom. The act provides that unclaimed bodies of dead persons cast ashore from the sea should be removed by the churchwardens and overseers of the parish, and decently interred in consecrated ground.

The passage of the act was one of the consequences of the wreck of the Royal Navy frigate HMS Anson in Mount's Bay in 1807. Prior to the passage of this act it was customary to unceremoniously bury drowned seamen without shroud or coffin, in unconsecrated ground. However, the burial in this manner of the many dead from the Anson, and the length of time that many of the bodies remained unburied, caused controversy and led to a local solicitor, Thomas Grylls, drafting a new law to provide more decent treatment for drowned seamen. This law was introduced to parliament by John Hearle Tremayne, Member of Parliament for Cornwall, and was enacted in 1808.

A monument to the drowned sailors, and to the passing of Grylls' Act, stands above Loe Bar, near Porthleven, Cornwall. The construction of nearby Porthleven harbour was another of the consequences of the loss of the Anson.

== Subsequent developments ==
Burial of Drowned Persons Act 1886
- Act of Parliament
- Parliament of the United Kingdom
- Long title: An Act to amend the Law in respect to the Discovery and Interment of Persons drowned.
- Citation: 49 & 50 Vict. c. 20
- Territorial extent: United Kingdom

Dates
- Royal assent: 4 June 1886
- Commencement: 4 June 1886 (Note: The Acts of Parliament (Commencement) Act 1793.)
- Repealed: 5 July 1948
Other legislation
Amends	Burial of Drowned Persons Act 1808
Repealed by	National Assistance Act 1948

Status: Repealed

Text of statute as originally enacted

This act was amended by the Burial of Drowned Persons Act 1886 (49 & 50 Vict. c. 20), to extend its applicability to bodies found in, or cast on shore from, all tidal or navigable waters. This was needed following the case of the wreck of the Princess Alice, when various parishes refused to pay the cost of interment. The parish was responsible for burial, under the Burial of Drowned Persons Act, and a fee of 5 shillings (a crown) was also paid by the parish for the recovery of drowned bodies.

The whole act was repealed by section 62(3) of, and part III of the seventh schedule to, the National Assistance Act 1948 (11 & 12 Geo. 6. c. 29), which came into force on 5 July 1948.
