= Infant Life Protection Act 1872 =

Act of the Parliament of the United Kingdom

Infant Life Protection Act 1872 (Note: Section 16.)
- Act of Parliament
- Parliament of the United Kingdom
- Long title: An Act for protecting infant life
- Citation: 35 & 36 Vict. c. 38
- Territorial extent: United Kingdom

Dates
- Royal assent: 25 July 1872
- Commencement: 1 November 1872 (Note: Section 15.)
- Repealed: 1 January 1898
Other legislation
Repealed by	Infant Life Protection Act 1897

Status: Repealed

Text of statute as originally enacted

The Infant Life Protection Act (35 & 36 Vict. c. 38) was an act of the Parliament of the United Kingdom passed in 1872 to stop the practice of baby farming, where unwanted babies were boarded out for money and frequently neglected or killed. It required the registration of all residences where more than one child was taken for payment and kept for longer than 24 hours. It was later replaced by the Infant Life Protection Act 1897 (60 & 61 Vict. c. 57), which extended the time frame to 48 hours and raised the age of the notified child from one years to five.

== Background ==
Baby farming, a term coined by the British Medical Journal in 1867, generally referred to the practice of placing infants, particularly those born to unmarried or working mothers, with women or families who received payment for caring for them. Before 1871 in the United Kingdom, the death rate among these babies was disproportionately high.

== Subsequent developments ==
The whole act was repealed by section ? of the Infant Life Protection Act 1897 (60 & 61 Vict. c. 57), which came into force on 1 January 1898.
