= Fire screen =

Device to put in front of a fireplace

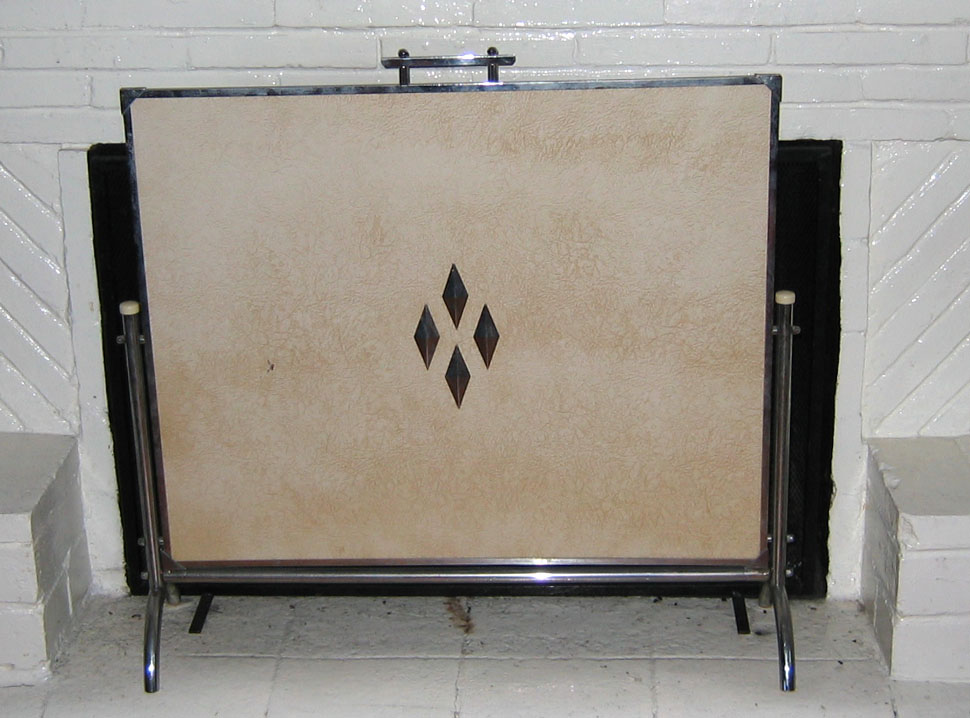
Vintage decorative fire screen, c. 1950s

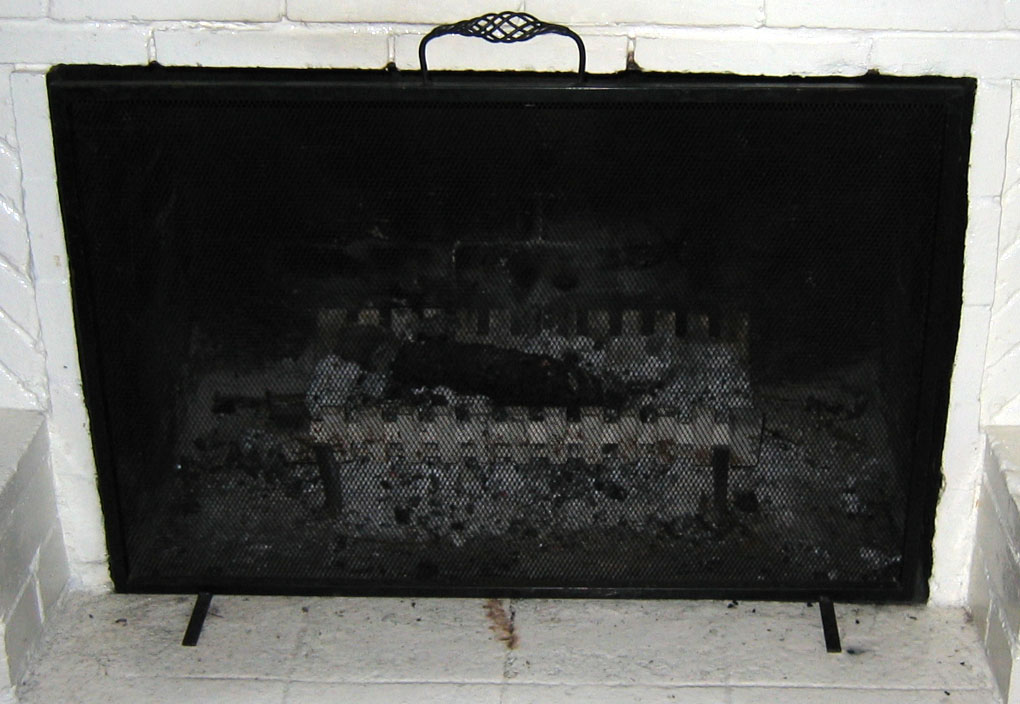
Modern black metal and mesh fire screen

A fire screen or fireguard began as a form of furniture that acted as a shield between the occupants of a room and the fireplace, and its primary function was to reduce the discomfort of excessive heat from a log fire. Early firescreens were generally shaped as flat panels standing on attached feet, or as adjustable shield-shaped panels mounted on tripod table legs.

Firescreens in the modern home have become decorative shields of sheet metal, glass, or wire mesh that can be placed in front of a fireplace opening to protect the room from open flames and flying embers that may be emitted by the fire.

Fire screens were used to cover the fireplace when nothing was burning inside it, and make it look more decorative.

== Types of fire screen ==
The three-panel fire screen, which covers the fireplace almost completely, has two side panels angled away from the central panel. It is an effective way of providing decoration in a room.

The horse screen, or cheval screen (cheval is the French word for horse) was in common use from the 18th century. It is a wide screen having two feet on each side, the arrangement of the feet giving the screen its name. Placed in front of the unused fireplace, the decorated screen improves the appearance of a room. Screens are decorated with embroidery, papier maché, painted wood or perhaps stained glass; the frame and feet might be carved.

The pole screen also began to appear in the 18th century. It is a smaller screen placed on a vertical pole which is mounted on a tripod; placed between a lit fire and an occupant of the room, the screen can be adjusted up or down to shield the person's face from the heat. The screen might be rectangular or a more decorous shape, and is decorated perhaps with embroidery, lacquer or paint.

The banner screen is similar to a pole screen; instead of a solid screen there is a loose piece of silk or embroidery, weighted with tassels on the lower edge; like a banner, it is supported from the top edge by a crossbar connected to a pole.

== Some antique fire screens ==
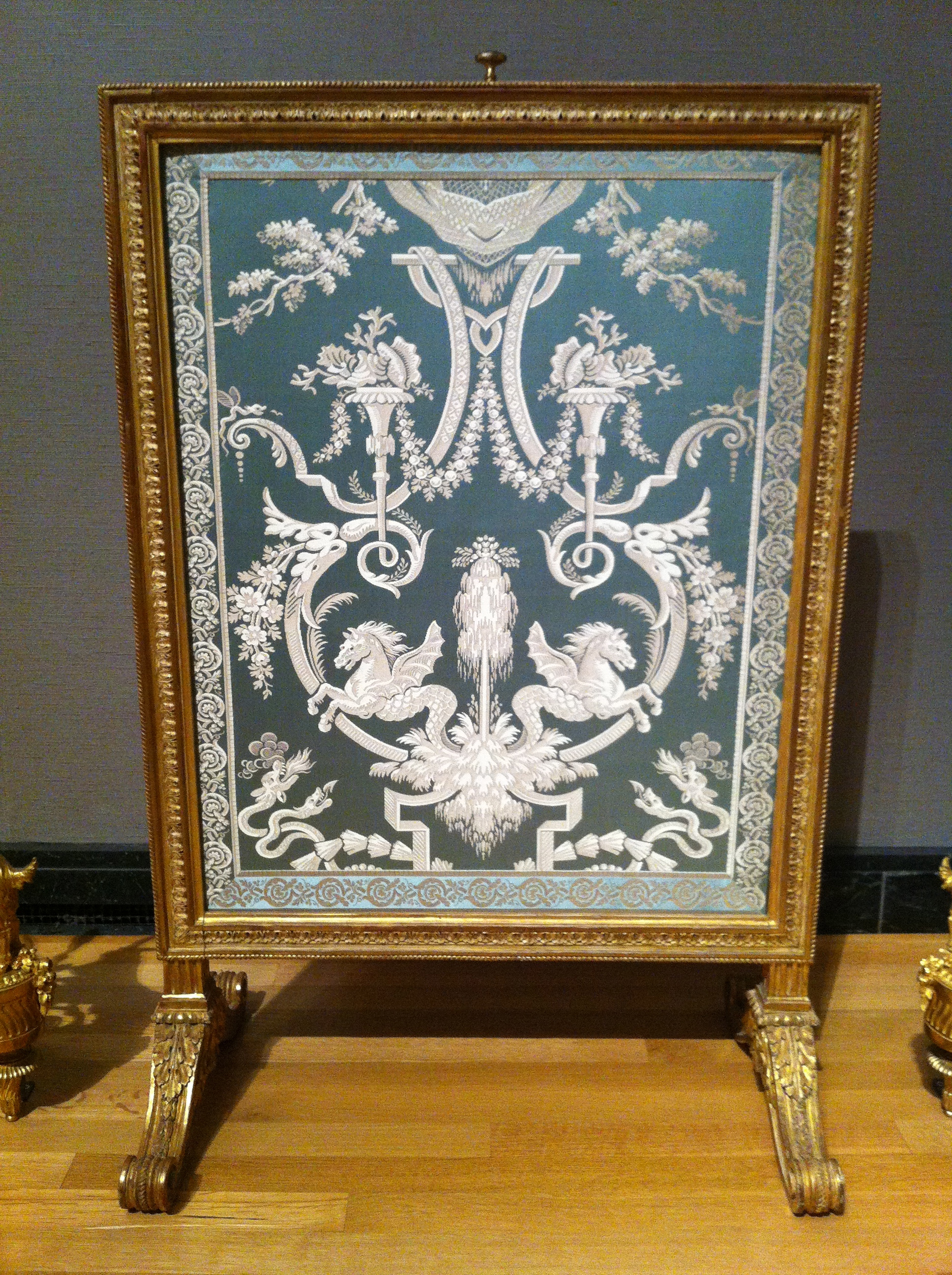
French fire screen, 1787

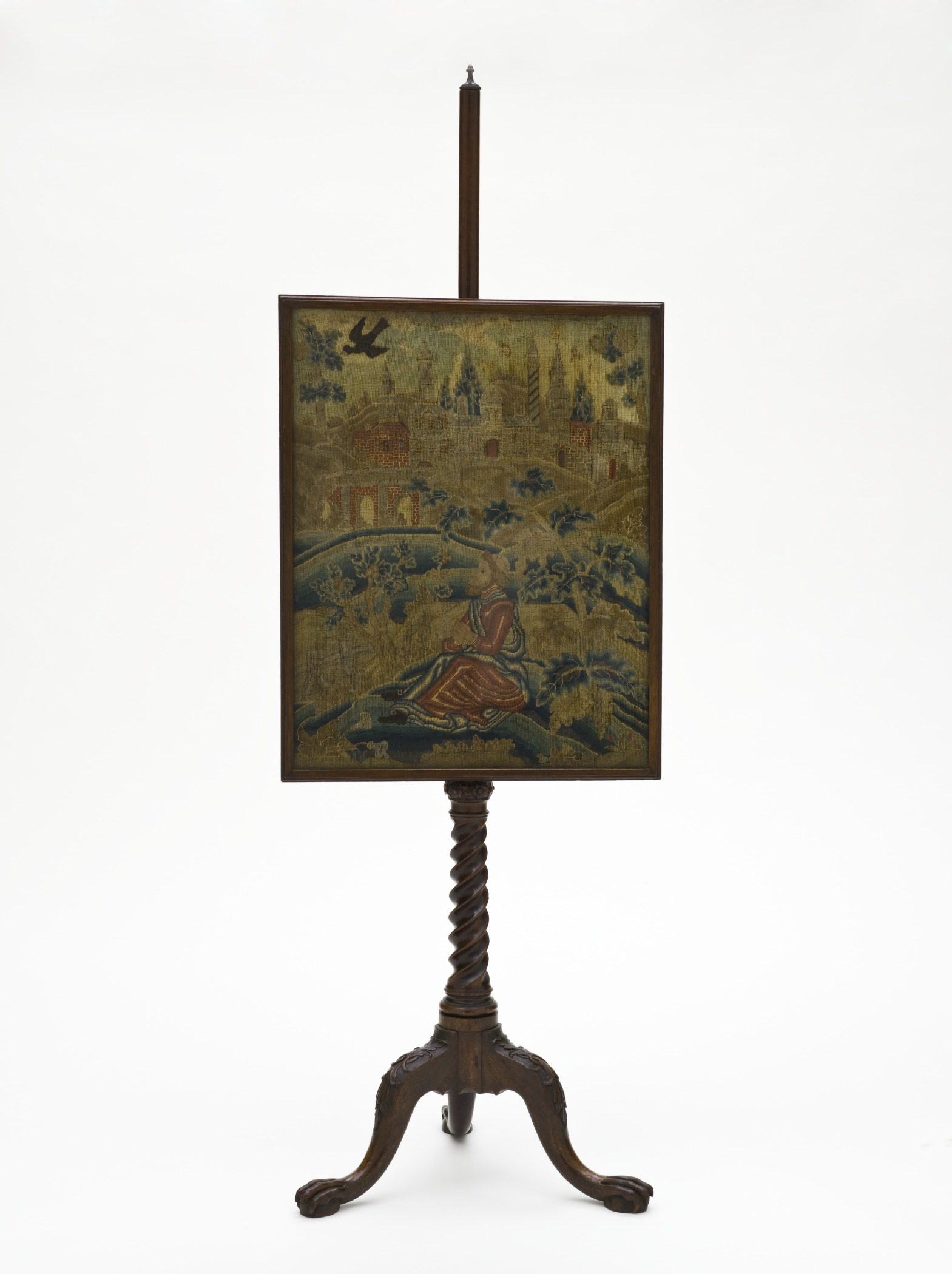
Pole fire screen, Massachusetts, about 1780

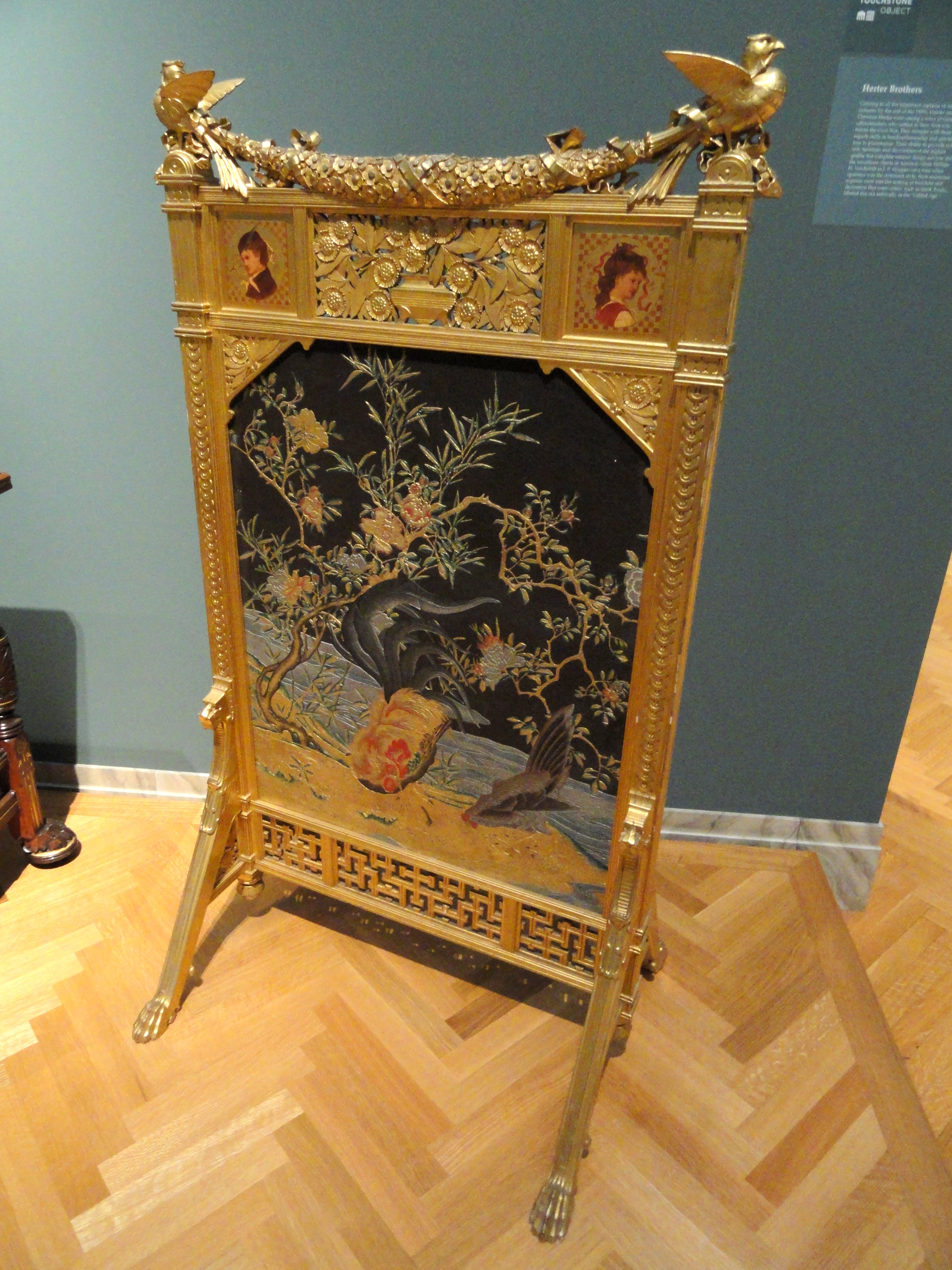
Fire screen of about 1880, with brocaded silk and gilded wood
