= Coroners' Society of England and Wales =

The Coroners' Society of England and Wales is the representative body for coroners in England and Wales.

The organisation was formed in 1846 and held its inaugural meeting on 4 February of that year.
