= Washboard =

Washboard may refer to:

- Washboard (laundry), a tool for washing clothes
- Washboard (musical instrument), a percussion instrument
- Washboarding, corrugation on gravel or dirt roads
- Short for washboard abs, visible rectus abdominis muscle
