= Shige =

Shige is a Japanese surname and given name. It may also be a Chinese given name. Notable people with the name include:

== Surname ==
- Taira Shige (茂平; born 1993), Japanese footballer
- Yukio Shige (茂幸雄; born mid-1940s), Japanese police officer
- Yumiko Shige (重 由美子; 1965–2018), Japanese sailor

== Given name ==
- Peng Shige (彭实戈; born 1947), Chinese mathematician
- Shige Sakakura (坂倉しげ; 1868–1915), Japanese baby farmer and serial killer
