= Baby farming =

Charging to take custody of an infant

Baby farming was a historical form of foster care where unrelated individuals accepted custody of an infant or young child in exchange for payment from the mother or parents.

Baby farming was associated with the Victorian era and changes to family structures that occurred during the Industrial Revolution, where single mothers and working-class parents were unable to care for some or all of their children and could not rely on extended family for child care. The duration of baby farming arrangements varied, with short-term arrangements for infants encompassing wet nursing and longer or permanent arrangements being closer to adoption.

The term baby farming was typically used pejoratively. The practice was unregulated and widely associated with neglect, with the baby farmers incentivised to take on large numbers of children and spend as little as possible on the children in their care. In a number of high-profile cases, baby farmers were found to have killed children by neglect or deliberately murdered those in their care, disguising the deaths among high rates of child mortality.

== Description ==
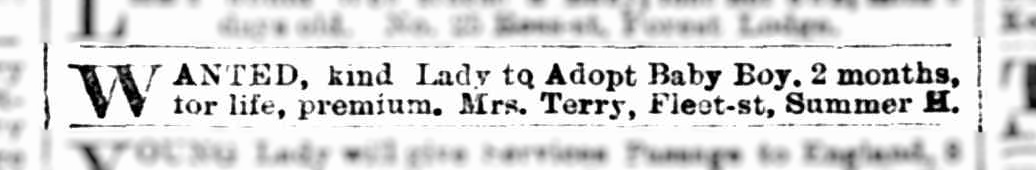
An advertisement that baby farmers John and Sarah Makin AKA The Hatpin Murderers responded to (from the Evening News 27 April 1892)

The use of foster care in 18th-century Britain by middle-class parents was described by Claire Tomalin in her biography of Jane Austen, who was fostered in the 1760s in this manner, as were all her siblings, from when they were a few months old until they were toddlers. Tomalin emphasizes the emotional distance this created.

Important historical context for the practice is the Poor Law Amendment Act 1834, which denied the poor the right to subsistence. In particular, single mothers were then forced to work in prison-like workhouses.

In late-Victorian Britain (and, less commonly, in Australia and the United States), baby farming was the practice of accepting custody of an infant or child in exchange for payment. Though baby farmers were paid in the understanding that care would be provided, the term "baby farmer" was used as an insult, and improper treatment was usually implied. Illegitimacy and its attendant social stigma were usually the impetus for a mother's decision to put her children "out to nurse" with a baby farmer, but baby farming also encompassed foster care and adoption in the period before they were regulated by British law in the mid 19th century. Wealthier women would also put their infants out to be cared for in the homes of villagers.

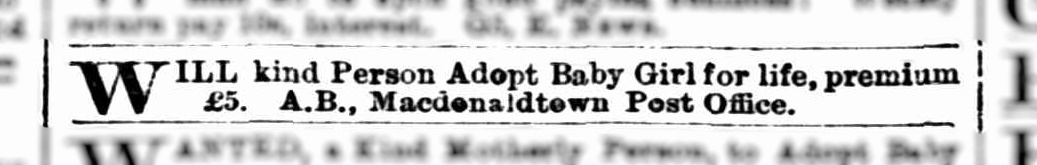
An advertisement that baby farmers John and Sarah Makin AKA The Hatpin Murderers responded to (from the Evening News, 4 May 1892)

Particularly in the case of lump-sum adoptions, it was more profitable for the baby farmer if the infant or child she adopted died, since the small payment could not cover the care of the child for long. Some baby farmers adopted numerous children and then neglected them or murdered them outright (see infanticide). Several baby farmers were tried for murder, manslaughter, or criminal neglect and were hanged. Margaret Waters (executed 1870) and Amelia Dyer (executed 1896) were two infamous British baby farmers, as were Amelia Sach and Annie Walters (executed 1903). The last baby farmer to be executed in Britain was Rhoda Willis, who was hanged in Wales in 1907.

The only woman to be executed in New Zealand, Minnie Dean, was a baby farmer, although in 1926, a male baby farmer, Daniel Cooper, was executed for the death of his pregnant first wife and two subsequent infants. In Australia, baby-farmer Frances Knorr was executed for infanticide in 1894. Although John and Sarah Makin were also convicted of infanticide, only John Makin had been executed a year earlier (1893) in Sydney for this crime.

In Scandinavia there was a euphemism for this activity: änglamakerska (Swedish, including Hilda Nilsson) and englemagerske (Danish, including Dagmar Overby), both literally meaning a "(female) angel maker".

== Decline ==
An undercover investigation of baby-farming, reported in 1870 in a letter to The Times, concluded that "My conviction is that children are murdered in scores by these women, that adoption is only a fine phrase for slow or sudden death".

Spurred by a series of articles that appeared in the British Medical Journal in 1867, the Parliament of the United Kingdom began to regulate baby farming in 1872 with the passage of the Infant Life Protection Act 1872.

London coroner Athelstan Braxton Hicks gave evidence in 1896 on the dangers of baby-farming to the Select Committee on Infant Life Protection Bill. One case that he cited was that of Mrs. Arnold, who had been "sweating" infants legally by doing so one at a time. At another inquest, the jury were of the "opinion that there has been gross neglect in the case" but were unable to allocate responsibility. They added the rider that "The jury are strongly of opinion that further legislation in what are usually known as baby farming cases is greatly needed, and particularly that the required legislation should extend to the care of one infant only, and that the age of the infant should not be limited to one year, but rather to five years and that it should be an offence for any person undertaking the care of such infant to sub farm it."

The Infant Life Protection Act 1897 finally empowered local authorities to control the registration of nurses responsible for more than one infant under the age of five for a period longer than 48 hours.

A series of acts passed over the next seventy years, including the Children Act 1908 (8 Edw. 7. c. 67), under which "no infant could be kept in a home that was so unfit and so overcrowded as to endanger its health, and no infant could be kept by an unfit nurse who threatened, by neglect or abuse, its proper care and maintenance."

The Adoption of Children (Regulation) Act 1939 gradually placed adoption and foster care under the protection and regulation of the state.

== Postwar Britain ==
In the 1960s and 1970s, thousands of West African children were privately fostered by white families in the UK in a phenomenon known as 'farming'. The biological parents were usually students in the UK who also had a job. They placed advertisements in the newspapers looking for foster families to care for their children.

== Known baby farmers with criminal convictions ==
The following is a list of baby farmers with criminal convictions associated with their operations, categorized by country and Number of Victims:

=== Australia ===
- Ellen Batts
- Frances Knorr
- John and Sarah Makin
- Alice Mitchell

=== Canada ===
- Grey Nuns of Montreal (suspect: related from a newspaper)
- Lila Gladys & William Peach Young

=== Denmark ===
- Dagmar Overbye

=== Germany ===
- Elisabeth Wiese

=== Hungary ===
- Mária Orbán Juhász
- Mari-Szalai Jáger

=== Italy ===
- Sisters of Saint Anne (suspect: related from a newspaper)

=== Japan ===
- Aochababa
- Tane Hasegawa
- Ryuji Hirahara and Saku Sawamura
- Anrō Ishibashi
- Miyuki Ishikawa
- Hatsutarō Kawamata
- Kobata Matsu
- Jitsuo Koguchi
- Ichi Minogata
- Keijiro and Gen Nagai
- Kichinosuke Nakagawa
- Ihachiro Nakashima
- Ushitaro Nakauchi
- Shige Sakakura
- Yosaburo Shibata
- Nakako Yasui

=== Mexico ===
- Felícitas Sánchez Aguillón

=== New Zealand ===
- Daniel Cooper (murderer)
- Minnie Dean

=== Norway ===
- Kristiania Angelmakers

=== Portugal ===
- Luísa de Jesus
- Vila Viçosa Baby Farmer

=== Poland ===
- Marianna Skublińska

=== Sweden ===
- Hilda Nilsson
- Alva Nordberg

=== United Kingdom ===
- Amelia Dyer
- Frances Knorr
- Amelia Sach and Annie Walters
- Margaret Waters
- Ada Williams
- Rhoda Willis
- Jessie King

=== United States ===
- Julia Fortmeyer
- Helene Auguste Geisen-Volk
- Georgia Tann
- Elizabeth Ashmead
- Henrietta Bamberger

== In popular culture ==
- The title character in Charles Dickens' Oliver Twist spends his first years in a "baby farm."
- The eponymous heroine puts her newborn "out to nurse" with a baby farmer in George Moore's Esther Waters (1894).
- The main character in Perfume, Jean-Baptiste Grenouille, is orphaned shortly after birth and brought up in a baby farmer style orphanage.
- The character of Mrs Sucksby in Sarah Waters's novel Fingersmith is a baby farmer.
- In the Gilbert and Sullivan operetta H.M.S. Pinafore, the character of Buttercup reveals that, when a baby farmer, she had switched two babies of different social classes. This is part of a satire of class hierarchy in Victorian England.
- The book Mama's Babies by Gary Crew is the story of a child of a baby farmer in the 1890s.
- The silent film Sparrows (1926) with Mary Pickford was set in a baby farm in the Southern swamps.
- In The Fire Thief trilogy of novels, a baby farm figures prominently.
- The plot of Emma Donoghue's Frog Music is initiated by the protagonist retrieving her son from a baby farm.
- Australian musical The Hatpin features a mother's experience with baby farmers and was inspired by the true story of Amber Murray and the Makin family.
- Australian poet Judith Rodriguez has written a series of poems based on Melbourne baby farmer Frances Knorr in The Hanging of Minnie Thwaites.
- The BBC TV soap opera EastEnders features an evil character called Babe Smith, who is exposed as a baby farmer along with Queenie Trott. It is revealed that while in Ramsgate, they took young pregnant women in and sold their babies to the highest bidder. In a 2024 plotline involving George Knight, it is revealed by his adopted parents Eddie and Gloria that they were paid to adopt him.
- In a March 2013 episode of Syfy's Haunted Collector, John Zaffis and his team discovered that a Boston cigar bar was used to house a baby farm in the 1870s. Ms. Elwood, who ran the farm, was found to have abused and even killed some of the infants there. They also found a syringe buried in the building's foundation dating to the time period of the farm.
