= Hilda Nilsson =

Swedish serial killer (1876–1917)

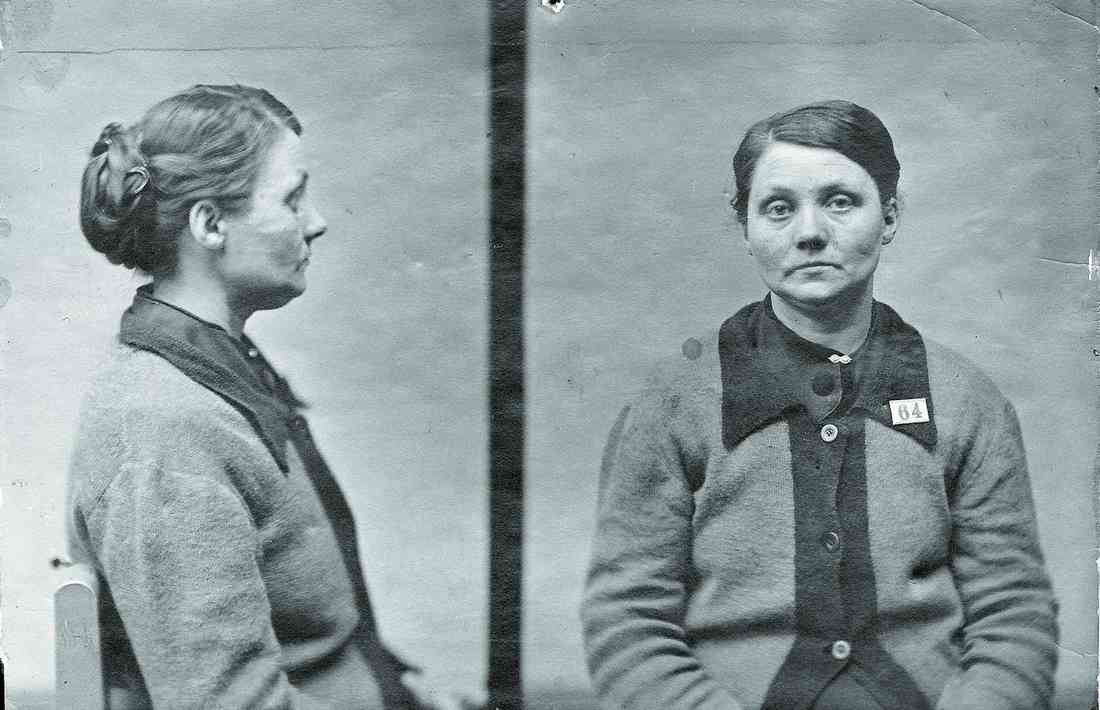
- Police mugshots of Nilsson in 1917
- Born: 24 May 1876; Helsingborg, Sweden
- Died: 10 August 1917 (aged 41); Landskrona, Sweden
- Cause of death: Suicide by hanging
- Motive: Financial trouble
- Conviction: Murder (8 counts)
- Penalty: Death

Hilda Nilsson (24 May 1876 – 10 August 1917) was a Swedish serial killer from Helsingborg who became known as "the angel maker on Bruks Street". She is one of Sweden's most notorious female serial killers.

In 1917, she was imprisoned for murdering eight children. (Note: Some sources indicate her victims may number as many as 17 children.) Her trial, which included a mental examination, began on 2 June 1917. At the conclusion of the trial on 15 June 1917, she was sentenced to death. She escaped execution by committing suicide while in jail in Landskrona. She hanged herself with a linen cloth which she had tied to a cell door, and was thus the last person sentenced to death in Sweden not to have the sentence commuted.

== Background ==
Hilda Nilsson and her husband Gustaf lived in Helsingborg. The couple had accrued large debts and needed a way to pay their bills.

As a way to raise cash, Nilsson cared for infants in return for money from unmarried mothers who needed help. At that time, having a child outside of marriage was considered to be a shameful moral crime, and caring for these children for a fee (known as baby farming) was a common practice.

Nilsson kept her home in a good, clean condition, which made mothers more willing to leave their unwanted children in her care. However, the small sums of money she received were far from what she needed to support all the children she had agreed to look after.

== Murders ==
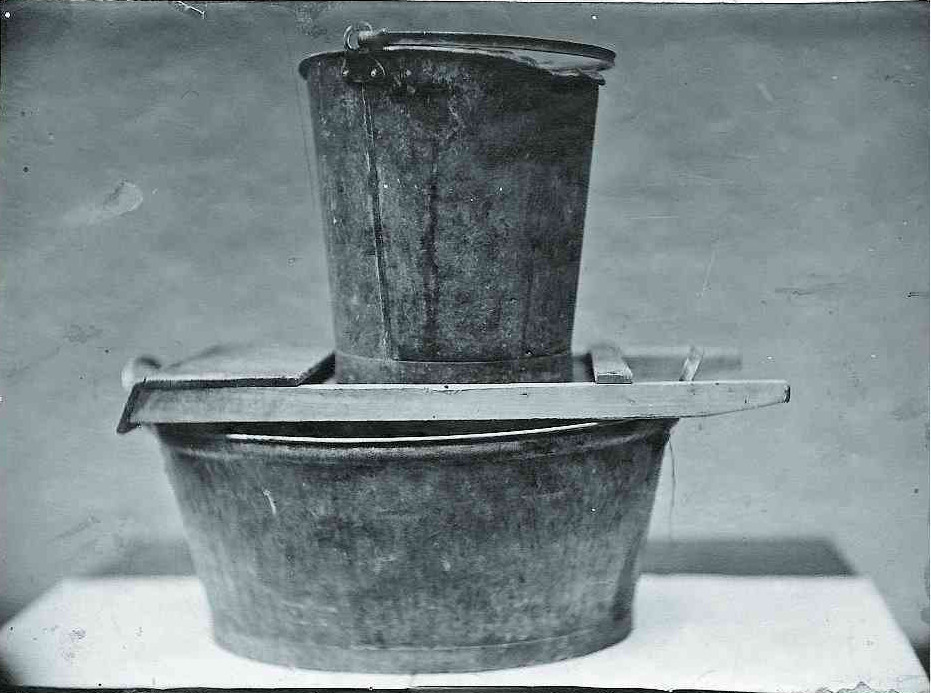
The washtub, washboard and coal scuttle that Nilsson used to drown the children

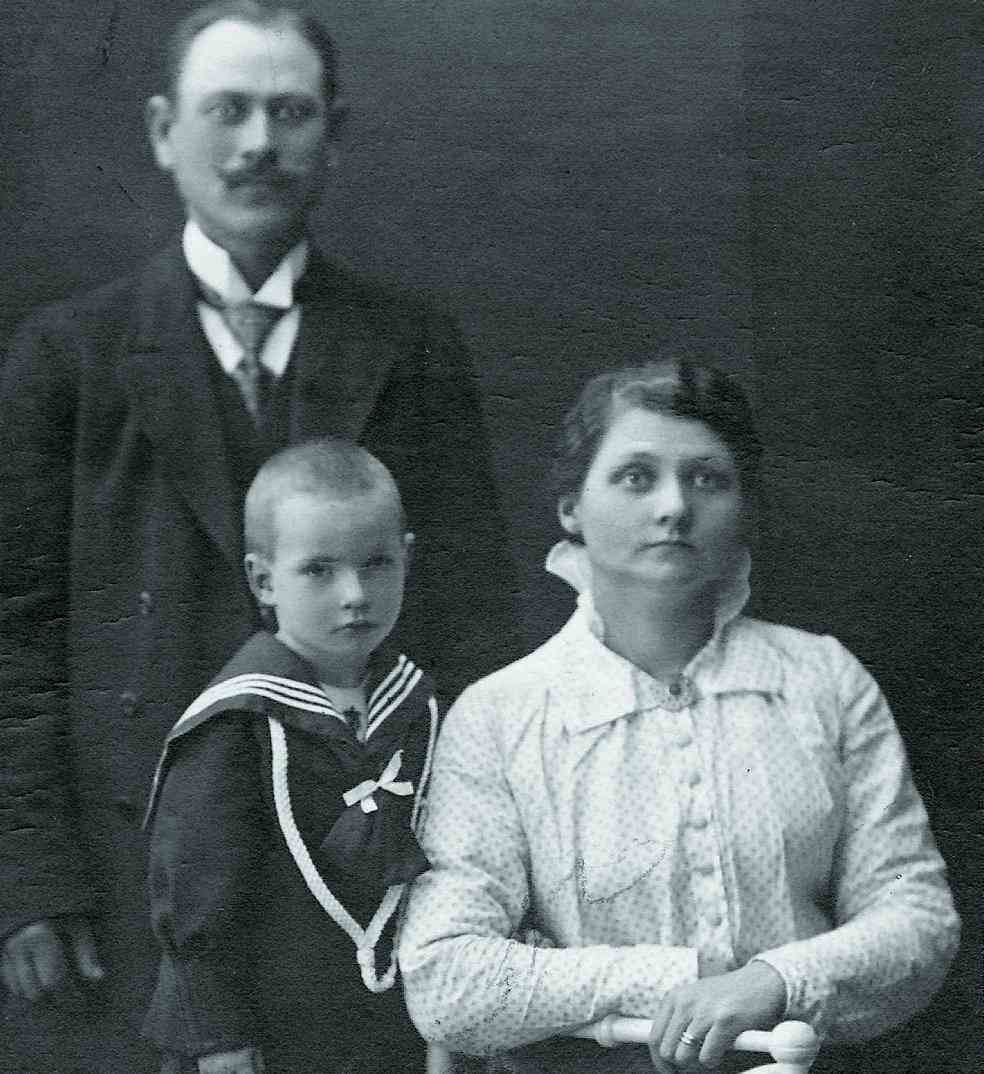
Nilsson with her husband Gustaf and foster son Erik Gustaf

Nilsson murdered the children she took care of shortly after their mothers left them in her care. This was possible because the authorities rarely knew of these babies' existence. Furthermore, the mothers almost never came back to learn how their children were doing.

One method Nilsson used for murdering the children was to put them into a washtub and then place heavy objects—such as a washboard and coal scuttle—on top of them. She then left the room and returned hours later when the children were dead. The next step in her procedure was to burn their bodies. On occasions when she did not burn them, she dug graves and buried them.

Nilsson was different from other baby-farmer child killers of that time, in that she actively killed the children. Most others simply left the children with insufficient food and unhealthy living conditions which led to their deaths.

== Discovery, trial and sentence ==
Nilsson's crimes were discovered when a woman named Blenda Henricsson wanted to contact her child. When Nilsson refused contact, Henricsson asked the police to investigate. The police soon found ample incriminating evidence of the murders.

Nilsson was sentenced to death by guillotine for eight murders. Before the punishment could be carried out, she died from suicide by hanging on 10 August 1917.

She was the last death penalty prisoner in Swedish history whose sentence was not commuted.

== See also ==
- List of serial killers by country
