= Jessie King =

Jessie King may refer to:

- Jessie King, basketball player for the Purefoods Tender Juicy Giants
- Jessie King (childtaker) (1861–1889), babyfarmer and last person hanged in Edinburgh, Scotland
- Jessie M. King (1875–1949), Scottish painter and illustrator
- Jessie King (writer) (1862–?), Scottish writer

== See also ==
- Jesse King (disambiguation)
- Jess King, American dancer and fitness instructor
