= Makin v Attorney General for New South Wales =

1893 Privy Council case

- Court: Judicial Committee of the Privy Council
- Full case name: (1) John Makin, and (2) Sarah Makin v Attorney General for New South Wales
- Decided: 22 July 1893 appeal dismissed; 12 December 1893 reasons published
- Citations: [1893] UKPC 56, [1894] AC 57

Case history
- Prior actions: R v Makin [1893] NSWLawRp 28, (1893) 14 LR (NSW) 1
- Appealed from: Supreme Court (Full Court)

Court membership
- Judges sitting: Lord Herschell LC, Lord Watson, Lord Halsbury, Lord Ashbourne, Lord Macnaghten, Lord Morris, Lord Shand

Case opinions
- Decision by: Lord Herschell LC

Keywords
- similar fact evidence

Makin v Attorney General for New South Wales is a significant 1893 decision of the Judicial Committee of the Privy Council which gave rise to the modern common law rule of similar fact evidence.

== Background ==
A husband and wife, John and Sarah Makin, were baby farmers. A one-month-old child died within 2 days after being given to them; they were charged with murdering the child and burying it in their backyard. During their trial, evidence of twelve other babies found buried in the backyards of their previous residences was offered. On 9 March 1893 both were convicted, and it was recommended that Sarah Makin be shown mercy. The trial judge stated a special case for the opinion of a Full Court of the Supreme Court of NSW, which heard the appeal on 23 March and handed down their decision on 30 March 1893, holding that the similar fact evidence was properly admitted. Immediately following the Full Court's decision, Stephen J sentenced both John and Sarah Makin to death by hanging. Sarah Makin's sentence was commuted to life imprisonment before the appeal to the Privy Council.

The appeal to the Privy Council was based on whether this evidence was admissible or whether it was unfairly prejudicial to their defence.

== Opinion of the Court ==
At the close of arguments on 22 July 1893 the Privy Council announced that its advice was that the appeal should be dismissed, and its reasons were published on 12 December 1893.

Lord Herschell held that the evidence, in this case, was admissible, however, as a general rule evidence of a past similar event should not be admissible unless there were exceptional circumstances.

It is undoubtedly not competent for the prosecution to adduce evidence tending to show that the accused has been guilty of criminal acts other than those covered by the indictment, for the purpose of leading to the conclusion that the accused is a person likely from his criminal conduct or character to have committed the offence for which he is being tried. On the other hand, the mere fact that the evidence adduced tends to show the commission of other crimes does not render it inadmissible if it be relevant to an issue before the jury, and it may be so relevant if it bears upon the question whether the acts alleged to constitute the crime charged in the indictment were designed or accidental, or to rebut a defence which would otherwise be open to the accused. The statement of these general principles is easy, but it is obvious that it may often be very difficult to draw the line and to decide whether a particular piece of evidence is on the one side or the other.

Evidence of similar facts can only be admitted both if it is relevant, and its probative value outweighs any prejudicial effect.

== Aftermath ==
A plea for clemency for John Makin, was denied and he was hanged at Darlinghurst Gaol on 15 August 1893.

== Extraterritoriality ==
The court also delivered an opinion that colonial legislatures did not have the power to pass laws with extraterritorial effect:

Their Lordships think it right to add that they are of the opinion that if the wider construction had been applied to the statute, and it was supposed that it was intended thereby to comprehend cases so wide as those insisted on at the bar, it would have been beyond the competence of the Colony to enact such a law. Their jurisdiction is confined within their own territories, and the maxim which has been more than once quoted, 'Extra territorium jus dicenti impune non paretur,' would be applicable to such a case.

The question was already uncertain prior to this, and as an obiter dictum the opinion was not binding; nevertheless it had a chilling effect on Dominion legislatures' willingness to pass extraterritorial laws until the Statute of Westminster 1931 explicitly stated that they had the power to do so.

== See also ==
- List of Judicial Committee of the Privy Council cases
- Sweitzer v. The Queen [1982] 1 S.C.R. 949 at 952
