= Coal scuttle =

Bucket for conveying coal to a stove or fireplace

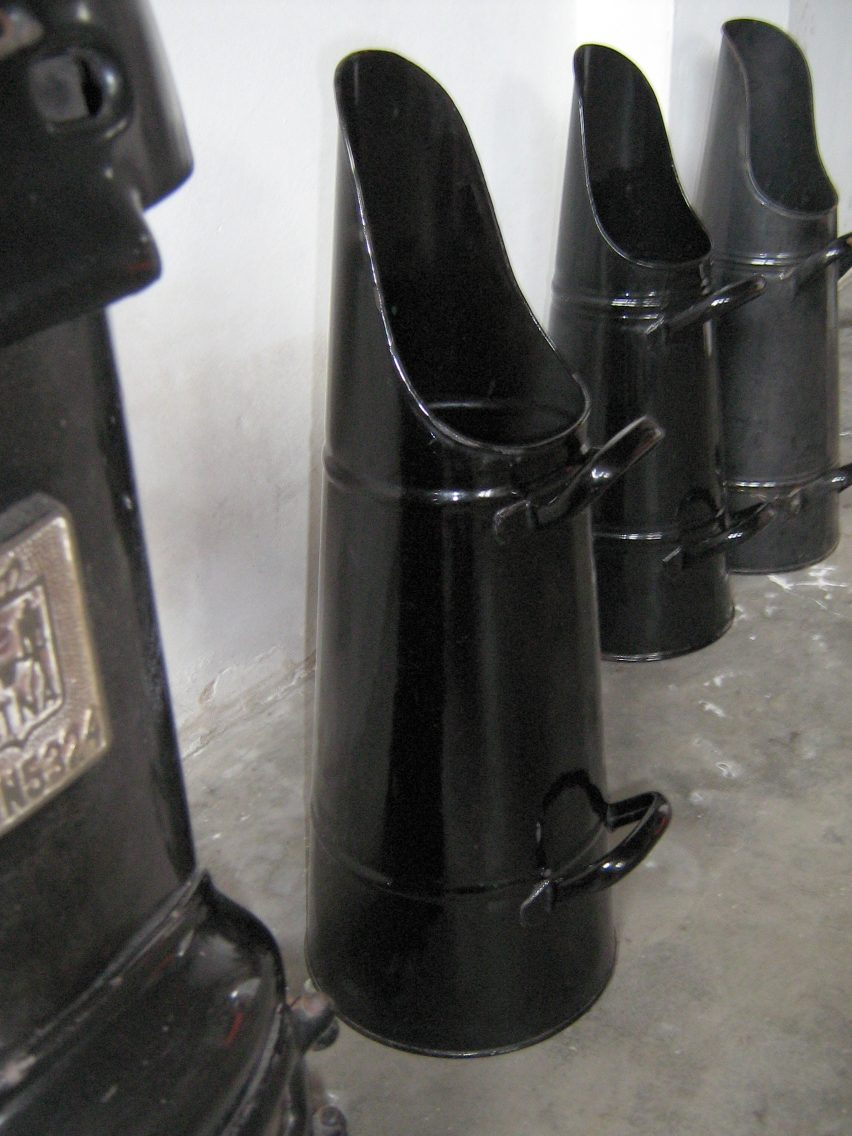
Assorted coal scuttles

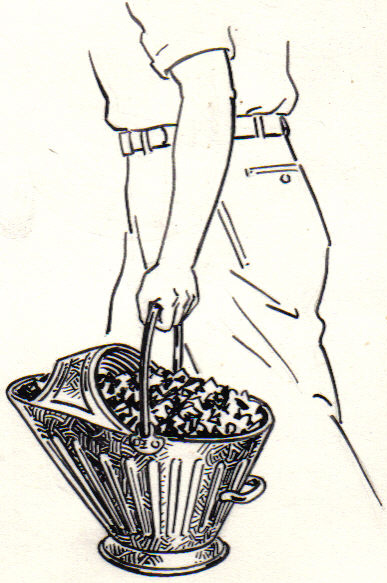
Drawing of a coal scuttle

A coal scuttle, sometimes spelled coalscuttle and also called a hod, "coal bucket", or "coal pail", is a bucket-like container for holding a small, intermediate supply of coal convenient to an indoor coal-fired stove or heater.

== Description ==
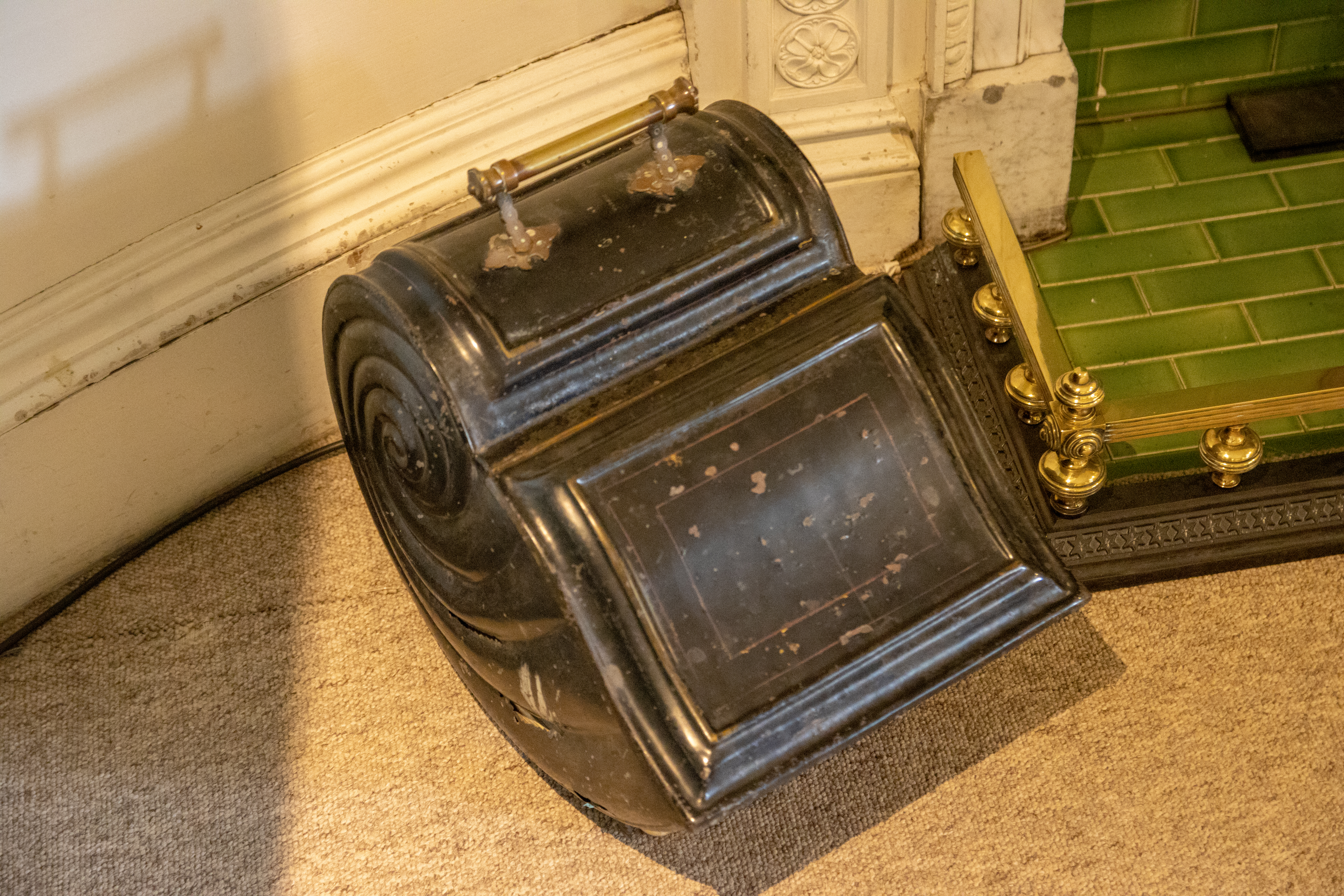
A coal scuttle at Berrington Hall

Coal scuttles are usually made of metal and shaped as a vertical cylinder or truncated cone, with the open top slanted for pouring coal on a fire. It may have one or two handles. Homes that do not use coal sometimes use a coal scuttle decoratively.

== Origin ==
The word scuttle comes, via Middle English and Old English, from the Latin word scutulla, meaning "serving platter". An alternative name, hod, derives from the Old French hotte, meaning "'basket to carry on the back', apparently from Frankish *hotta or some other Germanic source (compare Middle High German hotze 'cradle')", and is also used in reference to boxes used to carry bricks or other construction materials.

== Infamous use ==
In 1917, the Swedish serial killer Hilda Nilsson used a coal scuttle, a large bucket, and a washboard to drown children that she had been hired to care for.

The infamous German Stahlhelm, or Steel Helmet, is sometimes referred to in English-language publications as the "Coal Scuttle" helmet, due to its shape resembling that of a coal scuttle.
