= John and Sarah Makin =

Australian couple convicted of murder

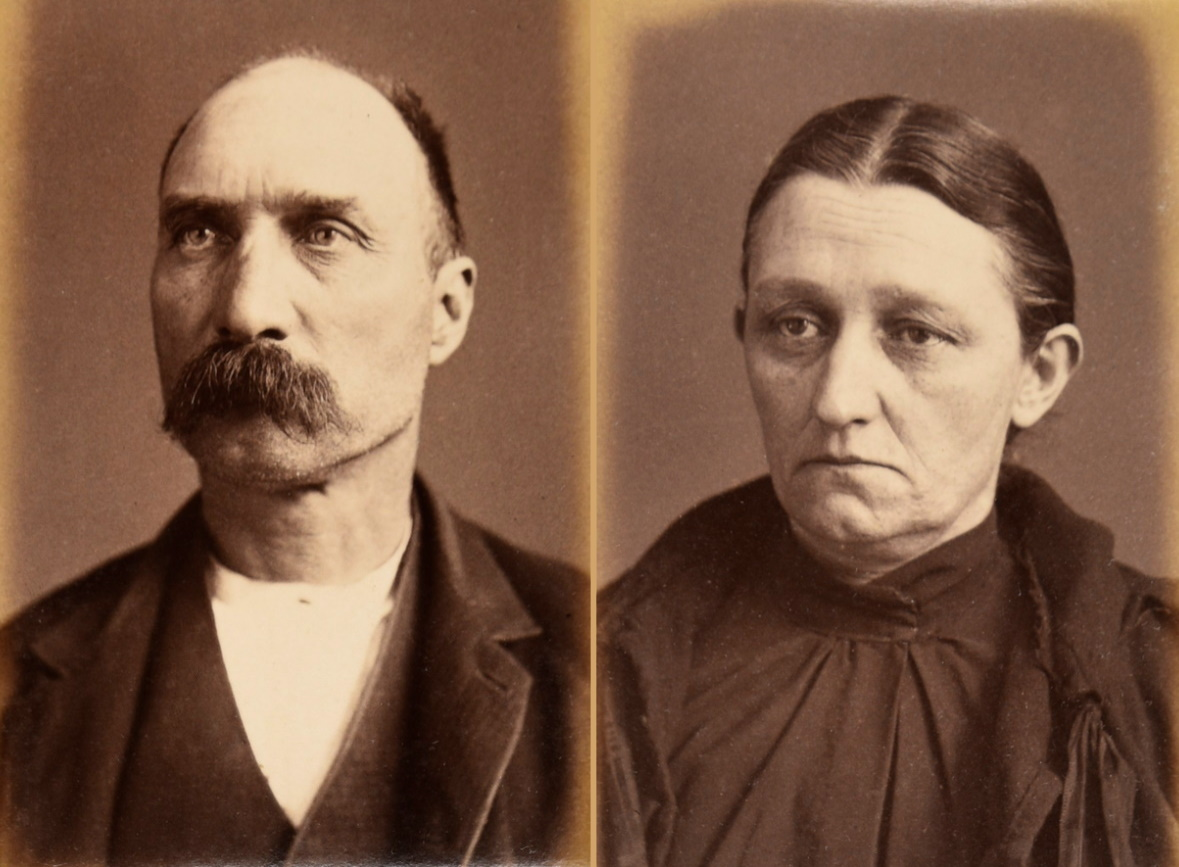
- John and Sarah Makin, prisoner photographs (December 1892)
- Born: John Sidney Makin; 14 February 1845; Dapto, Wollongong, New South Wales, Australia; Sarah Jane Makin; 20 December 1845; Sydney, New South Wales, Australia
- Died: John; 15 August 1893 (aged 48); Darlinghurst Gaol, New South Wales; Sarah; 13 September 1918 (aged 72); Sydney, New South Wales
- Cause of death: John; Execution by hanging
- Occupations: John; Drayman; Sarah; Midwife
- Known for: Baby farmers who murdered adopted infants
- Children: 5 sons, 5 daughters
- Parent(s): William Samuel and Ellen Selena Bolton Makin (John); Emanuel and Ellen Murphy Sutcliffe (Sarah)
- Conviction: Murder
- Penalty: John; Death; Sarah; Death; commuted to life imprisonment

Details
- Victims: 15 infant bodies found
- Span of crimes: November 1891 – June 1892 (roughly)
- Locations: Macdonaldtown (now Erskineville), Sydney 7 infant bodies found at Burren Street; Redfern, Sydney 1 infant body found at Zamia Street 4 infant bodies found at George Street 1 infant body found at Alderson Street; Chippendale, Sydney 2 infant bodies found at Levey Street
- Target: Infants
- Date apprehended: 1892
- Imprisoned at: John; Darlinghurst Gaol (prior to execution); Sarah; Darlinghurst Gaol, Bathurst Gaol & Long Bay Gaol

John Sidney Makin (14 February 1845 – 15 August 1893) and Sarah Jane Makin (20 December 1845 – 13 September 1918) were Australian 'baby farmers' who were convicted in New South Wales for the murder of infant Horace Murray. The couple answered a series of advertisements from unmarried mothers seeking adoption of their babies, taking on the care of the infants on payment of a "premium". The remains of fifteen infants were found by police buried in the yards of houses where the Makins had resided. The exact cause of death was not determined but, due to the bloodstains on the infants' clothing, it is believed they had been stabbed in the heart with a large needle, hence the name "Hatpin Murders".

The couple were tried and found guilty in March 1893 and both were sentenced to death, though Sarah Makin's sentence was commuted to life imprisonment. After an unsuccessful appeal, which was confirmed by the Privy Council in Britain, John Makin was hanged on 15 August 1893. Sarah Makin served her sentence at Bathurst and Sydney. After eighteen and a half years, she was released in April 1911 when her daughters petitioned for her early release.

== Background ==
John Sidney Makin was born on 14 February 1845 at Dapto, near Wollongong, the son of an assigned convict, William Makin, and his wife Ellen (née Bolton). John was the fourth of eleven children born between 1838 and 1860.

Sarah Jane Sutcliffe was born on 20 December 1845 in Sussex Street, Sydney, the daughter of Emanuel Sutcliffe and Ellen (née Murphy). Her father was a miller and former convict. Sarah's first marriage was to a mariner, Charles Edwards, on 29 April 1865 in Sydney. She later married brewery drayman John Makin of Dapto, New South Wales, on 27 August 1871. John and Sarah Makin had at least ten children, five sons and five daughters.

In about 1881, John Makin was working as a drayman for a brewer. In November 1881 he was convicted of stealing and sentenced to three months' imprisonment. In 1885 Makin was employed as a driver of a green-grocer's van. In May 1886 a four-year-old child was knocked down by Makin's van while crossing Elizabeth Street. The child suffered concussion and was reported to be in "a precarious condition".

After John Makin was injured in an accident, as a source of income the couple turned to 'baby farming', the practice of taking on the care of illegitimate babies in exchange for payment. Makin was described as "by no means an industrious man," who in three of the four years prior to November 1892 had "not done much work." Makin's last-known employment was for Mr. R. Bedford of Great Buckingham Street, Redfern, a livery-stable proprietor and mail contractor. Bedford employed him as a driver in November 1891, "but the man never appeared to have much heart in his work", leaving suddenly after about six weeks. During the first few months of 1892, while living at Levey Street in Chippendale, he did no work and "was usually to be seen idling about in front of the house". Neighbours of the Makin family, at the many houses they had occupied, were in general agreement that John Makin "was fond of boasting that he was a person possessed of some private means". It was reported he was in receipt of one pound a week from a Wollongong property inherited from his mother, who had died in 1890. In spite of this the family "always seemed to be miserably poor".

By October 1892, when news broke about the discovery of the bodies of two infants buried in the yard of the house in Macdonaldtown, the Makin family were living at 6 Wells Street in Redfern. The household at this time was made up of John and Sarah Makin, their two-year-old son Cecil (known as 'Tommy'), and daughters, Blanche and Florence (aged 18 and 17). Two of their sons, William (aged 20) and Percy (aged 12), had been living in Wollongong "for some time past". Clarice, aged 16, was not living with the family; she had left the household to work as a domestic servant in early July 1892. Sarah Makin's daughter from her first marriage, Minnie, was married and had had "a quarrel with the Makins some time ago". Another daughter, Daisy, aged 11 years, also lived apart from the family.

== Baby farming ==
Some of the Makins' baby-farming activities came to light at the inquests held in the Coroner's Court and subsequent trial on a murder charge:

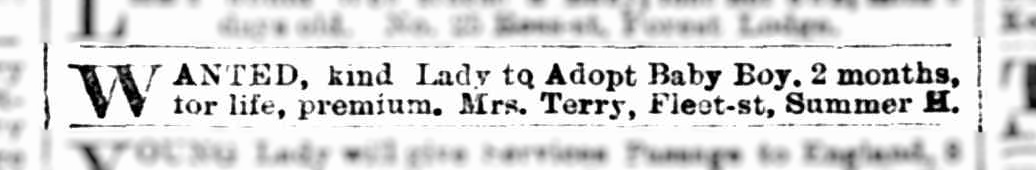
The advertisement placed by Agnes Ward in the Evening News, 27 April 1892

=== Charles Ward (infant son of Agnes Ward) ===
On 12 February 1892 nineteen-year-old Miss Agnes Ward, a domestic servant living at Cook's River, gave birth to a male child at the residence of Mrs. Elizabeth Terry, a midwife, at Fleet Street, Summer Hill. The birth was registered at Ashfield, with the child named Charles Ward. On 27 April Ward inserted an advertisement in the Evening News for a "kind lady" to adopt her baby boy. The next day John and Sarah Makin and their daughter Daisy met with Ward at Mrs. Terry's residence. They agreed to adopt the infant for £5, and "promised to be very kind to it". John Makin claimed he was taking the child "to fill the gap" caused by the death of his own child named 'Johnny' and this child "would take the dead child's place". He said they were living in Kettle Street in Redfern, but were shortly to move "to take a 'piggery'". He promised to send their new address, so Agnes might have an opportunity of seeing the infant. The body marked 'C' found buried at 109 George Street, Redfern was provisionally determined to be Agnes Ward's male child.

=== Infant daughter of Clara Risby ===
Clara Risby, a domestic servant residing at Woolloomooloo, gave birth to a baby girl on 15 April 1892 at the Benevolent Asylum. On 4 May she placed an advertisement in the Evening News seeking a "kind person" to adopt a "baby girl for life", offering a 'premium' of £5. A letter was sent from the Makins (using the surname 'McLachlan'), then living at 16 East Street, Redfern. Risby and her married step-sister, Mary Sargent, took the baby to the Makins' house on 16 May, where the baby was handed over. Sarah Makin said she would look after the child "and 'fetch' it up as one of her own". John Makin told them he had money left to him and they were going to take a poultry farm at Rockdale; Mary Sargent left her address with Makin, who promised to let her know their new address. Clara Risby visited and saw the child on 18 May. On a subsequent visit she was told that "Mrs. McLachlan was out with the child". When she next visited, on 24 May, she found the house empty.

=== Infant daughter of Mary Stacey ===
Miss Mary Stacey, a domestic servant residing at Petersham, gave birth to a baby girl on 17 April 1892. On 17 June she advertised for some person to adopt her child, and received a letter from the Makins (using the surname 'Ray') offering to take charge of the child for a payment (or "premium") of £3. Stacey visited the family at 109 George Street, Redfern where "all the Makins professed to take a great fancy to the baby, and kissed it affectionately". Sarah Makin consented to adopt the baby on payment of £2. Mary Stacey handed her infant over to Blanche and Clarice Makin when they visited her Petersham residence on 23 June. A few days later John Makin and Blanche called at her place with the child, and told her the family was going to live at Hurstville. Later Stacey visited 109 George Street, Redfern, which was empty, and then spent two days searching Hurstville for the family, but without success. She then informed the police that the 'Ray' family "had disappeared with the child".

=== Elsie Todd (infant daughter of Agnes Todd) ===
Agnes Todd, a domestic servant, gave birth to a baby girl in about December 1891, which she named Elsie. From about March 1892 the child was cared for by Maria Sutherland, a married woman living in Alexandria. In June 1892 Agnes Todd paid John Makin £3 for him to take the child, whom he collected from Mrs. Sutherland on 28 June while the Makins were living at 109 George Street, Redfern (the day before they moved to Macdonaldtown). Makin told the child's mother "he would be a good father to the child".

=== Horace Murray (infant son of Amber Murray) ===
On 30 May 1892 eighteen-year-old Miss Amber Murray gave birth to a baby boy she named Horace Amber Murray. On 24 June she placed an advertisement in the Sydney Morning Herald in search of a "motherly person" to adopt her baby boy, offering to pay "a small premium". On the day the advertisement appeared a letter was written by either John or Sarah Makin from 109 George Street, Redfern, expressing a willingness to adopt the child for a fee of about £2 10s or £3 and give him "a mother's love and attention". The letter, signed 'E. Hill', invited the advertiser to call at the address given if the proposal suited. When the Makins saw the child they told Miss Murray he was the kind they would like to have, "as they had lost a little boy of their own". Soon afterwards Amber Murray took the child to the Redfern address to hand him over, together with the payment of £3 and papers concerning the adoption of the child. Makin at first said he did not understand the papers, but then read through and signed them (first signed as 'John Leslie', which he then scratched out and signed his name as 'Hill'). As Miss Murray was leaving the child was brought out to see her, which was the last time she saw her son. Within a day or two the Makins had relocated to Burren Street in Macdonaldtown.

=== Mignonette Bothamley (infant daughter of Minnie Davis and Horace Bothamley) ===
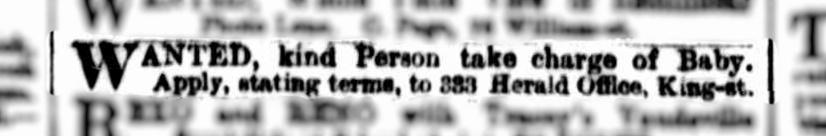
The advertisement placed by Minnie Davis in the Sydney Morning Herald, 21 June 1892

On 10 June 1892 Miss Mignonette ('Minnie') Davis, a domestic servant living in Paddington, gave birth to a baby girl. The child was named Mignonette (after her mother); the birth was registered in Newtown with the father's details included. Minnie Davis placed an advertisement in the Sydney Morning Herald on 21 June for a "kind person" to adopt her child. John Makin, using the surname 'Bert', answered the advertisement. Davis and the child's father, Horace Bothamley, went to the Makins' house at 109 George Street, Redfern the following day, where Makin agreed to take the baby for ten shillings a week, and told the parents they could see the baby whenever they liked. They then left the baby, with some infant's clothing, with the family. Two days later Miss Davis returned to see the child and took some more clothing. Sarah Makin was present on that occasion. When Davis and Bothamley next visited, the family had moved to Burren Street in Macdonaldtown. Bothamley found out their new address and he and Davis went there a week later, where they saw the child and paid ten shillings. The couple began to visit every Saturday to see the baby and pay the weekly stipend to the Makins. During one of the visits Davis and Bothamley discovered the Makins' real surname when they saw a printed card reading "Mrs. Makin, ladies' nurse and qualified midwife" (after which Sarah Makin admitted to deceiving them). On 23 July they were informed the infant had a cold. On the following Saturday the child "was very ill" and Makin told them he would take her to the doctor on Monday. A few days later Makin sent Bothamley a telegram to say the child had died.

On Thursday, 4 August, Davis and Bothamley arrived at the Macdonaldtown residence with a bunch of flowers to view the baby's body. The deceased child was laid out on a board, "enshrouded in a long white gown". John Makin said to Davis: "Perhaps it's better that it did die". On being asked the cause of death, Makin replied: "It wasted away. I will have no bother in getting a certificate from the doctor". He claimed a coffin had been ordered and he would bury the infant for two pounds.

== Discovery of bodies ==
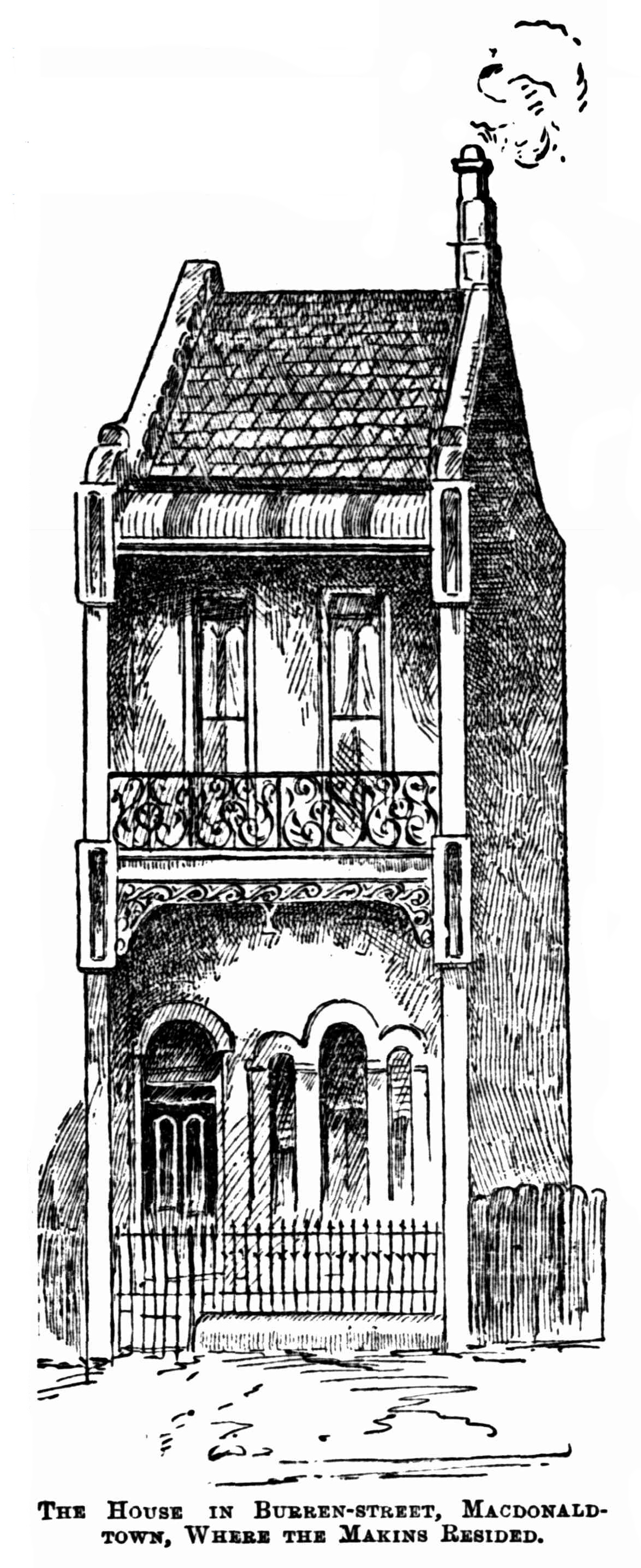
The house in Burren Street, Macdonaldtown, where the Makins resided (from the Illustrated Sydney News, 12 November 1892)

=== Two infants' bodies found ===
On Tuesday, 11 October 1892, two men named James Mahoney and Frank Cooney were digging a trench in the backyard of 25 Burren Street, Macdonaldtown, in order to connect a service pipe from the house to the sewer, when Mahoney found "very much decomposed" remains buried under six inches of earth, that he thought was a cat. The following morning, Mahoney found the body of a female infant buried under about a foot of earth, about 30 yards (27 m) from the remains he had found the day before, which the men now concluded was also the body of an infant. The bodies were described as being "very much decomposed, and had evidently been interred some months". The Newtown police were informed and the bodies were removed to the South Sydney Morgue. The preliminary inquest at the morgue disclosed the remains to be a male and a female infant. Both had been buried with clothing on, and it was initially estimated the female had been buried for about six weeks and the male about three months. It was revealed that the tenants of the house in Burren Street at the time of the discoveries had only occupied the house during the previous three weeks.

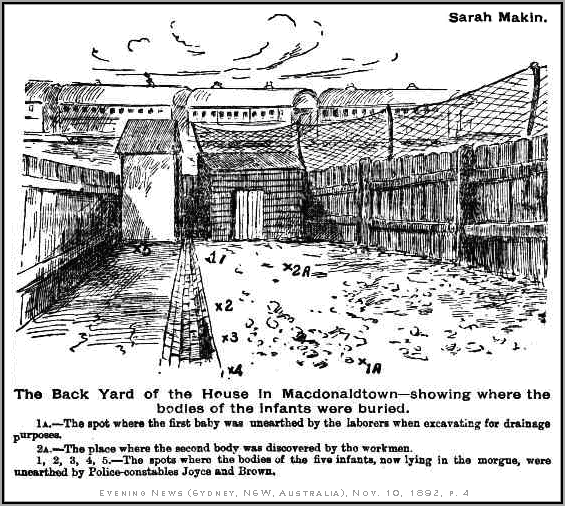
The yard of the house in Burren street Macdonaldtown where the Makins resided and where 7 bodies were found (from the Illustrated Sydney News, 12 November 1892)

On 14 October 1892, a few days after the discovery of the bodies in Macdonaldtown, the body of a decomposed male infant, estimated to be about 20 days old, was found in a vacant allotment in Zamia Street in Redfern. Senior-constable Joyce, on looking about the yard at Wells Street (where the Makins were living), "noticed some recently disturbed earth". When Joyce dug at the spot it was found to be empty, and the conclusion reached was that the body found in Zamia Street had been recently disinterred at the Wells Street house and relocated. The body was too decomposed to ascertain the cause of death, or even whether the child was born alive, and the inquest returned "an open verdict of found dead".

The inquest was transferred to the Coroner's Court, Chancery Square, and resumed on 26 October 1892 before the coroner and a jury. Evidence was given by the two workmen who had discovered the bodies, the doctors who had carried out autopsies and the Government analyst, as well as Senior-constable Joyce and several of the neighbours. The medical evidence determined that the female infant had been stillborn and the male baby was aged from five to eight months and had been dead from between three and six months. On the final day of the inquest, 28 October, the Makins' daughters, Blanche (aged 17) and Florence (aged 14), testified, as well as John and Sarah Makin. Sarah Makin claimed, on the day after moving into the Macdonaldtown house in late June 1892, she 'took in' a female child, about two weeks old, to wet nurse, being paid ten shillings a week. She asserted that in mid-August "the mother took it away and said she was going to Melbourne". Makin also claimed that this child "was the first and only one" she had taken in. John Makin "corroborated the testimony of his wife in every particular". In summing up, the City Coroner, John Woore, told the jury this was a case "surrounded by suspicion, and there was no doubt that the bodies had been placed there secretly". After a few minutes deliberation the jury returned an open verdict, to the effect that the evidence did not enable a determination of how the infants had died.

The Makin family had lived at 25 Burren Street in Macdonaldtown from 29 June 1892 to 16 August 1892, during which time Sarah Makin advertised her services as a midwife (which she denied at the inquest). After that they moved to 6 Wells Street, Redfern, where they were visited by Senior-constable Joyce on 12 October after the discovery of the bodies. The family soon afterwards removed to a house in Chippen Street in Chippendale.

=== Five additional bodies ===
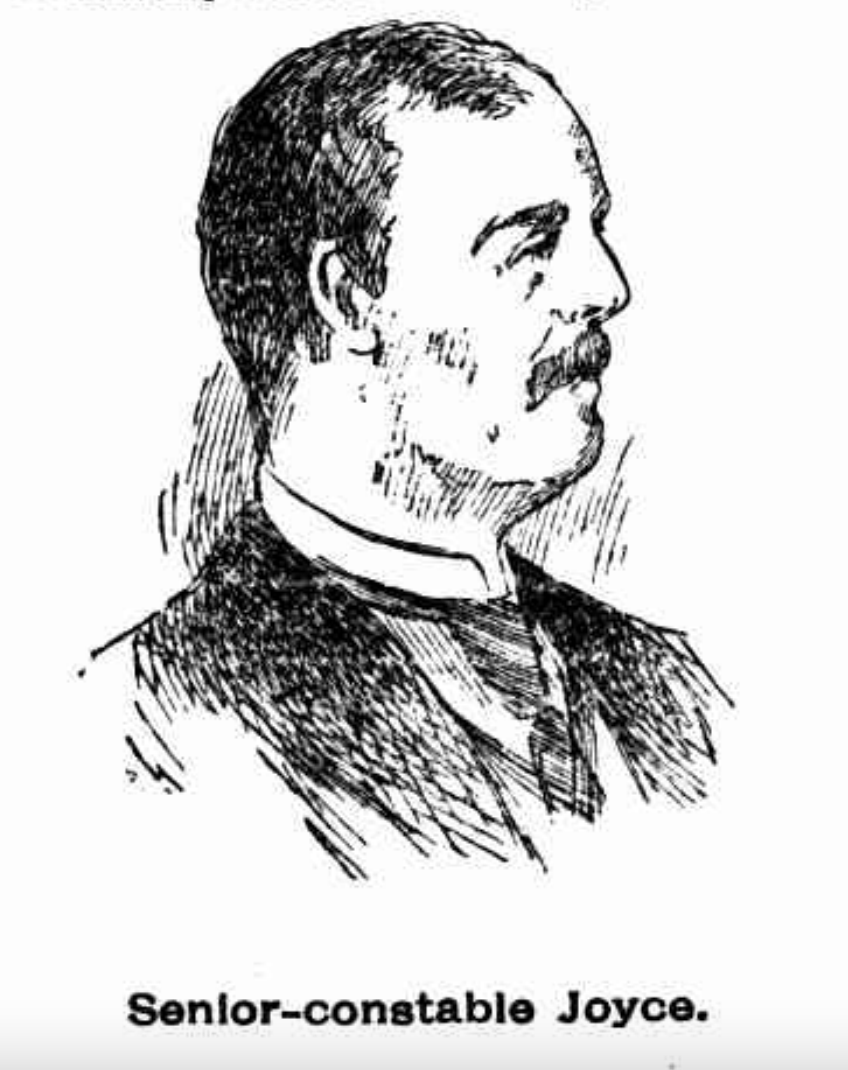
Senior Constable James Joyce was instrumental in the hunt for the bodies (Illustrated Sydney News, 12 November 1892)

On 2 November Senior-constable James Joyce and Constable Alexander Brown, plain-clothes officers of the Newtown Police Station, went to the house in Burren Street and commenced digging in the yard, where they found an additional five babies' bodies. On the afternoon of 3 November 1892 Joyce arrested John Makin and his daughters, Blanche and Florence, at their house at Chippendale and took them to Newtown Police Station. Sarah Makin was already at the station, having been previously arrested at Parramatta. During questioning Blanche disclosed that she recollected that her mother "had three infants to care for at one time". When asked why she had stated at the inquest that her mother had only looked after one child, Blanche said her parents "had told her to say she knew nothing about any other children having been in the house". John and Sarah Makin were charged "on suspicion, with causing the death of an illegitimate female child, the offspring of Horace Bothamley and Minnie Davis, on or about the end of July or the beginning of August last". Blanche and Florence Makin were also charged, "on suspicion, of being concerned in the death of the child in question". The Makins' youngest child, two-year-old Cecil, was taken under the care of a neighbour.

The police announced their intention to investigate the yards of the houses the family had occupied during the past three or four years, as this was the period Senior-constable Joyce was of the opinion the Makins had been "engaged in baby farming". By mid-November yards in Botany, East and Kettle streets had been searched, where no discoveries were made, with searches to be carried out in Bullanaming Street, St. Peters, and Howard Street.

=== The body-count ===
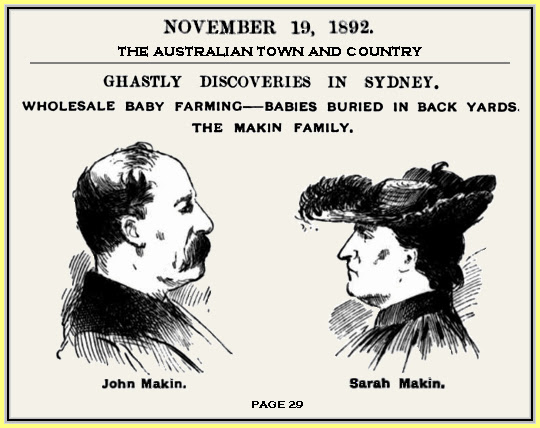
From The Australian Town and Country, 19 November 1892

Between 12 October and 12 November the remains of fifteen infants were found by police buried on premises where the Makins had resided. Inquests were held and in several cases open verdicts were recorded.

- 25 Burren Street, Macdonaldtown, occupied by the Makin family from 29 June to 16 August 1892 — the bodies of seven infants were recovered from the yard (two on 11 and 12 October 1892 and a further five in early November 1892): (No. 1) male infant, aged from five to eight months; buried from three to six months; (No. 2) female infant, stillborn; (No. 3) male infant, aged from two to three months, buried from four to six months (open verdict); (No. 4) determined by the inquest jury to be the female child of Minnie Davis and Horace Bothamley; (No. 5) female infant, estimated to be about 10 days old, buried for about three months (open verdict); At the inquest into the bodies found at Burren Street at the Coroner's Court on 16 December 1892, Clarice Makin gave evidence that the family's relocation from George Street, Redfern to Burren Street, Macdonaldtown was carried out between seven and eight o'clock at night and they took with them six babies, two in a cradle, two in a perambulator, one carried by her mother and another carried by Daisy. At the trial of her parents on 6 March 1893 Clarice claimed to have no recollection of saying she saw six babies being taken to Burren Street when the family moved there.
- Zamia Street, Redfern (vacant allotment), one body found on 14 October 1892; "supposed to have been disinterred from the back yard of the Makins' house in Wells Street on their learning of the discovery in Macdonaldtown".
- 109 George Street, Redfern, four infants' bodies found on 9 November 1892 (designated 'A', 'B', 'C' and 'D'). The body marked 'D' was subsequently identified as Horace Amber Murray, for whose murder the Makins were later charged. The Makins rented 109 George Street, Redfern (using the surname 'Mason') for just over one month, from 21 May until 27 June 1892.
- 11 Alderson Street, Redfern, one infant body found in the yard on 11 November 1892 (designated 'E'); buried at a depth of two feet, wrapped in black cloth; estimated age at death: two to six weeks; estimated period since burial: "from six to 12 months"; gender: "impossible to ascertain"; the house was rented by John Makin from 7 December 1891 to 28 January 1892; coronial inquiry held on 14 December 1892, open verdict arrived at ("no evidence as to the cause of death").
- 28 Levey Street, Chippendale (next door to the Appin Hotel), the remains of two infants found by the police on 12 November 1892, in the yard "near the kitchen wall"; buried together ("little remained but the bones"); occupied by the Makins in about November 1891 for about six or seven weeks.

As a result of the examinations by the City Coroner the Makins were charged with causing the death of the illegitimate male child of Amber Murray, on or about 27 June 1892, and committed for trial at the Central Criminal Court. They were also charged with causing the death of the illegitimate female child of Horace Bothamley and Minnie Davis about the end of July or the beginning of August 1892. John and Sarah Makin were found guilty of manslaughter by the Coroner's Court and committed for trial at the Central Criminal Court.

== Trial ==
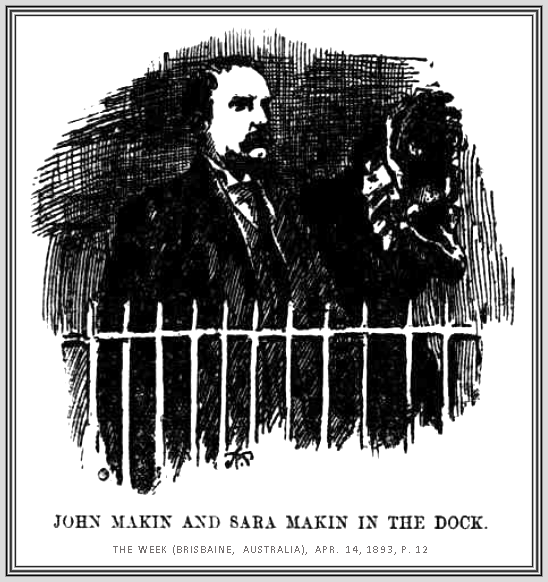
John & Sarah Makin in the dock with Sarah's face covered with a handkerchief (from The Week, Brisbane, 14 April 1893)

John and Sarah Makin were put on trial in the Central Criminal Court, beginning on Monday, 6 March 1893, before Justice Stephen. They were charged with having, on 29 June 1892 at Redfern, "feloniously and maliciously" murdered Horace Amber Murray. They were also charged with having murdered "a certain male infant whose name is unknown" on the same day and at the same place. The second count referred to the same child, and was in place in the event of the first charge failing due to a technicality associated with the child's identity. The Makins pleaded not guilty to the charges and were defended by Thomas Williamson. John Makin crossed his legs and arms sitting in the dock during the Crown Prosecutor's address and the witnesses' evidence. Sarah Makin hid her face with a handkerchief throughout the day.

Witnesses included Amber Murray who detailed the sequence of events leading to her handing over her infant son to the Makins. She identified the clothes found on the remains of the child found under the window of 109 George Street, Redfern, as those that her son was wearing when he was handed over. The gown was one she had made for the child, and the shirt was identified as one given to her for the baby.

At the trial it was not established how the babies died, many of the bodies were too decomposed by the time they were discovered but Constable James Joyce gave evidence of finding bloodstains on the infant's clothing, just under the armpits and believed the infants had been stabbed in the heart with a hatpin.

On the second day of the trial, one of those who gave evidence was Edward Jordan, a horse-trainer, who was locked up in the Newtown police station with John Makin. During the confinement he claimed Makin had told him that seven babies had been found, but there was an eighth not yet discovered. Makin added that when the eighth was found, "he would never see daylight any more—that was what a man got for obliging people". Jordan also claimed Makin had told him, "no doctor could prove that he had poisoned any of the children, because he never went near a chemist".

The Crown's case, conducted by the prosecutor Patrick Healy, was completed early on 8 March, the third day of the trial. For the defence the prisoners made no statement, nor did they call any evidence. Williamson, the Makins' solicitor, then proceeded to address the jury. He claimed that the Crown had failed to prove a murder had been committed, that the cause of death had not been given in regard to any of the infants referred to in the evidence, and as such it was "an insult to their intelligence" that the jury members should be asked to think that because certain children had been found dead, that the child whose death was the subject of the trial had been murdered. Healy, the Crown Prosecutor, admitted that "the case was a very extraordinary and a unique one" but he considered that the jury "would have no difficulty" in concluding that the child had been murdered. The jury retired at five in the afternoon to consider their verdict. After discussions between the jury foreman and the judge just after nine o'clock, it was determined that the jury was unlikely to reach a verdict that night, after which the jury was locked up for the night.

When the jury returned to the court at 10 a.m. the next day, 9 March, the foreman stated they had agreed to a verdict, guilty of the murder of Horace Murray in respect of both prisoners. The foreman added that they strongly recommended mercy for Sarah Makin. Justice Stephens said he would defer passing sentence pending a determination by the Full Court of the Supreme Court on points regarding the admissibility of certain evidence at the trial, that had been raised by Williamson, solicitor for the accused.

== Legal manoeuvres ==
=== The appeal ===
The appeal against the conviction of John and Sarah Makin was heard on Thursday, 23 March, before the Full Bench of the Supreme Court consisting of Justice Windeyer, Justice Innes and Justice Foster. The Queen's Counsel, Sir Julian Salomons, led in support of the appeal, with Francis Rogers, Q.C., heading the team in support of the conviction. The grounds for the appeal were: (1) that Justice Stephen was wrong in admitting evidence of the finding of other bodies other than the child's body alleged to be Horace Murray; (2) that the judge was wrong in admitting the evidence of the mothers (apart from Amber Murray) who had given up their children to the Makins; (3) that there was no evidence to prove the body marked 'D' was that of Horace Murray; (4) that there was no evidence of the death or cause of death of Horace Murray, or that he had been murdered. After hearing the arguments the Full Bench advised that they would consider their decision.

The appeal judges took a week to consider their decision. It was finally delivered in the Supreme Court on 30 March, dismissing the appeal and confirming the convictions. The main judgment, 27 pages in length, was written by Justice Windeyer and agreed to by Justice Foster. Justice Innes dissented to the extent that he disagreed with Windeyer's reasoning for admitting the evidence of the deaths of the other babies. Nevertheless, Innes concurred with his fellow judges that the convictions against the Makins should stand.

=== Sentencing ===
On the same day of the appeal dismissal, John and Sarah Makin appeared in the Central Criminal Court for sentencing by Justice Stephen. John Makin stood up in the dock "in that semi-defiant attitude which he maintained to the last". Sarah Makin was assisted to her place and hid her face in a handkerchief the whole time she was in court. The Makins' solicitor intimated prior to sentencing that they planned to appeal to the British Privy Council. As he passed sentence upon the prisoners Justice Stephens recounted how they had taken money from the mother of Horace Murray and "beguiled her with promises which you never meant to perform, having already determined on the death of the child; you misled her by false statements as to your name; you deceived her as to your address". Comparing the burial of the child in their yard "as you would the carcase of a dog", Justice Stephen declared that the Makins were "engaged in baby-farming in its worst phase and its most hideous and revolting aspect", that the "ghastly evidence" from the yards in which they lived "testified… that you were carrying on this nefarious and hellish trade, destroying the lives of those infants for the sake of gain". At the conclusion of his address the judge sentenced both prisoners to execution by hanging. In the case of Sarah Makin he added that he would forward the recommendation of mercy to the Executive. Towards the end of the sentencing Sarah Makin collapsed and had to be carried from the court by two constables, crying out "Oh! my babies; oh! my babies".

=== Appeal to the Privy Council ===
In order to appeal to the Privy Council in Britain, the consent of the New South Wales Government was required. A petition seeking consent was sent to the Executive Council on 11 April 1893. On the same day the Council commuted Sarah Makin's sentence of death to life imprisonment. On 21 April the Council delayed John Makin's execution for three months to allow for the appeal to the Privy Council.

When the Makins' petition was received in London the seven Law Lords of the Judicial Committee of the Privy Council reviewed the case. Their verdict was sent by cable to the New South Wales Government on 21 July, informing that the appeal was dismissed, but advising that the Judges had reserved their reasons for dismissal of the appeal until the following November. The notification of the Privy Council's dismissal of the appeal allowed the New South Wales Attorney-General to resume the judicial process and fix the date of John Makin's execution.

=== A plea for clemency ===
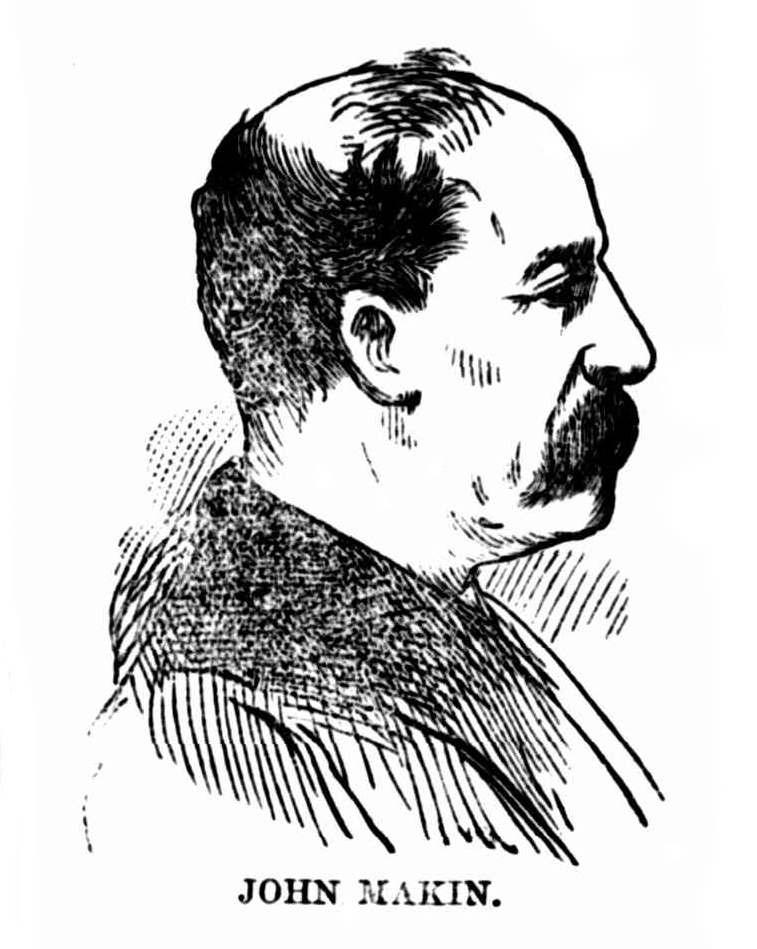
John Makin (from the Newcastle Morning Herald, 16 August 1893)

In early August 1893, Makin wrote to the Premier, Sir Henry Parkes, drawing attention to what he considered to be the weak points in the evidence and asking for a reprieve of the death sentence. The communication was forwarded to the Minister for Justice who determined that there was nothing in the letter likely to induce the Government to dispute the sentence. Nevertheless, Parkes consented to a deputation from Makin's family in Wollongong. On 11 August two of Makin's brothers, his sister-in-law and Archibald Campbell and John Nicholson, the members of parliament for Illawarra, met with the Colonial Secretary, Sir George Dibbs. They presented a petition "signed by a number of citizens of Wollongong". The Makin family deputation made no attempt to "go into the merits of the case", but "simply asked that, for the sake of his brothers and their families, and his own family, that… his punishment should be made the same as that inflicted on his wife". In the meeting the Makin family and their representatives argued that Makin had been "led to whatever he did by his wife", who was "the arch-aggressor, the arch-fiend in the matter". Sarah Makin was portrayed as "a terrible woman" who was "known to have a temper more like a fiend than a woman". Dibbs reminded the family that, unless further facts pertinent to the case were bought forward, the Government had no power to intervene in the legal process. He did, however, promise to call a meeting of the Executive Council on the following Monday to discuss the matter. The Executive Council, as expected, was unconvinced by the petition to save Makin's life and decided "the law should take its course".

== The Makins' fates ==
=== Execution of John Makin ===
John Makin was executed by hanging just after 9 a.m. on Tuesday, 15 August 1893, on the gallows within the precincts of Darlinghurst Gaol. It was reported that the condemned man "appeared resigned to his fate", having placed little hope upon the appeals for a reprieve. Makin had met with his wife on the previous Thursday, prior to her being taken to Bathurst Gaol. On the same day he was visited by his daughters Blanche and Florence, his brothers Daniel and Joseph, and his step-daughter Minnie Helbi. Makin left two written statements, one denying his guilt and the other addressed to his children (which was "couched in very affectionate terms"). The official report stated that the execution "was properly conducted".

=== Sarah Makin, prison and release ===
On 10 August 1893, five days prior to her husband's execution, Sarah Makin was transferred from Darlinghurst Gaol to Bathurst Gaol. In May 1895 she was transferred back to Darlinghurst Gaol and then returned to Bathurst in November 1898. During her second stint at Bathurst she was given a job of hospital attendant at the gaol. Makin's health deteriorated during her incarceration, occasionally suffering from intestinal haemorrhages. By 1907 two of Sarah's daughters, Florence (by then a married woman with the surname Anderson) and Minnie Helbi, had sufficient concerns about their mother's health that they each wrote to the Attorney-General requesting her release from prison. Ultimately, however, the daughters' pleas were refused.

In August 1909, Sarah Makin was transferred to the newly constructed State Reformatory for Women at Long Bay Gaol. In 1911, with a new Attorney-General in office, Makin and her family began another campaign for her release "so that she can spend her last days with her family". On this occasion the government, after considering her "advanced age and declining health", recommended her release. Sarah Makin was discharged "quietly and anonymously" from Long Bay Gaol on 29 April 1911, into the care of Florence Anderson and her husband.

A few months after her release Sarah moved to Belgrave Street in Petersham to live with her eldest daughter, Minnie Helby (formerly spelled as Helbi), who was suffering from bowel cancer and died in February 1912. Makin remained in the house at Petersham with her son-in-law, Carl Helby. As her health began to deteriorate, Florence and her husband moved in. Sarah Makin died on 13 September 1918, aged 72 years, from senile decay and heart failure (possibly due to tertiary syphilis). She was buried in Rookwood Cemetery.

== Legal implications ==
The Children's Protection Act had been enacted in New South Wales on 31 March 1892, prior to the discovery of the Makins' baby-farming activities. The legislation was an effort to regulate people who took children into their care. It required a written order by a Justice of the Peace for all persons who took a child under three years of age for a payment and stipulated registration requirements. The Act also regulated the allowable payments, specifying that payments take the form of periodical instalments and could not exceed the sum of twenty shillings. Under the Act the payment of 'premiums' to baby farmers was banned. However, the legislation proved to be largely ineffective in preventing the sorts of abuses brought to light by the Makins' case.

The legal importance of the prosecution case in the conviction of the Makins' lies in the 'similar fact' or 'propensity' evidence admitted by Justice Stephen at the trial. Stephen allowed the evidence of the finding of the bodies of various unidentified infants, other than Horace Murray, and justified his decision on the authority of 'common sense' rather than any reference to existing legal authority. After the decision of the March 1893 appeal was confirmed by the Privy Council, the principle that the "evidence of a defendant's other criminal misconduct could be relevant" was incorporated into British common law.

== In media ==
=== Theater ===
- The story of Amber Murray and the Makin family inspired the 2008 Australian theatre production The Hatpin, which played in Sydney and in New York City. In 2009, it was nominated for three Sydney Theatre Awards and won one for best actress.

=== Television ===
- In August 2009, the Makin story was televised in the Discovery Channel's documentary series Deadly Women. The third-season episode 'Blood for Money' featured a re-enactment in which Pip Moore played Amber Murray.

=== Books ===
- Cossins, Annie (2013). The Baby Farmers: A chilling tale of missing babies, shameful secrets and murder in 19th century Australia: Allen & Unwin Publishers. ISBN 978-1-74331-401-2

== See also ==
- Frances Knorr
- Amelia Dyer
- Amelia Sach and Annie Walters
- Capital punishment in Australia
- List of serial killers by country
