= Jesse King =

Jesse King may refer to:

- Jesse King (musician)
- Jesse King (lacrosse)

== See also ==
- Jessie King (disambiguation)
- Jess King, American dancer and fitness instructor
