= Margaret Waters =

English murderer executed by hanging

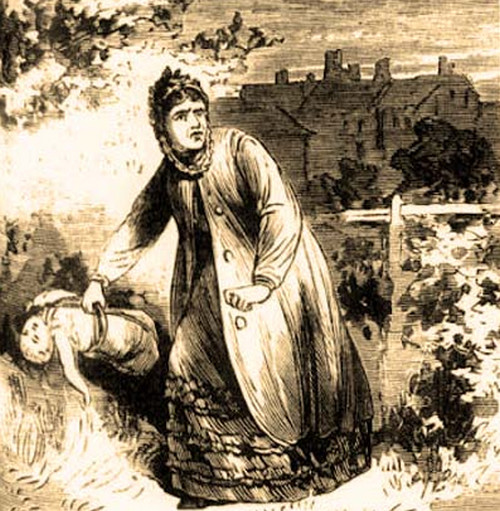
- Illustrated Police News illustration from 1870
- Born: Margaret Waters; 1835; Brixton, England
- Died: 11 October 1870 (aged 34–35); Horsemonger Lane Gaol, London, England
- Cause of death: Execution by hanging
- Other name: Willis
- Penalty: Death

Details
- Victims: 19+
- Country: England
- State: Brixton

Margaret Waters (1835–1870), otherwise known as Willis, was an English murderer hanged by executioner William Calcraft on 11 October 1870 at Horsemonger Lane Gaol (also known as Surrey County Gaol) in London.

Waters was born in 1835 and lived in Brixton. She was known for baby farming, the practice of taking in other women's children for money, which often resulted in infanticide.

Waters drugged and starved the infants in her care and is believed to have killed at least 19 children. Charged with five counts of wilful murder as well as neglect and conspiracy, Waters was convicted of murdering an infant named John Walter Cowen. Her sister, Sarah Ellis, was convicted in the same case for obtaining money under false pretences and sentenced to eighteen months' hard labour.

== See also ==
- List of serial killers by country
- Infanticide
