= Rhoda Willis =

English murderer (1867–1907)

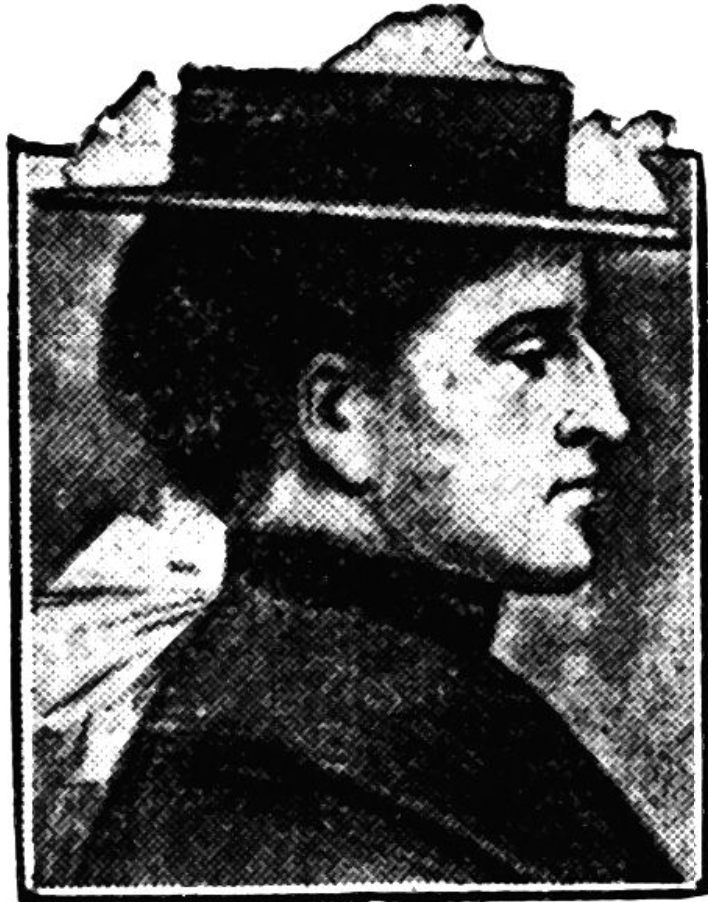
- Born: 14 August 1867
- Died: 14 August 1907 (aged 40)
- Other name: Leslie James
- Criminal charges: Murder
- Penalty: Death by hanging

Rhoda Willis, also known under the alias of Leslie James, (14 August 1867 – 14 August 1907) was an English baby farmer convicted of murder. She was the last woman to be executed in Wales.

She was born in Sunderland in 1867, and was sentenced to death at Glamorgan Assizes for murdering the illegitimate child of Maud Treasure on 3 June.

While lodging with a Mr and Mrs Wilson at Cardiff, Willis induced them to adopt a child for £1. One day, when Willis came home drunk and fell out of bed, Mrs. Wilson went to her aid and discovered in the bed the dead body of another child wrapped in a parcel. The infant, who had been suffocated, was Maud Treasure's child, whom Willis had undertaken to adopt and bring up for £6.

Willis was executed by hanging at Cardiff prison on 14 August 1907, her 40th birthday. She was the only woman to be hanged in Wales in the 20th century and the last baby farmer to be executed.
