= Felícitas Sánchez Aguillón =

Felícitas Sánchez Agullón or Sánchez Neyra
- Born: 1890; Cerro Azul, Veracruz, Mexico
- Died: 16 June 1941 (aged 50–51)
- Cause of death: Suicide by medication overdose
- Other names: "The Ogress of Colonia Roma," "The Female Ripper of Colonia Roma" and "The Human Crusher of Little Angels"
- Penalty: Died before being convicted

Details
- Victims: Several (40-50, at least one)
- Span of crimes: 1930–1941
- Country: Mexico
- State: Mexico City
- Date apprehended: April 11, 1941

Felícitas Sánchez Aguillón or Sánchez Neyra (1890 – June 16, 1941) was a Mexican nurse, midwife, baby farmer and serial killer, active during the 1930s in Mexico City, who killed babies in her care. Between 40 and 50 murders were attributed to her. She was also known as "The Ogress of Colonia Roma," "The Female Ripper of Colonia Roma" and "The Human Crusher of Little Angels."

== Early life ==
She was born in 1890 in Cerro Azul, Veracruz to a mother who was not affectionate towards her. As a child, she habitually poisoned street dogs.

During the 1900s, she became a licensed nurse and married Carlos Conde. She had twin daughters with him but didn't want to take care of them, and suggested to her husband that they give them up for adoption. He accepted this proposal, but after the daughters had been adopted, he changed his mind. However, Sánchez refused to tell him where their daughters were, which led to their divorce in 1910. In that year Sánchez moved to Mexico City.

== Crimes ==
In Mexico City, she lived in an apartment building located on Salamanca Street, Colonia Roma. She started to attend births and illegally practice abortions. She also began to trade in illegal adoptions. During the 1910s she was arrested twice for practicing illegal adoption and baby farming.

=== Murders ===
She killed the children that she couldn't sell and the newborns when the abortion failed. She murdered several children, some by poisoning or strangulation. She dismembered the bodies and incinerated them or threw them in the sewer.

== Arrest and death ==
On April 8, 1941, human remains were discovered near her building. Three days later Sánchez was arrested, along with two accomplices: her second husband Roberto or Alberto Covarrubías and a plumber, Salvador Martínez, who worked for Sánchez.

Sánchez killed herself before she was tried on July 16, 1941. She and her second husband had a third daughter, who was placed in state care after her father was convicted for involvement in the murders.

== See also ==
- List of serial killers by country
