= Washboarding =

Formation of ripples in gravel and dirt roads

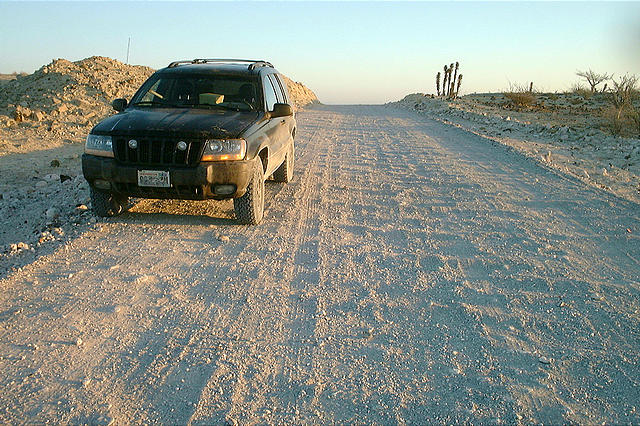
Washboarding effect on a road

Washboarding or corrugations is the formation of periodic, transverse ripples in the surface of gravel and dirt roads. Washboarding occurs in dry, granular road material with repeated traffic, traveling at speeds above 8.0 kilometres per hour (5 mph). Washboarding creates an uncomfortable ride for the occupants of traversing vehicles and hazardous driving conditions for vehicles that travel too fast to maintain traction and control.

== Mechanism ==
Washboarding or corrugation of roads comprises a series of ripples, which occur with the passage of wheels rolling over unpaved roads at speeds sufficient to cause bouncing of the wheel on the initially unrippled surface and take on the appearance of a laundry washboard. Most studies of washboarding pertain to granular materials, including sand and gravel. However, other work suggests that the phenomenon may occur in material which has some binding of particles, e.g. clay-like soils.

Highway department experts in the mid-1920s were aware that traffic volume and speed were primary causes of corrugations on gravel roads and cited the role of drive wheels tossing material as a factor.

Laboratory-scale studies of the phenomenon typically employ a wheel or a blade, which is towed behind a pivot point, tracing a circular path through a pan of the material under examination. These studies have investigated a variety of granular and viscous, even fluid, materials. In the laboratory, washboarding has been studied for a range of parameters, including the thickness and grain size of the material for varied wheel sizes, shapes, and masses. Experiments produced ripples for each parameter, above a threshold speed, when the wheel (or blade) began to bounce. Experiments also show that the pattern can move either against the direction of motion or in the direction of motion. They also show that a passive, non-driving wheel suffices to create corrugations and that displacement of material, rather than ejection, is the dominant mechanism.

Several articles about real-life washboarding on roads cite South Dakota Local Transportation Assistance Program (LTAP) Special Bulletin #29, "Dealing with Washboarding" by Ken Skorseth. Those sources attribute washboarding to three causes: dry granular materials, vehicle speeds, and the quality of the granular material. Other factors cited include vehicle speed, traffic volume, and hard acceleration or braking. The sources also claim that light vehicles are more likely to cause washboarding than heavy trucks.

Examples of corrugation in different soil types

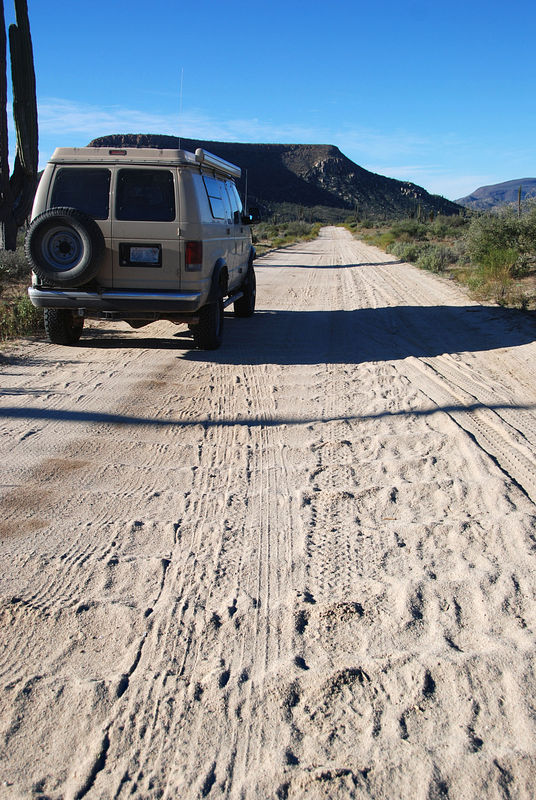
Fine-grained soil particles on a sandy road in Baja California

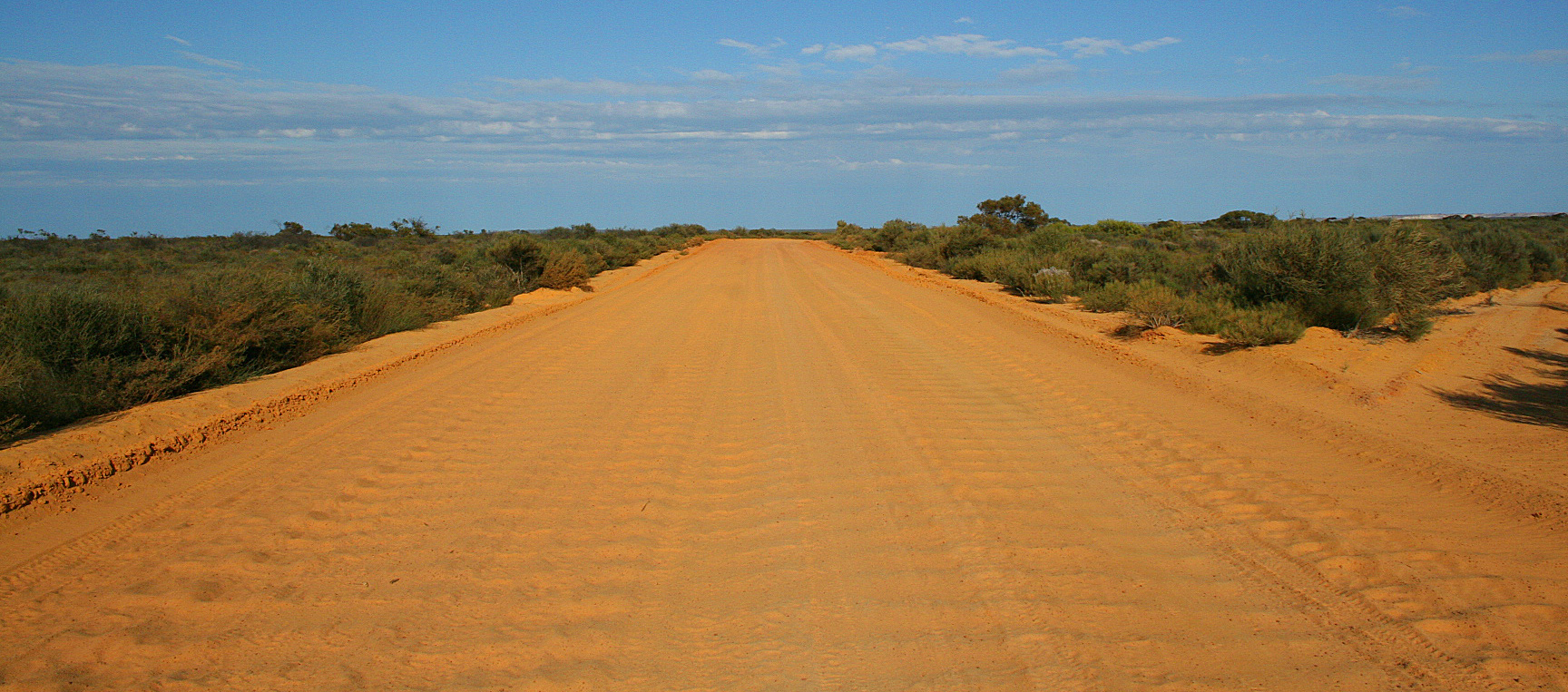
Semi-cohesive soil on a road in Kalbarri National Park, Western Australia

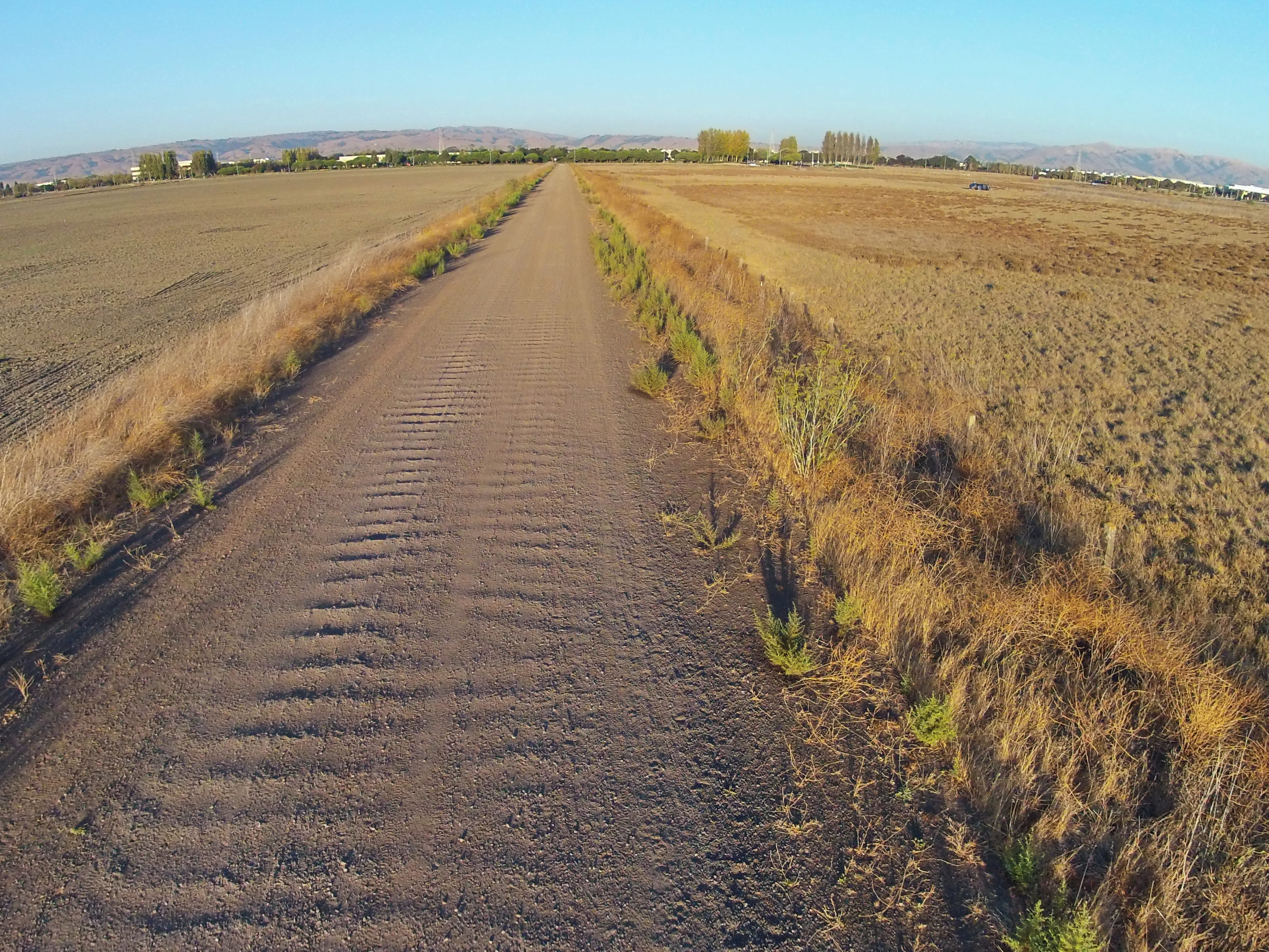
Coarse-grained soil particles on a gravel road in Fremont, California

== Maintenance ==
Guidance from various highway departments suggests that the choice of gravel can be key to mitigating washboarding. They cite "sieve analysis" tests that use a series of screens or sieves to characterize the sizes of particles contained within a gravel sample. Highway department guidance suggests a range of particle sizes from stones that are in the 1-inch (25 mm) range, mixed with progressively finer particles to include a small fraction of fine particles that bind the larger particles together. They also mention the role of equipment that can re-blend and smooth surfaces that have corrugated.

In 1925, the Nevada Department of Highways in the United States advocated mitigating corrugations with crushed pit-run gravel, using material 1 inch (25 mm) and smaller, including only the fines from crushing. Contemporaneous advice from Colorado was to use a well-graded gravel, not exceeding 1.25 inches (32 mm) and including 25–40% fines passing a 0.25-inch (6.4 mm) sieve, but not more than 5% passing a #10 (2.0-mm) sieve. The maintenance advice from Colorado was to drag or grade the road frequently, applying light volumes of new gravel with minimal sand content and providing good drainage with a crown. The same source advises reduction of traffic speed.

Guidance based on South Dakota LTAP Special Bulletin #29 and US Federal Highway Administration guidance from the same source in 2000 suggests that the surface gravel "should be a blend of stone, sand and fines that will compact into a dense, tight mass with an almost impervious surface". It emphasizes the proper gradation of gravel—100% passing the 0.75 inches (19 mm)) sieve—to have fractured stone to "interlock" and 4–15% fines passing the #200 (75-μm) sieve to act as a binder and create cohesiveness in the gravel; substituting other binders, such as clay is also recommended. Alternately, reclaimed asphalt can be incorporated in a half-and-half blend with quarried gravel to improve the binding properties of the surface. For existing washboarded surfaces, the bulletin recommends using a grader to cut and blend existing material to a depth one inch or more below the bottom of the washboarded segment and then add the new material into the top layer. Useful equipment includes a blade with rotating scarifying teeth or a replaceable bit-type cutting edge attached to the moldboard blade of the earth-moving equipment.
