= Helene Auguste Geisen-Volk =

Serial killer from the 1920s

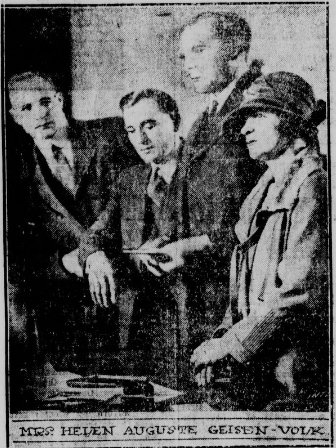

Helene Auguste Geisen-Volk was an American suspected serial killer, nurse and businesswoman who was charged with murdering 53 babies in her care at her baby farm.

== Biography ==
She was the operator of an infant farm in New York City at 235 East Eighty-sixth St from 1918 to 1925. She was the widow of a Prussian army officer and a former Red Cross nurse. In May 1925 an investigation by police was opened after multiple complaints from infants relatives, and one gentleman who said she had returned a baby that was not his. In early 1925, it's estimated that up to forty-four babies died while at Geisen-Volk's two "baby farms". Up to twelve babies in one month were buried, most of which had died from malnutrition. During the investigation and autopsy, one infant was found to have a fractured skull. A nurse who worked with Geisen-Volk stated that one infant of 18 months was held by the heels and dashed against a wall. One woman purchased a baby from the infantorium for $100, and was paid $10 by Geisen-Volk to sign the birth certificate paperwork.

Geisen-Volk was sentenced to 3.5 to 7 years in prison after pleading guilty to one count of baby substitution.

In total, Geisen-Volk was charged with the murder of fifty-three babies. The probation officer's report characterized her as "a woman without conscience who strangled and froze to death infants left in her care." The judge described her as "cruel, bestial, and a revolting anomaly in humankind".
