= Amelia Dyer =

British serial killer (1837–1896)

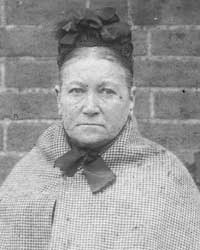
- Police photo of Dyer after her arrest in 1896
- Born: Amelia Elizabeth Hobley; 27 November 1837; Pyle Marsh, Bristol, England
- Died: 10 June 1896 (aged 58); Newgate Prison, London, England
- Cause of death: Execution by hanging
- Other names: The Ogress of Reading; The Reading Baby Farmer; Mrs Thomas
- Spouses: George Thomas; William Dyer
- Motive: Financial gain
- Conviction: Murder (1 count)
- Penalty: Death

Details
- Victims: 6 confirmed; evidence for 12; speculated to be hundreds
- Span of crimes: 1869–1896
- Country: England, United Kingdom
- Date apprehended: 3 April 1896

Amelia Elizabeth Dyer (née Hobley; 27 November 1837 – 10 June 1896), popularly dubbed the Ogress of Reading, was a British serial killer who murdered infants in her care from 1869 to 1896.

Trained as a nurse and widowed in 1869, Dyer turned to baby farming—the practice of adopting unwanted infants in exchange for money to support herself. She initially cared for the children legitimately, in addition to having two of her own. She allowed many children in her care to die through neglect, which resulted in a conviction in 1879 and six months' hard labour. Later, she directly murdered children she "adopted", strangling at least some of them, and disposing of the bodies to avoid attention. Mentally unstable, she was committed to several mental asylums throughout her life, despite suspicions of feigning, and survived at least one serious suicide attempt.

Dyer's downfall came when the bagged corpse of an infant was discovered in the River Thames, with evidence linking back to her. She was arrested on 4 April 1896. In one of the most sensational trials of the Victorian period, she was found guilty of the murder of infant Doris Marmon and hanged on 10 June 1896. At the time of her death, a handful of murders were attributed to Dyer, but she is presumed to have murdered hundreds, making her a candidate for history's most prolific serial killer.

Dyer's case led to stricter laws for adoption and child protection, and helped raise the profile of the fledgling National Society for the Prevention of Cruelty to Children (NSPCC), which formed in 1884.

== Early life ==
Amelia Elizabeth Hobley was born the fifth of six children (with three brothers – Thomas, James and William – and two sisters, both named Sarah Ann) in the small village of Pyle Marsh, just east of Bristol. She was the daughter of Samuel Hobley, a shoemaker, and Sarah Hobley (née Weymouth). Her childhood was marred by the mental illness of her mother, caused by typhus. Sarah would have violent fits, and Amelia was obliged to care for her until her death. Historians later speculated on how this experience might have affected her mental health, and what it might have taught her about the signs exhibited by people affected by mental illness.

Amelia had an older sister, Sarah Ann, who died in 1841 at age 6, and a younger sister, named after her deceased older sister, who died in 1845, aged a few months. After her mother died in 1848, Hobley lived with an aunt in Bristol for a time before serving an apprenticeship with a corsetmaker. After her father died in 1859, her eldest brother, Thomas, inherited the family shoe business. In 1861, at the age of 24, Hobley became permanently estranged from at least one of her brothers, James, and moved into lodging at Trinity Street in Bristol.

== Background ==
While she was living in Bristol, she married 59-year-old George Thomas. They both lied about their ages on the marriage certificate to reduce the age gap; George deducted eleven years from his age and Amelia added six years to hers. Amelia trained as a nurse, but had to leave nursing after she gave birth to a daughter. Her husband George died in 1869, and she was left in need of a new source of income.

Amelia soon learned of an easy way to earn a living—using her home to provide lodging for young women whose children had been born outside of marriage and then sending the babies away for adoption (a practice referred to as baby farming) (Note: Unmarried mothers during the Victorian era often struggled to gain an income since the Poor Law Amendment Act 1834 had released the fathers of illegitimate children from all financial obligation, and single parenthood and illegitimacy were stigmatized. This led to the practice of baby farming, in which individuals acted as adoption or fostering agents in return for regular payments or a single, up-front fee from the babies' mothers. Many businesses were set up to take in these young women and care for them until they gave birth. The mothers subsequently left their unwanted babies to be looked after as "nurse children".) or allowing them to die of neglect. Alongside taking in expectant women, Amelia advertised to nurse and adopt children in return for a substantial one-off payment and adequate clothing for the child. In her advertisements and meetings with clients, she assured them that she was respectable and married and that she would provide a safe and loving home for the child.

In 1872, she married William Dyer, a brewer's labourer from Bristol. They had two children together, but she eventually left her husband.

== Murders ==
After a few years in the baby farming business, Dyer decided to forgo the expense and inconvenience of letting the children die through neglect and starvation. Instead, she murdered the children soon after receiving them, thus allowing her to pocket most or all of the fee.

She was eventually arrested by the police in 1879, after a doctor had become suspicious about the number of deaths of children he had been called upon to certify while in Dyer's care. However, instead of being convicted of murder, she was sentenced to only six months' hard labour. Upon her release from prison, Dyer attempted to resume her nursing career. She was admitted several times to lunatic asylums due to mental instability and suicidal tendencies; these always coincided with times when it was convenient for her to "disappear". Being a former asylum nurse, Dyer knew how to behave to ensure a relatively comfortable existence as an asylum inmate. Dyer appears to have begun abusing alcohol and opium-based products during this period, and her mental instability may have been related to her substance abuse. In 1890, Dyer cared for the illegitimate baby of a governess. When the governess returned to visit the child, she immediately became suspicious and stripped the baby to see if a birthmark was present on one of its hips. It wasn't, and suspicions by the authorities led to Dyer having or feigning a breakdown. Dyer at one point drank two bottles of laudanum in a suicide attempt, but she survived because her long-term use of such substances had resulted in tolerance to laudanum.

Soon after this episode, Dyer returned to baby farming and murder. Realising the folly of having doctors issue death certificates, she began disposing of the bodies herself. Her activities again drew attention from police and parents seeking to reclaim their children. She and her family frequently relocated to different towns and cities to escape suspicion, regain anonymity, and acquire new business. Over the years, Dyer used a succession of aliases.

In 1893, Dyer was discharged from her final committal at the Somerset and Bath Lunatic Asylum. Two years later, she moved to Caversham, accompanied by an unsuspecting associate, Jane "Granny" Smith, whom Dyer had recruited from a workhouse and Dyer's daughter and son-in-law, Mary Ann and Arthur Palmer. This was followed by a move to 45 Kensington Road in Reading later the same year. In an effort to present a caring mother-daughter image, Smith was persuaded by Dyer to be referred to as "mother" in front of women who were transferring custody of their children to Dyer.

=== Murder of Doris Marmon ===
In January 1896, Evelina Marmon, an unmarried 25-year-old barmaid, gave birth to a daughter, Doris, in a boarding house in Cheltenham. She quickly sought offers of adoption and placed an advertisement in the "Miscellaneous" section of the Bristol Times & Mirror newspaper. It read: "Wanted, respectable woman to take a young child." Marmon had intended to go back to work and eventually reclaim her child. Coincidentally, next to her own, was an advertisement from a "Mrs. Harding", reading: "Married couple with no family would adopt a healthy child, nice country home. Terms, £10". Marmon responded, and several days later, she received a reply from Dyer. "Mrs. Harding" wrote that "I should be glad to have a dear baby girl, one I could bring up and call my own." She continued: "We are plain, homely people, in fairly good circumstances. I don't want a child for money's sake, but the company and home comfort... I and my husband are dearly fond of children. I have no child of my own. A child with me will have a good home and a mother's love".

Marmon wanted to pay a more affordable, weekly fee for her daughter's care, but "Mrs. Harding" insisted on the one-off payment in advance. As Marmon was in dire straits, she reluctantly agreed to pay the £10, and a week later, "Mrs. Harding" arrived in Cheltenham. Marmon handed over her daughter, a cardboard box of clothes, and £10. Distressed at having to give up care for her daughter, Marmon accompanied Dyer to Cheltenham railway station, and then on to Gloucester, before returning to Cheltenham. A few days later, she received a letter from "Mrs. Harding" saying all was well; Marmon wrote back but received no reply.

Dyer did not travel to Reading, as she had told Marmon. She went instead to 76 Mayo Road, Willesden, London, where her 23-year-old daughter Polly was staying. There, Dyer found some white edging tape used in dressmaking, wound it twice around the baby's neck, and tied a knot. Death would not have been immediate. Dyer later said: "I used to like to watch them with the tape around their neck, but it was soon all over with them."

Both women allegedly helped to wrap the body in a napkin. They kept some of the clothes Marmon had packed; the rest was destined for the pawnbroker. The following day, Wednesday 1 April 1896, another child, named Harry Simmons, was taken to Mayo Road. However, with no spare white edging tape available, the length around Doris's corpse was removed and used to strangle the 13-month-old boy.

On 2 April, both bodies were stacked into a carpet bag, along with bricks for added weight. Dyer then headed for Reading. At a secluded spot she knew well near a weir at Caversham Lock, she forced the carpetbag through railings into the River Thames.

== Downfall ==
=== Discovery of corpses ===
Unbeknownst to Dyer, three days earlier (on Monday 30 March 1896), a package had been retrieved from the Thames in Reading by a bargeman. This package, also dumped by Dyer, had not been adequately weighted and was easily spotted. It contained the body of a baby girl, later identified as Helena Fry. Detective Constable Anderson of the Reading Borough Police found a label from Bristol Temple Meads railway station, and using microscopic analysis of the wrapping paper, he discovered the faintly legible name "Mrs. Thomas", as well as an address.

This evidence was enough to lead police to Dyer, but not enough to connect her directly with a serious crime. After additional information obtained from witnesses and from Bristol police served to increase their concerns, Anderson and Sergeant James placed Dyer's home under surveillance. Subsequent intelligence suggested that Dyer would abscond if she became aware that she was under suspicion. The officers decided to use a young woman as a decoy, hoping to secure a meeting with Dyer to discuss her services.

On 3 April, Dyer was expecting her new client (the decoy) to visit, but instead, she found detectives waiting on her doorstep. Upon entering Dyer's home, they were struck by the stench of rotting flesh. Although no human remains were found, there was plenty of other evidence, including white edging tape, telegrams regarding adoption arrangements, pawn tickets for children's clothing, receipts for advertisements, and letters from mothers inquiring about the well-being of their children. The police estimated that in the previous few months alone, at least twenty children had been placed in the care of a "Mrs. Thomas", now revealed to be Amelia Dyer.

Dyer was arrested on 4 April and charged with murder, and her son-in-law (Arthur Palmer) was charged as an accessory. After dredging the Thames that month, six more bodies were discovered, including Dyer's last victims—Doris Marmon and Harry Simmons. Both of them had been strangled with white tape, which—as she later told the police—"was how you could tell it was one of mine". Eleven days after handing her daughter to Dyer, Evelina Marmon, whose name had emerged in items kept by Dyer, identified her daughter's remains.

=== Inquest and trial ===
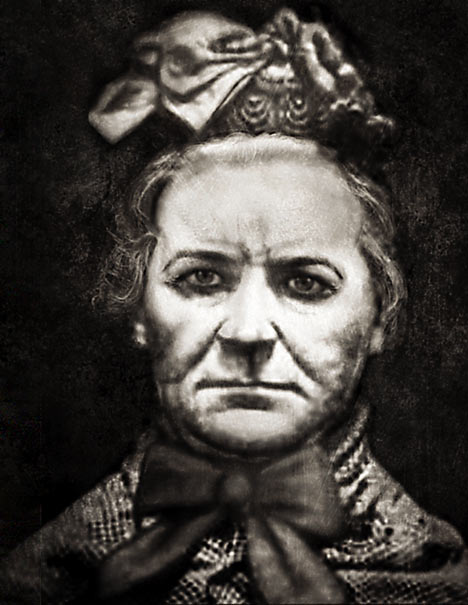
Dyer upon entry to Wells Asylum in Horrington, 1893

At the inquest into the deaths in early May, no evidence was found that Mary Ann or Arthur Palmer had acted as Dyer's accomplices. Arthur Palmer was discharged as the result of a confession written by Amelia Dyer. In Reading Gaol she wrote (with her spelling and punctuation preserved):

Sir will you kindly grant me the favour of presenting this to the magistrates on Saturday the 18th instant I have made this statement out, for I may not have the opportunity then I must relieve my mind I do know and I feel my days are numbered on this earth but I do feel it is an awful thing drawing innocent people into trouble I do know I should have to answer before my Maker in Heaven for the awful crimes I have committed but as God Almighty is my judge in Heaven an on Hearth neither my daughter Mary Ann Palmer nor her husband Alfred Ernest Palmer I do most solemnly declare neither of them had anything at all to do with it, they never knew I contemplated doing such a wicked thing until it was too late I am speaking the truth and nothing but the truth as I hope to be forgiven, I and I alone must stand before my Maker in Heaven to answer it all witness my hand Amelia Dyer.

— 16 April 1896.

On 22 May 1896, Dyer appeared at the Old Bailey and pleaded guilty to one murder, that of Doris Marmon. Her family and associates testified at her trial that they had been growing suspicious and uneasy about her activities, and it emerged that Dyer had narrowly escaped discovery on several occasions. Evidence from a man who had seen and spoken to Dyer when she had disposed of the two bodies at Caversham Lock also proved significant. Her daughter had given graphic evidence that ensured Dyer's conviction.

The only defence Dyer offered was insanity: she had been twice committed to asylums in Bristol. However, the prosecution argued successfully that her exhibitions of mental instability had been a ploy to avoid suspicion; both committals were said to have coincided with times when Dyer was concerned her crimes might have been exposed.

=== Execution ===
It took the jury only four and a half minutes to find her guilty. In her three weeks in the condemned cell, she filled five exercise books with her "last true and only confession". When a chaplain visited her the night before her execution and asked if she had anything to confess, she offered him her exercise books, saying, "isn't this enough?" Curiously, she was subpoenaed to appear as a witness in Polly's trial for murder, set for a week after her execution date. However, it was ruled that Dyer was already legally dead once sentenced, and her evidence would therefore be inadmissible. Thus, her execution was not delayed. On the eve of her execution, Dyer heard that the charges against Polly had been dropped. Dyer was hanged by James Billington at Newgate Prison on Wednesday, 10 June 1896. Asked on the scaffold if she had anything to say, she said "I have nothing to say", just before being dropped at 9:00 a.m. precisely. She was buried in an unmarked grave within the Newgate Prison Cemetery in London, England, following her execution.

== Later developments ==
It is uncertain how many more children Amelia Dyer murdered. However, inquiries from mothers, evidence of other witnesses, and material found in Dyer's homes, including letters and many babies' clothes, pointed to many more.

The Dyer case caused a scandal. She became known as the "Ogress of Reading", and she inspired a popular ballad:

The old baby farmer, the wretched Miss Dyer
At the Old Bailey her wages is paid.
In times long ago, we'd 'a' made a big fy-er
And roasted so nicely that wicked old jade.

Adoption laws were subsequently made stricter, giving local authorities the power to police baby farms in the hope of stamping out abuse. Despite this and the scrutiny of newspaper personal ads, the trafficking and abuse of infants did not stop. Two years after Dyer's execution, railway workers inspecting carriages at Newton Abbot, Devon, found a parcel. Inside was a three-week-old girl but, though cold and wet, she was alive. The daughter of a widow, Jane Hill, the baby had been given to Mrs. Stewart, for £12. She had picked up the baby at Plymouth, and dumped her on the next train.

== Jack the Ripper speculation ==
Because she was a murderer alive at the time of the Jack the Ripper killings, some have suggested that Dyer was Jack the Ripper. This suggestion was put forward by author William Stewart, although he preferred Mary Pearcey as his chosen suspect. There is, however, no evidence to connect Dyer to the Jack the Ripper murders, and she does not figure prominently among the Jack the Ripper suspects.

== In popular culture ==
Amelia Dyer appeared in the short story "Lost and Found" by Peter Wise in Disturbing the Water, his collection of themed original ghost stories set around rivers and lakes.

Dyer was portrayed by Joan Sims in the Granada Television series Lady Killers.

The character of Amelia Dyer also appeared in the short story "The Baby Farmer" by Philip Fracassi in his horror collection Behold the Void.

English folk singer Reg Meuross wrote a song about Dyer called "The Angel Maker", which is a track on his 2018 album Songs About A Train.

The Amelia Dyer case was partly dramatised on an episode of the 2022 BBC Radio podcast series Lucy Worsley's Lady Killers.

Amelia Dyer is the inspiration for the character ‘Mrs Bright’ in the short story ‘Confinement’ by Kiran Millwood Hargrave. The story is included in the Sunday Times bestseller ‘The Haunting Season’ published in 2021.

== See also ==
- Maxine Robinson
- Minnie Dean
- Miyuki Ishikawa
- Genene Jones
- Frances Knorr
- John and Sarah Makin
- Dagmar Overbye
- Amelia Sach and Annie Walters
- Louise Porton
- Lucy Letby
- Capital punishment in the United Kingdom
- List of serial killers in the United Kingdom
- Killing of the Clancy children
