= Shige Sakakura =

Executed Japanese serial killer

- Born: 1868; Tsu Domain, Empire of Japan (present-day Mie Prefecture, Japan)
- Died: September 9, 1915 (aged 46–47); Japan
- Cause of death: Execution by hanging
- Conviction: Murder
- Penalty: Death

Details
- Victims: 10–200+
- Span of crimes: 1898–1913
- Country: Japan
- State: Aichi
- Date apprehended: June 4, 1913

Shige Sakakura (坂倉しげ, Sakakura Shige; 1868 – September 9, 1915) was a Japanese baby farmer and serial killer who, together with two accomplices, was responsible for the murders of numerous infants in Hioki Wakasa (present-day Nagoya) between 1898 and 1913. For her crimes, both she and her accomplices were sentenced to death and hanged in 1915.

== Life and crimes ==
Shige was born in 1868 in the Tsu Domain, the daughter of a mechanic, and as an adult, she married a man belonging to the Sakakura family in Hioki Wakasa. In 1898, she began working as a midwife, accepting illegitimate children for 40-50 yen each, which she then began killing one after another. By May 1913, it was estimated that she and her women accomplices (45-year-old Tsuta Oki and 62-year-old Naka Ikai) had killed around 200 infants, with her most prolific years being during the Russo-Japanese War, where many Japanese soldiers died during combat, leaving widows. To avoid detection, they would move to different establishments around the prefecture.

The downfall of her operation came about when she killed the child of a geisha, who had the habit of visiting her to see her child. When she was not allowed to see it anymore, she became suspicious and contacted the police, who arrested Sakakura and her cohorts. Ten days later, the case was publicized in the newspapers, becoming a national sensation.

== Sentence and execution ==
On June 29, 1914, all three criminals were sentenced to death, with the sentence upheld on October 21 of the same year. Sakakura, Oki, and Ikai were all hanged on September 9, 1915.

== Similar incidents ==
Following this case, the government began a crackdown which led to the arrests of other baby farmers. On June 27, 1915, ten people led by 55-year-old Sushi Sasaki were arrested for killing 32 infants in Atsuta. Of these, four, including 62-year-old Suzuki Nobu, were taking care of more than 170 children. Just three days later, three people led by 68-year-old Yosomatsu Nakanishi were arrested in Echi District, Shiga for having murdered numerous children in the span of nine years.

== See also ==
- Amelia Dyer
- List of serial killers by country

== Bibliography ==
- Hiroshi Fukuda (July 31, 2001). 20世紀にっぽん殺人事典 単行本 [20th-century Japanese murder encyclopedia] (in Japanese). Social Shisosha. ISBN 4390502123.
