= Ideal Maternity Home =

Maternity home in Nova Scotia, Canada

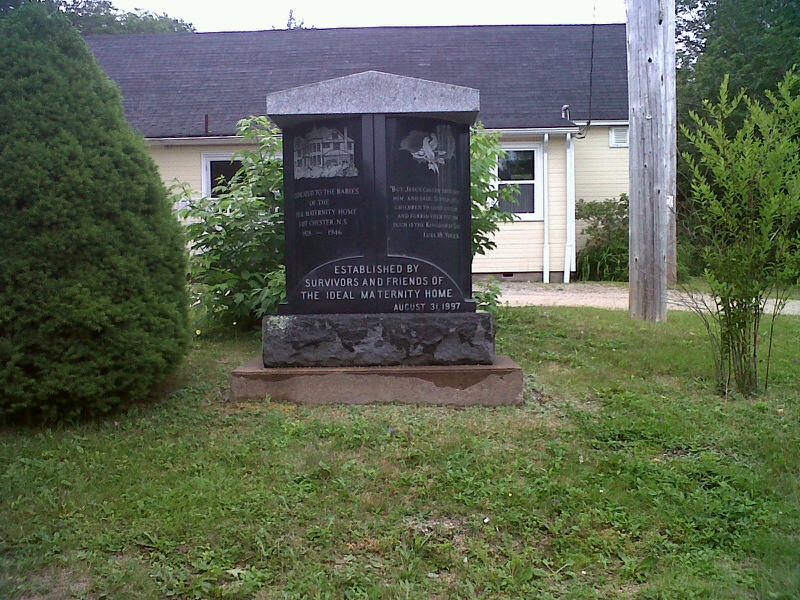
Memorial to victims of the maternity home, Chester, Nova Scotia

The Ideal Maternity Home was a maternity home in the Canadian province of Nova Scotia, operated from 1928 until 1947 by William Peach Young, a chiropractor and unordained minister of the Seventh-day Adventist Church, and his wife Lila Gladys Young, a midwife, although she advertised herself as an obstetrician. The business was eventually shut down by the government.

== History ==
Opened as "The Life and Health Sanitarium" in the late 1920s and later renamed to Ideal Maternity Home (IMH), the unlicensed maternity home promised both maternity care for married couples in Nova Scotia and New Brunswick and provided private birthing and placement of children of unwed mothers. The average wage at the time was $8 a week, and mothers were charged $500 for maternity services. The business also sold babies in the black market for up to $10,000 per baby. With 80-125 babies housed, it was Eastern Canada's largest maternity home. Between 800 and 1500 babies were born there from 1928 to 1946.

Starting in 1934, The Nova Scotia Department of Public Welfare gathered evidence against the Youngs, unaided by the Youngs' many admirers, including local businessmen, prominent Nova Scotia families, and politicians. However, the province's child welfare system lacked mechanisms to shut down the IMH. This was part of a wider failure of the province to provide modern social policy in areas such as poor relief and adoption law. In 1935, The Youngs were convicted of fraud for charging child care expenses for a dead child. They were charged with manslaughter in 1936 in relation to the death of a baby and mother at the IMH, but acquitted. In 1942 they were involved in an inquest related to a recent adoption from the IMH. In 1946 the government failed to prosecute them for having overreached their questionable medical qualifications but they were convicted on seven violations of the Maternity Boarding Houses Act. The Youngs renamed the IMH the "Battle Creek of Nova Scotia Rest Haven Park", but the business continued to operate as before, amid continuing court cases.

In 1946 the Montreal Standard newspaper published the article "Traders in Fear: Baby Farm Rackets Still Lure Girls Who are Afraid of Social Agencies". In the article, staff writer Mavis Gallant wrote that young girls were exploited by the Youngs and bullied into putting children up for adoption, that medical care was questionable, and that the Youngs were international traffickers in babies. The Youngs unsuccessfully sued for defamation and during the trial it was revealed that dead infants were buried in grocery boxes, or "butter boxes".

== Legacy ==
Survivors of the Ideal Maternity Home, now scattered throughout the U.S., Canada and Europe continue to meet, provide support, and assist one another with birth family searches.

The Home has been subject of several books, plays, and two movies. The title of Bette Cahill's book, Butterbox Babies is a reference to the "butter boxes," wooden grocery crates from a local dairy used as coffins for the babies killed at the Ideal Maternity Home.

The 1995 film Butterbox Babies was adapted from the book. Another film based on the story, The Child Remains, was released in 2017.
