= Jesse King (musician) =

African musician

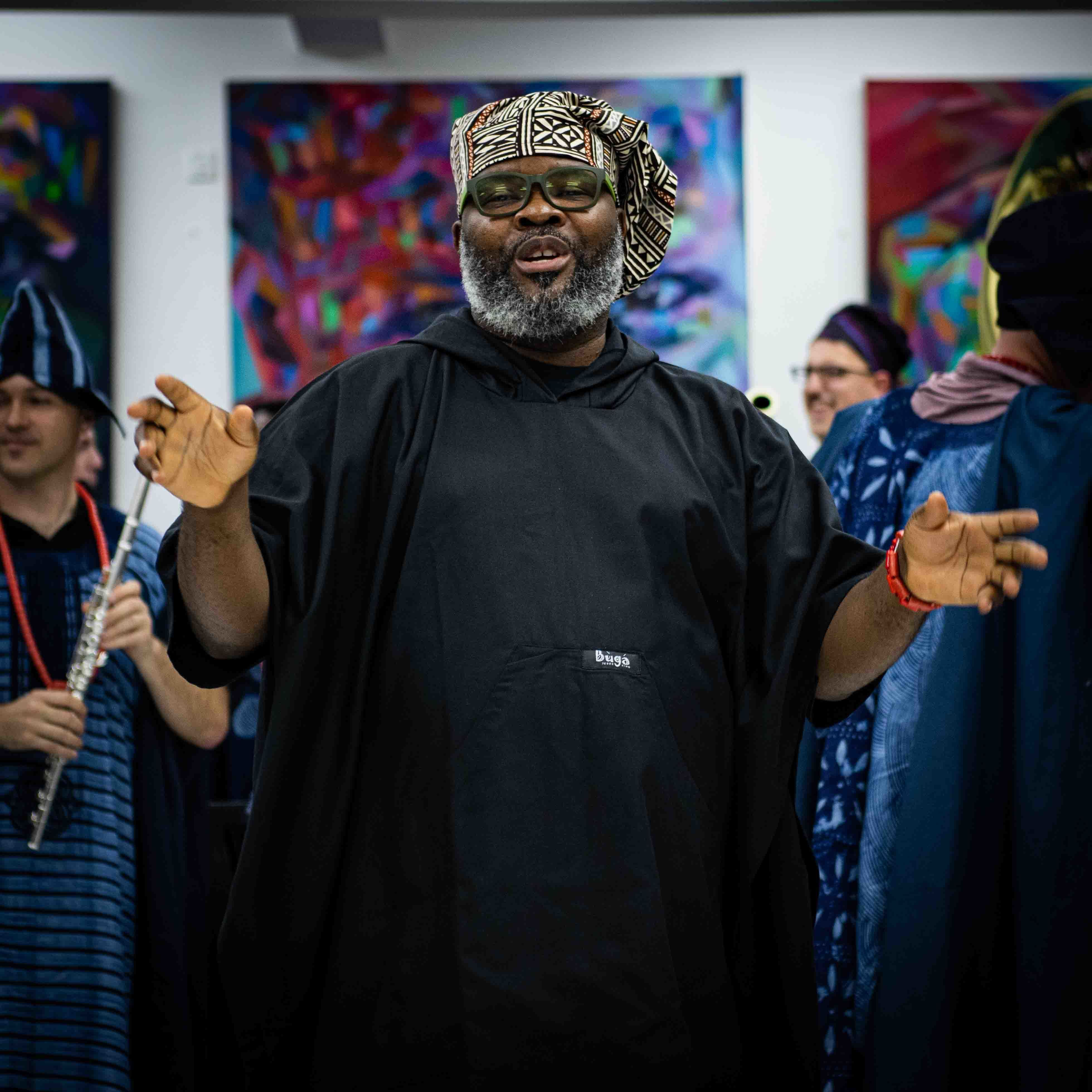

Background information
- Also known as: BÙGÁ
- Occupation: singer

Jesse "BUGA" King is a Nigerian musician who primarily sings in the Yoruba language, with his songs featuring aspects of the Yoruba culture and its proverbs. In 2016, he advocated support for Nigerian president Muhammadu Buhari, in an effort to help stabilize Nigeria's economy.

== Musical career ==
He released his first album in 2006 named BUGA. Before then, he used to do radio jingles, and he also worked as a producer. He once worked for Ekiti and Ondo State Broadcasting Corporations. King is an Auchi-born musician but has lived in Lagos. His music is mostly popular among the Yoruba people of Nigeria, especially in Ondo State. He studied in Ondo State University (now relocated to Akungba-Akoko as Adekunle Ajasin University in 1999).
