= Julia Fortmeyer =

19th century serial killer

Julia Fortmeyer (1837) was a 19th-century abortionist from St. Louis, Missouri, who was convicted of manslaughter in 1875. She was sentenced to 10 years in prison, and served seven.

== Early life ==
According to an article in The St. Louis Republican, dated August 12, 1874 and based on Julia's own accounts, Julia was born in 1837 on a farm in Greene Township, Erie County, Pennsylvania. Her family had German, Scottish, and French ancestry and also possessed aristocratic lineage: her grandfather was a knight who lived in England but had to flee to America during the American Revolutionary War, and her great-grandfather was connected to the Stuarts of England and was beheaded for political reasons. She had little formal education and married for the first time at the age of 16. This union lasted about two years until the death of her first husband, leaving her with a son who, at the time of her arrest, resided in Valparaiso, Indiana. On an unspecified occasion, her brother stabbed a man because he had a relationship with her. Later, she married her second husband, a man she described as "reckless in his behavior," who ended up dead in a fight instigated by another woman. Without financial resources after the death of her second spouse, Fortmeyer decided to enter the practice of obstetrics and midwifery clandestinely. To learn the trade, she traveled through several states in the American West before settling in St. Louis around 1867. In the same city, she married for the third time. However, Fortmeyer ended up informally separating from her third husband due to his financial dependence on her income, although he continued to visit her frequently. In St. Louis, she built a lucrative business focused on serving upper-class women who did not want children, conducting home visits and receiving patients in her own residence. She refused to reveal her maiden name in order to avoid scandals involving her family.

== Career as an abortionist ==
During her seven years of practice in St. Louis, Fortmeyer ran a highly lucrative, albeit illegal, business. She claimed to cater predominantly to wealthy women from the local high society, who sought her services because they did not want children or to avoid social stigma associated with a possible pregnancy outside of marriage. Her method of operation consisted of a "lying-in" arrangement, in which she housed pregnant women in her own home for secret deliveries or abortions, in addition to providing external home visits. In her statements to the press, Fortmeyer boasted of her technical proficiency, assuring that her skill was comparable to that of any male licensed physician in the city. Despite this, she admitted to "two or three infant deaths" under her care throughout her professional career. She also claimed to have extensive knowledge of irregular or illegal practices conducted by prominent doctors in the area—pointing to specific practices on North Fifth Street and Carr Street—alleging that these professionals would try to silence her due to the confidential nature of the information she possessed about the local clandestine network. In addition to being an abortionist, Julia also said that she sold medication that enabled women to have children and claimed to have successfully treated no fewer than 500 people.

=== Abortion methods ===
Although it is not explicitly stated what method Julia used to perform the abortions, the main method appeared to have been medical abortion. Although most newspapers indicate that authorities found several "instruments" in Julia's room, Julia later stated that she used those instruments only in extreme cases and that her main method was the use of medicine, mainly a kind of "powder", suggesting a mixed methodology. At that time, instrumental abortion was generally performed using instruments such as a rigid probe or a flexible rubber tube (catheter) inserted through the cervix. The object was left there for hours or days to act as a foreign body, causing irritation, contractions, and the subsequent expulsion of the fetus. In some cases, a long, thin clamp, usually a Winter ovum forceps, would be inserted into the uterus, trapping the fetus. Then, the abortionist would make a rotating motion that displaced the placenta and removed it afterwards. In medical abortion, patent medicines were often used. These were commercial medicines manufactured and sold directly to the public during the 18th, 19th, and early 20th centuries, without the need for a prescription and without a specific formula. In some cases, certain toxic plants that led to the degradation of the fetus were also used, such as Pennyroyal, Tansy, Cotton Root, Ergot and Savin. After the abortion was performed and the fetus was expelled, Julia collected the fetal remains and placed them in her cook stove.

== In the media ==
Author L.U. Reavis later recounted that prosecutor Colonel Normile had unsuccessfully sought to prove that Fortmeyer had burned a baby alive. During the trial, Normile argued for both murder in the first degree or manslaughter in the second. A transcript of the trial was published in 1875 by Barclay & Company of Philadelphia.

In 1899, a St Louis newspaper compared Fortmeyer to another abortionist, Henrietta Bamberger, who had been arrested under similar circumstances. The paper reported that Fortmeyer had "killed infants and burned their bodies in a cook stove."
