= Frances Knorr =

Australian serial killer

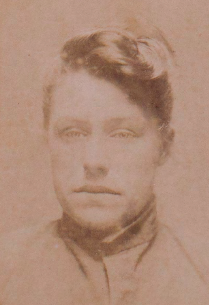
- Frances Knorr, c. 1892-1894
- Born: Minnie Thwaites; 10 December 1868; London, England
- Died: 15 January 1894 (aged 25); Old Melbourne Gaol, Colony of Victoria
- Other name: Baby Farming Murderess
- Children: 2
- Status: Executed by hanging
- Conviction: Murder
- Penalty: Death

Frances Lydia Alice Knorr (10 December 1868 – 15 January 1894) was an English serial killer known as the Baby Farming Murderess. She was found guilty of strangling an infant and hanged on Monday 15 January 1894.

== Early life and marriage ==
Frances Knorr was born to Minnie Thwaites in London, England on 10 December 1868. She emigrated to Sydney in the Colony of New South Wales in 1887. Her father was reportedly William Sutton Thwaites, a tailor from Chelsea. Initially, she worked as a domestic servant and married Rudolph (or "Randolph") Knorr, a German immigrant. She later had an affair with one Edward Thompson and moved to Melbourne; however, the short-lived affair was not successful and Knorr had to find a means to support herself and her daughter.

== Baby farming ==
In February 1892, Victoria was in the midst of a depression and jobs were scarce when Rudolph Knorr was sent to prison for selling furniture he had bought on hire purchase. Pregnant and penniless, Frances decided to set up business as a child minder (or more specifically baby farming), and moved around Melbourne, frequently using both her maiden and married names.

Frances Knorr strangled some of the babies she could not place elsewhere or sell to childless couples. While she was living on Moreland Road in the Melbourne suburb of Brunswick, she buried a victim in the garden, then two others at her subsequent residence in Davis Street.

== Arrest ==
The new tenant at the Moreland Road residence discovered the body of a baby girl while preparing a garden bed. The police soon traced them to Knorr, who was ascertained to have moved to Sydney with her husband, and dug up the gardens of other properties around Melbourne where she had lived, finding the corpses of two boys buried in the yard at the Davis St house. Sydney police arrested her on 8 September.

The police also arrested Rudolph Knorr on suspicion that he would also be wanted by the Melbourne police in connection with the murders, however he denied all knowledge of the burial of the infants. He was released from custody on the same day, as the Melbourne authorities indicated they were not investigating him at that time. Rudolph Knorr told police that until the previous April he had not seen his wife for 18 months, but around that time went to live with her in Brunswick. They had moved back to Sydney around 6 weeks before their arrest. Rudolph was rearrested the next day, after new evidence connected him to the murders of the infants found at Davis Street.

Frances, in interrogation by Detective Keating, maintained a "cheerful demeanour", although she was much affected by learning of the arrest of her husband. Throughout questioning, she remained adamant that she was not guilty of any crime such as murder. Police kept her under close watch, considering her a high chance to attempt escape from custody.

Shortly prior to her arrest, Knorr had given birth to a daughter, known as Rita Daisy Knorr, who ultimately was put into the care of the authorities of the Melbourne Gaol and later the Department of Neglected Children.

== Trial ==
After some postponements, Knorr came to trial in Melbourne on 27 November 1893, charged with the murder of the girl. She was also charged with having murdered the two other infants together with her husband, Rudolph.

Crown prosecutor Mr Walsh QC alleged that Knorr had the female infant in her possession from 8 to 11 April, after which the child was not seen again. Knorr had been regularly moving house and deceiving people as to her whereabouts, and on 11 April moved from Cardigan Street, Carlton to Moreland Road, Brunswick. Once moved in, she sent a servant girl to borrow a spade from a neighbour and reportedly spent some time attempting to dig in the garden. The following Saturday, she moved house again, this time together with her husband Rudolph to a house in Davis Street, Brunswick. Soon thereafter, the following tenant of the Moreland Road house found the body of the baby girl under a few inches of dirt.

A letter written by Knorr to "Ted Thompson" was presented to the court, which stated that the baby had died of consumption and was buried by another man. The letter was deemed pure fabrication.

Knorr gave a statement from the witness box and admitted that she had buried the babies in Moreland Road, but claimed that the children had died of natural causes. The Crown however demonstrated that they had been strangled with a tape and that the neck of one of the little boys had been compressed to less than half its normal size. Knorr was found guilty and, on 15 December, was sentenced to death by Justice Holroyd, with a large crowd having gathered to spectate the sentencing. Knorr, who had sobbed throughout the judge's address to her, collapsed and had to be carried out of the chamber to be transported to Old Melbourne Gaol to await execution.

The prosecution dropped the further charges relating to the bodies found at Davis Street, and Rudolph Knorr was discharged by the supreme court on 16 December. In a statement made after the trial, he insisted that the babies which had been seen alive with him had been adopted to interstate families, and were not the same ones found buried at the Davis St house.

Although Knorr found little support among the newspapers of the day, the public was deeply divided on her sentence. Many letters to the editors of newspapers called for clemency. Thomas Jones, the state's hangman, committed suicide nine days before the execution after his wife threatened to leave him if he hanged Knorr.

== Execution ==
Knorr was described as a model and penitent prisoner in the condemned cell and spent her time singing hymns and praying. She also made a written confession on the Saturday before her execution, part of which was made public the day after her execution. It read, in part:

Placed as I am now within a few hours of my death, I express a strong desire that this statement be made public, with the hope that my fall will not only be a warning to others, but also act as a deterrent to those who are perhaps carrying on the same practice. I now desire to state that upon the charges known in evidence as Number 1 & 2 babies, I confess to be guilty.

Knorr's execution was at 10:00am on Monday 15 January 1894. She had spent her last few hours singing hymns. Her last words were recorded as: "Yes, the Lord is with me. I do not fear what men may do to me, for I have peace, perfect peace." When the trap door was released, she dropped seven feet, six inches. Death was recorded as "instantaneous". Her death mask is on display at the Old Melbourne Gaol.

== See also ==
- List of serial killers by country
- Martha Needle
