= Washboard (laundry) =

Tool for hand-washing textiles

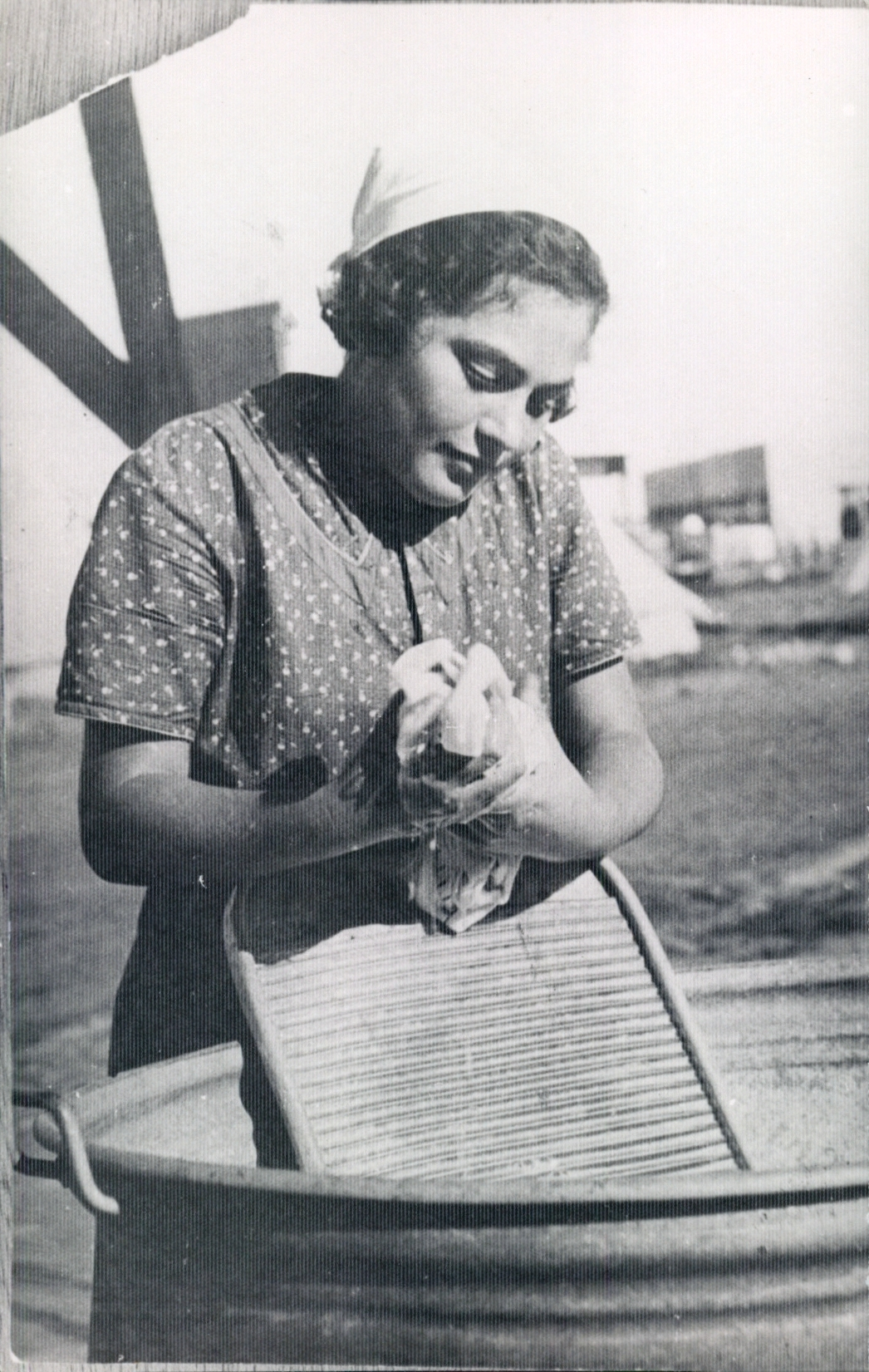
Woman on an Israeli kibbutz using a washboard to do laundry

A washboard or a scrubbing-board is a tool designed for hand-washing clothing. With mechanized cleaning of clothing becoming more common by the end of the 20th century, the washboard has become better known for its secondary use as a musical instrument.

== Description and use ==
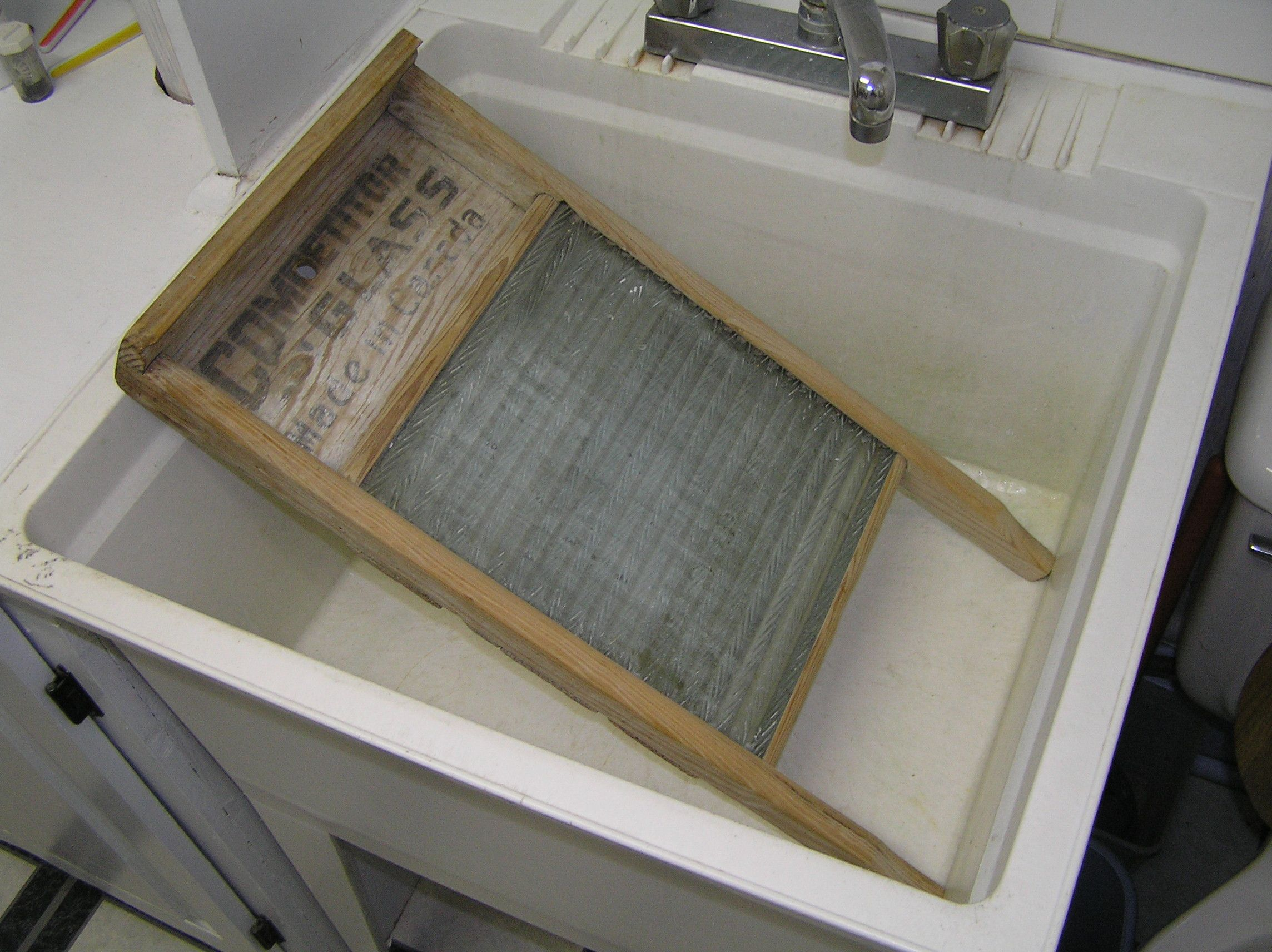
A glass washboard

The traditional washboard is usually constructed with a rectangular wooden frame in which are mounted a series of ridges or corrugations for the clothing to be rubbed upon. For 19th-century washboards, the ridges were often of wood; by the 20th century, ridges of metal were more common. A "fluted" metal washboard was patented in the United States by Stephen Rust in 1833. Zinc washboards were manufactured in the United States from the middle of the 19th century. In the late 20th century and early 21st century, ridges of galvanized steel are most common, but some modern boards are made of glass. Washboards with brass ridges are still made.

Many parts of the world still use washboards for washing clothes. Clothes are soaked in hot soapy water in a washtub or sink, then squeezed and rubbed against the ridged surface of the washboard to force the cleansing fluid through the cloth to carry away dirt. Washboards may also be used for washing in a river, with or without soap. Then the clothes are rinsed. The rubbing has a similar effect to beating the clothes and household linen on rocks, an ancient method, but is less abrasive. Military personnel often use washboards to do their laundry when no local laundry facilities exist.

Some writers claimed that using a washboard was superior to using older laundry machines, because they save water and heating costs and are not so hard on the clothing.
