= List of people executed in New Zealand =

A total of 85 people were executed under New Zealand's capital punishment system while it was in force. An additional five New Zealand soldiers were executed under military regulations in France during World War I, though they subsequently received posthumous pardons under the Pardon for Soldiers of the Great War Act 2000.

== List of executed persons ==
Name	Date of execution	Details
Wiremu Kingi Maketu	7 Mar 1842, Auckland	First person to be judicially executed in New Zealand (although not the first person sentenced to death). Convicted of murdering the family for whom he was working as a farm-hand.
Joseph Burns	17 Jun 1848, Auckland	Convicted of murdering a naval officer Lt Snow and his family at Devonport Naval Base in order to rob them.
Maroro	19 Apr 1849, Wellington	Convicted of murdering a man and his children in a fit of rage at a previous conviction for theft – he denied having any particular connection to his victims.
William Good	17 Jun 1850, Wellington	Convicted of murdering a seaman (John Ellis) aboard the General Palmer, a merchant barque moored in Wellington Harbour.
William Bowden	27 Apr 1852, Auckland	Convicted of murdering a blacksmith, stabbing him with a knife during a fight.
Charles Marsden	12 Feb 1856, Auckland	Convicted of murdering a Māori woman of the Te Arawa iwi. The incident caused significant tension between Te Arawa and the government, with some members of Te Arawa threatening to storm the prison and kill Marsden should the government not act against him.
John White	11 Jul 1856, Auckland	Convicted of murdering his partner, Ann Fay, with an axe. It is alleged that he was abusive towards her, and that he killed her when she refused to stay with him and threatened to reveal previous crimes he had committed. White denied the charge, and said that Fay was sought after by one of the witnesses against him, William Harris, and that Harris's mistress, Ann Scott (also a witness), killed Fay out of jealousy.
John Killey	18 Mar 1858, Auckland	Convicted of murdering a man in Whangārei after a drunken argument.
James Collins	30 Jan 1862, Wellington	A Colour-Sergeant convicted of murdering an officer who had constantly tried to bully him. The first person to be executed privately, rather than in public.
Teherei	10 Jul 1863, Picton	
Richard Harper	2 Sep 1863, Auckland	Murder of his wife, Jane Alice Harper via Butchers Knife on 16 June 1863.
Ruarangi	18 Apr 1864, Auckland	Convicted of murdering a woman and her daughter on a farm at Kaukapakapa. Another daughter, who was present but survived, told the court that Ruarangi stated an intent to kill other pākehā in the area, allegedly with the intent of sparking conflict, although the relationship between the settlers and local Māori was considered relatively good at the time.
Nikotema Okeroa	18 Apr 1864, Auckland	Convicted of murdering Te Waiti, described as a Māori chief, in the Bay of Islands. Okeroa was argued by some to be mentally incapable (Māori witnesses used the term porangi).
Alexander McLean	21 Oct 1864, Auckland	Convicted of murdering his wife with a gun. McLean argued that the firearm was discharged accidentally.
William Andrew Jarvey	24 Oct 1865, Dunedin	Convicted of poisoning his wife with strychnine in order to marry his mistress.
John Jones	6 Apr 1866, Dunedin	Convicted of murdering a man at Waipori. Jones had been drinking heavily, and claimed that he had no recollection of the event.
James Stack	7 Apr 1866, Auckland	Convicted of murdering his mother-in-law, Mary Finnigan, 55 and her sons, James, 17, Benjamin, 14 and John, 12.
Mokomoko	17 May 1866, Auckland	Convicted of killing Karl Völkner, a missionary who was believed by the Te Whakatohea iwi to be a government spy. See Volkner Incident.
Heremita Kahupaea	17 May 1866, Auckland	Convicted of killing Karl Völkner, a missionary who was believed by the Te Whakatohea iwi to be a government spy. See Volkner Incident.
Hakaraia Te Rahui	17 May 1866, Auckland	Convicted of killing Karl Völkner, a missionary who was believed by the Te Whakatohea iwi to be a government spy. See Volkner Incident.
Horomona Poropiti	17 May 1866, Auckland	Convicted of killing Karl Völkner, a missionary who was believed by the Te Whakatohea iwi to be a government spy. See Volkner Incident.
Mikaere Kirimangu	17 May 1866, Auckland	Convicted of killing Karl Völkner, a missionary who was believed by the Te Whakatohea iwi to be a government spy. See Volkner Incident.
Richard Burgess	5 Oct 1866, Nelson	Maungatapu murders; convicted of murdering and robbing four people on the road from Nelson to the West Coast goldfields. A fourth man, Joseph Sullivan, was spared the death penalty for testifying against the others.
Thomas Kelly	5 Oct 1866, Nelson	Maungatapu murders; convicted of murdering and robbing four people on the road from Nelson to the West Coast goldfields. A fourth man, Joseph Sullivan, was spared the death penalty for testifying against the others.
Philip Levy	5 Oct 1866, Nelson	Maungatapu murders; convicted of murdering and robbing four people on the road from Nelson to the West Coast goldfields. A fourth man, Joseph Sullivan, was spared the death penalty for testifying against the others.
Robert Wilson	20 Dec 1867, Nelson	Convicted of the murder of his prospecting mate James Lennox at Deadmans Creek.
John Dinsely Swales	16 Apr 1868, Lyttelton	Murdered his business partner, John Rankin, by setting fire to his premises in Colombo Street, Christchurch, as he lay in bed.
Whakamau	23 Mar 1869	Whakamau was convicted of murdering a pedlar named Kornerop after hitting him in the head with a tomahawk from behind. The murder took place at Ohau, near Levin, north of Wellington.
Hamiora Pere	16 Nov 1869, Wellington	Convicted of treason, making him the only person to be executed in New Zealand for a crime other than murder. A participant in Te Kooti's War.
Anthony Noble	16 Feb 1871, Hokitika	Convicted of murdering a girl aged nine or ten in Hokitika. Noble eventually gave a confession in which he admitted to murdering and sexually assaulting the girl, although he denied raping her. Noble was originally from Baltimore (newspapers described him as "coloured" — his father was African American and his mother was Spanish), and he was working in Hokitika as a casual labourer.
Simon Cedeno	5 Apr 1871, Lyttelton	A butler to William Robinson, a wealthy land-owner and a member of the Legislative Council. Convicted of murdering a maid of the household, apparently after suffering racist insults. Cedeno was from Central America, and was black.
Kereopa Te Rau	5 Jan 1872, Napier	A leader of the Pai Marire religious movement convicted of involvement in the Volkner Incident (five others already having been executed – see above). Pardoned in 2014.
Joseph Eppwright	29 Jul 1873, Auckland	An American sailor convicted of murdering a man named Thomas Garrity while in port at Russell. "EPPWRIGHT, a constable, who stabbed another constable, was hanged at Auckland on 29 July. He made a speech exculpating Fisher, stating that he stabbed GARRITY in the heat of a quarrel without intent to kill him. He denied that he had ever been in gaol before. After the cap was fitted the drop was knocked off but only 6 inches and efforts to pull it down proved ineffectual. The culprit was then taken off, the drop was readjusted and the second time it fell clear, causing instantaneous death."
Charles Dyer	30 Oct 1874, Auckland	Convicted of murdering his mistress by dousing her in kerosene and then setting her alight.
Nutana	19 Feb 1875, Auckland	Nutana, who was also known by the English name Newton, was convicted of killing a young Maori girl, Henrietta, by breaking her neck.
John Robinson Mercer	7 May 1875, Lyttelton	A ship's cook convicted of raping and murdering a young girl while in port at Lyttelton.
William Henry Woodgate	25 Jan 1877, Picton	Willam was accused and found guilty at the Supreme Court sitting of murder of the newborn baby of his niece Susan Woodgate who was the daughter of his brother Robert. He was thought to be the father of the child.
Martin Curtin	6 Feb 1877, Auckland	Curtin was convicted of the murder of Denis Shanaghan at Ararimu. The murder occurred on 16 Dec, 1876. Shanaghan was beaten to death and it was thought Curtin may have hit him with an axe, the head of which was later found in a fire on Curtin's property.
Te Mohi	23 May 1877, Auckland	
James Welsh	19 Feb 1879, Invercargill	Convicted of murdering his wife, Louisa Welsh, at Waikawa Station in 1878
Ah Lee	5 Nov 1880, Dunedin	Convicted of murdering Mary Young at the Kyeburn gold diggings near Naseby in order to rob her home. Although he is alleged to have confessed the crime to police, he denied it in court and at the gallows, and his conviction was the subject of considerable public debate.
Tuhiata	29 Dec 1880, Wellington	Convicted of murdering Mary Dobie on the road to Te Namu Bay, near Ōpunake.
Wiremu Hiroki	8 Jun 1882, New Plymouth	Convicted of murdering John McLean, a member of a government surveying party operating in the area east of Waverley. He is alleged to have acted out of belief that McLean had been killing his pigs.
Taurangaka Winiata	4 Aug 1882, Auckland	Winiata was convicted of murdering a workmate, Edwin Parker, on June 27, 1876, by attacking him with a bill-hook. Winiata then fled to the King Country where he was given sanctuary by the Maori King, Tawhiao, after Winiata had told the King a half-caste had committed the murder. He remained in the King Country until his arrest in June 1882 after being lured out of the area on the pretext of supplying pigs for sale.
John Donohue	11 June 1884, Hokitika	Donohue was convicted of murdering James Gifford at Maori Creek.
Rowland Herbert Edwards	15 Jul 1884, Napier	Convicted of the murder of his wife and four children by slitting their throats. The family had lived at Ormondville.
John Caffrey	21 Feb 1887, Auckland	Convicted of murdering Robert Taylor of Great Barrier Island, father of Caffrey's one-time fiancée, Elizabeth Anne Taylor. The intent was to abduct Elizabeth, but they came to believe that they had been detected, and decided to flee to Valparaíso in a vessel stolen from Caffrey's employers. They were forced to turn back by a storm, and managed to hide for a time in Australia before being returned to New Zealand. A third person Grace Cleary, accompanied the two, and was charged as an accessory.
Henry Penn	21 Feb 1887, Auckland	Convicted of murdering Robert Taylor of Great Barrier Island, father of Caffrey's one-time fiancée, Elizabeth Anne Taylor. The intent was to abduct Elizabeth, but they came to believe that they had been detected, and decided to flee to Valparaíso in a vessel stolen from Caffrey's employers. They were forced to turn back by a storm, and managed to hide for a time in Australia before being returned to New Zealand. A third person Grace Cleary, accompanied the two, and was charged as an accessory.
Haira Te Piri	13 May 1889, Napier	Te Piri was a bushman and shearer who was convicted for the triple homicide of Frank and Jane Pook and their infant son, Bertie at their residence at the Mataahu Store. Te Piri had lost his own wages playing cards and the wages of another worker, which his employer had asked him to pass on. He stabbed Frank and Jane Pook to death during the robbery and severely wounded Bertie - the young boy dying three days later.
Makoare Wata	28 Sep 1889, Napier	Wata was convicted of the murder of Robert Gollan at Table Cape, Mahia. The court heard that Wata held a grudge against Gollan, who had accused him of stealing sheep from the Ormond's property. An accomplice (Reihana) testified that Wata had hidden a gun near Gollan's residence and shot Gollan three times before setting fire to the house.
Alexander James Scott	22 May 1893, Auckland	A resident of Waikumete (then spelled Waikomiti, and usually considered part of Glen Eden today) who was convicted of poisoning his neighbour, allegedly in order to more easily continue a claimed relationship with the victim's wife. Scott claimed that the deceased had committed suicide, and that he had previously spoken of doing so.
Minnie Dean	12 Aug 1895, Invercargill	The only woman to be executed in New Zealand. A "baby-farmer" convicted of killing children in her care.
Etienne Brocher (aka Stephen Bosher)	21 Apr 1897, Wellington	Convicted of the double murder of his neighbours. Brocher entered into their house and stabbed them to death during a robbery in Petone, Lower Hutt.
William Sheehan	21 Jul 1897, Lyttelton	Convicted of the murder in April 1897 of one Agnes Lawcock at Amberley.
Frank Philpott	23 Mar 1898, Wellington	Convicted of murdering Ernest Hawthorne, whom he was living and working with in a bush hut in Silverstream, Upper Hutt.
Charles Clements	12 Apr 1898, Dunedin	Convicted of murdering his wife.
Enoka	2 May 1898, New Plymouth	Convicted of murdering his wife with a tomahawk.
Alexander McLean	31 Aug 1901, Lyttelton	Convicted of murdering a woman and her two children in Eyreton. McLean was the family's manservant, and is alleged to have killed them in order to rob the house.
James Ellis	28 Feb 1905, Wellington	Convicted of murdering Len Collinson, who worked clearing bush at Te Awaite, in southern Wairarapa. Ellis had been accused of minor criminal acts in the area, and Collinson had attempted to drive Ellis away from the work camp – it was reported that Collinson was aware of Ellis's previous conviction for rape.
Tahi Kaka	21 Jun 1911, Auckland	Seventeen-year-old youth convicted of murdering John Freeman, a gum-digger in Northland, while robbing him. Kaka's execution gave rise to controversy because of his youth.
Alfred Mortram Biddle	13 Dec 1913, Lyttelton	A blacksmith from Mayfield who was convicted of murdering the wife of a man who had hired him. Biddle stated that he did not know why he committed the crime, and denied suggestions that he had sexual motivations. He apparently attempted to commit suicide by poison while hiding from police.
Arthur Rottman	18 Mar 1915, Wellington	Convicted of murdering Joseph and Mary McCann, who employed him on their farm, with an axe.
Frank Edward Bennier	19 Jan 1918, Wellington	Convicted of murdering his wife, Ethel Emma Bennier, when she decided to leave him.
Frederick William Eggers	5 Mar 1918, Lyttelton	Convicted of murdering John Coulthard (and attempting to murder two others) in the course of holding up a vehicle transporting miners' wages in Runanga.
Dennis Gunn	22 Jun 1920, Auckland	Convicted of shooting Augustus Edward Braithwaite, the postmaster of Ponsonby, to obtain the keys to the local post office which he later robbed. Believed to be worldwide the first person convicted of a capital crime based entirely on fingerprint evidence.
Samuel John Thorne	20 Dec 1920, Auckland	Convicted of shooting Sydney Seymour Eyre, near Pukekohe. He was alleged to be in some form of relationship with Eyre's wife (who was said by prosecutors to be unwilling).
Hakaraia Te Kahu	10 Oct 1921, Auckland	Hakaraia te Kahu aged 27 was charged with wilfully murdering Patrick Richard Elliot at Mokai on Easter Sunday, 27 March 1921 so that he could steal money from him.
John Tuhi	19 Apr 1923, Wellington	Convicted of murdering Herbert Henry Knight of Johnsonville.
Daniel Cooper	16 Jun 1923, Wellington	A "baby-farmer"at Newlands near Wellington, convicted of killing children in his care (his wife Martha was found "not guilty").
Robert Herbert Scott	17 Apr 1924, Auckland	Convicted of murdering 12-year-old Gwendoline Kathleen Murray at Makaraka, Gisborne.
Arthur Thomas Munn	29 Jul 1930, Auckland	A Northcote man convicted of poisoning his wife Lillie in order to inherit her property and marry his mistress.
George Coats	17 Dec 1931, Wellington	A worker on the Mount Victoria Tunnel excavations, convicted of murdering his pregnant girlfriend and hiding her body on the site.
Edward Tarrant	6 Mar 1933, Wellington	A woodcutter aged 58 from Australia, convicted of killing an elderly farmer named James Flood at Picton in November 1931 with an axe to steal a considerable sum of money.
John Hubert Edwards	11 Dec 1933, Auckland	Convicted of the murder of Christian Cunningham.
George Edward James	15 Dec 1933, Wellington	Killed his live-in partner Cecilia Smith in their flat in Ohiro Rd, Brooklyn. He was later seen merrily cycling with her 4-year-old son Noel across the city. Hours later Noel's body was found wedged in between some rocks at Shelly Bay. His head had been bashed. James then went to a Lambton Quay pub before throwing himself into the harbour. By the time police discovered the body of Ms Smith – lying on the bed, her throat slit – James had been rescued. He had left a suicide note on the wharf, blaming his daughter for his decision to kill those he loved.
William Alfred Bayly	20 Jul 1934, Auckland	A farmer convicted of murdering his neighbours, and suspected of earlier murdering his cousin.
Charles William Price	27 Jun 1935, Wellington	Allegedly an alcoholic, convicted of murdering his mistress in a field near Napier. Allegedly for a small sum of money, after an all day drinking session.
Capital punishment abolished for ordinary crimes from 1941 to 1950
William Geovanni Silveo Fiori	13 Mar 1952, Auckland	Murdered Jack Gabolinsky in his bed, along with his wife. Fiori reportedly was after the 1,163 pound payroll cheque Gabolinsky had withdrawn from the bank in order to pay his workers at the Minginui mill in the Ureweras the following day.
Eruera Te Rongapatahi	14 Sep 1953, Auckland	Convicted of murdering James Henderson, a taxi driver, at Mt. Somers Township in June 1953.
Harry Whiteland	21 Dec 1953, Auckland	Convicted of murdering 19-year-old Dorothy Rose Haldane, a Railways booking clerk at Reefton Railway Station on 27 August 1953.
Frederick Foster	7 Jul 1955, Auckland	Convicted of murdering his ex-girlfriend at a dairy on Queen Street.
Edward Te Whiu	18 Aug 1955, Auckland	Convicted of murdering an elderly woman who discovered him during a burglary.
Harvey Allwood	13 Oct 1955, Auckland	Convicted of murdering John Hughes of Makarewa.
Albert Lawrence Black	5 Dec 1955, Auckland	Convicted of murdering Alan Keith Jacques at a cafe on Queen St. Auckland on 26 July 1955.
Walter James Bolton	18 Feb 1957, Auckland	Last person to be executed in New Zealand. Found guilty of poisoning his wife.
Capital punishment abolished for ordinary crimes in 1961, abolished for all crimes in 1989

=== Military executions ===
In addition to those executed under New Zealand's regular criminal justice system, five New Zealand soldiers fighting as part of the Allied war effort in World War I were court-martialed and subsequently executed by firing squad.

#	Name	Executed	Details
1	Frank Hughes	25 Aug 1916	Convicted of desertion.
2	John Sweeney	2 Oct 1916	Convicted of desertion.
3	John Braithwaite	29 Oct 1916	Convicted of mutiny. After first being incarcerated for repeatedly being away without leave, he was accused of instigating a prison riot, although he claimed that he only involved himself in an attempt to calm it.
4	John King	19 Aug 1917	Convicted of desertion.
5	Victor Spencer	24 Feb 1918	Convicted of desertion.

The executions were not made public at the time. All five were pardoned in 2000 when New Zealand Parliament concluded that their convictions had been unjust, and that today, all would be regarded as mentally unfit to serve. Two of them (King and Sweeney) were born in Australia.

== Number of executions by location ==
Initially, executions were carried out in public, and could be conducted at any suitable location – in at least one case (Joseph Burns, 1848) the prisoner was taken to the scene of the crime for execution. Executions from 1862 were carried out in private. Later, the number of locations was reduced to only two – Auckland (generally Mount Eden Prison) and Wellington (generally Mount Crawford Prison). In total, ten cities were the sites of executions.

Location	Number of executions
Auckland	41
Wellington	17
Lyttelton	7
Dunedin	4
Napier	4
Nelson	4
Hokitika	2
Invercargill	2
New Plymouth	2
Picton	2
Europe (in World War I)	5
