= Sarah-Jane and Anna Flannagan =

New Zealand 19th century murderers

Sarah-Jane (born 1841) and Anna Flannagan (born 1866), a mother and daughter, were 19th-century New Zealand murderers. Like Caroline Whitting (1872) and Phoebe Veitch (1883) before them, but unlike Minnie Dean subsequently (1895), the two women were initially sentenced to death for the killing of Anna's illegitimate child and Sarah-Jane's grandchild but were subsequently reprieved. In this instance, the intervention of the then-Governor-General of New Zealand William Onslow, 4th Earl of Onslow was required for mitigation of the death penalty to life imprisonment.

== Trial, verdict and psychiatric incarceration ==
On January 10, 1891, the body of Anna Flannagan's illegitimate infant was found mutilated, after Miss Flannagan had taken her from Jane Freeman, the wet nurse who was feeding her; although Anna Flannagan had been introduced as "Mrs Stevens", Freeman knew her to be the latter. It was alleged that in a moment of maternal madness, Anna Flannagan had killed the child, although she was later lucid enough to be arrested on attempting to flee to Sydney, Australia. In February 1891, Christchurch, New Zealand residents Anna Flannagan (25), her mother Sarah Jane Flannagan (50) and Sarah Jane's husband, former Constable Daniel Flannagan, were all accused of killing Anna's illegitimate child, although they claimed to have been attacked by a gang of male assailants who killed the infant and dragged Anna through the streets at the end of a rope. Daniel Flannagan was later discharged, but on February 25, 1891, Sarah-Jane and Anna Flannagan were found guilty and sentenced to death. On March 13, 1891, the sentence was then commuted to life imprisonment. However, in November 1892, it was reported that Anna Flannagan had become a 'hopeless lunatic' and she was taken from Lyttelton Gaol to Sunnyside Hospital, a Christchurch psychiatric institution. Subsequently, it was reported that there were petitions for the release of Anna Flannagan from psychiatric care to the Minister of Justice and Governor-General in 1894. Anna was subsequently released in 1895 Sarah-Jane was also relocated to the Terrace Gaol, but was released in 1906 after serving 15 years of imprisonment. Daniel Flannagan was never able to rejoin the New Zealand Police thereafter, despite his earlier acquittal.

However, given the social stigma attached to illegitimacy during the 19th and early 20th centuries, and the leniency meted out to perceived 'spontaneous' infanticide cases born of wretched parental circumstances such as poverty, lone parenting, family violence, and other contextual factors, Bronwyn Daley has suggested that capital cases of infanticide carried out by mothers were usually mitigated to life imprisonment after appeal to higher judicial authorities or, in this case, Ministers of the Crown and the Governor-General himself As William Onslow noted in his official record of the appeal for clemency in this instance, there was also widespread public aversion to use of capital punishment in New Zealand when it came to culpable women, given that Minnie Dean (1895) was the only woman executed in New Zealand criminal history until capital punishment was abolished in 1961.

There are few other resources available to contemporary scrutiny, other than contemporary newspaper records of the trial, the sentence and its commutation to life imprisonment. The newspaper accounts also recorded the subsequent determination that Anna Flannagan was experiencing mental illness and needed to be admitted to Sunnyside Hospital from Lyttelton Gaol in 1892, as well as that of the appeal to William Onslow, 4th Earl of Onslow (the Governor-General of New Zealand) for clemency in parliamentary official records, and a subsequent petition that requested the release of Anna Flannagan from Sunnyside in 1894. According to Bronwyn Dalley's analysis of late-19th and early-20th-century New Zealand infanticide cases, Anna was released from Sunnyside custody in 1895 and her mother from Terrace Gaol in 1906. Thereafter, there is no further information about the lives of Anna and Sarah Jane Flannagan after their respective releases from incarceration.

In recent assessment of the case, Alison Clarke commented that the case of the Flannagans did not attract considerable public sympathy due to the perceived brutality of the purported offence, the greater age of Anna Flannagan (25) and that this had not been her first pregnancy. Thus, she was perceived as being in a different existential and moral context from younger single women who were perceived as being 'seduced and abandoned' by unscrupulous and negligent older men or irresponsible male contemporaries. Indeed, as the Wellington Evening Post commented, there had been widespread outrage when the original sentence of capital punishment in New Zealand had been commuted to imprisonment after Flannagan had been found guilty of murder. Clarke suggests that this may have influenced the later death penalty meted out to baby farmer Minnie Dean in 1895, who was the only woman executed in New Zealand criminal history until the abolition of capital punishment in New Zealand in 1951.

== See also ==
- Caroline Whitting, also convicted of child murder and sentenced to death, but also reprieved (1872)
- Phoebe Veitch, also convicted of child murder and sentenced to death, but also reprieved (1883). Died in 1891, under psychiatric care.
- Winifred Carrick, acquitted of child murder (1917)
- Lillian Fanny Jane Hobbs, acquitted of child murder (1907).
- Minnie Dean, convicted of child murder. Only woman executed in New Zealand criminal history (1895).
- Daniel Cooper (New Zealand murderer), convicted of child murder and executed for that crime (1923).
- Infanticide in Nineteenth Century New Zealand, an overview of similar contemporary cases in this context.
