= Tom Long (hangman) =

Tom Long (died 15 December 1908) was the New Zealand government hangman in the late 19th-early 20th century, although it was not a full-time position. He executed the "baby farm" murderer Minnie Dean, the only woman hanged in New Zealand. Long, an Irishman who claimed to have been an executioner in Australia, was appointed as New Zealand's first official hangman in 1877. In a newspaper interview in 1905 he claimed to have executed "fifteen in this country but hundreds in India.". He was killed in 1908 while felling trees at Kauangaroa, east of Wanganui.

== People hanged by Long ==
- 1895 Minnie Dean, murderer.
- 1897 William Sheehan, murderer.
- 1905 James William Ellis, murderer.
- 1877 William Woodgate, murderer

== See also ==
- Capital punishment in New Zealand
- List of people executed in New Zealand
