= Leo Hannan =

New Zealand murderer and self-confessed serial killer

- Born: Leo Sylvester Hannan; 23 October 1900; New Zealand
- Died: 9 October 1962 (aged 61); Auckland Prison, Paremoremo, New Zealand
- Convictions: Murder; Theft; Breaking and entering
- Penalty: Life imprisonment

Details
- Victims: 4
- Span of crimes: 1942–1950
- Country: New Zealand
- States: Hawke's Bay, Wellington
- Date apprehended: 1950

Leo Sylvester Hannan (23 October 1900 – 9 October 1962) was a New Zealand serial killer who was convicted of the 1950 murder of watchman Frederick Stade in Wellington, for which he was sentenced to life imprisonment. A few months before he died of cancer in 1962, he confessed to his lawyer that he had committed three additional murders dating back to 1942, for which he was never charged.

== Early life and crimes ==
Leo Sylvester Hannan was born on 23 October 1900, the youngest of four children born to Irish immigrants Edmond and Annie Hannan (née Bannor). He was abandoned by his family at an early age, and for the rest of his life, Hannan reportedly had no friends and worked as an itinerant laborer in the lower parts of North Island.

Between 1926 and 1941, Hannan was convicted of several crimes, which included prison escapes. The earliest of these was an escape from Rangipo Prison in July 1926, followed by a conviction for breaking and entering in Waipukurau in 1931. In 1940, he was brought before a magistrate's court on six charges of breaking, entering and theft, to which he pleaded not guilty. He was subsequently found guilty largely thanks to fingerprint evidence, and was sentenced to 18 months of penal labor the following year.

== Confessed killings ==
Hannan's first confessed killings were those of sisters Annie and Rosamond Smyth, both of whom were members of the Salvation Army who were found hacked to death at their home in Wairoa on 22 August 1942. The 60-year-old Annie was a renowned and respected missionary who had returned to New Zealand only two years prior after spending 36 years in Japan, and was taking care of her 70-year-old elder sister, who was deaf and partially disabled. Neither woman had been seen since 10 August, and their absences were finally reported when neighbors became suspicious. Upon entering the house, authorities found that both had been bludgeoned to death with a poker, with the killer having tied Annie to an armchair and gagged her. No money had been taken from the home, with police initially believing that they had been attacked by Māoris. This theory was ruled out days later, and it was replaced by the belief that the sisters were killed in a sexually motivated attack. Despite utilizing fingerprint evidence, nothing led to an arrest. In his confessions, Hannan claimed that he was acquainted with Annie Smyth as she often visited local bars and preached to the laborers about the evils of drinking, and had decided to stage the crime scene to look like an attempted rape by lowering her panties.

The other killing Hannan confessed was the murder of 69-year-old retired railway guard Herbert William 'Sunny' Brunton, who was found bludgeoned to death at his hut near the Wairoa railway station on 17 December 1948. The day prior, Brunton's neighbor claimed that a stranger had shone a torch through his window and asked whether there were any women in the neighboring house, and when he replied in the negative, the stranger asked who lived there before abruptly leaving. On the next day, the neighbor went to the hut, where he found Brunton's body propped up against the bed, with at least six axe wounds to the head. A large-scale investigation was launched to resolve his murder, with authorities taking the fingerprints of upwards of 3,000 men, but none were linked back to the crime scene. Hannan claimed that his motive for this murder was to steal money, but had found only a half-bottle of gin.

== Murder of Frederick Stade and imprisonment ==
On the early morning of 11 August 1950, Hannan was at the Wellington Railway Station when he was confronted by the 54-year-old nightwatchman Frederick Andrew Stade, apparently over the use of the station's toilet. In response, Hannan attacked him with an iron bar and beat Stade to death before fleeing the station, only to be arrested hours later. At the time of his arrest, he still had blood spots on his face, left hand and shoes, and even a small piece of flesh above the cuff of his trousers. Hannan attempted to explain that the blood supposedly originated from a persistent nosebleed he had had over the last four days, but this was not believed and he was subsequently charged with Stade's murder.

At his murder trial, Hannan was found guilty and sentenced to life imprisonment, with hard labour with the presiding Justice Humphrey O'Leary describing the murder as "particularly cruel and vicious". Had Hannan committed his final murder a few months later, he would've faced execution, as New Zealand reinstated capital punishment in December 1950.

== Confessions, death and aftermath ==
After his conviction, Hannan was detained at the Auckland Prison in Paremoremo, where he worked at the prison quarry. Aside from a short-lived prison escape in the mid-1950s, he remained there until his eventual cancer diagnosis in 1962. Around June of that year, he contacted his former lawyer, George Israel Joseph, and gave details to the previous three murders. After his passing, Joseph wrote a book about unsolved murders in 1982, in which he wrote down the confessions in great detail, but referred to Hannan simply by "X". A few years after the book's publication, a policeman by the name of Sherwood Young read it and contacted Joseph to ask about the client's name, with the latter revealing him to be Hannan. Subsequently, Young revealed all of this information after writing a biographical article on Annie Smyth's life, noting that it was highly unlikely that any comparisons of Hannan's fingerprints and that of those found at the crime scene had been done.

As of April 2022, the murders of the Smyths sisters and Brunton officially remain unsolved. Hannan's confessions have neither been definitively confirmed nor ruled out, and he remains a suspect in their killings.

In November 2023, the murders were reported to be solved.
