= Edward Tarrant =

Edward Tarrant may refer to:

- Edward H. Tarrant, Texas politician
- Edward Tarrant (murderer), New Zealand axeman
