= Daniel Cooper =

Daniel or Dan Cooper may refer to:

- Sir Daniel Cooper, 1st Baronet (1821–1902), speaker of the Legislative Assembly of New South Wales
- Dan Cooper, alias used by the aircraft hijacker whom the media later dubbed D. B. Cooper
- Dan Cooper (born 1946), executive producer, author, and Fox News journalist
- Daniel C. Cooper (1773–1818), American surveyor, farmer, miller and political leader
- Daniel Cooper (convict and merchant) (1785–1853), convict transported to New South Wales who became a successful merchant
- Dan Cooper (comics), a fictional character featured in Tintin magazine between 1954 and 1977
- Dan Cooper (CSI: Miami), a fictional character who works in the lab in CSI: Miami, played by Brendan Fehr
- Daniel Cooper (murderer) (1881–1923), convicted New Zealand baby farmer and illegal abortionist
- Daniel Cooper (motorcyclist) (born 1987), British motorcycle racer
