= Infanticide in 19th-century New Zealand =

Infanticide in 19th-century New Zealand was difficult to assess, especially for newborn indigenous Māori infants. Resultantly, many New Zealand women who might otherwise have been sentenced to penal servitude or capital punishment had their sentences commuted to the lesser charge of "concealment of birth" under the Offences Against the Person Act 1867. However, the relative leniency extended only to mothers of concealed or hidden infants who subsequently died. Fathers, grandparents and "baby farmers" like Minnie Dean, the only woman to be executed in New Zealand history, and Daniel Cooper in the 1920s were viewed as more culpable for the death of such infants.

== Background ==
In a 2012 volume on childbirth, pregnancy, infant mortality and infanticide in 19th-century New Zealand, Alison Clarke places the deaths of newborn infants in colonial era 19th-century New Zealand in historical context. Over the four decades (1861-1899) for which statistical evidence is available, an estimated cumulative 53,000 such infants perished in New Zealand. Early New Zealand colonial statistics show that from 1872 onwards, more than 1,000 infants or small toddlers died each year from maladies and environmental factors summarised below, peaking at 1,995 such fatalities in 1883, although in 1872 (1,941 deaths), 1875 (1,816 deaths), 1886 (1,889 deaths), and 1899 (1,806 deaths), more than 1,800 infants died.

If the afflicted child was less than one month old at their time of death, there may have been premature birth. Without the complex life support technology available in the late 20th and early 21st centuries, this would often prove fatal due to the lack of sufficient infant respiratory development. Other than that, newborn infants might also perish from sharing beds with their parents, who might roll over and smother them inadvertently during sleep; negligent parental alcohol abuse and impaired standards of care; administration of alcohol to prevent infant cries; and the associated use of soporific drugs such as laudanum and chlorodyne. In the case of prostitutes and single pregnant women, sexually transmitted diseases might be passed on to their newborn infants during prenatal development, while inadequately warm clothing might affect mortality for the newborn infants of the poor. Infant malnutrition might occur due to lack of awareness of the benefits of breastfeeding for infants, as well as the absence of medical treatment for conditions such as bronchitis, pneumonia, influenza, whooping cough, diphtheria, diarrhoea, enteritis, gastritis, ileus, inherited syphilis and tuberculosis.

== Māori infanticide ==
In the case of Māori infants, detailed statistics about infant health and mortality are not as readily available, due to their presence in remote and isolated rural dwellings inaccessible through roading and civic transport. Furthermore, there are social policy considerations that need to be considered, as British colonialism distorted social relationships that may have either hampered or facilitated infanticide in the Māori context. Given the ravages of higher incidence of poor housing, sanitation, malnutrition and infectious diseases, overall 19th-century Māori infant mortality was probably higher than those of European counterparts. However, large whānau (family) structures were often available to care for children, which may have prevented some cases of infanticide. While there are accounts of apparent infanticide, they often seem to be second-hand information from immigrant Church of England missionaries. These noted that female infanticide seemed to be prevalent in the context of slavery, cross-cultural relationships and other such inhospitable grounds. Intertribal warfare was also a factor that militated against female infant survival, given the prospect that surviving male children could then become warriors for the defence of a particular iwi (tribal community and social network). However, it is highly probable that the advent of colonialism and introduction of European transport and weapons technology affected the severity and scale of prior tribal conflicts, so this may not reflect an accurate prognosis of Māori infanticide. As time went on, many Māori adopted Christian religious beliefs due to missionary efforts and this reduced the incidence of slavery, cannibalism and homicide amongst such Maori communities, although it also returned during the early 20th century during times of economic hardship. In short, it is hard to assess the frequency and prevalence of Māori infanticide and its permissibility during the 19th century.

== Legal context ==
Altogether, Clarke identifies 98 cases of deliberate or intentional infant death that resulted in legal proceedings. Of these, 94 were undertaken against the mother of the deceased infant, while fourteen of these were also undertaken against the baby's father, grandparents or friends of the mother who had assisted in the birth and its concealment. Four involved the father of the deceased infant and another individual, often a grandparent. Usually, if the birth had been concealed, the maximum penalty was two years imprisonment, and as Bronwyn Dalley notes, women could often plead mitigating circumstances through male sexual coercion (a "seduction" narrative), although this was not always successful. Some women were convicted of infanticide or manslaughter in this context, although many others were acquitted. Men could not similarly plead "seduction" or the trauma of unassisted childbirth in this context; as witnessed by the case of William Henry Woodgate, who committed incest with his niece that subsequently resulted in her pregnancy and childbirth, leading to the killing of the newborn and his subsequent execution for murder in 1877.

Originally, concealment arose in 17th century Anglo-Scottish law and sought to punish secret illegitimate pregnancies and childbirths in which mothers hid the bodies of the infants after birth or stillbirth. As noted above, not all mothers were successful in pleading concealment- the cases of Phoebe Veitch and Sarah-Jane and Anna Flannagan stand out as exceptions to this general rule, although the defense was usually effective when it came to mitigated imprisonment or even acquittal, in some circumstances. Throughout the British Empire in the 1890s, concern arose over the negligent standards of "care" offered by baby farmers. Minnie Dean and others may have been viewed as equivalents to John and Sarah Makin and Frances Lydia Alice Knorr in adjacent New South Wales in Australia, or Amelia Dyer in the United Kingdom, who were her historical contemporaries. Such trials also built up a volume of relevant case law within imperial jurisdictions.

== History ==
In 1869, Annie Bates had been domestic servant for a Greymouth merchant and his family on the South Island's West Coast. Her employer, William Coates, spotted the body of a newborn infant in the lavatory, with the subsequent revelation of the decomposed body of a female infant. Bates confessed to the apparent concealment of the infant when she was apprehended, but held that it had been stillborn when she gave birth alongside the Grey River adjacent to the town. Mary Ann Swift, a dancer at the Greenstone Pub, argued that had not been the case when she appeared as witness for the prosecution in this case, but her opinion was dismissed. She was found not guilty of either murder, manslaughter or concealment by the subsequent jury when the case came to trial.

In the case of Mary Ann Spendlove, concealment was judged to have occurred and she was acquitted of murder in 1866, and subsequently sentenced to two years imprisonment on the lesser charge. Spendlove had cast her baby's body adrift in Nelson Harbour in 1865. The infant had been conceived during an extramarital affair while her husband was absent. She claimed that the infant was premature, but medical examination demonstrated that it was, in fact, a fully developed infant, had been born alive and died of suffocation. Alison Clark argues that one of the reasons that she was not treated as leniently as some of the other women cited in this section was that as a married woman, Spendlove "should have known better."

From Galway in Ireland, Bridget Gee (1845-?) was initially described as a "good industrious girl and of a kind disposition" by her employer, Mrs Elizabeth Aikman, while employed as a maidservant at Dunedin's Glasgow Hotel. However, in June 1871, she gave birth and then concealed the body of her newborn infant beneath her mattress. Although she claimed that the death of the infant was accidental, the infant had suffered concussion to the head, fractures and lost blood through laceration, possibly caused by scissors or a stay. Although Gee was not found guilty of manslaughter or murder, she was found guilty of concealment. Her lawyer, Robert Stout, claimed that the injuries to the dead infant were likely to have been accidental, and the Crown Prosecutor, Bryan Haggit, concurred. Gee was suspected of brutally killing her child and was not acquitted of concealment, however.

Similarly, Margaret Collins (1854-?) was illiterate and had no family available in New Zealand to assist her covert pregnancy and childbirth, thus leading to her slashing her newborn baby's throat and hiding the body under her mattress in Milton in 1875. However, she was found guilty of manslaughter, given the nature of her infant's fatal injuries, although only sentenced to two months imprisonment.

In 1884, Auckland mother Rosina Smith initially fostered out her newborn infant, but then absconded with the two-month-old baby, before burying him in a market garden in Parnell, an Auckland suburb. The presiding judge in that case, Chief Justice James Prendergast, suggested three options to the jurors- they could either find Smith guilty of murder, manslaughter or insanity. The jury found the latter verdict was the case, although this was an unusual outcome, as courts usually did not find that mothers were mentally ill when they killed their newborn babies in this context However, at least three other women may have had diagnosable mental health concerns by current medical standards, given Clarke's assessment of newspaper accounts and court documents.

In 1878, Margaret Wilson gave birth to a daughter at Timaru's Benevolent Society, an emergency housing facility for indigent women, their infants and children, but the baby only survived for three months before it was strangled. When Wilson appeared before the New Zealand Supreme Court, it was apparent that she was unfit to face charges of murder in the context of her daughter's death. She was admitted to the Sunnyside Hospital in Christchurch and custodial staff testified that she was unable to comprehend what was said to her, was violent and had to be restrained.

Fanny Bonnington (1868-?) was a Blenheim domestic servant who gave birth at sixteen in secret in 1884, and threw the dead body of her infant down an ablutionary facility. Postmortem medical investigation revealed that it had been alive at its birth and had several superficial scratch wounds on its trunk, and cause of death was determined to be haemorrhaging from the umbilical cord. Doctor Thomas Porter noted that Bonnington appeared to be experiencing what might be defined today as post-partum depression, as had one of the defendant's sisters after her pregnancy and childbirth. Her grandfather also experienced what might be diagnosed as Alzheimer's disease in contemporary medical practise. Bonnington was found not guilty of concealment through reason of insanity at the time of birth and although held for three months doing kitchen work at the Wellington Lunatic Asylum, she was subsequently released and returned to Blenheim. Justice William Richmond commented that in such instances, judges and juries were often swayed by the 'seduction narrative' and held the man who had impregnated such women more culpable than the "abandoned" and isolated single women who gave often traumatic birth without the attendance of family or doctors in the new colony, so they would not convict a young woman of infanticide, murder or manslaughter in this context.

Margaret Heads/Edwards was servant to a Dunedin bank clerk and his family. In 1889, while boarding with a labourer's wife, this young woman gave birth and concealed the body of the infant in that woman's wardrobe. It was unclear whether the infant had been born alive or not in this instance and she was acquitted of concealment of birth. She had been "seduced" and then had been left indigent. As with Bonnington's case, a Tuapeka Times journalist referred to Heads/Edward's 'seduction" and argued that the man who had abandoned her was "truly" responsible for this tragedy.

Sometimes, however, the balance of evidence pointed otherwise. In 1881, Dunedin coroner Thomas Morland Hocken advised against keeping an infant in bed with its parents, as there could be problems with respiratory distress if the sleeping parents rolled over and inadvertently suffocated the baby in question. However, in the case of Mary Ann Weston, there were grounds to suspect that the death of the infant may have been deliberate, as Dunedin's Industrial School orphanage had taken her two earlier children into custodial care, and Weston was drinking heavily. The coronial inquest jury found Weston had a manslaughter case to answer, but Weston was later acquitted of manslaughter in the Dunedin Supreme Court.

== Popular perceptions ==
In 1895, Edward Tregear, a civil servant and local intellectual, suggested to Wellington's Evening Post newspaper that New Zealand society was responsible for the spate of infanticides in recent years of colonial history. He was referring to the contemporary case of Mary Davis (1889), in which that Wellington domestic servant had given birth secretly, and as with Margaret Heads/Edwards had concealed the baby's body in her wardrobe. Davis had tied but not cut the infant's umbilical cord, and was acquitted of both murder and concealment of birth in the local Magistrate's Court. Tregear advocated for parenting education in this context.

== See also ==
- Minnie Dean
- Phoebe Veitch
- Caroline Whitting
- Lillian Fanny Jane Hobbs
- Winifred Carrick
- Sarah-Jane and Anna Flannagan
- Capital punishment in New Zealand
- John and Sarah Makin
- Frances Lydia Alice Knorr
- Amelia Dyer
