= Alf Hanlon =

New Zealand lawyer (1866–1944)

Alf Hanlon KC
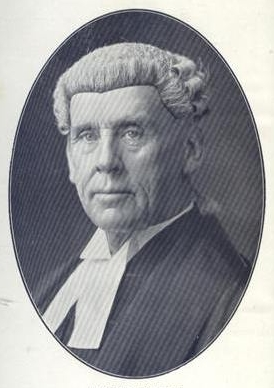
- Born: Alfred Charles Hanlon; 1 August 1866; Dunedin, New Zealand
- Died: 6 February 1944 (aged 77); Dunedin, New Zealand
- Resting place: Andersons Bay Cemetery; 45°54′17.03″S 170°31′58.13″E (row)
- Occupation: Lawyer
- Employers: J. A. D. Adams (1882–1888); Himself (1888–post 1930)
- Known for: Representing Minnie Dean
- Spouse: Mary Ann "Polly" Hudson (m. 1894; died 1940)
- Children: 2 daughters, 1 son

Alfred Charles Hanlon KC (1 August 1866 – 6 February 1944) was a New Zealand lawyer, who, according to the Dictionary of New Zealand Biography, "was one of the most outstanding criminal advocates in New Zealand's history". He was born in Dunedin, New Zealand, where he lived and died, though he represented clients nationwide. Hanlon represented at least 16 people charged with murder, but he is best known for his first defence case, in which he represented the only woman to be hanged in New Zealand, Minnie Dean. Dean was the only murder defendant of Hanlon's to be hanged.

Hanlon's career was the subject of a 1985 New Zealand television drama series, called Hanlon. The series was a critical and a commercial success, and was nominated for Best Overseas Program at the 1986 Emmy Awards. Its first episode, In Defence of Minnie Dean, "contributed to a re-evaluation of Dean's conviction", and won the Best Director, Best Drama Programme, Drama Script, and Performance, Female, in a Dramatic Role categories at the 1986 Listener Television Awards (also called the GOFTA Awards). David Gwillim, who played Hanlon, won Best Performance, Male, in a Dramatic Role at the awards for his performance in the series, and Terry Gray's music won Best Original Music.
