= Minnie Dean =

New Zealander convicted of infanticide (1844–1895)

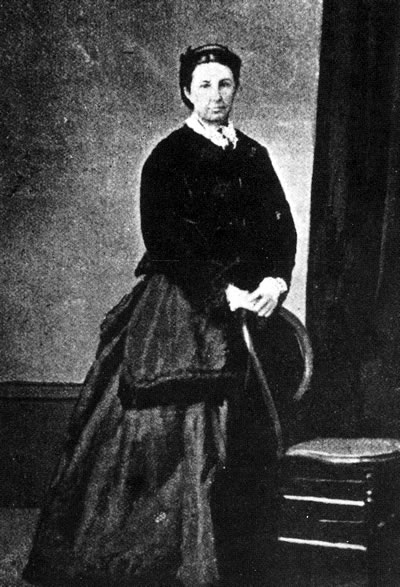
- Minnie Dean at the time of her marriage in 1873
- Born: 2 September 1844; Greenock, Renfrewshire, Scotland, United Kingdom
- Died: 12 August 1895 (aged 50); Invercargill, New Zealand
- Cause of death: Execution by hanging
- Resting place: Winton Cemetery; 46°07.702′S 168°19.529′E
- Status: Executed
- Conviction: Murder (1895)
- Penalty: Death by hanging

Williamina Dean (née McCulloch; 2 September 1844 – 12 August 1895) was a New Zealander who was found guilty of infanticide and hanged. She was the first and only woman to have been executed in New Zealand. Several other women have been sentenced to death in New Zealand, but all of them had their sentences commuted to either life imprisonment or a long imprisonment.

== Early life ==
Minnie McCulloch was born on 2 September 1844 in Greenock, Renfrewshire, Scotland. Her father, John McCulloch, was a railway engineer. Her mother, Elizabeth Swan, died of cancer in 1857. It is unknown when she arrived in New Zealand, but by the early-1860s, she was living in Invercargill with two young children. She claimed she was the widow of a Tasmanian doctor, although no evidence of a marriage has been found. She was still using her birth name, McCulloch.

In 1872, she married an innkeeper named Charles Dean. The two lived in Etal Creek, between Ohai and Lumsden, then an important stop on the route from Riverton to the Otago goldfields. When the gold rush died down, the couple turned to farming, but were soon in dire financial straits and her husband went bankrupt in 1884.

The family moved to Winton, where Charles Dean took up pig farming while Minnie began to earn money by baby-farming: taking in unwanted children in exchange for payment. Dean saw success in the business, housing as many as nine young children at any time. She received payment either weekly or in a lump sum.

Infant mortality was a significant problem in New Zealand at this time (as it was estimated to run to about 80 to 100 infants out of 1,000 colonial births). As such, a number of children under Dean's care died of various illnesses. In March 1889, a six-month-old child had died of convulsions; in October 1891, a six-week-old baby had perished from cardiovascular and respiratory ailments; and a boy allegedly drowned under her care in 1894 and she hid the body in her garden, arousing further suspicions. A coroner's inquest was held, and Dean was not held responsible for the deaths, due to universally-poor hygiene standards, even at childbirth itself. Nevertheless, the community came to mistrust Dean, and rumours of mistreatment circulated. Additionally, children under Dean's care allegedly went missing without explanation. In the public's mind, this linked Dean to cases of infanticide or baby farming in the United Kingdom and Australia, where women killed children under their care to avoid having to support them. At the time, lax childcare legislation meant that Dean did not have to keep records of the children she agreed to take in, so proving that the children had disappeared was difficult.

Before Dean's trial and execution, four other women had been tried and sentenced to death--Caroline Whitting (found guilty in 1872), Phoebe Veitch (1883), and Sarah-Jane and Anna Flannagan (1891). In each case, these sentences were commuted to life imprisonment; in each case, child murder was the culpable offence. 30 years later, in 1926, Daniel Cooper was also convicted of baby farming and executed for the offence, although his second wife Martha was acquitted. In a broader, international context, Dean's misdeeds may also have been viewed in the same light as late Victorian contemporaries and fellow "baby farmers" such as Amelia Dyer in the United Kingdom (convicted in 1896) and John and Sarah Makin (1893) and Frances Lydia Alice Knorr in New South Wales (1893), as well as previous New Zealand historical instances of ostensibly deliberate child deaths. Certainly, given the proximity of New South Wales, the Makin case featured in New Zealand newspapers during the same period as the Minnie Dean controversy and trial.

== Murder case and execution ==
On 2 May 1895, Dean was observed boarding a train in Winton carrying a young baby and a hatbox, but was later observed departing at Lumsden without the baby and with only the hatbox. As railway porters later testified, the hatbox was suspiciously heavy. A woman, Jane Hornsby, came forward claiming to have given her granddaughter, Eva, to Dean, and clothes identified as belonging to this child were found at Dean's residence, but Dean could not produce the child herself. A search along the railway line found no sign of the child. Dean was arrested on 9 May 1895, and charged with murder. Her garden was dug up, and three bodies (two of babies, and one of a boy estimated to be three years old) were uncovered. An inquest found that one child (Eva) had died of suffocation and one, later identified as one-year-old Dorothy Edith Carter, had died from an overdose of laudanum (used on children to sedate them). The cause of death for the third child was not determined. Dean was charged with their murder.

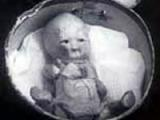
Hatboxes containing baby dolls, such as this one, were sold outside the courthouse during Minnie Dean's 1895 trial

At her trial, Dean's lawyer Alfred Hanlon argued that all deaths were accidental, and that they had been covered up to prevent adverse publicity of the sort that Dean had previously received. On 21 June 1895, Dean was found guilty of Dorothy Carter's murder, and sentenced to death. Between June and August 1895, Dean wrote her own account of her life. Altogether, she claimed to have cared for 28 children. Of these, five were in good health when her establishment was raided, six had died whilst under her care, and one had been reclaimed by her parents. Apart from her two adopted daughters, that left fourteen or so children unaccounted for, according to her own record. The police and the public believed that the missing children were murdered.

On 12 August, she was hanged by the official executioner, Tom Long, at the old Invercargill gaol at the intersection of Spey and Leven streets. Upon being asked if she had anything left to say, Dean replied "No, I have nothing to say, except that I am innocent." She is the only woman ever judicially executed in New Zealand. She is buried in Winton, alongside her husband, who died in a house fire in 1908. Her crimes led to the Infant Life Protection Act 1893 and the Infant Protection Act 1896.

== In popular culture ==
In 1985, Dean's trial was the subject of "In Defence of Minnie Dean", the first episode of the Emmy-nominated Hanlon, a New Zealand television drama series about the career of Dean's lawyer. The episode won the Best Director, Best Drama Programme, Drama Script, and Performance, Female, in a Dramatic Role categories at the 1986 Listener Television Awards (also called the GOFTA Awards), and "contributed to a re-evaluation of Dean's conviction".

Minnie Dean is referenced in Dudley Benson's 2006 song "It's Akaroa's Fault" ("I don't want to meet Minnie Dean at the end of my life/If I were to meet her I'd keep her hatbox in sight"). Authors Lynley Hood and John Rawle wrote posthumous accounts and reconstructions of the case as the centenary of her apprehension and execution occurred, in 1995.

On 30 January 2009, the Otago Daily Times reported that a headstone had appeared mysteriously on Dean's grave. The headstone reads "Minnie Dean is part of Winton's history Where she now lies is now no mystery". It is unknown who placed the headstone there. Her family had been considering it but claimed that this was not their doing. In February 2009, the family laid a headstone to honour Dean and her husband's grave. It was unveiled in a traditional Māori ceremony, the Hura Kohatu.

At the 2012 Edinburgh Fringe Festival, Southland-based group Invers Theatre Company debuted their play titled A Cry Too Far From Heaven, which featured Minnie Dean on her last night before execution.

In 2013, the New Zealand musician Marlon Williams wrote a song inspired by Minnie's case, entitled "Ballad of Minnie Dean".

== See also ==
- Winifred Carrick and Lillian Fanny Jane Hobbs, acquitted of child murder in New Zealand
- Infanticide in Nineteenth Century New Zealand

== Bibliography ==
- Lynley Hood: Minnie Dean: Her Life and Crimes: Auckland: Penguin: 1994: ISBN 0-14-016763-3
- John Rawle: Minnie Dean: One Hundred Years of Memory: Christchurch: Orca Publishing: 1997: ISBN 1-877162-03-5
