= Walter James Bolton =

New Zealand farmer and murderer (1888–1957)

Walter Bolton
- Born: 13 August 1888; Wanganui, New Zealand
- Died: 18 February 1957 (aged 68); Mount Eden Prison, New Zealand
- Occupation: Farmer
- Spouse: Beatrice Mabel Jones
- Children: 1
- Status: Executed by hanging
- Conviction: Murder
- Penalty: Death

Walter James Bolton (13 August 1888 – 18 February 1957) was a New Zealand farmer who was found guilty of poisoning his wife. He is known as the last person to be executed in New Zealand before the abolition of capital punishment.

Bolton was born in Wanganui and grew up in nearby Mangamahu. He married Beatrice Mabel Jones in 1913, but Beatrice died on 11 July 1956 after a long and debilitating illness. An autopsy found traces of arsenic in her body, and a police investigation was launched. Bolton was formally charged with her murder in September.

Bolton made several statements to the police that would not be shared with the jury. Bolton said he suffered from erectile dysfunction and that this affected the relationship he had with Beatrice's sister, Florence Doughty. He also said Doughty had seduced him on at least one occasion.

The prosecution claimed that Bolton was having an affair with Doughty, who had moved in to help look after Beatrice, and that Bolton had poisoned his wife with arsenic he possessed for use on his farm. It also alleged that he and Florence had destroyed Beatrice's diary. Bolton's defence argued that Beatrice could have been poisoned accidentally, by arsenic entering the water supply. Water on the Bolton's farm was tested and found to contain arsenic, and traces of arsenic were also found in Bolton and one of his daughters.

Nevertheless, the jury quickly convicted Bolton of murder, and he was sentenced to death. He was hanged at Mount Eden Prison in Auckland on 18 February 1957, aged 68. According to a contemporary newspaper account, his execution was allegedly botched – instead of breaking his neck instantly, he was slowly strangled to death.

Shortly afterward, the New Zealand Labour Party won the 1957 New Zealand General Election and in effect, the practice of capital punishment ended with Bolton's execution. The death penalty faced statutory abolition for homicide and most other crimes when Parliament passed the Crimes Act 1961. (The last vestiges of the death penalty in New Zealand – for treason and similar acts – were abolished with the passage of the Abolition of the Death Penalty Act 1989).

In the parliamentary debate on the death penalty in 1961 the Bolton case was referred to (without naming him) by two Labour MPs, Walter Nash and Fred Hackett, as an executed murderer whose guilt was doubted by counsel, his doctor and the clergyman who officiated at the execution.

In recent times, there has been speculation as to whether Bolton was guilty. His son, James Bolton, has attempted to clear his father's name. Sherwood Young dealt with the issue in his history of capital punishment in New Zealand in 1998.

== See also ==
- Capital punishment in New Zealand
- List of people executed in New Zealand
