= Edward Tarrant (murderer) =

Executed New Zealand murderer

Walter Edward Tarrant
- Born: 1874; Australia
- Died: 6 March 1933 (aged 58–59); Mount Crawford Prison, Wellington, New Zealand
- Cause of death: Execution by hanging
- Resting place: Karori Cemetery, Wellington, New Zealand; 41°16.501′S 174°45.054′E
- Other name: Edward Tarrant
- Occupations: lumberman and fencer
- Spouse: Eugenie Anne Tarrant
- Status: Executed
- Conviction: Murder
- Penalty: Death

Edward Tarrant was a New Zealand axeman who was the 73rd person to be hanged in New Zealand. He was convicted of the murder of James Flood in the South Island town of Picton.

== Biography ==
Walter Edward Tarrant was an Australian-born wood merchant who resided in the town of Picton with his wife and children. He was married to a woman named Eugenie Anne and had at least five children during his marriage. On 3 November 1931 the property of local resident James Flood was searched after Flood had not been accountable for some days. He was found on his back in front of his fireplace with large wounds to the neck. These were later found to have been committed by an axe and likely to have been swung by a left-handed assailant. James Flood was 76 and a bachelor who had been living quietly out of a small cottage in Canterbury Street when the crime was committed. He was a native of Port Underwood and had obtained considerable savings through farming alongside his brother Joseph and Jerome on what was his parents' property known as Starmount. Flood was known to keep large sums of money on his persons and that he had a custom-made pocket attached to the inside of his coat for his wallet. Coroners reports showed that Flood had sustained three blows from an axe. One had struck the rear of his head which was followed by two heavy blows at the back of his head, severing his spinal column with either causing death. The blows were so deep they nearly severed Flood's head from his body. The key for Flood's home was soon located by the grounds keeper for the Picton Croquet Club when it was found on the green and handed in to police.

In June 1932 Tarrant was intercepted at Blenheim after a report by a local business stated he paid for items with old English banknotes in large denominations. These types of banknotes were suggested to be the type that James Flood had kept his savings in. After a false pocket was discovered containing notes that fit the description on his person, Tarrant was arrested and charged with Flood's murder. The case gained widespread interest after the skull of James Flood was used as evidence during the court proceedings in the case against Edward Tarrant. Its appearance was described as;

I remember that the lower jaw was held in place by a small brass coil spring either side, looped over brass dowels inserted in the upper and lower jaws. The skull dome had been sawn right around and could be lifted off like a cap and was located by brass dowels.

— Kenneth. M. Fairweather, "Exhibit A", Sounds Picnic: Old Marlborough Tales (1990)

Tarrant was known to be a skilled left-handed axeman making him a prime suspect prior to the discovery of the banknotes on his person. Detectives discovered that upon throwing the keys of James Flood's home from the Tarrant property, they landed almost exactly where they had been found by the Croquet Clubs groundskeeper. Tarrant was known to have befriended Flood and had spent time with him at a property in the Boons Valley, Waikawa On 29 November 1932 Tarrant was found guilty of murder by Hon. Justice Blair and sentenced to death. After staring blankly at the jury's findings he replied "I never did it". Tarrant was hanged at Wellington's Mount Crawford Prison on the 6 March 1933 a few minutes before 8 o'clock. His final words were "Nothing", in response to Sherriff W. W. Samson asking if he had anything final to say. He was buried at Karori Cemetery's catholic section in an unmarked grave. James Flood was buried at Picton Cemetery with a headstone that read "Murdered by Edward Tarrant". Due to descendants of Tarrant still residing in the area, it was decided to replace the inscription with "Murdered in Picton".
