= Capital punishment in the Cook Islands =

Capital punishment in the Cook Islands was part of its legal system until the penalty was abolished in 2007, though no-one was ever executed.

The death penalty applied in the Cook Islands under New Zealand colonial rule. A death sentence was mandatory for treason and for murder under the Cook Islands Act 1915, which governed the Cook Islands and Niue. The method of execution was to be hanging. When New Zealand abolished the death penalty for murder from 1941 to 1949, the abolition did not extend to the Cook Islands. When the government of Niue was split from the Cook Islands in 1957, the use of the death penalty was reaffirmed, and provision was made for executions to be carried out in New Zealand.

In October 1956 Rima Kurariki was convicted of murder and sentenced to death. The sentence was commuted to life imprisonment in 1957.

New Zealand abolished the death penalty for murder again in 1961, and the abolition was extended to the Cook Islands in 1962. Subsequent to the Cook Islands becoming self-governing in free association with New Zealand in 1965, it reaffirmed the death penalty for treason in section 76 of the Crimes Act 1969. This was defined as participation in a war against the Cook Islands or New Zealand, an attempt to overthrow the Cook Islands government, or an attempt to harm the Queen of New Zealand. The laws regarding capital punishment were based on New Zealand law at the time. Further provisions for the death penalty were enacted in the Criminal Procedure Act 1980-1981.

The Cook Islands abolished the death penalty entirely in November 2007 with the Crimes Amendment Act, without anyone ever being executed.

== See also ==
- Capital punishment in New Zealand
