= Hanlon (TV series) =

- Written by: Ken Catran
- Directed by: Wayne Tourell
- Composer: Terry Gray
- Country of origin: New Zealand
- Original language: English
- No. of seasons: 1
- No. of episodes: 7

Production
- Executive producer: John McRae
- Producer: Lex van Os
- Editor: Ghris Gurr
- Running time: 90 minutes (ep 1) 50 minutes (2-7)

Original release
- Release: July 21 – September 1, 1985

Hanlon is a 1985 New Zealand television series about Dunedin lawyer Alf Hanlon, covering his life from 1895 to 1914, looking at his private life and some of the trials he worked. Produced by Lex van Os, it began on 21 July running until 1 September. It was written by Ken Catran and starred David Gwillim as Hanlon.

Ken Strongman of the Press wrote of the first episode "The overriding impression is of authenticity. Everyting (sic) looks and sounds so right that one can almost smell the grand steam trains chugging into Lumsden."

== Cast ==
- David Gwillim as Alf Hanlon
- Sylvia Rands as Polly Hanlon
- Ken Blackburn as J F M Fraser
- Michael McGrath as Claude White
- Alma Woods as Mrs Hudson
- Bruce Allpress as Justice Williams
- Philip Holder as Joe Hanan
- Robyn Nevin as Minnie Dean
- Marshall Napier as Sweeny
- Frank Whitten as Charles Clements
- Jeremy Stephens as Captain Kerry
- Michael Watson as Stott
- Freddie Hemara as Bromley
- Peter Brunt as Shue Hock

== Episodes ==
1. In Defence of Minnie Dean
2. In Defence of Hugh Sweeney
3. In Defence of Charles Clements
4. In Defence of Thomas Caradoc Kerry
5. In Defence of Stott and Bromley
6. In Defence of Shue Hock
7. Hanlon - In Defence

== Awards ==
1986 International Emmy Awards

- Best Overseas Drama - nominated

1986 GOFTA Awards

- Best Drama Programme: Hanlon, "In Defence of Minnie Dean" (Episode One), Lex van Os - won
- Director: Wayne Tourell for Hanlon, "In Defence of Minnie Dean" - won
- Drama Drama Script: Ken Catran for Hanlon, "In Defence of Minnie Dean" - won
- Female Performance in a Dramatic Role: Robyn Nevin for Minnie Dean in Hanlon- won
- Male Performance in a Dramatic Role: David Gwillim for Alf Hanlon in Hanlon - won
- Original Music: Terry Gray - won
- Best Drama Programme: Hanlon "In Defence of Shue Hock" (Episode Six) - nominated
