= Jack Gwillim =

English actor (1909–2001)

- As Poseidon in Clash of the Titans (1981)
- Born: Jack William Frederick Gwillim; 15 December 1909; Canterbury, Kent, England
- Died: 2 July 2001 (aged 91); Los Angeles, California, US
- Burial place: Albany Rural Cemetery
- Education: Royal Central School of Speech and Drama
- Occupation: Actor
- Years active: 1953–2001
- Spouse(s): Peggy Ballard (m. 1943; died 1958) Olivia Selby (m. 1969)
- Children: 3, including Sarah-Jane,Jaxon Duff Gwillim and David Gwillim

Jack William Frederick Gwillim (15 December 1909 – 2 July 2001) was an English character actor.

== Career ==
Born in Canterbury, Kent, he joined the Royal Navy at 17 and served for over twenty years. During his time in the Navy, he became a champion boxer and rugby player, and was invalided out in 1946. After training at Central School of Speech and Drama, Gwillim began his acting career in earnest in the 1950s, working on both stage and screen. On stage, he appeared both at the Shakespeare Memorial Theatre in Stratford and at the Old Vic. He performed in an extensive amount of theatre, both classics and modern plays, in the West End of London and on Broadway.

Some of his most notable roles include: playing in Ralph Richardson's production of The Merchant of Venice; The Right Honourable Gentleman with lifelong friend Anthony Quayle; a revival of My Fair Lady with Rex Harrison, playing Colonel Pickering; John Gielgud's The Constant Wife, with Ingrid Bergman; and The Iceman Cometh, with James Earl Jones.

Gwillim also featured in over fifty films and television series, usually war films or historical epics. His military background, commanding presence and deep, booming voice typecast him as soldiers and authority figures. Some of his most notable roles include playing a warship captain in Sink the Bismarck! (1960), the archbishop Hubert Walter in Sword of Sherwood Forest (1960), the obnoxious club secretary in Lawrence of Arabia (1962), King Aeëtes in Jason and the Argonauts (1963), an RAF officer in the James Bond film Thunderball (1965), the Lord Chief Justice in A Man for All Seasons (1966), General Harold Alexander in Patton (1970), Poseidon in Clash of the Titans (1981), and Van Helsing in The Monster Squad (1987). He also had a recurring role on the TV series Danger Man, The Saint, and The Troubleshooters.

He also appeared in The Avengers (1967) in the episode "The Hidden Tiger" as Sir David Harper.

He took part in a number of recordings for Caedmon Shakespeare Records.

== Personal life ==
Gwillim was twice married: to Peggy Ballard, until 1958, and Olivia Selby, from 1969 until his death. He had two children from his first marriage, Sarah-Jane Gwillim and David Gwillim, and a third, Jaxon Duff Gwillim, from his second marriage. His children also became actors, and he acted onstage with them in 1995 in a production of On Borrowed Time, which was his last on stage performance.

== Death ==
Gwillim died in Los Angeles, California, on 2 July 2001, at the age of 91. He is buried in Lot 136, Section 15 of Albany Rural Cemetery in upstate New York.

== Filmography ==
- The Battle of the River Plate (1956) – Captain Parry – H.M.N.Z.S. Achilles
- The One That Got Away (1957) – Commandant Grizedale
- A Midsummer Night's Dream (1959) – Oberon (voice)
- North West Frontier (1959) – Brigadier Ames
- Solomon and Sheba (1959) – Josiah
- Sink the Bismarck! (1960) – Captain (King George V)
- Let's Get Married (1960) – Dr. Sanders
- Circus of Horrors (1960) – Supt. Andrews
- Oscar Wilde (1960) – Barrister
- Sword of Sherwood Forest (1960) – Archbishop of Canterbury Hubert Walter
- Sentenced for Life (1960) – John Richards
- No Love for Johnnie (1961) – MP (uncredited)
- Lisa (1962) – Insp. Cobb
- In Search of the Castaways (1962) – Captain Grant
- Lawrence of Arabia (1962) – Club Secretary
- Heart to Heart (1962) – Controller of Programmes
- Sammy Going South (1963) – District Commissioner
- Jason and the Argonauts (1963) – King Aeëtes
- The World Ten Times Over (1963) – Bolton
- The Curse of the Mummy's Tomb (1964) – Sir Giles Dalrymple
- The Rivals (1964) – Rolf Neilson
- Thunderball (1965) – Senior RAF Staff Officer (uncredited)
- Kiss the Girls and Make Them Die (1966) – British ambassador
- A Man for All Seasons (1966) – Chief Justice
- Casino Royale (1967) – British Officer at Auction (uncredited)
- The Bushbaby (1969) – Ardsley
- Battle of Britain (1969) – Senior Air Staff Officer
- Patton (1970) – General Sir Harold Alexander
- Cromwell (1970) – General Byron
- The Adams Chronicles (1976, TV mini-series) – Lord Carmarthen
- Clash of the Titans (1981) – Poseidon
- Sicilian Connection (1987) – (voice)
- Blind Date (1987) – Artist
- The Monster Squad (1987) – Abraham Van Helsing
- Blue Shark Hash (2001) – Jonah (final film role)
