= Sarah-Jane Gwillim =

British actress

Sarah-Jane Gwillim is a British television and stage actress who worked mainly from the mid-1960s until the 1980s. She now teaches as an Assistant Professor of Acting at the University of Michigan.

== Brief career ==
She was part of the repertory company at Nottingham Playhouse in 1966 and starred in the short lived ABC series Sat'day While Sunday (1967) opposite Malcolm McDowell and Timothy Dalton. She also appeared in the 1970 television version of Howards End, opposite Glenda Jackson.

She appeared on Broadway in the 1980s in revivals of such classics as Macbeth, Major Barbara and Saint Joan.

== Family ==
She married stage actor Philip Kerr in 1983 and has two children, Emma and Caroline. Her father Jack Gwillim, was also an actor, as are her brothers, David Gwillim and Jaxon Duff Gwillim.
