= Annie Smyth =

Annie Smyth (1878–1942) was a notable New Zealand Salvation Army officer and missionary to Japan. She was born in Kaiwharawhara, Wellington, New Zealand in 1878. She was murdered in Wairoa, along with her sister Rosamond, by Leo Hannan, a self-confessed serial killer.
