= Waipapakauri =

- Interactive map of Waipapakauri
- Coordinates: 35°01′30″S 173°13′30″E
- Country: New Zealand
- Region: Northland Region
- District: Far North District
- Ward: Te Hiku
- Community: Te Hiku
- Subdivision: North Cape
- Electorates: Northland; Te Tai Tokerau

Government
  - Territorial Authority: Far North District Council
  - Regional council: Northland Regional Council
  - Mayor of Far North: Moko Tepania
  - Northland MP: Grant McCallum
  - Te Tai Tokerau MP: Mariameno Kapa-Kingi

Area
  - Total: 9.63 km^{2} (3.72 sq mi)

Population (2023 census)
  - Total: 225
  - Density: 23.4/km^{2} (60.5/sq mi)

Waipapakauri is a small settlement in the Far North District of New Zealand. It is located on State Highway 1 at the isthmus of the Aupouri Peninsula. The larger settlement of Awanui lies to the southeast. Waipapakauri is some 12 kilometres to the north of Kaitaia, the nearest town.

The small Waipapakauri Creek crosses SH1 just to the east, flowing north to reach the broad mudflats of Rangaunu Harbour. Several small lakes lie to the southwest of the settlement, the largest of them being Lake Ngatu. Waipapakauri is located close to Ninety Mile Beach and has long beek known for shellfish harvesting. Flax milling was also formerly carried out at Waipapakauri. The settlement was the site of an airforce base, RNZAF Station Waipapakauri, during World War II. There is a memorial site at Waipapakauri for the base.

The name Waipapakauri is Māori for "Swamp where the kauri grow".

The Waipapakauri Hotel on State Highway 1 is a Category 2 Historic Place. The current single story building (formally called the Commercial Hotel) replaced a two-story hotel which was demolished in 1926.

== History ==
Waipapakauri was an important location for the late 19th/early 20th century kauri gum digging trade. In the 1910s, the lower quality chip gum found at the southern half of the Aupōuri Peninsula greatly increased in value.

== Demographics ==
The SA1 statistical area which includes Waipapakauri covers 9.63 km^{2} (3.72 sq mi). The SA1 area is part of the larger Rangaunu Harbour statistical area.

Historical population
| Year | Pop. | ±% p.a. |
|---|---|---|
| 2006 | 168 | — |
| 2013 | 168 | +0.00% |
| 2018 | 186 | +2.06% |
| 2023 | 225 | +3.88% |

The SA1 statistical area had a population of 225 in the 2023 New Zealand census, an increase of 39 people (21.0%) since the 2018 census, and an increase of 57 people (33.9%) since the 2013 census. There were 117 males, 105 females and 3 people of other genders in 69 dwellings. 4.0% of people identified as LGBTIQ+. The median age was 37.8 years (compared with 38.1 years nationally). There were 57 people (25.3%) aged under 15 years, 36 (16.0%) aged 15 to 29, 99 (44.0%) aged 30 to 64, and 30 (13.3%) aged 65 or older.

People could identify as more than one ethnicity. The results were 58.7% European (Pākehā), 65.3% Māori, 5.3% Pasifika, and 4.0% Asian. English was spoken by 94.7%, Māori language by 21.3%, and other languages by 5.3%. No language could be spoken by 2.7% (e.g. too young to talk). New Zealand Sign Language was known by 1.3%. The percentage of people born overseas was 10.7, compared with 28.8% nationally.

Religious affiliations were 36.0% Christian, and 5.3% Māori religious beliefs. People who answered that they had no religion were 50.7%, and 6.7% of people did not answer the census question.

Of those at least 15 years old, 21 (12.5%) people had a bachelor's or higher degree, 108 (64.3%) had a post-high school certificate or diploma, and 48 (28.6%) people exclusively held high school qualifications. The median income was $32,300, compared with $41,500 nationally. 3 people (1.8%) earned over $100,000 compared to 12.1% nationally. The employment status of those at least 15 was that 84 (50.0%) people were employed full-time, 18 (10.7%) were part-time, and 9 (5.4%) were unemployed.

Noted people connected with Waipapakauri include former All Blacks Percy Erceg (who was born in the settlement), Peter Jones (who spent his last years there), former MP John Carter is a resident of Waipapakauri and Edward Te Whiu, 82nd person to be judicially executed in New Zealand.

== Climate ==
Climate data for Aupouri Forest (1971–2000)
| Month | Jan | Feb | Mar | Apr | May | Jun | Jul | Aug | Sep | Oct | Nov | Dec | Year |
|---|---|---|---|---|---|---|---|---|---|---|---|---|---|
| Mean daily maximum °C (°F) | 23.2 (73.8) | 23.8 (74.8) | 22.8 (73.0) | 20.6 (69.1) | 18.4 (65.1) | 16.4 (61.5) | 15.6 (60.1) | 15.8 (60.4) | 16.5 (61.7) | 17.8 (64.0) | 19.3 (66.7) | 21.3 (70.3) | 19.3 (66.7) |
| Daily mean °C (°F) | 19.7 (67.5) | 20.1 (68.2) | 19.2 (66.6) | 17.4 (63.3) | 15.4 (59.7) | 13.6 (56.5) | 12.6 (54.7) | 12.7 (54.9) | 13.4 (56.1) | 14.7 (58.5) | 16.2 (61.2) | 17.9 (64.2) | 16.1 (61.0) |
| Mean daily minimum °C (°F) | 16.2 (61.2) | 16.5 (61.7) | 15.6 (60.1) | 14.1 (57.4) | 12.3 (54.1) | 10.7 (51.3) | 9.5 (49.1) | 9.6 (49.3) | 10.4 (50.7) | 11.7 (53.1) | 13.0 (55.4) | 14.5 (58.1) | 12.8 (55.1) |
| Average rainfall mm (inches) | 82.2 (3.24) | 77.0 (3.03) | 73.5 (2.89) | 107.0 (4.21) | 87.0 (3.43) | 140.4 (5.53) | 126.1 (4.96) | 116.1 (4.57) | 99.0 (3.90) | 87.9 (3.46) | 77.0 (3.03) | 71.6 (2.82) | 1,144.8 (45.07) |
Source: NIWA

== Education ==
A school opened in Waipapakauri in 1906 and was still in existence in 1971.
