= Capital punishment in New Zealand =

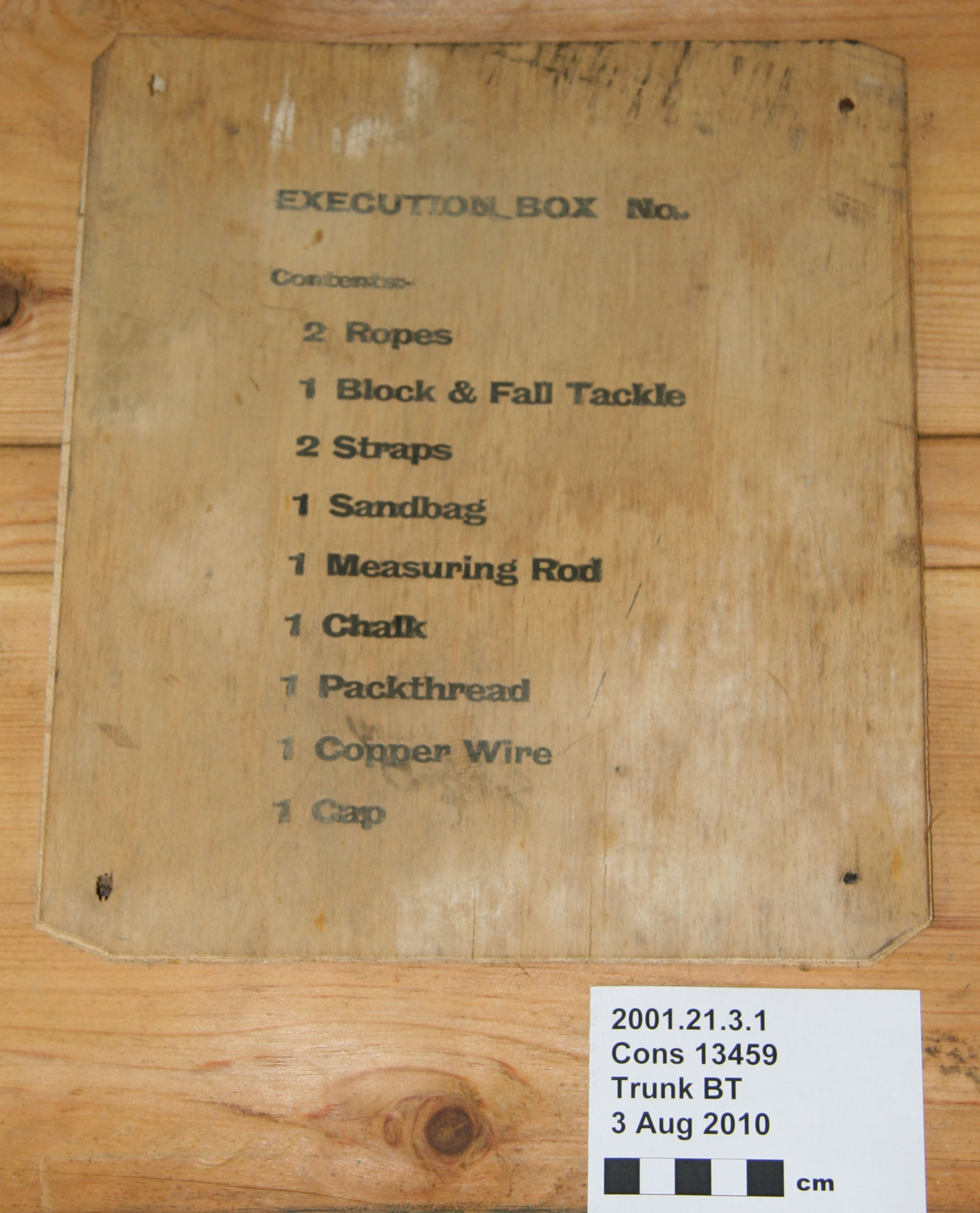
Execution box from the collection of the Auckland War Memorial Museum

Capital punishment – the sentencing of convicted offenders to death for the most serious crimes (capital crimes) and carrying out the sentence, as ordered by a legal system – first appeared in New Zealand in a codified form when New Zealand became a British colony in 1840. It was first carried out with a public hanging in Victoria Street, Auckland, in 1842. The last execution took place in 1957 at Mount Eden Prison in Auckland. In total, 85 people have been lawfully executed in New Zealand.

Capital punishment was first abolished for murder in 1941 by the First Labour Government, with all death sentences commuted to life imprisonment. However, the succeeding First National Government reinstated it in 1949, with eight more executions taking place between then and 1957. Subsequently, public opinion turned against the use of capital punishment, and it was once again abolished for murder in 1961, and then abolished for all crimes, including treason, in 1989.

== Method ==
The method of execution was always by hanging. At first, there were many possible execution sites all around the country, but later, the only two cities where hangings were carried out were Wellington (the capital) and Auckland (now the largest city).

Initially, there was no professional hangman employed—the executioner was simply chosen from among any who were deemed qualified. On occasion, convicted criminals were employed as hangmen, often in exchange for reduced sentences or monetary reward. In 1877, the sheriff of Blenheim recommended that a professional executioner be hired. Tom Long, an Irishman who claimed to have been an executioner in Australia, was hired as the official hangman. He was the only official hangman to be publicly known; others remained anonymous.

== History ==
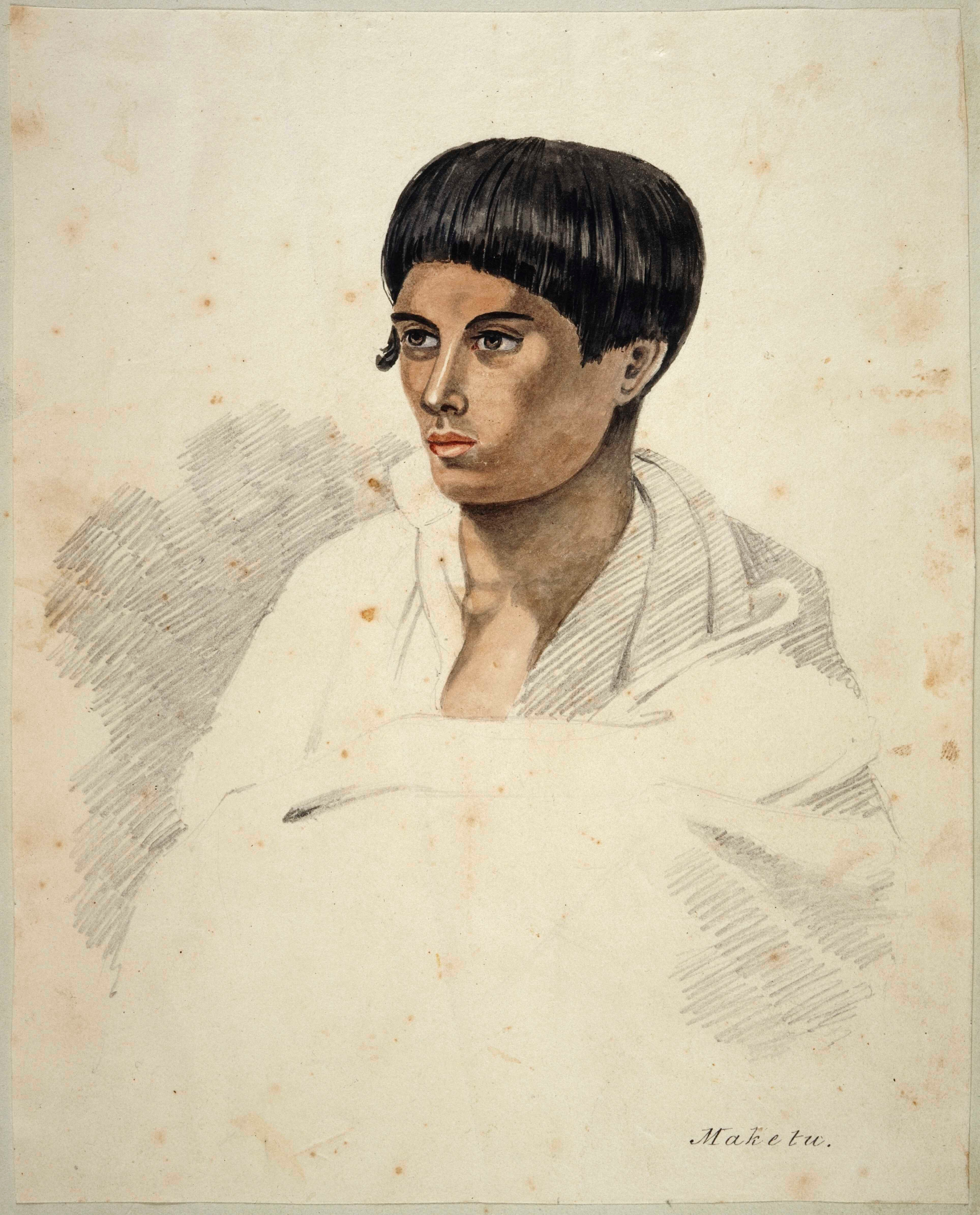
Drawing of Maketū, the first person formally executed in New Zealand

When the Treaty of Waitangi was signed and New Zealand became a British colony in 1840, the latest legislation governing capital punishment in England, and henceforth New Zealand, was the Punishment of Offences Act (1837), which had abolished the death penalty for a number of statutory offences, including cattle stealing, and replaced it with penal transportation for life. However, some capital crimes remained on the British law books, including murder, treason, espionage, arson in the royal dockyards, and piracy with violence.

All those executed in New Zealand were convicted of murder, with the exception of Hamiora Pere, who was convicted of treason in 1869. All bar one were men, the exception being Minnie Dean, who was found guilty of infanticide in 1895. Before Dean's trial and execution, several other women had been found guilty of infanticide in nineteenth-century New Zealand, but had their death sentences commuted to life imprisonment. These were Caroline Whitting (1872), Phoebe Veitch (1883) and Sarah-Jane and Anna Flannagan (1891).

=== Public executions ===
The first eight executions were carried out in public, from 1842 to 1858; five outside the gate of the Auckland Gaol on the corner of Queen Street and Victoria Street West in central Auckland; one on King Edward Parade on the waterfront at Devonport; and two outside Mount Cook Gaol in Wellington, which is today the site of the Dominion Museum building and National War Memorial on Puke Ahu.

At the first execution, on 7 March 1842, approximately a thousand people gathered at the corner of Queen Street and Victoria Street West, now the centre of the Auckland CBD, to witness the hanging of Wiremu Kīngi Maketū. He had been found guilty of murdering five people on Motuarohia Island, in the Bay of Islands. He was sentenced to death by an all-white jury (his defence had wanted a half-white, half-Māori jury) in an Auckland court, and executed on 7 March 1842.

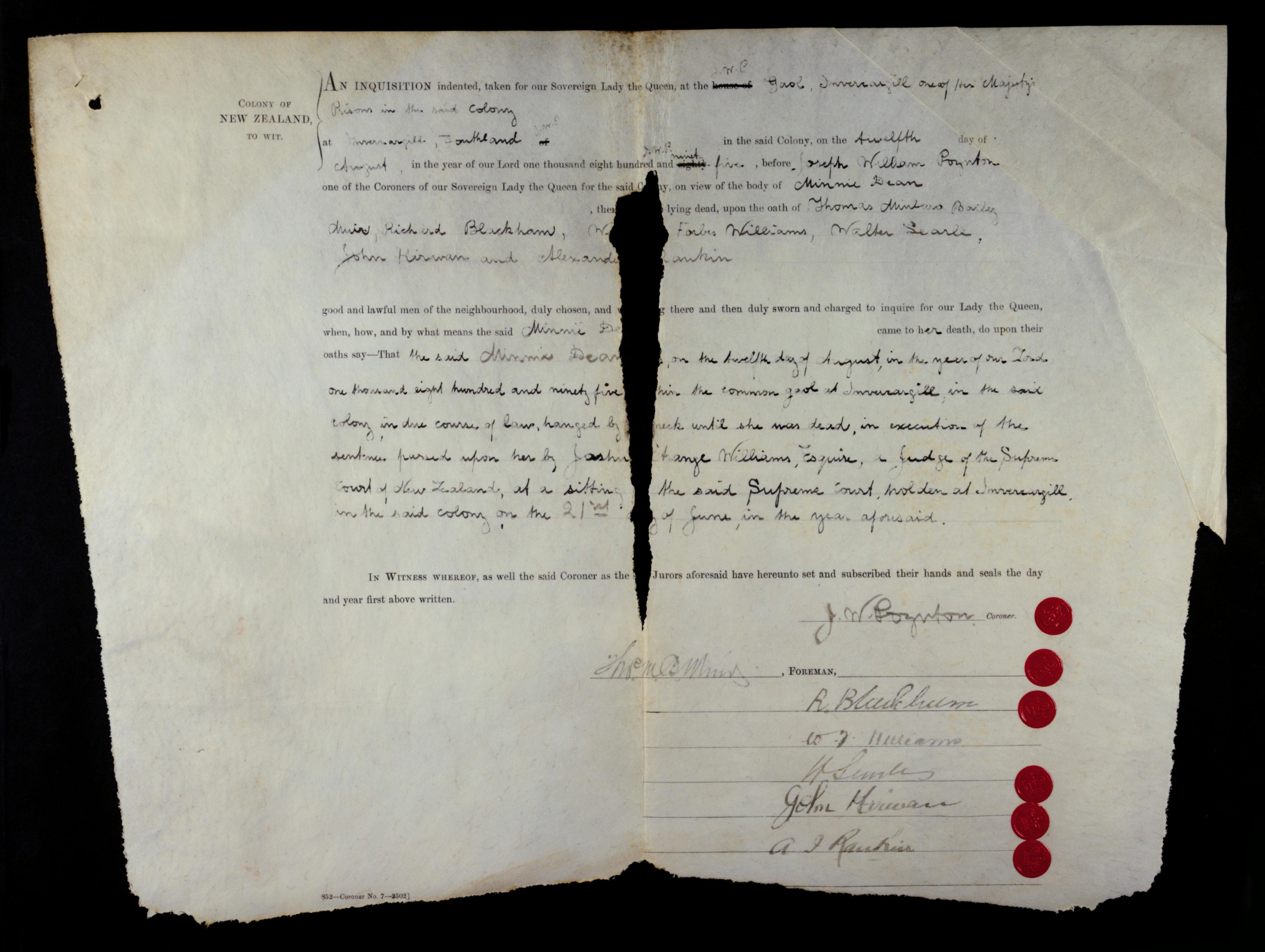
Death certificate of Minnie Dean. On 12 August 1895, Dean was hanged at Invercargill Gaol after being found guilty of infanticide, becoming the only woman ever to have been executed in New Zealand.

The second execution in New Zealand was the public hanging of Joseph Burns on 17 June 1848. On the day of his execution, he was paraded down Auckland's Queen St, seated in a coffin, and taken by boat across the Waitemata Harbour to the Devonport waterfront, where he was hanged on King Edward Parade, not far from the scene of his crimes. Burns was the first European settler to be executed in New Zealand.

The third execution in New Zealand, and first in Wellington, occurred on 19 April 1849. Maroro of Ngāti Kahungunu descent was hanged outside Mount Cook Gaol in front of approximately 500 people, following his conviction of the murder of John Branks and his three children.

The fourth execution occurred in the same location in Wellington on 17 June 1850, in front of a similar sized crowd, when William Good was hanged for the murder of John Ellis. The scaffold was "erected on Cook's Mount, immediately in front of the brick wall of the gaol."

The fifth execution was that of escaped Australian convict, William Bowden, on 27 April 1852. He was hanged on the scaffold erected outside the entrance gate of the Auckland Gaol, on the corner of Queen Street and Victoria Street West, in front of approximately 300 people.

The sixth execution in New Zealand, and the third public hanging to take place outside the Auckland Gaol on the corner of Queen and Victoria Streets was that of Charles Marsden on 12 February 1856. It took approximately 14 minutes for Marsden to die, with accusations that his execution was "clumsily performed".

The seventh execution took place in Auckland at sunrise on 11 July 1856 with the public hanging of John White. In a sign of changing attitudes to the spectacle of public executions, the Superintendent had ordered that the scaffold be erected after dark the previous evening, and the front of the scaffold, under the drop, be partially boarded up. Due to the early hour of the execution, no more than twenty to thirty people witnessed the event on the corner of Queen Street and Victoria Street West.

The last public execution was that of John Killey, who had been found guilty of murdering John Butler in Whangārei on 17 December 1857. At his later sentencing in Auckland, the judge, Sir George Alfred Arney, was "said to have been moved to tears" in passing sentence, while Killey "fell down in the dock in a fainting fit". He was hanged on 18 March 1858, also outside the gate of the Auckland Gaol.

=== Move to abolish public executions in the British colonies of Australasia ===
Throughout the British colonies of Australasia public hangings came to be seen as "barbarous spectacles". The last public hanging in Sydney took place outside Darlinghurst Gaol on 21 September 1852, in which local press noted disapprovingly the "extraordinary attendance of children, upon whose tender minds the shocking spectacle of a fellow creature dangling at the end of a rope, had no other more serious effect than that of eliciting from them three cheers for the hangman". New South Wales, where public executions were also "associated with the hated convict era", became the first of the British colonies in Australia to abolish public executions, when the Act to Regulate the Execution of Criminals 1855 (NSW) came into force on 10 January 1855.

Victoria and Tasmania followed shortly after with the Private Execution Act 1855 (Vic) and the Criminals' Execution Act 1855 (Tas) respectively. When the Moreton Bay settlement separated from NSW to become the self-governing colony of Queensland in 1859, the New South Wales legislation automatically applied.

While South Australia and Western Australia abolished public executions in 1858 and 1870 respectively, both colonies subsequently passed amendments which allowed for the hanging of capitally convicted Aboriginal Australians at the scene of their alleged crimes: the Act to Amend an Act to Regulate the Execution of Criminals 1861 (SA) and the Capital Punishment Amendment Act 1871 Amendment Act 1875 (WA).

In New Zealand, public executions were abolished under Section 1 of the Executions of Criminals Act 1858, which specified that executions had to be carried out "within the walls or the enclosed yard of some gaol, or within some other enclosed space". The Act came into force on 3 June 1858, three months after the country's last public hanging in central Auckland.

By way of comparison with other English-speaking countries which share an historical legacy of English common law, the last public execution in the United Kingdom was the hanging of Michael Barrett outside Newgate Prison in London on 26 May 1868, in front of a crowd of approximately 2000 people. Canada's last public execution occurred on 7 December 1869 when Nicholas Melady was hanged in front of "a few hundred spectators", outside the Huron County Gaol, now called the Huron Historic Gaol, in Goderich, Ontario. The last judicial execution carried out in public in the United States was the hanging of Rainey Bethea in a parking lot in Owensboro, Kentucky on 14 August 1936, in front of an estimated crowd of 20,000.

=== Executed out of public view ===
In 1862, in Wellington, James Collins became the first person in New Zealand to be executed out of public view.

In 1866, the site of the old Auckland Gaol was made ready for a temporary market. The Sheriff approved the removal of the graves of the five executed criminals, to respect "public decency". The bodies were reinterred in "a remote and unused spot" of the Symonds St Cemetery.

The last person to be executed was Walter James Bolton, for poisoning his wife, on 18 February 1957.

== Abolition for murder (1941–1950) and reinstatement (1950–1961) ==
When the Labour Party formed its first government following the 1935 general election, it commuted all death sentences to life imprisonment. The Crimes Amendment Act 1941 changed the penalty for murder from death to life imprisonment with hard labour. The only crimes for which the death penalty still applied were treason and piracy.

The Labour Party lost power to the more conservative National Party, which had pledged to reintroduce capital punishment for murder, in 1949. During that earlier period, support and opposition for capital punishment were clearly delineated on partisan grounds. The National Party supported the restoration and maintenance of the death penalty, while the Labour Party opposed it. During debate over the Capital Punishment Act 1950 (which exempted expectant mothers and young persons under the age of 18 years), Labour expressed concern about the constitutional implications of the concentration of executive power in this context (although the Labour government had used this power from 1935 to 1941), while National Party Attorney-General Clifton Webb referred to the alleged "deterrent" value of the death penalty as potential threat and punitive severity. However, Webb was relatively sparing in his use of the death penalty, while his successor, Attorney-General Jack Marshall (1955–1957), was a hardliner on that issue and the number and pace of executions accelerated, arousing debate.

During the time that the National Party was in office (1949–1957), 36 people were convicted of murder, and 22 of those were sentenced to death (George Horry was convicted of murder in 1951 but not hanged because the death penalty was not in force in 1942). The final decision on executions rested with Cabinet, and only eight of the condemned were executed. The rest were commuted to life imprisonment. Even then, professional opinion was divided. Film censor Gordon Mirams did not regard spectacles of hanging as appropriate content within crime dramas and western films and excised such content and dialogue on the basis of family propriety.

According to Department of Justice historian Pauline Engel, the British Royal Commission on Capital Punishment (1953) may have heavily influenced the rise of abolitionism, as did the controversies that surrounded the executions of Harry Whiteland and Edward Te Whiu, which raised questions about post-war trauma, intellectual and developmental disability as factors for leniency.

Social historian Redmer Yska has argued that such concern arose much earlier. When the National Party restored capital punishment in 1950, it became an administrative ordeal for civil servants involved, particularly those within correctional facilities like Mount Eden Prison in Auckland, law enforcement and the judiciary. Corrections staff needed to maintain suicide watch for the convicted felon, conduct regular health checks and provide pastoral care for the condemned individual's relatives, as well as ensure prison security during executions.

Official requirements mandated the presence of a magistrate, doctor and sheriffs. During the late fifties, Attorney-General Jack Marshall accelerated the pace of executions and post-traumatic stress disorder, alcoholism and duodenal haemorrhaging developed amongst two of the three staff obliged to participate during execution procedures. In cases of political import, prudent reprieves and commuted penalties did occur, as happened when three Niue Islanders were sentenced to death after killing a manifestly brutal and oppressive Resident Commissioner (and were reprieved only after New Zealand prison officials had reached Niue to carry out the hangings). On that occasion, the Public Questions Committee of the Presbyterian Church of New Zealand became involved in strenuously lobbying against the verdict.

Class differences were also seen to affect the verdict. Dr. Senga Wintringham was convicted of manslaughter, rather than murder, in February 1955, after shooting and killing Dr Bill Saunders. Wintringham claimed that she had only meant to intimidate him, rather than kill him. The Peoples Voice, newspaper of the Communist Party of New Zealand, criticised the perceived "double standard" in this context, as the courts had just convicted and sentenced 26-year-old British migrant and itinerant labourer Frederick Foster to death, despite questions about mental illness and intellectual impairment in his context, as well as appeals from his mother. Foster had shot and killed Sharon Skeffington, his former girlfriend. Although Foster was sentenced to death and executed, defence counsel Dr Martyn Finlay succeeded in raising questions about the limited intellectual capabilities and mental health of the condemned person in this context. Similar questions would arise in the trial, conviction and execution of Albert Webb. The New Zealand Listener editorialised against the death penalty in July 1955, and received supportive feedback from its letters page correspondents.

Eddie Te Whiu was hanged in August 1955, after he had killed an elderly widow in Ngararatunua, near Kamo, when an attempted burglary went wrong. Abolitionist sentiment grew again, as, with the Foster and Black cases, there was perceptible anxiety about the failure of "deterrence" value in the context of violent homicides, and whether Te Whiu should have been convicted of manslaughter instead, due to his dysfunctional family origins and limited intellectual capabilities. As a result, a National Committee for Abolition of the Death Penalty was formed in November 1956, with branches in Auckland, Wellington, Christchurch and Dunedin.

Engel and Maureen Garing have drawn attention to the involvement of Protestant Christian opposition to capital punishment. In 1941 and 1951, the Christian Social Justice League, Christchurch Anglican Diocesan Synod and Methodist Public Questions Committee supported abolition, as did individual Catholics, although their hierarchy remained neutral in this debate. The New Zealand Theosophical Society also opposed capital punishment, and the Churches of Christ and Baptist Union declared its opposition in the late fifties. As religious opposition grew, it provided opponents of capital punishment with an organisational base that was used to good effect. Redmer Yska notes that clergy often refused to participate in legitimising executions through their presence, of whatever denomination.

As a consequence of controversy over the perceived escalation in use of capital punishment, abolitionist petitions started to circulate as well. In 1956, a proposal for a referendum on capital punishment was put forward by the Minister of Justice, Jack Marshall. This referendum was to be voted on during the 1957 general election, but the proposal was defeated.

Meanwhile, Walter James Bolton (1888–1957) was executed at Mount Eden Prison in February 1957, after he was convicted for poisoning his wife with arsenic. Given that the National Party lost that election, there were to be no further executions within New Zealand. However, while the election saw a short-lived Labour government elected, capital punishment was not debated in Parliament again before the National party regained power after the 1960 election.

In 1961, the National Party reaffirmed its support for the death penalty, although restricted its use to premeditated murders, and those committed during another crime or during an escape from custody. The issue of capital punishment generated intensive debate within the National Party—the Minister of Justice in the Second National Government, who was responsible for introducing the Crimes Bill 1961, Ralph Hanan, strongly opposed the death penalty, while Jack Marshall, the Deputy Prime Minister, had supported its use while serving as Minister of Justice and Attorney General, as noted above.

== Abolition for murder (1961) and onwards ==
Aware of growing public opposition to capital punishment, the National Party allowed its MPs to exercise a conscience vote in Parliament, and ten National MPs subsequently voted in favour of abolition. The result was a majority of 11 against capital punishment, 41–30. The ten National MPs were Ernest Aderman, Gordon Grieve, Ralph Hanan, Duncan MacIntyre, Robert Muldoon, Lorrie Pickering, Logan Sloane, Brian Talboys, Esme Tombleson and Bert Walker. The death penalty was therefore abolished for murder. It was retained for treason, mutiny and treachery, but no further executions took place.

Capital punishment was abolished completely under the Palmer Labour government in November 1989 with the passage of the Abolition of the Death Penalty Act 1989. The Cook Islands, which based its statutes on New Zealand law, formally retained the death penalty for treason until it was abolished in 2007. However, the death penalty was never used in the Cook Islands.

Occasional calls to reinstate capital punishment still occur, but no major political party has made capital punishment an element of any of their election manifestos since the 1989 abolition act. As for minor political parties, the solitary exception was the fundamentalist Christian Heritage New Zealand, which has been defunct since 2005.

A 2004 1News Colmar Brunton poll found 28% were in favour of reinstating the death penalty, 67% were not, and 5% were undecided. In a 2013 Curia poll for TV3's The Nation, 38% of New Zealanders were in favour of the death penalty—a nominal increase from the 28% in 2004—while 55% were opposed it, and 7% were undecided. Also in the poll, 35% of Labour voters favoured the death penalty and National voters' support polled at 44%. Least likely to be in favour were Green Party voters at 19%, but the strongest support came from New Zealand First voters at 84%.

== See also ==
- Capital punishment in the Cook Islands
- List of people executed in New Zealand

== Bibliography ==
- Department of Justice (1974) [1968]. Crime in New Zealand: A Survey of New Zealand Criminal Behaviour. Wellington: A R Shearer Government Printer. (Homicide: Chapter 2, pp20–83)
- Creswell, J.C.M. (1998) Murder in paradise: The strange adventures of the Roberton brothers Whangarei: J.M. Glover ISBN 1-876135-00-X
- Engel, Pauline (1977): The Abolition of Capital Punishment in New Zealand: Wellington: Department of Justice.
- Garing, Maureen (1994): "Lex talionis and the Christian Churches: The Question of Capital Punishment in New Zealand" (p. 112–122) in J. Veitch (ed) To Strive and Not to Yield: Essays in Honour of Colin Brown: Wellington: Victoria University Department of Religious Studies: ISBN 0-475-11013-7
- Garret, David (1998) A Life for A Life: A Case for Capital Punishment: Christchurch: Hazard Press
- Gee, David (1975). The devil's own brigade: A History of Lyttelton Gaol: Wellington: Millwood Press.
- Harcourt, Melville (1942). A Parson In Prison: Auckland: Whitcombs and Tombs.
- Howard League for Penal Reform (1949) Capital Punishment: An Inquiry: Wellington: Howard League for Penal Reform.
- Newbold, Greg (1990). "Capital Punishment in New Zealand: An Experiment that Failed" Deviant Behaviour: 11:2 (April 1990): 154–177.
- Ross, Cuthbert (1993) Issues in the Death Penalty Debate in New Zealand: 1935–1992 LLB (Hons) Dissertation: University of Auckland Faculty of Law
- Treadwell, C A L (1936). Notable New Zealand Trials: New Plymouth: T.Avery.
- Young, Sherwood (1998) Guilty on the Gallows: Famous Capital Crimes of New Zealand: Wellington: Grantham House: ISBN 1-86934-068-X
- Yska, Redmer (1996) All Shook Up: Auckland: Penguin: 1996: ISBN 0-14-016999-7
- Meccano Set, a program by Radio New Zealand produced by Matthew Leonard and Paul Diamond
