= Tarore =

New Zealand Māori child martyr (died 1836)

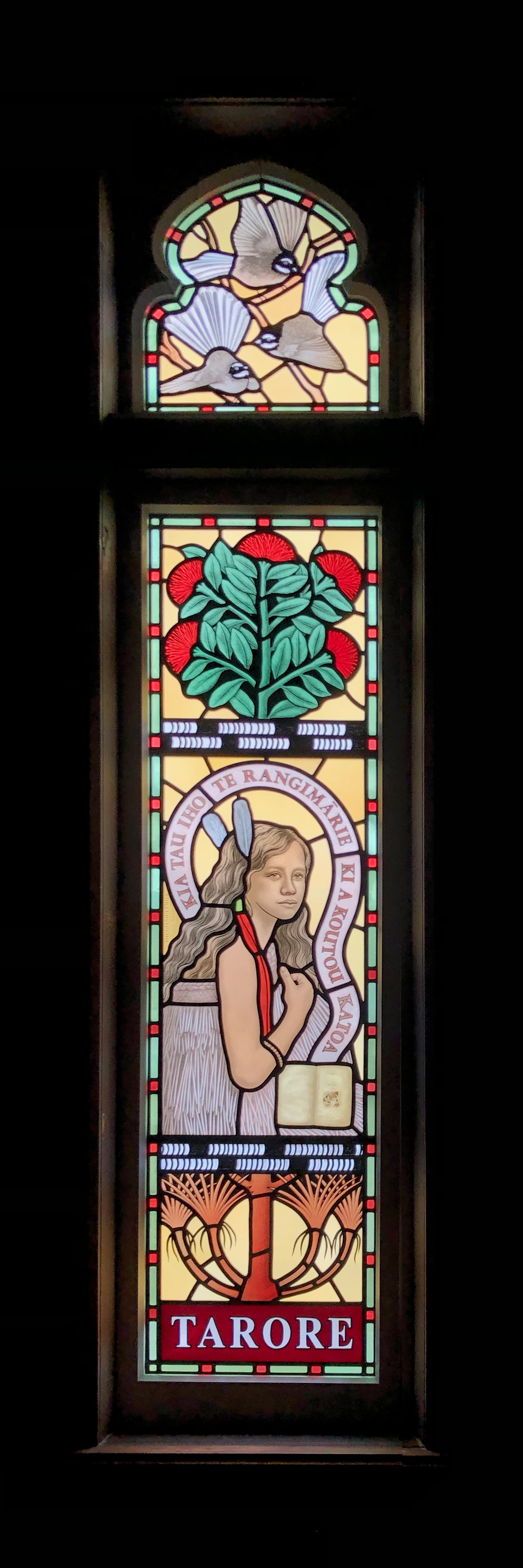
Tarore stained glass window, St Aidan's Anglican Church, Auckland, commissioned 2011. Three pīwakawaka (fantails) above symbolise the Trinity. The informal flower image represents youth. Tarore holds a copy of the Gospel of Luke in te reo Māori. The words around her head translate from te reo as "Peace be with you". Below is the tree of life, a Joshua Tree.

Tarore (c. 1824 – 19 October 1836) was a Christian martyr and child prodigy. She was the daughter of Wiremu Ngākuku, a rangatira (chief) of the Māori iwi (tribe) Ngāti Hauā in the North Island of New Zealand. Her story is treasured by the New Zealand church as an example of forgiveness after her father chose not seek revenge against her killers following her death, and her gospel book was key to the spread of Christianity amongst Māori.

== Ministry ==
In April 1835, a mission station was opened in Matamata by Reverend Alfred Brown and his wife, Charlotte, for the Church Missionary Society.

In 1836, Tarore was given an early Māori language copy of the Gospel of Luke, (Note: Sources differ on Tarore's age in 1936, but generally place her as either ten or twelve years old.) and from the book, Charlotte Brown taught Tarore to read. Because of her ability to memorise much of the gospel, Tarore was considered a prodigy. She would recite portions of the gospel to crowds of 200–300 of her people and was supported by her father as a lay evangelist.

== Murder ==
In October 1836, Tarore was evacuated with the other pupils from her Church Missionary Society school in Matamata, because of a violent and cannibalistic conflict between iwi. She took her father's rare Māori Gospel of Luke in a small kete (basket) she wore around her neck. Whilst stopped for the night of 18 October near the Wairere Falls in the Kaimai Ranges, her party of 24, including her peace-loving father, was attacked by a Ngāti Whakaue war party from Rotorua, Tārore was murdered and the book stolen by warrior Paora Te Uita. Her ritualistically mutilated body was carried back to the Matamata mission station and was given a Christian burial. The Māori law of utu required revenge for her death, but at her tangi (funeral) her Christian father spoke words of forgiveness and said "do not rise up to obtain satisfaction for her. God will do that."

== Aftermath ==
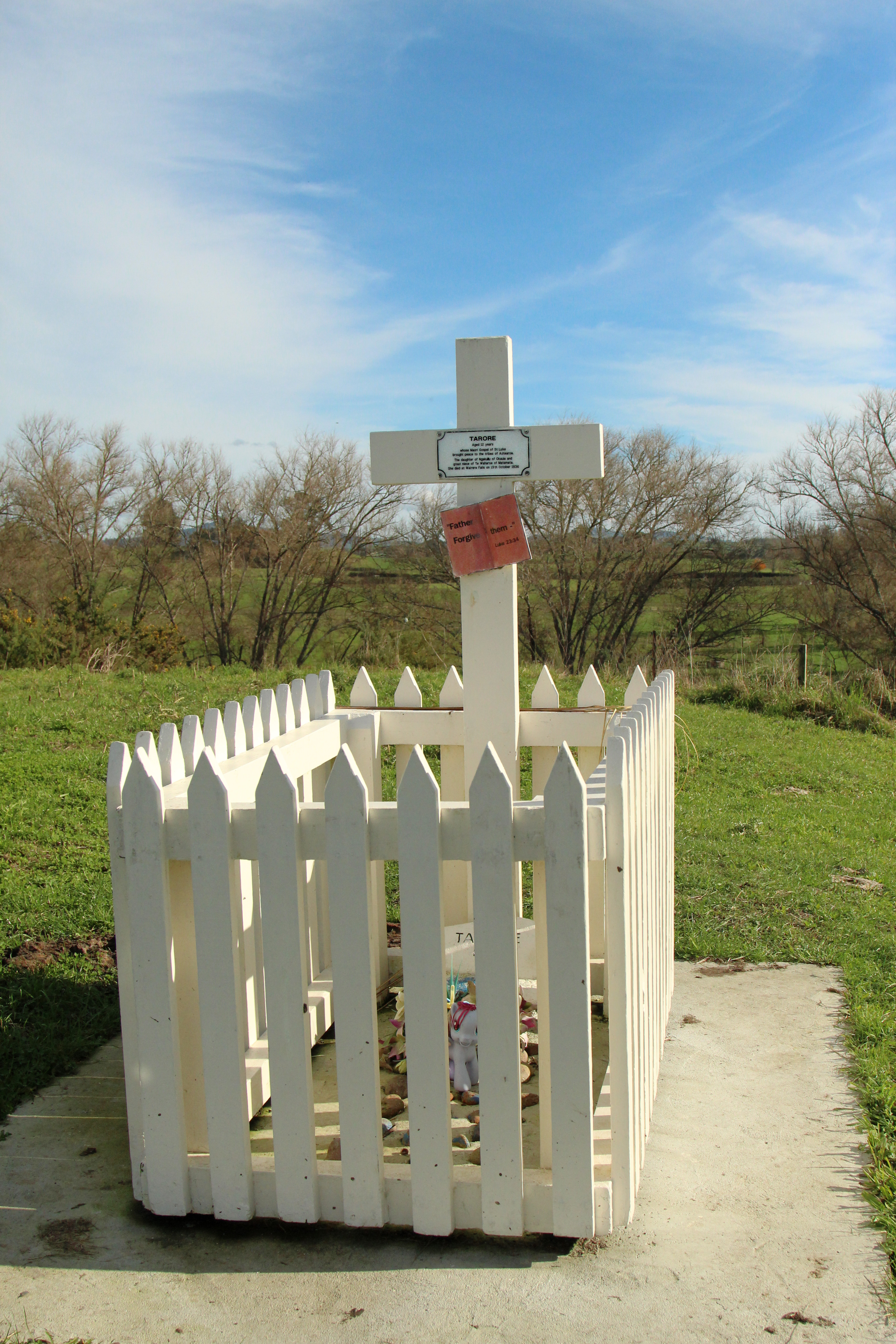
Tarore's grave, at the Matamata pā site near Waharoa.

Several weeks later, back in Rotorua, Uita asked visiting ex-slave, mission school educated Ripahau (also known as Matahau) of Ngāti Awa to explain the book to him. This led him to become a Christian and to ask for forgiveness from Ngākuku, leading to their reconciliation. The book, identified by Ngākuku's inscribed name, was then taken south and ended up in the hands of Ripahau again in Ōtaki. It continued to play a key role in Māori evangelising to Māori for years to come, including the introduction of the gospel to the South Island for the first time.

== Legacy ==
Tarore's grave was located in 1976 at the Matamata pā (fortification) site near the village of Waharoa, and the following year a white cross headstone and plaque were created to commemorate her death, her father's forgiveness and the spread of Christianity through New Zealand that was influenced by her book.

In 1997, The Legend of Tarore documentary was broadcast on New Zealand national television.

In 2009, Joy Cowley and Mary Clover Bibby wrote the children's book, Tārore and her Book. The same year, the Churches Education Commission gave 240,000 free copies of the book to New Zealand primary schools because of its historical significance to both Māori and Christianity in New Zealand.

Tarore's story has been described as "the iconic narrative of the early missionary period" in New Zealand. The archbishop of the New Zealand dioceses and the Archbishop of Canterbury's Representative to the Holy See, The Most Reverend Sir David Moxon described Tarore's story and gospel book as "amongst the taonga (treasures) of the Church in Aotearoa" and called Tarore a "child martyr".

Tarore is honoured by the Anglican Church in Aotearoa, New Zealand and Polynesia in The Calendar section of A New Zealand Prayer Book / He Karakia Mihinare o Aotearoa on October 19 as one of the country's first martyrs. The Collect for her feast day on 19 October, the day of her martyrdom, is found in the Prayer Book lectionary, For All the Saints.

== See also ==
- Wiremu Kīngi Maketū
