= Ruhe (Māori chief) =

Ruhe (? – 1865) was a Māori chief of the Ngāpuhi iwi (tribe) in northern New Zealand. He lived at Kaikohe.

At the first signing of the Treaty of Waitangi on 6 February 1840, Ruhe gave a concerted physical display and speech against the treaty. He would go on to sign the Treaty of Waitangi later that day. Next to his name was the statement in Māori "Te Tohu o Ruhe te tamaiti o Kopiri", meaning "The mark of Ruhe the son of Kōpiri".

In 1841, Ruhe's son Maketū Wharetotara was accused of the murder of five people on Motuarohia Island. After being found guilty, Maketū Wharetotara became the first person executed under British law in New Zealand.

It was said that Ruhe suffered severe grief after his son died. Ruhe committed suicide in 1865 by shooting himself.
