= Phoebe Veitch =

New Zealand murderer

- Died: 2 September 1891; Wellington's Terrace Gaol
- Known for: The murder of her daughter.

Phoebe Veitch (née Harper) (c.1860–1891) was a New Zealand murderer. She drowned her daughter Phoebe in the Wanganui River in 1883 and was tried and subsequently convicted of murder. Whilst she was originally sentenced to death, her sentence was later commuted to life imprisonment.

== Early life ==
Phoebe was born and raised in Feilding in the North Island, New Zealand around 1860. In 1874 she went to work at her uncle's hotel in Nelson in the South Island, New Zealand. Although only 14 years old she became pregnant and the following year gave birth to a son, Herbert Bertrand Harper.

In 1876 she met Robert Veitch who had come to work as a barman in the hotel. Phoebe became pregnant again and gave birth to a daughter and in 1879 married Veitch. Shortly after the marriage, Phoebe was born. However, Phoebe was clearly not Robert's child, as she was half-Asian. This became common knowledge in the community. In 1882 he wandered off and never returned. Phoebe turned to prostitution to survive.

She contracted lupus and moved home.

== Drowning of daughter and conviction ==
On Monday 26 February 1883, Veitch drowned her four-year-old daughter (also named Phoebe Veitch) in the Wanganui River. According to a contemporary newspaper account, the body of the younger Phoebe Veitch was found on the Wanganui River beach on the morning of 27 February by Arthur Fitchett, a telegraph linesperson. Giving medical testimony, Dr Earle noted that the drowned child was the product of a cross-cultural relationship between persons of Chinese and European descent.

According to Mrs Eliza Blight, a second witness, Mrs Phoebe Veitch had three children- Herbert (7), Eva (5 or 6), and "Flossie" (Phoebe) (4). Mrs Blight noted that Mrs Veitch was having difficulty bringing up her children and had intended to send her daughter to Feilding, a northern settlement in the Manawatu district in the North Island of New Zealand. Mrs Blight noted that Mrs Veitch had tried to make her friend believe that the daughter was in danger from her aunt and might drown her.

Wanganui Police Inspector James was the next witness. At first, Mrs Veitch said she did not know where her daughter was, but under further investigation from the inspector and two police officers, she then claimed that her daughter had fallen accidentally from the Wanganui River wharf and drowned. Subsequently, after being taken to view her child's body, Mrs. Veitch changed her story once more and then stated that it was the child's putative father who killed her. She said his name was "Sam Timaru" and gave contradictory descriptions of his ethnicity as either from India or Fiji. Further evidence revealed that Mrs. Veitch was a single parent and had been abandoned by her children's father to bring them up alone. Her husband or lover did not appear during the trial to substantiate these claims.

The jury retired and found Phoebe Veitch guilty of murder, but with a recommendation of mercy. Mrs. Veitch was pregnant with another child at the time, the Chief Justice of the Supreme Court then sentenced her to death, although it remained to be disclosed whether the pregnancy could be substantiated by local midwives. This was then proven and her death sentence was deferred until after the birth. She named her fourth child Robert who was taken away to a "baby farm" shortly after birth.

== Reprieve and death ==
On 25 May it was reported that Ministers of the Crown had intervened in the case and commuted Mrs. Veitch's sentence to life imprisonment. She was imprisoned in Wellington at the Terrace Gaol and gave birth to a fourth child, Robert, before dying there on 2 September 1891

Comparing the Veitch case with those of Caroline Whitting, Sarah-Jane and Anna Flannagan and Minnie Dean, Bronwyn Dalley has suggested that the courts were willing to recognise that arduous social and family circumstances could lead to maternal 'madness' and may have prompted commuted sentences, while Dean's death sentence was related to an element of deliberation absent in the Veitch, Whitting and other cases of parental child murder. Since the emergence of social historian interest in infanticide as a practice within New Zealand society, Phoebe Veitch's case has received increased recognition, given that it was one of the most prominent case law predecessors to that of Minnie Dean, who was executed for baby farming. The Veitch case still attracts local media interest True crime criminal justice heritage websites also maintain an interest in the case

== See also ==
- Minnie Dean, the only woman executed in New Zealand history.
- Caroline Whitting, also sentenced to death in 1872, after the murder of three of her own children, but also reprieved.
- Lillian Fanny Jane Hobbs, acquitted of negligence and infant death after childbirth in 1907.
- Infanticide in 19th-century New Zealand
