= William Henry Woodgate =

- Born: 1827; Beer, Devon, England
- Died: 25 January 1877 (aged 49–50); Picton, New Zealand
- Resting place: Picton Gaolyard (originally located at 5 Waitohi Place)
- Status: Executed by hanging
- Conviction: Murder
- Penalty: Death

William Henry Woodgate (1827 – 25 January 1877) was the 37th person to be hanged in New Zealand and the last to be hanged in the Marlborough Sounds.

== Life and crimes ==
William Henry Woodgate was born at Beer, Devon, UK, in 1827 and baptised on 1 January 1828. In the 1841 Census, he was living at Signal House, Beer, with his parents Robert and Elizabeth Woodgate and his younger siblings. William married Margaret (Mary Ann) Heberley in 1863.

He was accused and put on trial at the Supreme Court of New Zealand for the murder of the newborn baby of his niece Susan Woodgate, the daughter of his brother Robert. He was thought to be the father of her child. Susan Woodgate's grandfather, James Heberley, testified at the trial in December 1876 that the accused had been living at Point Resolution, Marlborough, for 13 years (since about 1863). After the death of William's brother Robert, William lived in a common law marriage with Robert's widow, who also subsequently died. Robert's daughter Susan continued to live with William at his dwelling, which was about 3 miles (4.8 km) from the nearest house.

Defence counsel submitted that there was no evidence of murder having been committed. Two witnesses testified that they had seen Susan heavily pregnant. Susan testified that Woodgate had threatened to smother the newborn at birth and that he later told her he had done so, but she did not see the child at any time. Her sister Elizabeth testified that she had heard the cry of an infant. The case turned on whether the jury believed the sisters and whether the alleged infant had been fully delivered and whether it had been separated from its mother, according to the definition of infanticide at the time. The jury deliberated for 55 minutes before finding Woodgate guilty of wilful murder. Woodgate was well regarded in the community and despite the nature of the crime there was a public outcry over his sentence. A petition was sent to the Governor but it was summarily dismissed. After the Sheriff found no one willing to execute Woodgate, his execution was postponed until a suitable person was found.

At 6.30am on Thursday, 25 January 1877, eight days after the original date, he was hanged at Picton. Following his execution, his body was buried in the gaolyard next to Taherei, a previously executed criminal.

== See also ==
- List of murder convictions without a body
