= David Gwillim =

English actor (born 1948)

- Born: 15 December 1948 (age 77); Plymouth, England
- Occupation: Actor
- Years active: 1971–2011
- Spouse(s): Lynn Dearth (1974–1994) (her death); Deirdra Morris (1997–present)

David Gwillim (born 15 December 1948) is an English actor. He was introduced to an international audience when he appeared in four episodes of the 1978 TV series Lillie. He is known for playing Prince Hal in the BBC Television Shakespeare adaptations of Henry IV, Part I and Henry IV, Part II and the title role in Henry V which were broadcast in 1979, and as John Bold in The Barchester Chronicles broadcast in 1982.

In 2021 David Gwillim contributed to, and participated in, a YouTube documentary tribute to Alfred Burke entitled Alfred Burke is Frank Marker

== Biography ==
Gwillim was born in Plymouth. He is the son of Jack Gwillim. His sister Sarah-Jane Gwillim and half brother Jaxon Duff Gwillim are also actors.

David Gwillim married actress Lynn Dearth in 1974; she died in 1994. His second wife is actress Deirdra Morris, whom he married in 1997.

== Filmography ==
Year	Title	Role	Notes
1970	NET Playhouse		Uncredited, Episode: "The Ceremony of Innocence"
1973	Public Eye	Vyvyan Reveldale	Episode: "The Golden Boy"
1974	The Island at the Top of the World	Donald Ross	
1975	Play of the Month	Longeville	Episode: "Love's Labour's Lost"
1975	Thriller	Henry Vanner	Episode: "If it's a Man, Hang Up"
1977	Anna Karenina	Petritsky	6 episodes
1978	Enemy at the Door	Anton Schen	1 episode
1978	Lillie	Arthur Jones	
1979	Henry IV Part I	Henry, Prince of Wales	TV movie
1979	Henry IV Part II	Henry, Prince of Wales	TV movie
1979	Henry V	Henry, Prince of Wales	TV movie
1981	Peter and Paul	Mark	TV movie
1982	BBC2 Playhouse	Bennett	Episode: "How Many Miles to Babylon?"
1983	The Barchester Chronicles	John Bold	2 episodes
1983	The Citadel	David Hope	5 episodes
1984	The Adventures of Sherlock Holmes	Percy Phelps	Episode: "The Naval Treaty"
1984	The Invisible Man	Dr. Samuel Kemp	3 episodes
1985	Hanlon	Alf Hanlon	7 episodes
1994	Nostradamus	Michael's Father	
1997	The Architect	Albert Speer	Short
1997-1998	Trial & Retribution	Clive Grifith	3 episodes
1999	Do Not Disturb	VanDerMolen	
2001	Down	Blind Man (Mr Faith)	
2003	Henry VIII	Physician	TV movie
2005	Bad Girls	Mr. Fergus	Series 7, Episode 10
2011	Age of Heroes	SS Mountain Troops	Uncredited
