= Edward Te Whiu =

New Zealand murderer (1935–1955)

- Born: 27 February 1935; Waipapakauri, Northland, New Zealand
- Died: 18 August 1955 (aged 20); Mount Eden Prison, Auckland, New Zealand
- Status: Executed by hanging
- Motive: Burglary
- Conviction: Murder
- Penalty: Death

Details
- Victims: Florence Smith, 75
- Date: 28 April 1955

Edward Thomas Te Whiu (27 February 1935 – 18 August 1955) was one of the last four New Zealanders to be executed for murder. He was hanged at Mount Eden Prison in August 1955, after he had killed Florence Smith, a 75-year-old widow, in Ngararatunua, near Kamo, during a burglary on 28 April 1955. At the time of the murders, Te Whiu had been on probation for cashing a forged check.

Of Māori descent, Te Whiu’s parents were both of the Ngāpuhi tribe. He was born in Waipapakauri, Northland, New Zealand, in 1935.

Evidence was given that he had calmly cooked himself a meal in the next room to the corpse of his aged victim. At his trial, Te Whiu's defense counsel argued that he had panicked, and did not intend to kill Smith. Te Whiu himself claimed that he only meant to knock her unconscious. The "completely non-adjusted a-social youth" went happily to his death. He took a cigarette an hour before the hanging, smiled and said, "won't it be wonderful to be in heaven where cigarettes can come flying through the air." One of his last requests was to have his religious comics thrown into his grave with him.
