= Hamiora Pere =

New Zealand criminal

Hamiora Pere (died 16 November 1869) was a New Zealander executed for treason.

== Background ==
Pere was a participant in the Te Kooti's War, one of the New Zealand Wars. When Te Kooti's forces were defeated at the siege of Ngatapa, in 1869, around 270 people were taken prisoner. Along with four other survivors (Hetariki Te Oikau, Matene Te Karo, Rewi Tamanui Totitoti, and Wi Tamararo), Pere was taken to Wellington, where he was put on trial for high treason against the British crown. Pere and Tamararo were also charged with murder.

Three of the accused, Te Oikau, Te Karo, and Totitoti, began their trial on 20 September 1869, and were found guilty after four days. They were sentenced to be hanged, then beheaded, and then quartered — this was the mandatory sentence for treason, although the judge indicated that perhaps the beheading and quartering would not actually be carried out. Pere and Tamararo were to be tried separately, as they were accused of murder as well as treason. Tamararo's trial began on 27 September, although treason charges were dropped, leaving only charges of murder. He was found guilty and sentenced to the same punishment as the others.

== Trial and execution ==
When Pere himself began his trial, the murder charges were dropped, leaving only the charge of treason. Pere's defence focused on three primary claims:

- That Pere had been conscripted into Te Kooti's army by force.
- That even if Pere hadn't been conscripted, the cause he saw himself as fighting for (resisting the encroachment of those who were stealing his land) was just.
- That Pere did not realise that Britain regarded itself as sovereign over New Zealand, and that he, therefore, did not understand himself to be committing treason.

Pere was supported in his trial by Maata Te Owai, one of Te Kooti's wives. Te Owai testified that Pere had not joined Te Kooti's forces willingly. Other evidence indicated that Pere had been present when several murders of colonists took place, although no uncorroborated evidence was presented that Pere had actually committed or condoned the crime. (Oddly, this evidence better fits the charge of murder than the charge of treason, but it was the charge of murder that was abandoned.) In the end, Pere was found guilty of treason. The judge deferred Pere's sentencing for a time, but eventually ordered the same punishment as for the others.

Wi Tamararo had committed suicide two days after being sentenced, leaving only four of the convicted alive. Later, on 13 October, the Governor chose to commute the sentence of Hetariki Te Oikau to life imprisonment. On 2 November, a surprise decision also commuted the sentences of Matene Te Karo and Rewi Tamanui Totitoti. This left Pere as the only person facing execution. Addressing Pere's case directly, the Executive Council claimed that Pere's participation in the war had been voluntary, and accused him of active involvement in murders of colonists. It also said that Pere, unlike some others, had no tribal allegiances which compelled him to participate.

Pere was hanged in Wellington on 16 November 1869. He is the only New Zealander ever to be executed on charges of treason, with all other executees having been convicted of murder. As capital punishment in New Zealand is no longer in effect, he is expected to retain this distinction permanently.

== Recent re-examinations ==
More recently, Hamiora Pere's case has been re-examined, with some claiming that he was treated unfairly. It has been alleged that if the three other accused had their sentences commuted, Pere should have been treated the same way — there was no corroborated evidence that Pere had actually committed murder. (It is argued that the Crown realised this, and that this is why the separate murder charge was dropped.) According to some theories, Pere was executed not because he was deemed to have deserved it, but because the government "needed someone to hang" to satisfy public opinion or to serve as an example. Wi Tamararo, against whom the strongest evidence of murder was presented, deprived the government of a hanging by committing suicide, leaving Pere as the only real candidate. In the minutes of the Executive Council, an opinion was noted that "one execution will be [as] useful as more would have been by way of example and caution".
