= Joseph Burns (murderer) =

Murderer

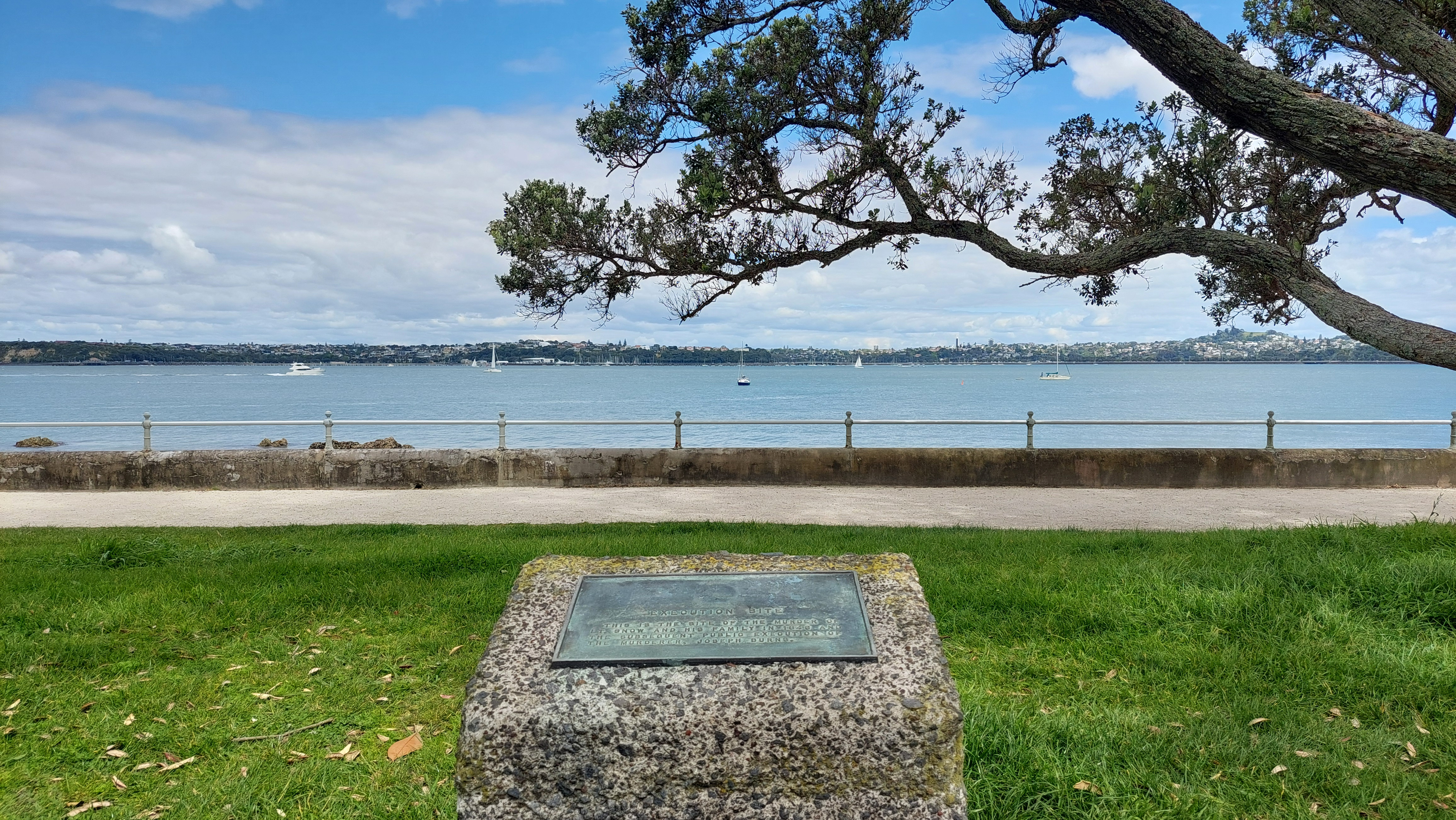
Plaque in Devonport, Auckland, on the spot where Burns was hanged.

Joseph Burns (c. 1806 – 17 June 1848) was a New Zealand murderer, born in Liverpool, England. He was the first European in New Zealand to be executed for a capital crime. He was hanged on 17 June 1848 at what later became Devonport, today a suburb of Auckland.

The plaque on the spot of his hanging erroneously states that this was also the place of the murders, and that the crime occurred in 1848.
