= Winifred Carrick =

Winifred Carrick (23 April 1892 – 1938?) was a New Zealand woman who was acquitted of child murder in February 1918, after the death of her three-year-old son Donald in December 1917. She was born (1892) and married (1919) as Mary Winifred Carrick.

== Circumstances of case (December 1917) ==
In May 1915, Carrick tried to abandon her infant son Donald Lewis Carrick by leaving him in a hollow tree on the banks of the Avon River in Christchurch, New Zealand. She was located and bail was set at two hundred pounds. She was unable to pay and served a two-year prison sentence. In the interim period, her son had been fostered out to the Burns family in Addington, a suburb of Christchurch. Upon her release, Carrick contacted the Burns and spent time with her three-year-old son, although she had stated that she was experiencing financial hardship and could not pay maintenance for her child. On the night of 10 December 1917, Donald went missing. On 11 December, he was found amidst potatoes in the Burns family garden at 31 Clifton Street with his head battered in. Carrick could not account for her whereabouts and moreover, her skirt, stockings and handbag had dirt particles adhering to them

Consequently, Carrick was charged with 'wilful murder' of her child and there was a resultant trial in Christchurch between December 1917 and February 1918. However, Justice Chapman noted that the prosecution had provided circumstantial evidence alone for the case in question and advised the jury that if it had any doubt about Carrick's culpability for the death of her son, they should return a 'not guilty' verdict. As it happened, the jury indeed had doubts about the evidence offered and returned a not guilty verdict, and so Carrick was acquitted of 'wilful murder' of her child.

Carrick married Charles Riley on 2 May 1919 and appears to have died in 1938.

== See also ==
- Lillian Fanny Jane Hobbs, also charged with wilful murder of her child but also acquitted (1907)
- Infanticide in Nineteenth Century New Zealand
