= Caroline Whitting =

New Zealand 19th century murderer

Caroline Whitting (c. 1834 – ?) was a nineteenth-century New Zealand murderer, who was found guilty of killing three of her children through drowning in 1872 and sentenced to death. However, as with Phoebe Veitch in 1883, her sentence was commuted and she was instead sentenced to life imprisonment.

== Drowning (October 1872) ==
Carl and Caroline Whitting were born in Berlin, Prussia, but there are no further details about the circumstances of her birth, emigration to New Zealand, or marriage. On 25 October 1872, Mrs. Caroline Whitting (38) left her Southland farm with three of her children: Fred (an infant), John, and Carl. Mrs Whitting then took her three sons to the Waikiwi river, where she drowned them and may have tried to drown herself, but was later found in adjacent bush. A daughter escaped from her mother and told her older sister, who was 16, about what had happened, leading to a police search for the bodies of the children and investigation as to whether Mrs. Whitting herself was still alive. The bodies were located in the water and Mrs. Whitting was taken into police custody. A subsequent inquest turned up a judgement of 'wilful murder' on the same day. However, it seems to have been mitigated to life imprisonment

Other than an acrimonious marital relationship and possible family violence between Carl and Caroline Whitting according to the testimony of their surviving children, few other records survive about the case, her conviction or her fate after her sentence to capital punishment was commuted to life imprisonment. Mrs Whitting was escorted into Dunedin Gaol on 24 November 1872

Comparing the case with those of Phoebe Veitch and Minnie Dean, Bronwyn Daley has suggested that the courts were willing to recognize that circumstances could lead to maternal 'madness' and may have prompted commuted sentences, while Dean's death sentence was related to an element of deliberation absent in the Veitch, Whitting and other cases of parental child murder

== See also ==
- Infanticide in 19th-century New Zealand
