= Wiremu Kīngi Maketū =

First person executed in New Zealand under British rule

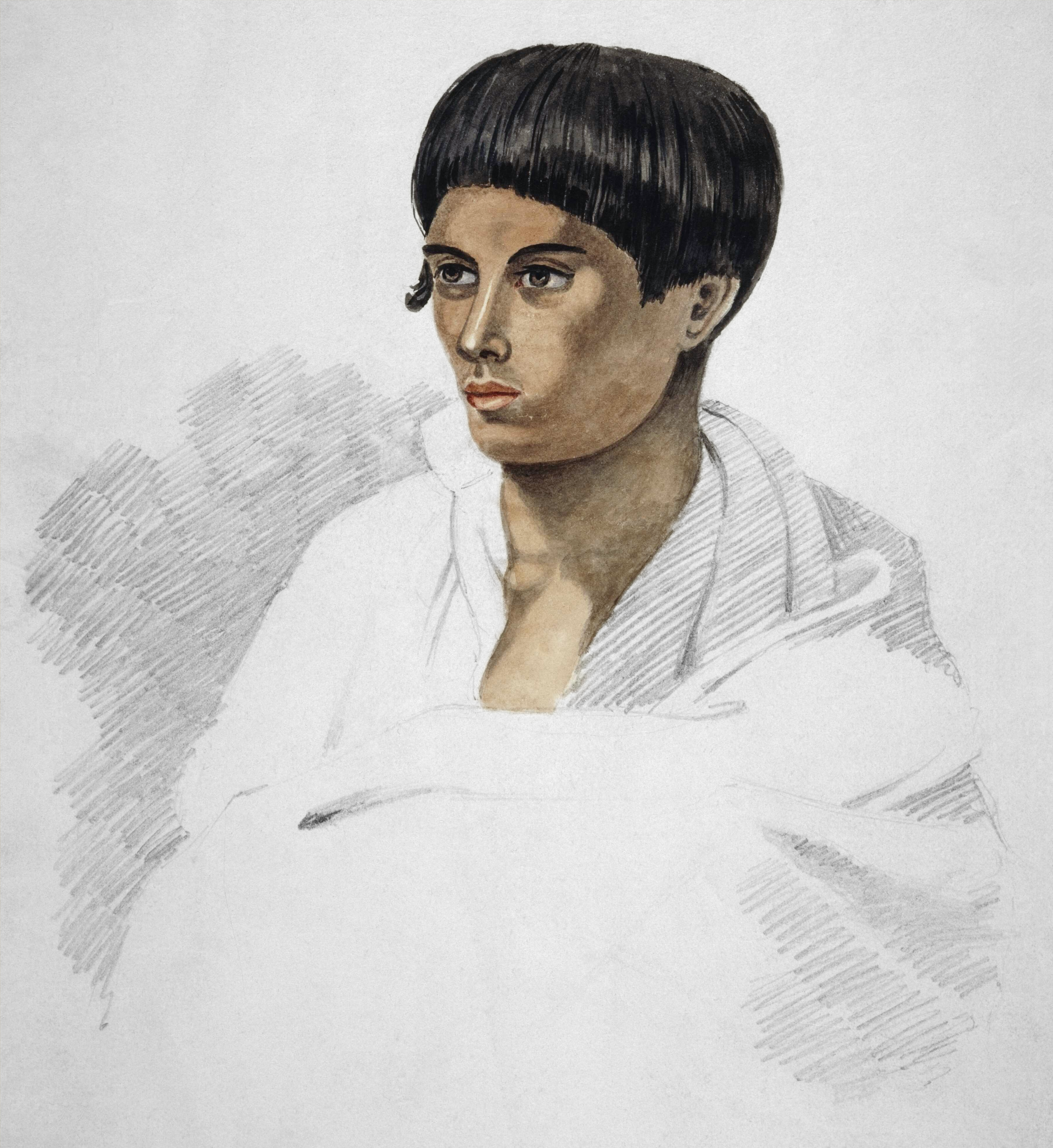
Wiremu Kīngi Maketū

Wiremu Kīngi Maketū (also known as Maketū Wharetotara or Waretotara) (c. 1824 – 7 March 1842) was the first person executed in New Zealand under British rule. Maketū was also the first New Zealand Māori to be tried and punished based on British sovereignty over New Zealand.

== The murders on Motuarohia Island ==
Maketū was the son of Ruhe of Waimate, a chief of the Ngāpuhi. Maketū was accused of the murder of 5 people on 20 November 1841 on Motuarohia Island in the Bay of Islands. He was accused of killing Thomas Bull (referred to in the later trial as Tamati Puru) with an adze. The explanation for this killing was that Thomas Bull had been mistreating Maketū.

Maketū was accused of then killing his employer Elizabeth Roberton (a widow), her two children and Isabella Brind, who was the granddaughter of Rewa, a chief of the Ngai Tawake hapū of the Ngāpuhi iwi of Kerikeri. Isabella's parents were Moewaka (Rewa's daughter) and Captain William Darby Brind. He was also accused of setting Roberton's house on fire.

== The arguments among the Ngāpuhi as to the surrender of Maketū to the colonial authorities ==
At first the Ngāpuhi refused to surrender Maketū to the colonial authorities for trial. Eventually Ruhe, the father, consented. It may be assumed that the death of Rewa's grandchild, for which utu [an act of reciprocation for the death] was due, had much to do with this decision. Hōne Heke had been absent from the Bay of Islands, and on his return he advocated among the Ngāpuhi for confrontation against the Government.

A meeting of the Ngāpuhi was arranged by the Rev. Henry Williams at Paihia at the request of Tāmati Wāka Nene. The meeting took place on 16 December 1841 and including Ngāpuhi from Whangaroa and Hokianga, with upwards of a thousand being present. The meeting was turbulent with Heke expressing his opposition to the surrender of Maketū. When he rose to speak, he interrupted Paerau who was speaking and flourishing his hatchet at him. Upon this Whiria (Pōmare II) left the meeting as he did not want to be involved in fighting between the different hapū of the Ngāpuhi, which had occurred in 1830 in the so-called Girls' War. Heke did not persuade the Ngāpuhi to accept his position. The meeting ended with Heke and his supporters conducting a Haka on the beach at Paihia, firing their muskets, which were loaded with ball.

Henry Williams prepared a statement of resolutions made by the Ngāpuhi who dissociated themselves from Maketū's action, which was signed by Tāmati Wāka Nene, Pomare II, Waikato, Rewa, and Ruhe (Maketū's father). This message was sent to George Clarke, who had been appointed by Lieutenant-Governor William Hobson as the 'Protector of Aborigines'. The message was published in The New Zealand Herald and Auckland Gazette. Ruhe seems to have been over-borne by the Ngāpuhi chiefs that supported the surrender of Maketū, as afterwards Ruhe appeared to regret his decision as he threatened to shoot George Clarke's cattle because he had taken his son prisoner to Auckland.

== The trial of Maketū for murder ==
Beginning on 1 March 1842, Maketū was tried in the Supreme Court in Auckland with Chief Justice William Martin presiding. It was the first time that a Māori had been brought before the colonial courts. C.B. Brewer was only retained to appear as Maketū's legal counsel about an hour before the trial came on; he had no opportunity of communicating with Maketū, nor did he see the depositions before he came into court that morning. Brewer argued that the court did not have jurisdiction over Maketū, on the ground of the prisoner's ignorance of the crime of murder that was in the penal law of the colony, and of his having no possible means or opportunity of understanding the penal law of the colony. William Swainson, the prosecuting counsel, argued that there should be one rule for all people, whether Māori or Pākehā. Martin CJ ruled that Maketū could be tried and punished by the court.

Maketū pleaded not guilty. The jury heard evidence of Maketū's confessions to the killings and he was convicted of murder by a jury and was sentenced to death. He was hanged at the corner of Queen and Victoria Streets in Auckland. On the morning of his execution, he requested to be baptised in the Anglican rite and took the Christian names "Wiremu Kīngi". Just prior to his execution, Maketū dictated a statement whereby he said that his execution was just because "it is my own doing" and that he had prayed to God to "wash my sins away".

Maketū was approximately 16 when the crimes were committed. He was executed in Auckland on 7 March 1842, at the age of 17.

== The aftermath of the trial ==
Later in 1842, Swainson, who was the attorney general, wrote to the Colonial Office, giving his legal opinion that the proceedings was usurpation of Māori sovereignty and went beyond the provisions of the Treaty of Waitangi. The response by James Stephen of the Colonial Office concluded "Mr Swainson may think this is unjust or impolitic or inconsistent with former Acts, but still it is done". Moon (2013) comments that "what made this extension of British law into Maori communities possible in the manner in which it happened was the 16 December 1841 resolution which the twenty chiefs signed."

These events were considered a turning point in the history of the Colony, as Hōne Heke became an antagonist to the colonial administration and began gathering support among the Ngāpuhi for a rebellion against the colonial administration, which occurred in 1845 with the Flagstaff War.

== See also ==
- Tarore

== Additional information ==
- Paul Moon (2010). New Zealand Birth Certificates: 50 of New Zealand's Founding Documents (Auckland, AUT Media: ISBN 9780958299718) pp 68–69.
