= Lillian Hobbs =

Lillian Fanny Jane Hobbs (1882–1952) was a New Zealand woman who was acquitted of killing her newborn infant through neglect and therefore was not found guilty of infanticide.

== Circumstances of case ==
On 7 October 1907 in Christchurch, New Zealand, kitchen maid Hobbs gave birth to an infant in the lavatory of the restaurant where she worked. A coworker had noticed her pregnancy for the last three months, but Hobbs appeared shortly after giving birth and stated that she was recovering from cholera. However, there were bloodstains found in the lavatory and the body of a newborn infant was found, wrapped in Hobbs' skirt and clothing underneath a pile of clothes. When questioned by police, Hobbs stated that she was not aware whether the newborn infant was dead or alive, as it had not cried since its birth. Hobbs was tried before the Supreme Court for child murder but the defence argued that the young woman was experiencing anguish, psychological disorientation and intense pain during unassisted childbirth. Furthermore, the infant's father was nowhere to be found. Under such circumstances, the court decided to show leniency toward Hobbs and she was acquitted. She married Samuel Blackburn in 1912 (they later divorced) and died on September 30, 1952, having apparently had no more children.

== See also ==
- Winifred Carrick, another New Zealand woman acquitted of killing her child, in 1917.
- Infanticide in Nineteenth Century New Zealand
