= Daniel Cooper (murderer) =

New Zealand baby farmer and murderer (1881–1923)

- Born: Daniel Richard Cooper; 18 October 1881; Burns, Otago, New Zealand
- Died: 16 June 1923 (aged 41); Terrace Gaol, Wellington, New Zealand
- Cause of death: Execution by hanging
- Other name: "The Newlands Baby Farmer"
- Conviction: Murder
- Penalty: Death

Details
- Victims: 2–3
- Span of crimes: 1917–1922
- Country: New Zealand

Daniel Richard Cooper (18 October 1881 – 16 June 1923) of New Zealand was a convicted baby farmer, suspected serial killer, and illegal abortionist. In 1922, he was apprehended at a Wellington suburban property and in 1923 found guilty of murder and executed. His wife, Martha Elizabeth Cooper, was acquitted.

== Early life ==
Daniel Cooper was born to Elizabeth Ure and George Cooper, in Burns, Otago on 18 October 1881. Later in life, he became a builder. Cooper had two periods of contact with the police for theft, once in Oamaru in 1902, and again in Palmerston North in 1907. By 1907, he had settled in Awamangu, Otago and married Marion Burns. The couple were itinerant and shifted to New Plymouth and then Gore, Southland, in 1916. By then, Cooper had joined the Seventh-day Adventist Church and sold a booklet entitled The Practical Guide to Good Health.

Tragedy struck when Marion died on 18 July 1917, in her eighth month of pregnancy. Although the initial diagnosis was pericarditis, the New Zealand Police re-investigated the case in 1923, after Cooper was apprehended for suspected murder. Family friends expressed doubt about the circumstances of Marion's death; given that she was being treated for goitre with mercuric iodide, some argued that it was possible that Cooper had intentionally overdosed Marion with that medication.

== "The Newlands Baby Farmer" trial and execution ==
Given suspicions about his extracurricular activities occasioned by the death of his wife and other rumoured activities, Cooper was expelled from the Seventh-day Adventist Church of New Zealand on 2 January 1918, shortly after he had married his second wife, Martha (born 20 December 1893), a former book purchaser. Those rumoured activities may have included illegal abortion procedures. Cooper and Martha relocated one more time, to Newlands, a Wellington suburb, and set up an office in Lambton Quay, Wellington for their health activities in 1921. They ran a rest care and convalescent home for women, but the police raided the facility on 3 December 1922. The bodies of two newborn infants were found and Cooper and Martha were charged with murder, although Martha was later acquitted of any crime, given that there was no evidence that she had directly assisted her husband in his activities.

The trial of the "Newlands Baby Farmer" was then undertaken. Mary MacLeod, a former rest home occupant, came forth with a story about her pregnancy, which had started in February 1922. Given that MacLeod was a single woman, there would have been considerable social stigma attached to any pregnancy and childbirth. The Coopers allowed her to live at the care facility and promised her that her baby would be 'adopted' by a Palmerston North couple. On 12 October 1922 MacLeod gave birth to a daughter and was later told that the child had been adopted by the Palmerston North family. However, the infant had died and was buried elsewhere on the Newlands property, until it was discovered by police.

Like Minnie Dean almost thirty years before, Cooper was sentenced to death for the murder of the two infants. He was held in custody at Terrace Gaol in Wellington and executed there on 16 June 1923. His wife changed her name to Stewart, remarried and ultimately resettled in Christchurch, where she died in 1975.

== See also ==
- List of serial killers by country
- Minnie Dean, also executed for baby farming in 1895.
