= Female perversion =

Term coined by Estela V. Welldon

Female perversion is a term coined by Estela V. Welldon in 1992 to refer to women who commit violence, either against themselves or against others.

Though the term can be used pejoratively and sometimes has sexual connotations, its strict definition is an instance of human behavior that deviates from what is considered orthodox or normal, and it is in this sense that the term is used by psychologists. The term is also controversial as according to Welldon there is a prevailing denial of the existence of female violence, throughout the legal and mental health community.

== Model of female perversion ==
Welldon (1992) put forward a model of female perversion that introduced the term into the psychological nomenclature. The model covers several categories of violent behavior that can be directed at one's own body, against children, or against adults.

Freudian psychoanalytic theory suggested that perversion fell solely within the male domain, that it was related to the phallus, and that aggressive drive was unique to men. In her book Madonna, Whore: The Idealisation and Denigration of Motherhood, Welldon challenges this notion, and argues that women are equally capable of perversion. Though they do not use the penis with violence, they instead use the whole body.

In doing so, they attack the whole body, and sometimes by extension the bodies of children. They are symbolically wreaking revenge on their own internalised, often cruel and perverse mother. They identify their own body with the body of the mother. Likewise when they attack their children, they express violence towards a narcissistic extension of themselves (Motz, 2001)

The major forms it can manifest itself are

- self-harm
- eating disorders
- physical and sexual abuse of children
- infanticide
- Munchausen syndrome by proxy
- physical or sexual assault of others, including battered women who kill

Welldon argues that it can be seen as a form of sexualised aggression, and challenges the Freudian view that violence is a uniquely male phallic expression.

The reproductive functions and organs are used by both sexes to express perversion. Perverse men use their penises to attack and show hatred towards symbolic sources of humiliation..... If perversion in the man is focused through his penis, in the woman it will similarly expressed through her reproductive organs and the maternal representations of motherhood

(Welldon 1991)

Anna Motz, in her book The psychology of female violence suggests that the expression of this anger on the body or that of another is a communicative act, clearly sending a message of internal pain or of psychosis (Motz, 2001). She calls the message "the language of the body", and that the symbolic use of violence against the body can be likened to psychosomatic illness.

=== Violence against the self ===
Violence against the self can take several forms, including deprivation and starvation as is the case in anorexia nervosa and bulimia, self-injury or suicide attempts, or other forms of self-harm.

=== Violence against children ===
Violence against children often goes unreported, and is largely hidden from view. It can take the form of direct physical or sexual assault, Munchausen Syndrome by Proxy, or infanticide. Often the capacity of women to commit violence against children is denied, in the refusal to 'think the unthinkable'.

=== Violence against adults ===
Violence against others can take many forms, from domestic assault, physical assault, and when it escalates in the form of homicide and/or infanticide.
