= Anna Motz =

Psychologist

Anna Motz (born 1964) is a Consultant Clinical and Forensic Psychologist with extensive clinical experience with women as perpetrators of violence and with the staff teams who work with them. She is a former president of the International Association for Forensic Psychotherapy (IAFP).

She is the author of The Psychology of Female Violence: Crimes Against the Body. The book deals with the causes of violence in women, what can be done to help them and their victims and explores why society denies the fact of female violence. This book explores the nature and causes of female violence from the perspectives of psychodynamic theory and forensic psychology. The book explores recent high-profile cases of female violence, including the case of Victoria Climbié, the controversy related to the diagnosis of Münchausen syndrome by proxy, Dangerous and severe personality disorder in women, and the impact of pro-anorexia and pro-bulimia websites. It also explores other major topics, including the sexual and physical abuse of children by women, infanticide, fabricated and induced illness, and self-harm.

== Works ==
- Motz, Anna (2009). Managing self-harm: psychological perspectives. London: Routledge. ISBN 9781583917053.
- Motz, Anna (2010). The psychology of female violence: crimes against the body (2., repr ed.). London: Routledge. ISBN 9780415403870.
- Motz, Anna (2014). Toxic couples: the psychology of domestic violence (1. publ ed.). London: Routledge. ISBN 9780415588898.
- Motz, Anna; Dennis, Maxine; Aiyegbusi, Anne (2020). Invisible trauma: women, difference and the criminal justice system. London New York: Routledge, Taylor & Francis Group. ISBN 9781138218666.
- Motz, Anna (2023). A love that kills: stories of forensic psychology and female violence. London: Weidenfeld & Nicolson. ISBN 9781474624343.
- Motz, Anna (2024). If Love Could Kill: The Myths and Truths of Women Who Commit Violence. Knopf. ISBN 9780593534151.
