= Infanticide =

Intentional killing of human offspring

Infanticide (or infant homicide) is the intentional killing of infants or offspring. Infanticide was a widespread practice throughout human history that was mainly used to dispose of unwanted children, its main purpose being the prevention of resources being spent on weak or disabled offspring. Unwanted infants were usually abandoned to die of exposure, but in some societies they were deliberately killed. Infanticide is generally illegal, but in some places the practice is tolerated, or the prohibition is not strictly enforced.

Most Stone Age human societies routinely practiced infanticide, and estimates of children killed by infanticide in the Mesolithic and Neolithic eras vary from 15 to 50 percent. Infanticide continued to be common in most societies after the historical era began, including ancient Greece, ancient Rome, the Phoenicians, ancient China, ancient Japan, Pre-Islamic Arabia, early modern Europe, Aboriginal Australia, Native Americans, and Native Alaskans.

Infanticide became forbidden in the Near East during the 1st millennium. Christianity forbade infanticide from its earliest times, which led Constantine the Great and Valentinian I to ban infanticide across the Roman Empire in the 4th century. The practice ceased in Arabia in the 7th century after the founding of Islam, since the Quran prohibits infanticide. Infanticide of male babies had become uncommon in China by the Ming dynasty (1368–1644), whereas infanticide of female babies became more common during the One-Child Policy era (1979–2015). During the period of Company rule in India, the East India Company attempted to eliminate infanticide but were only partially successful, and female infanticide in some parts of India still continues. Infanticide is very rare in industrialised countries but may persist elsewhere.

Parental infanticide researchers have found that mothers are more likely to commit infanticide. In the special case of neonaticide (murder in the first 24 hours of life), mothers account for almost all the perpetrators. Fatherly cases of neonaticide are so rare that they are individually recorded.

== History ==
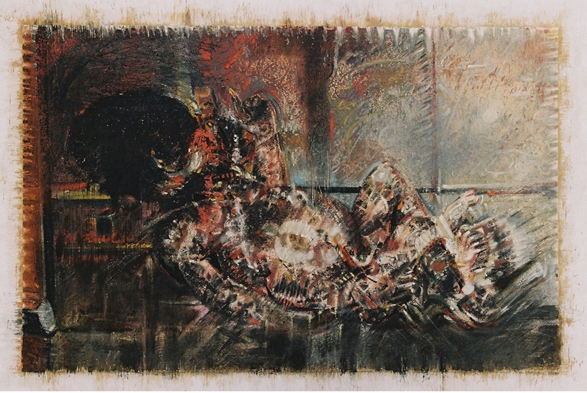
Infanticidio by Mexican artist Antonio García Vega

The practice of infanticide has taken many forms over time. Child sacrifice to supernatural figures or forces, such as that believed to have been practiced in ancient Carthage, may be only the most notorious example in the ancient world.

A frequent method of infanticide in ancient Europe and Asia was simply to abandon the infant, leaving it to die by exposure (i.e., hypothermia, hunger, thirst, or animal attack).

On at least one island in Oceania, infanticide was carried out until the 20th century by suffocating the infant, while in pre-Columbian Mesoamerica and in the Inca Empire it was carried out by sacrifice (see below).

A minority of academics subscribe to an alternate school of thought, considering the practice as "early infanticidal childrearing". They attribute parental infanticidal wishes to massive projection or displacement of the parents' unconscious onto the child, because of intergenerational, ancestral abuse by their own parents. Clearly, an infanticidal parent may have multiple motivations, conflicts, emotions, and thoughts about their baby and their relationship with their baby, which are often colored both by their individual psychology, current relational context and attachment history, and, perhaps most saliently, their psychopathology Almeida, Merminod, and Schechter suggest that parents with fantasies, projections, and delusions involving infanticide need to be taken seriously and assessed carefully, whenever possible, by an interdisciplinary team that includes infant mental health specialists or mental health practitioners who have experience in working with parents, children, and families.

=== Paleolithic and Neolithic ===
Many Neolithic groups routinely resorted to infanticide in order to control their numbers so that their lands could support them. Joseph Birdsell believed that infanticide rates in prehistoric times were between 15% and 50% of the total number of births, while Laila Williamson estimated a lower rate ranging from 15% to 20%. Both anthropologists believed that these high rates of infanticide persisted until the development of agriculture during the Neolithic Revolution. A book published in 1981 stated that comparative anthropologists estimated that 50% of female newborn babies may have been killed by their parents during the Paleolithic era. The anthropologist Raymond Dart has interpreted fractures on the skulls of hominid infants (e.g. the Taung Child) as due to deliberate killing followed by cannibalism, but such explanations are by now considered uncertain and possibly wrong. Children were not necessarily actively killed, but neglect and intentional malnourishment may also have occurred, as proposed by Vicente Lull as an explanation for an apparent surplus of men and the below average height of women in prehistoric Menorca.

=== In ancient history ===
==== In the New World ====
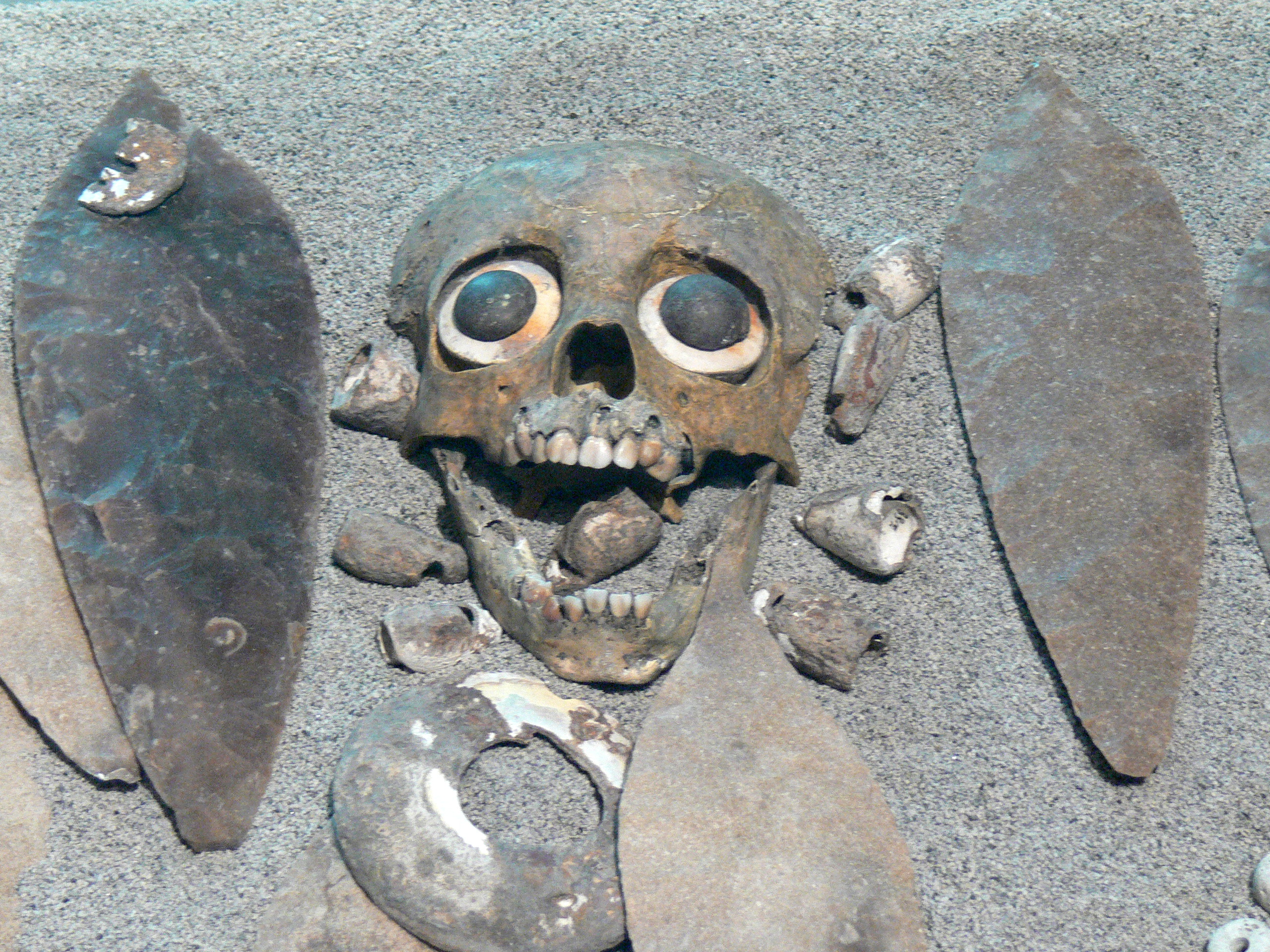
Skeletal remains of children from a ritual sacrifice discovered at Tlatelolco, exhibited at the National Museum of Anthropology in Mexico City.

Archaeologists have uncovered physical evidence of child sacrifice at several locations. Some of the best attested examples are the diverse rites which were part of the religious practices in Mesoamerica and the Inca Empire.

==== In the Old World ====
Three thousand bones of young children, with evidence of sacrificial rituals, have been found in Sardinia. Pelasgians offered a sacrifice of every tenth child during difficult times. Many remains of children have been found in Gezer excavations with signs of sacrifice. Child skeletons with the marks of sacrifice have been found also in Egypt dating 950–720 BCE. Child sacrifice was particularly widespread in ancient Carthage. Besides the Carthaginians, other Phoenicians, and the Canaanites, Moabites and Sepharvites offered their first-born as a sacrifice to their gods.

==== Ancient Egypt ====
In Egyptian households, at all social levels, children of both sexes were valued and there is no evidence of infanticide. The religion of the ancient Egyptians forbade infanticide and during the Greco-Roman period they rescued abandoned babies from manure heaps, a common method of infanticide by Greeks or Romans, and were allowed to either adopt them as foundling or raise them as slaves, often giving them names such as "copro -" to memorialize their rescue. Strabo considered it a peculiarity of the Egyptians that every child must be reared. Diodorus indicates infanticide was a punishable offence. Egypt was heavily dependent on the annual flooding of the Nile to irrigate the land and in years of low inundation, severe famine could occur with breakdowns in social order resulting, notably between 930–1070 CE and 1180–1350 CE. Instances of cannibalism are recorded during these periods, but it is unknown if this happened during the pharaonic era of ancient Egypt. Beatrix Midant-Reynes describes human sacrifice as having occurred at Abydos in the early dynastic period (c. 3150–2850 BCE), while Jan Assmann asserts there is no clear evidence of human sacrifice ever happening in ancient Egypt.

==== Carthage ====
According to Shelby Brown, Carthaginians, descendants of the Phoenicians, sacrificed infants to their gods. Charred bones of hundreds of infants have been found in Carthaginian archaeological sites. One such area harbored as many as 20,000 burial urns. Skeptics suggest that the bodies of children found in Carthaginian and Phoenician cemeteries were merely the cremated remains of children who died naturally.

Plutarch (c. 46–120 CE) mentions the practice, as do Tertullian, Orosius, Diodorus Siculus and Philo. The Hebrew Bible also mentions what appears to be child sacrifice practiced at a place called the Tophet (from the Hebrew taph or toph, to burn) by the Canaanites. Writing in the 3rd century BCE, Kleitarchos, one of the historians of Alexander the Great, described that the infants rolled into the flaming pit. Diodorus Siculus wrote that babies were roasted to death inside the burning pit of the god Baal Hamon, a bronze statue.

==== Greece and Rome ====
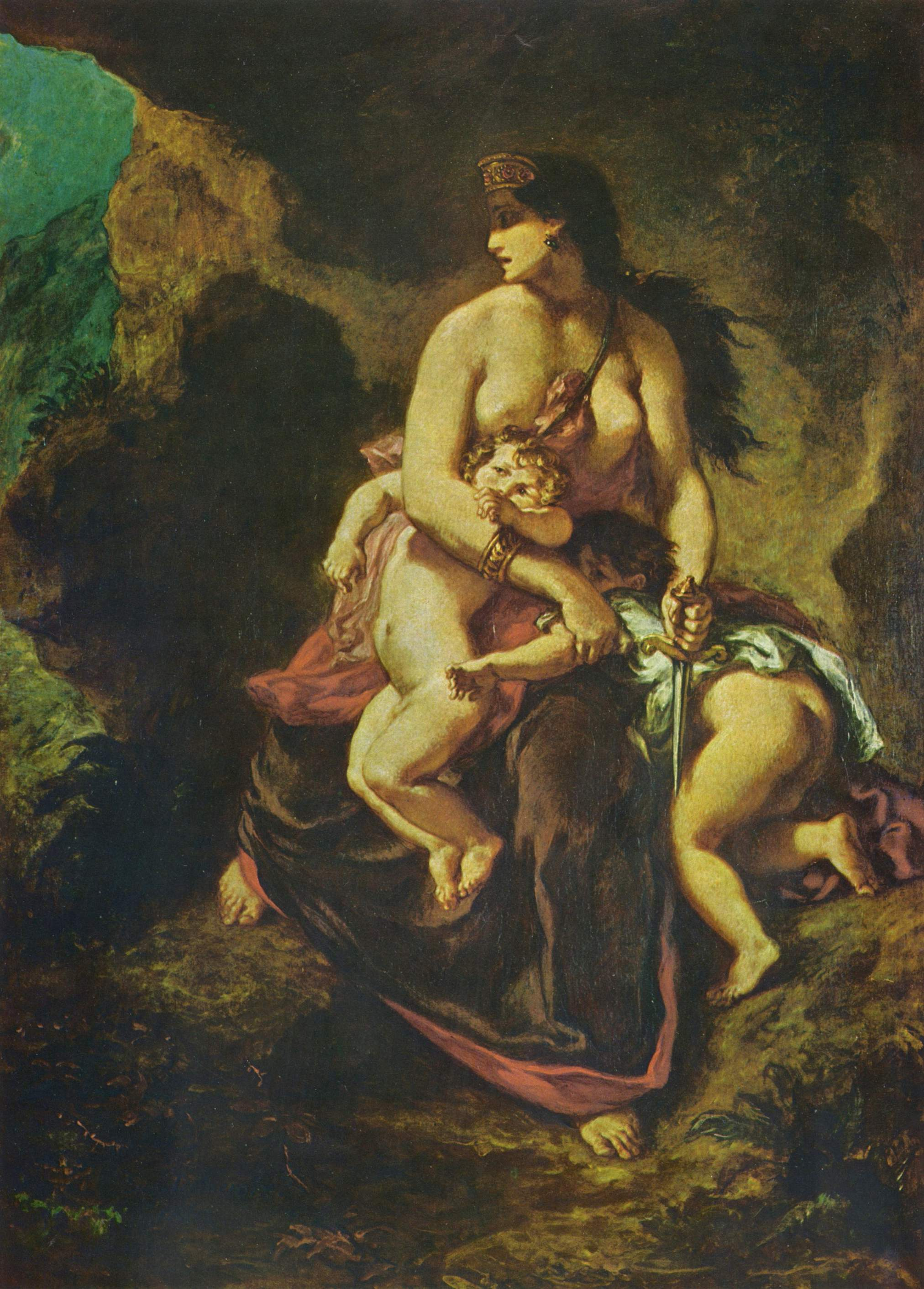
Medea killing her sons, by Eugène Ferdinand Victor Delacroix (1862)

The historical Greeks considered the practice of adult and child sacrifice barbarous, however, infant exposure was widely practiced in ancient Greece. It was advocated by Aristotle in the case of congenital deformity: "As to the exposure of children, let there be a law that no deformed child shall live."

In Greece, the decision to expose a child was typically the father's, although in Sparta the decision was made by a group of elders. Exposure was the preferred method of disposal, as that act in itself was not considered to be murder; moreover, the exposed child technically had a chance of being rescued by the gods or any passersby. This very situation was a recurring motif in Greek mythology.

The practice was prevalent in ancient Rome, as well. Philo was the first known philosopher to speak out against it. A letter from a Roman citizen to his sister, or a pregnant wife from her husband, dating from 1 BCE, demonstrates the casual nature with which infanticide was often viewed:

I am still in Alexandria ... I beg and plead with you to take care of our little child, and as soon as we receive wages, I will send them to you. In the meantime, if (good fortune to you!) you give birth, if it is a boy, let it live; if it is a girl, expose it.

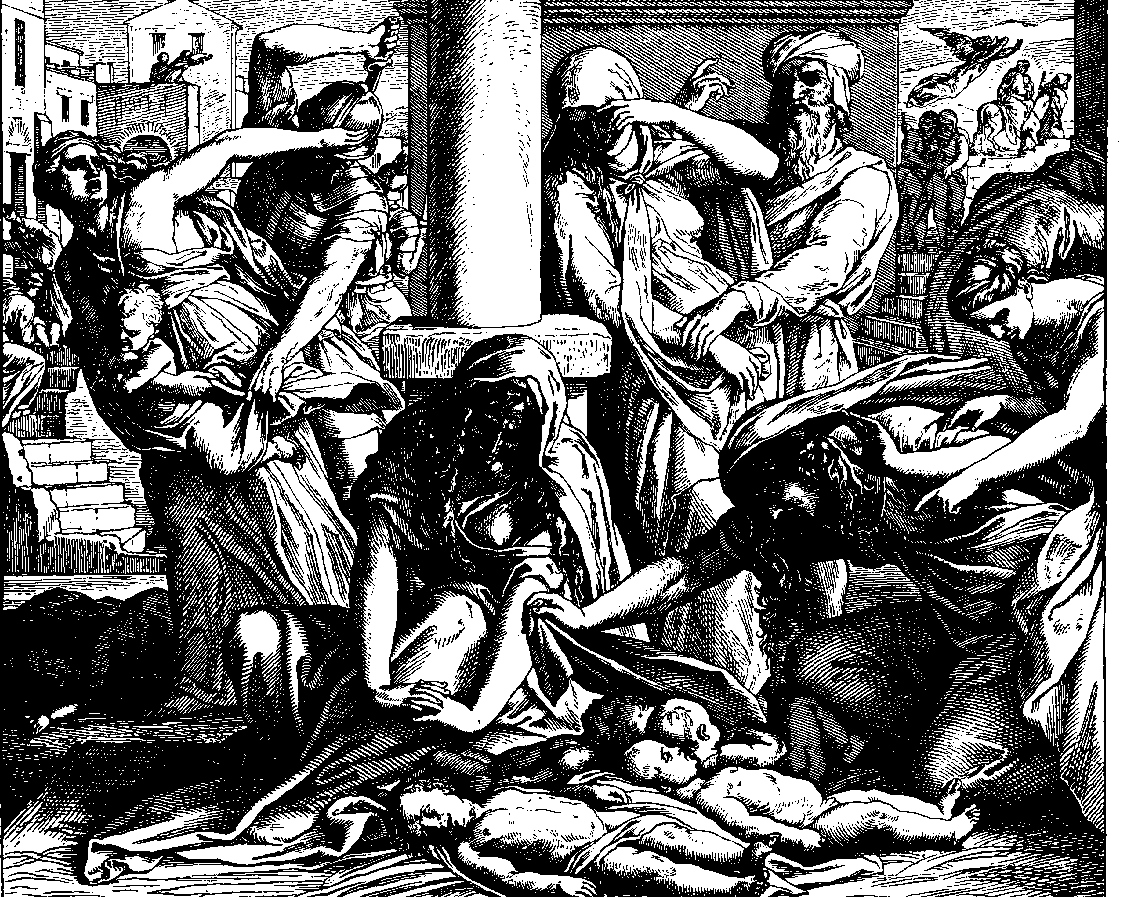
Massacre of the Innocents by Julius Schnorr von Karolsfeld, 1860

In some periods of Roman history it was traditional for a newborn to be brought to the pater familias, the family patriarch, who would then decide whether the child was to be kept and raised, or left to die by exposure. The Twelve Tables of Roman law obliged him to put to death a child that was visibly deformed. The concurrent practices of slavery and infanticide contributed to the "background noise" of the crises during the Republic.

Infanticide became a capital offense in Roman law in 374, but offenders were rarely, if ever, prosecuted.

According to mythology, Romulus and Remus, twin infant sons of the war god Mars, survived near-infanticide after being tossed into the Tiber River. According to the myth, they were raised by wolves, and later founded the city of Rome.

==== Middle Ages ====
Whereas theologians and clerics preached sparing their lives, newborn abandonment continued as registered in both the literature record and in legal documents. According to William Lecky, exposure in the early Middle Ages, as distinct from other forms of infanticide, "was practiced on a gigantic scale with absolute impunity, noticed by writers with most frigid indifference and, at least in the case of destitute parents, considered a very venial offence". However the first foundling house in Europe was established in Milan in 787 on account of the high number of infanticides and out-of-wedlock births. The Hospital of the Holy Spirit in Rome was founded by Pope Innocent III because women were throwing their infants into the Tiber river.

Unlike other European regions, in the Middle Ages the German mother had the right to expose the newborn. Generally, unwanted children were often abandoned in the High Middle Ages, usually by leaving them at the door of a church or abbey. If the baby was found in time, the clergy would take care of their upbringing, which gave rise to the first orphanages.

However, very high sex ratios were common in even late medieval Europe, which may indicate sex-selective infanticide. The Waldensians, a pre-Reformation medieval Christian sect deemed heretical by the Catholic Church, were accused of participating in infanticide.

==== Judaism ====
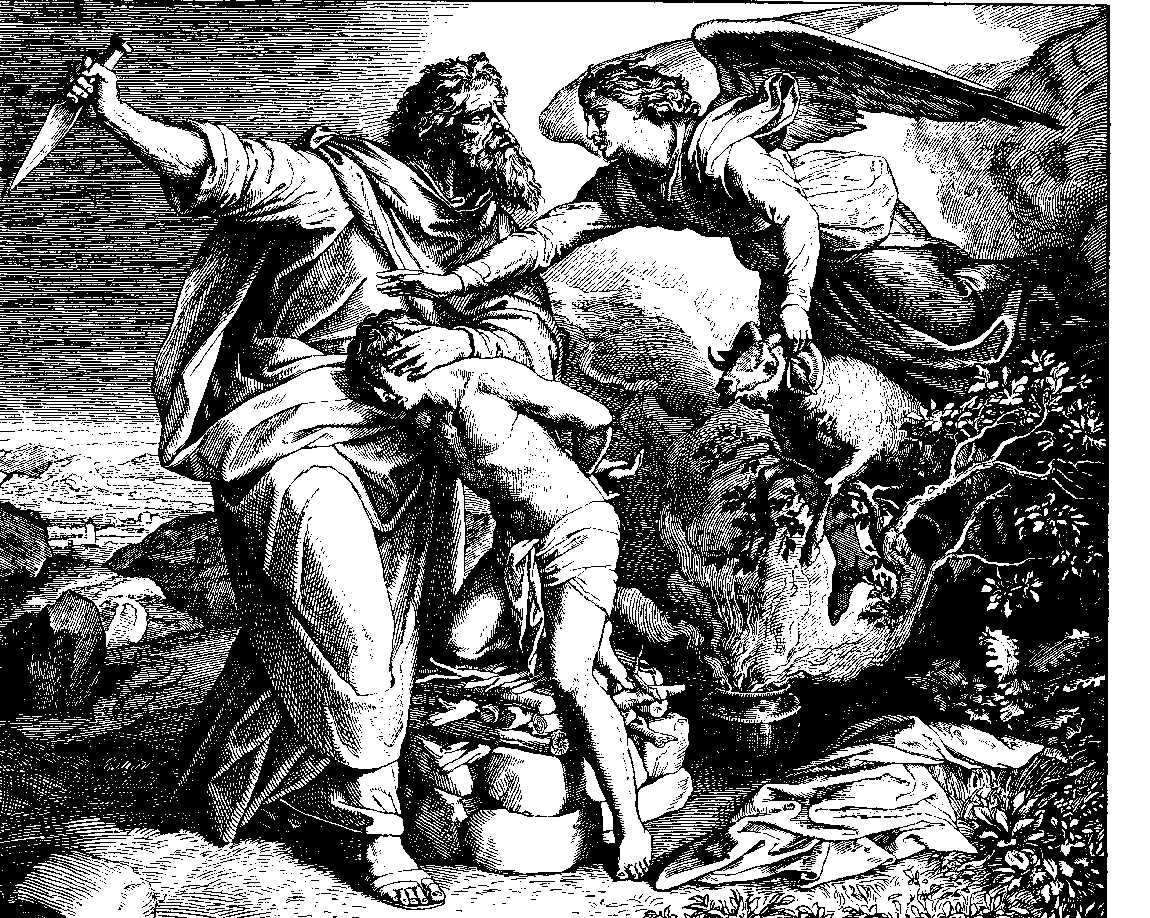
In this depiction of the Binding of Isaac by Julius Schnorr von Karolsfeld, 1860, Abraham is shown not sacrificing Isaac.

Judaism prohibits infanticide, and has for some time, dating back to at least the early Common Era. Roman historians wrote about the ideas and customs of other peoples, which often diverged from their own. Tacitus recorded that the Jews "take thought to increase their numbers, for they regard it as a crime to kill any late-born children". Josephus, whose works give an important insight into 1st-century Judaism, wrote that God "forbids women to cause abortion of what is begotten, or to destroy it afterward".

==== Pagan European tribes ====
In his book Germania, Tacitus wrote in 98 CE that the ancient Germanic tribes enforced a similar prohibition. He found such mores remarkable and commented: "To restrain generation and the increase of children, is esteemed [by the Germans] an abominable sin, as also to kill infants newly born." It has become clear over the millennia, though, that Tacitus' description was inaccurate; the consensus of modern scholarship significantly differs. John Boswell believed that in ancient Germanic tribes unwanted children were exposed, usually in the forest. "It was the custom of the [Teutonic] pagans, that if they wanted to kill a son or daughter, they would be killed before they had been given any food." Usually children born out of wedlock were disposed of that way.

In his highly influential Pre-historic Times, John Lubbock described burnt bones indicating the practice of child sacrifice in pagan Britain.

=== Christianity ===
Christianity explicitly rejects infanticide. The Teachings of the Apostles or Didache states "thou shalt not kill a child by abortion, neither shalt thou slay it when born". The Epistle of Barnabas makes a similar statement. Early Christian writers such as Tertullian, Athenagoras, Minucius Felix, Justin Martyr and Lactantius also maintained that exposing a baby to death was a wicked act. In 318, Constantine I considered infanticide a crime, and in 374, Valentinian I mandated the rearing of all children (exposing babies, especially girls, was still common). The Council of Constantinople declared that infanticide was homicide, and in 589, the Third Council of Toledo took measures against the custom of killing their own children. Christianity thus played a leading role in the abolition of infanticide in the Roman Empire.

=== Arabia ===
Some Muslim sources allege that pre-Islamic Arabian society practiced infanticide as a form of "post-partum birth control". The word waʾd was used to describe the practice. These sources state that infanticide was practiced either out of destitution (thus practiced on males and females alike), or as "disappointment and fear of social disgrace felt by a father upon the birth of a daughter".

Some authors believe that there is little evidence that infanticide was prevalent in pre-Islamic Arabia or early Muslim history, except for the case of the Tamim tribe, who practiced it during severe famine according to Islamic sources. Others state that "female infanticide was common all over Arabia during this period of time" (pre-Islamic Arabia), especially by burying alive a female newborn. A tablet discovered in Yemen, forbidding the people of a certain town from engaging in the practice, is the only written reference to infanticide within the peninsula in pre-Islamic times.

=== Islam ===
Infanticide is explicitly prohibited by the Qur'an. "And do not kill your children for fear of poverty; We give them sustenance and yourselves too; surely to kill them is a great wrong." Together with polytheism and homicide, infanticide is regarded as a grave sin (see 6:151 and 60:12). Infanticide is also implicitly denounced in the story of Pharaoh's slaughter of the male children of Israelites (see 2:49; 7:127; 7:141; 14:6; 28:4; 40:25).

=== Ukraine and Russia ===
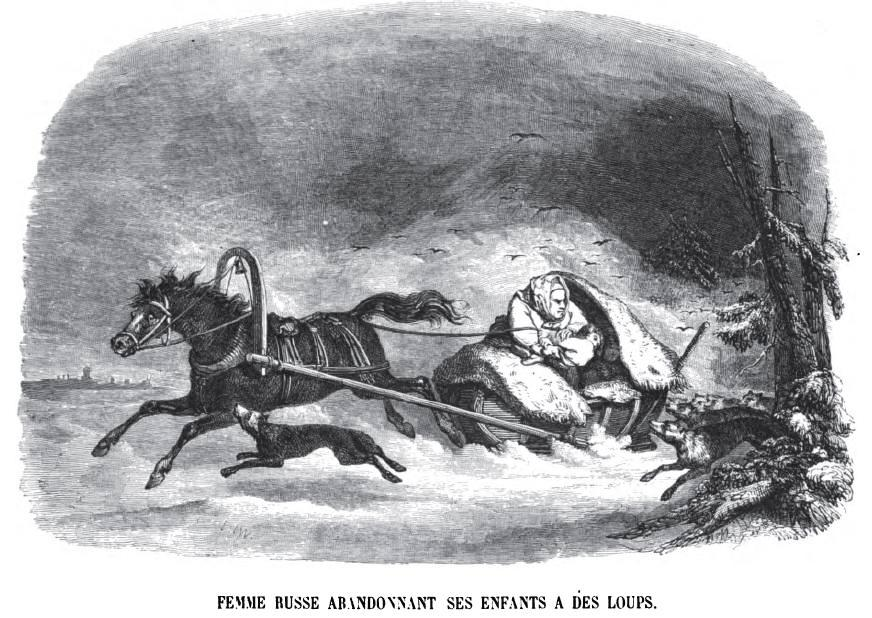
Femme Russe abandonnant ses enfants à des loups ("Russian Woman Abandoning Her Children to the Wolves"). Charles-Michel Geoffroy, 1845

Infanticide may have been practiced as human sacrifice, as part of the pagan cult of Perun. Ibn Fadlan describes sacrificial practices at the time of his trip to Kiev Rus (present-day Ukraine) in 921–922, and describes an incident of a woman voluntarily sacrificing her life as part of a funeral rite for a prominent leader, but makes no mention of infanticide. The Primary Chronicle, one of the most important literary sources before the 12th century, indicates that human sacrifice to idols may have been introduced by Vladimir the Great in 980. The same Vladimir the Great formally converted Kiev Rus into Christianity just 8 years later, but pagan cults continued to be practiced clandestinely in remote areas as late as the 13th century.

American explorer George Kennan noted that among the Koryaks, a people of north-eastern Siberia, infanticide was still common in the nineteenth century. One of a pair of twins was always sacrificed.

=== Great Britain ===
Infanticide (as a crime) gained both popular and bureaucratic significance in Victorian Britain. By the mid-19th century, in the context of criminal lunacy and the insanity defence, killing one's own child(ren) attracted ferocious debate, as the role of women in society was defined by motherhood, and it was thought that any woman who murdered her own child was by definition insane and could not be held responsible for her actions. Several cases were subsequently highlighted during the Royal Commission on Capital Punishment 1864–66, as a particular felony where an effective avoidance of the death penalty had informally begun.

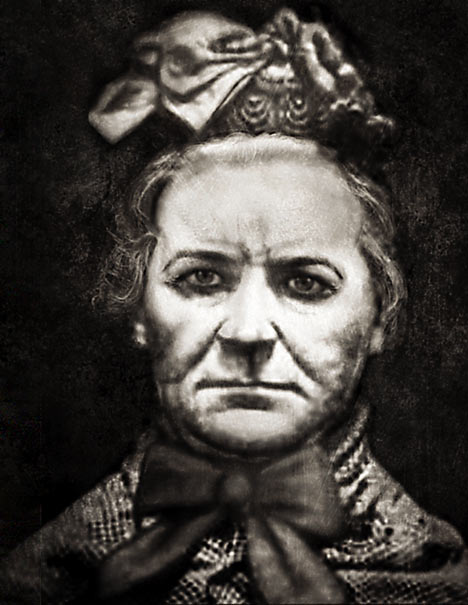
Baby killer Amelia Dyer (pictured upon entry to Wells Asylum in 1893). Her trial led to stricter laws for adoption and raised the profile of the fledgling National Society for the Prevention of Cruelty to Children (NSPCC) which formed in 1884.

The Poor Law Amendment Act 1834 ended parish relief for unmarried mothers and allowed fathers of illegitimate children to avoid paying for "child support". Unmarried mothers then received little assistance, and the poor were left with the option of either entering the workhouse, turning to prostitution, resorting to infanticide, or choosing abortion. By the middle of the century infanticide was common for social reasons, such as illegitimacy, and the introduction of child life insurance additionally encouraged some women to kill their children for gain. Examples include Mary Ann Cotton, who murdered many of her 15 children as well as three husbands; Margaret Waters, the 'Brixton Baby Farmer', a professional baby-farmer who was found guilty of infanticide in 1870; Jessie King, who was hanged in 1889; Amelia Dyer, the 'Angel Maker', who murdered over 400 babies in her care; and Ada Chard-Williams, a baby farmer who was later hanged at Newgate prison.

The Times reported that 67 infants were murdered in London in 1861 and 150 more recorded as "found dead", many of which were found on the streets. Another 250 were suffocated, half of them not recorded as accidental deaths. The report noted that "infancy in London has to creep into life in the midst of foes."

Recording a birth as a still-birth was also another way of concealing infanticide because still-births did not need to be registered until 1926 and they did not need to be buried in public cemeteries. In 1895 The Sun (London) published the article, "Massacre of the Innocents", highlighting the dangers of baby-farming, the recording of stillbirths, and quoting Athelstan Braxton Hicks, the London coroner, on lying-in houses:

I have not the slightest doubt that a large amount of crime is covered by the expression 'still-birth'. There are a large number of cases of what are called newly-born children, which are found all over England, more especially in London and large towns, abandoned in streets, rivers, on commons, and so on... [A] great deal of that crime is due to what are called lying-in houses, which are not registered, or under the supervision of that sort, where the people who act as midwives constantly, as soon as the child is born, either drop it into a pail of water or smother it with a damp cloth. It is a very common thing, also, to find that they bash their heads on the floor and break their skulls.

The last British woman to be executed for infanticide of her own child was Rebecca Smith, who was hanged in Wiltshire in 1849.

The Infant Life Protection Act 1897 required local authorities to be notified within 48 hours of changes in custody or the death of children under seven years. Under the Children Act 1908 "no infant could be kept in a home that was so unfit and so overcrowded as to endanger its health, and no infant could be kept by an unfit nurse who threatened, by neglect or abuse, its proper care, and maintenance."

Instances of infanticide in Britain in the 18th and 19th centuries are often attributed to the economic position of the women, with juries committing "pious perjury" in many subsequent murder cases. The knowledge of the difficulties faced in the 18th century by those women who attempted to keep their children can be seen as a reason for juries to show compassion. If the woman chose to keep the child, society was not set up to ease the pressure placed upon the woman, legally, socially or economically. In mid-18th century Britain there was assistance available for women who were not able to raise their children. The Foundling Hospital opened in 1756 and was able to take in some of the illegitimate children. However, the conditions within the hospital caused Parliament to withdraw funding and the governors to live off of their own incomes. This resulted in a stringent entrance policy, with the committee requiring that the hospital:

Will not receive a child that is more than a year old, nor the child of a domestic servant, nor any child whose father can be compelled to maintain it.

Once a mother had admitted her child to the hospital, the hospital did all it could to ensure that the parent and child were not re-united. MacFarlane argues in Illegitimacy and Illegitimates in Britain (1980) that English society greatly concerned itself with the burden that a bastard child places upon its communities and had gone to some lengths to ensure that the father of the child is identified in order to maintain its well-being. Assistance could be gained through maintenance payments from the father, however, this was capped "at a miserable 2 s and 6 d a week". If the father fell behind with the payments he could only be asked "to pay a maximum of 13 weeks arrears".

Despite the accusations of some that women were getting a free hand-out, there is evidence that many women were far from receiving adequate assistance from their parish. "Within Leeds in 1822 ... relief was limited to 1 s per week". Sheffield required women to enter the workhouse, whereas Halifax gave no relief to the women who required it. The prospect of entering the workhouse was certainly something to be avoided. Lionel Rose quotes Joseph Rogers in Massacre of the Innocents. Rogers, who was employed by a London workhouse in 1856, stated that conditions in the nursery were 'wretchedly damp and miserable ... [and] ... overcrowded with young mothers and their infants'.

The loss of social standing for a servant girl was a particular problem in respect of producing a bastard child as they relied upon a good character reference in order to maintain their job and more importantly, to get a new or better job. In a large number of trials for the crime of infanticide, it is the servant girl that stood accused. The disadvantage of being a servant girl is that they had to live to the social standards of their superiors or risk dismissal and no references. Whereas within other professions, such as in the factory, the relationship between employer and employee was much more anonymous and the mother would be better able to make other provisions, such as employing a minder. The result of the lack of basic social care in Britain in the 18th and 19th century is the numerous accounts in court records of women, particularly servant girls, standing trial for the murder of their child.

There may have been no specific offense of infanticide in England before about 1623 because infanticide was a matter for the by ecclesiastical courts, possibly because infant mortality from natural causes was high (about 15% or one in six). Thereafter the accusation of the suppression of bastard children by lewd mothers was a crime incurring the presumption of guilt.

=== Asia ===
==== China ====
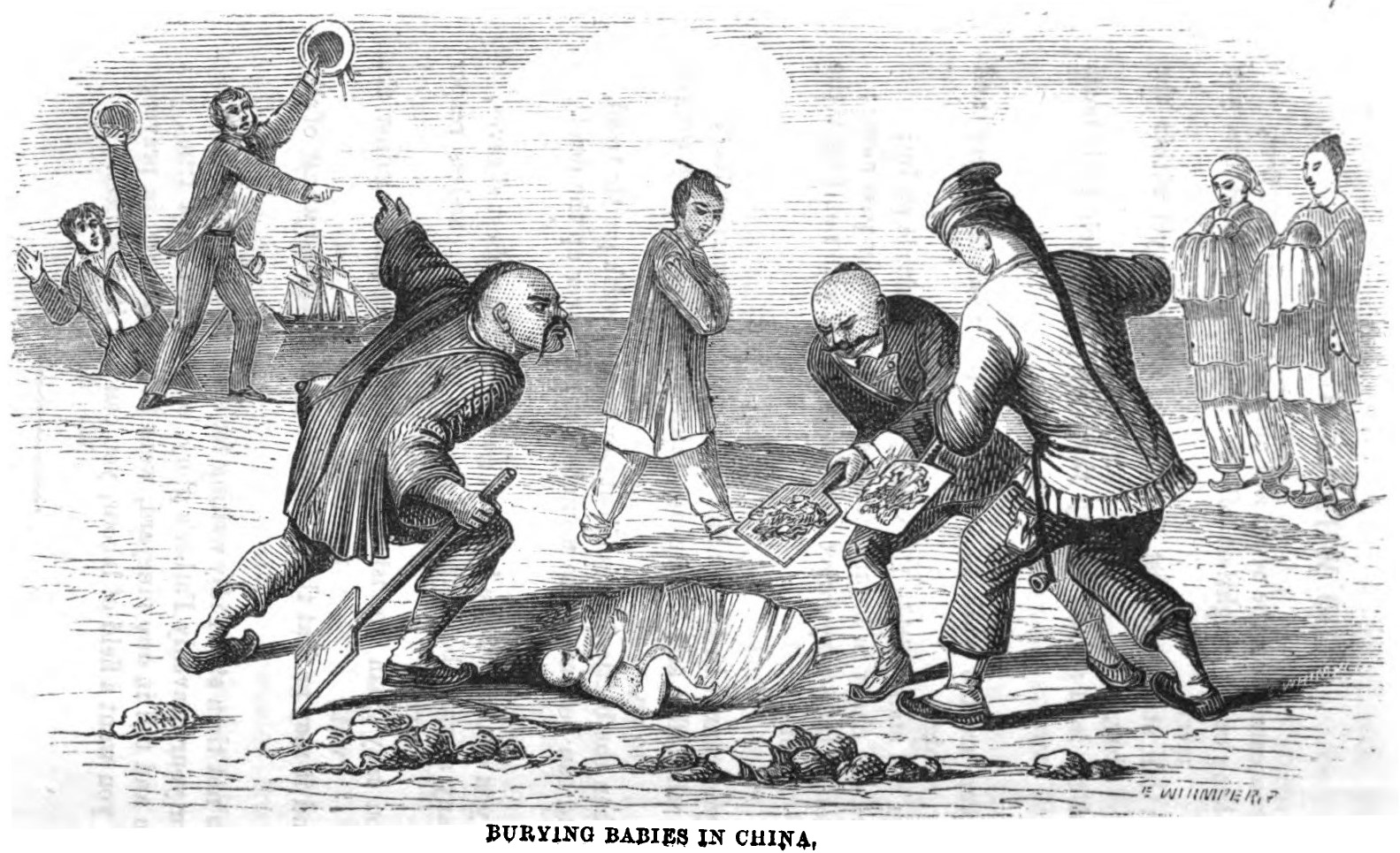
Burying Babies in China (p. 40, March 1865, XXII)

As of the 3rd century BC, short of execution, the harshest penalties were imposed on practitioners of infanticide by the legal codes of the Qin dynasty and Han dynasty of ancient China.

China's society practiced sex selective infanticide. Philosopher Han Fei Tzu, a member of the ruling aristocracy of the 3rd century BCE, who developed a school of law, wrote: "As to children, a father and mother when they produce a boy congratulate one another, but when they produce a girl they put it to death." Among the Hakka people, and in Yunnan, Anhui, Sichuan, Jiangxi and Fujian a method of killing the baby was to put her into a bucket of cold water, which was called "baby water".

Infanticide was reported as early as the 3rd century BCE, and, by the Song dynasty (960–1279 CE), it was widespread in some provinces. Belief in reincarnation allowed poor residents of the country to kill their newborn children if they felt unable to care for them, hoping that they would be reborn in better circumstances. Furthermore, 18th and 19th century Qing reports of villagers in Liaoning show that they did not consider newborn children fully human, instead regarding life as beginning at some point after the sixth month after birth.

The Venetian explorer Marco Polo claimed to have seen newborns exposed in Manzi. Contemporary writers from the Song dynasty note that, in Hubei and Fujian provinces, residents would only keep three sons and two daughters (among poor farmers, two sons and one daughter), and kill all babies beyond that number at birth. Initially the sex of the child was only one factor to consider. By the time of the Ming dynasty, however (1368–1644), male infanticide was becoming increasingly uncommon. The prevalence of female infanticide remained high much longer. The magnitude of this practice is subject to some dispute; however, one commonly quoted estimate is that, by late Qing, between one fifth and one-quarter of all newborn girls, across the entire social spectrum, were victims of infanticide. If one includes excess mortality among female children under 10 (ascribed to gender-differential neglect), the share of victims rises to one third.

Scottish physician John Dudgeon, who worked in Peking, China, during the early 20th century said that, "Infanticide does not prevail to the extent so generally believed among us, and in the north, it does not exist at all."

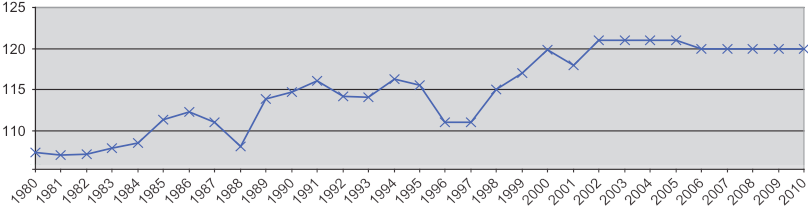
Sex ratio at birth in mainland China, males per 100 females, 1980–2010

Sex-selected abortion or sex identification (unless needed for medical reasons), abandonment, and infanticide are illegal in present-day mainland China. According to the US State Department and the human rights organization Amnesty International, China's former family planning program, called the one-child policy (which was later relaxed and fully abandoned in 2021), nevertheless increased the frequency of infanticide. The sex gap between males and females aged 0–19 years old was estimated to be 25 million in 2010 by the United Nations Population Fund. In some cases, in order to avoid China's family planning programs, parents did not report a birth to the government, so the newborn (in most cases a girl) did not receive an official identity and the parents could register another, later-born child without fines or punishment. In 2017, the government announced that all children without an identity could now have a legal identity, known as family register. Four years later, all restrictions on the number of children were abandoned.

==== Japan ====
Since feudal Edo era Japan the common slang for infanticide was mabiki (間引き), which means to pull plants from an overcrowded garden. A typical method in Japan was smothering the baby's mouth and nose with wet paper. It became common as a method of population control. Farmers would often kill their second or third sons. Daughters were usually spared, as they could be married off, sold off as servants or prostitutes, or sent off to become geishas. Mabiki persisted in the 19th century and early 20th century. According to one estimate, at least 97% of homicide victims in Japan in 1900 were newborns. To bear twins was perceived as barbarous and unlucky and efforts were made to hide or kill one or both twins.

==== South Asia ====
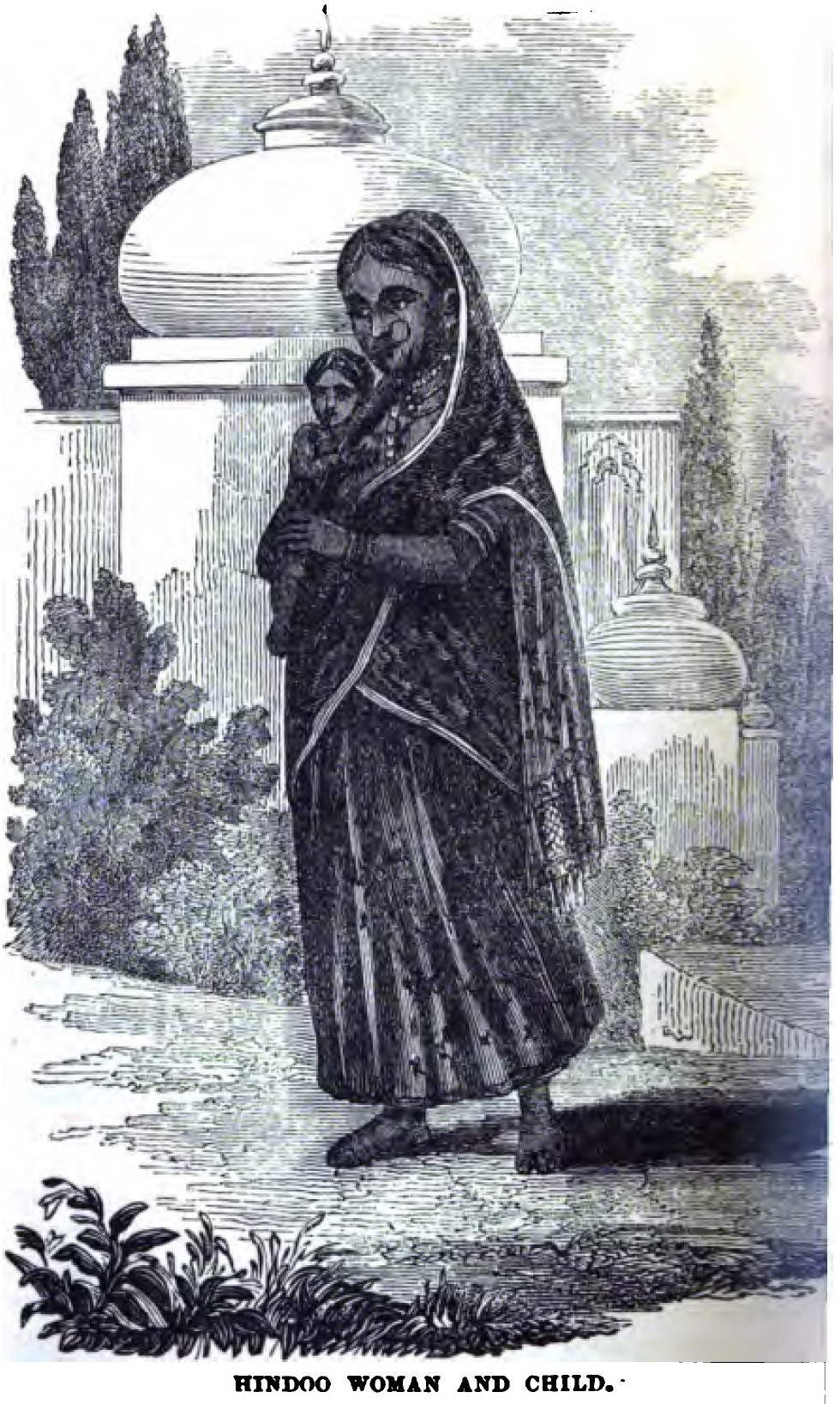
Hindu Woman carrying her child to be drowned in the River Ganges at Bengal (1852)

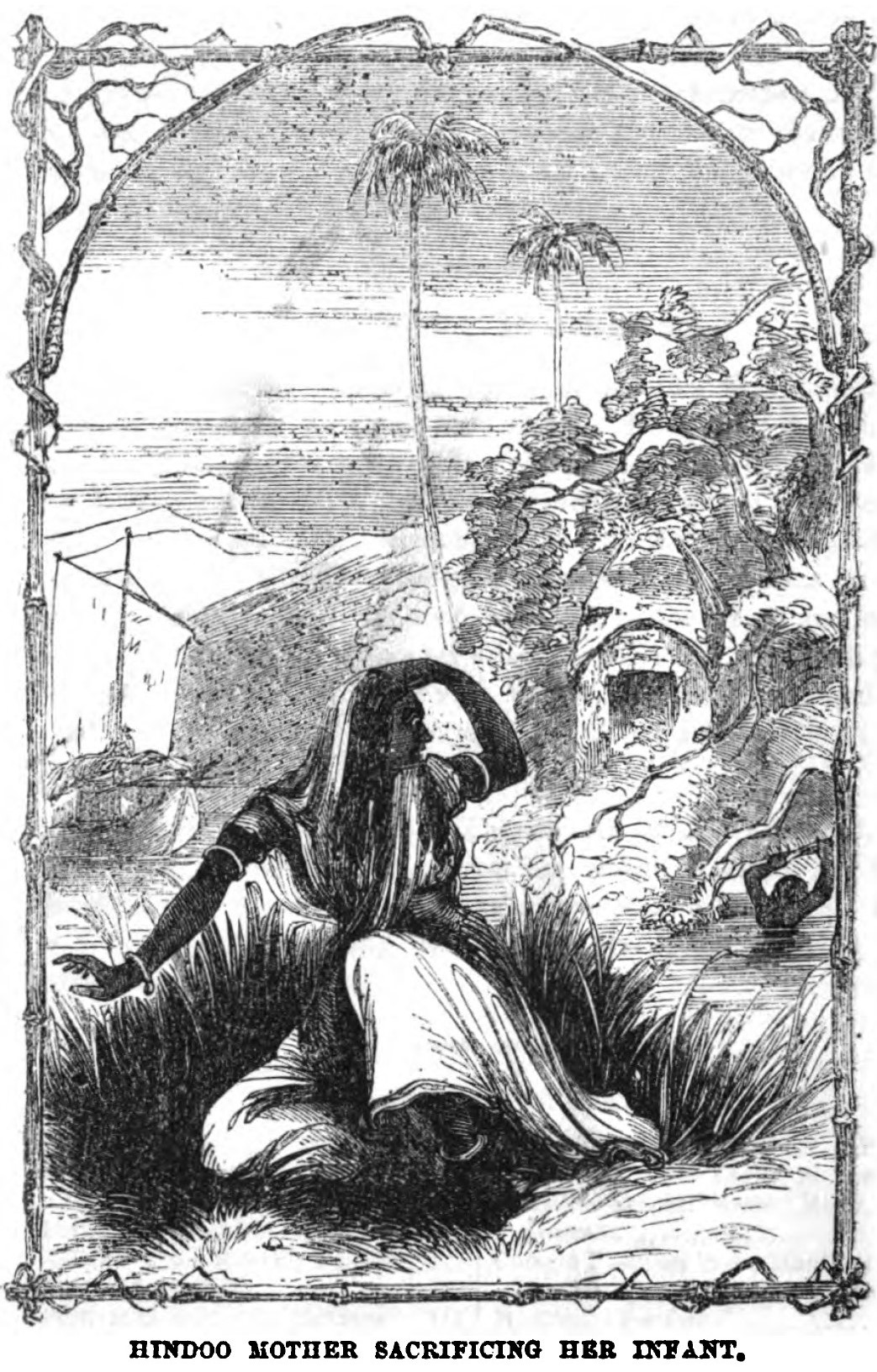
Hindoo Mother Sacrificing her infant (November 1853, X, p. 120)

Female infanticide of newborn girls was systematic in feudatory Rajputs in South Asia for illegitimate female children during the Middle Ages. According to Firishta, as soon as the illegitimate female child was born she was held "in one hand, and a knife in the other, that any person who wanted a wife might take her now, otherwise she was immediately put to death". The practice of female infanticide was also common among the Kutch, Kehtri, Nagar, Bengal, Miazed, Kalowries and Sindh communities.

It was not uncommon that parents threw a child to the sharks in the Ganges River as a sacrificial offering. The East India Company administration were unable to outlaw the custom until the beginning of the 19th century.

According to social activists, female infanticide has remained a problem in India into the 21st century, with both NGOs and the government conducting awareness campaigns to combat it.

=== Africa ===
In some African societies some neonates were killed because of beliefs in evil omens or because they were considered unlucky. Twins were usually put to death in Arebo; as well as by the Nama people of South West Africa; in the Lake Victoria Nyanza region; by the Tswana in Portuguese East Africa; in some parts of Igboland, Nigeria, twins were sometimes abandoned in a forest at birth (as depicted in Things Fall Apart), oftentimes one twin was killed or hidden by midwives of wealthier mothers; and by the ǃKung people of the Kalahari Desert.

The Kikuyu, Kenya's most populous ethnic group, practiced ritual killing of twins. Infanticide is rooted in the old traditions and beliefs prevailing all over Kenya. A survey conducted by Disability Rights International found that 45% of women interviewed by them in Kenya were pressured to kill their children born with disabilities. The pressure is much higher in the rural areas, with every two mothers out of three being forced to kill their disabled child.

=== Australia ===
Estimations of the prevalence of infanticide among Aboriginal Australians vary widely. Many early European settlers considered it to be extremely common. For example, an 1866 issue of The Australian News for Home Readers informed readers that "the crime of infanticide is so prevalent amongst the natives that it is rare to see an infant". In later times, attitudes shifted and the issue became contested. Author Susanna de Vries said in 2007 that her accounts of Aboriginal violence, including infanticide, were censored by publishers in the 1980s and 1990s. She told reporters that the censorship "stemmed from guilt over the stolen children question". Keith Windschuttle weighed in on the conversation, saying this type of censorship started in the 1970s. In the same article Louis Nowra suggested that infanticide in customary Aboriginal law may have been because it was difficult to keep an abundant number of Aboriginal children alive; there were life-and-death decisions modern-day Australians no longer have to face.

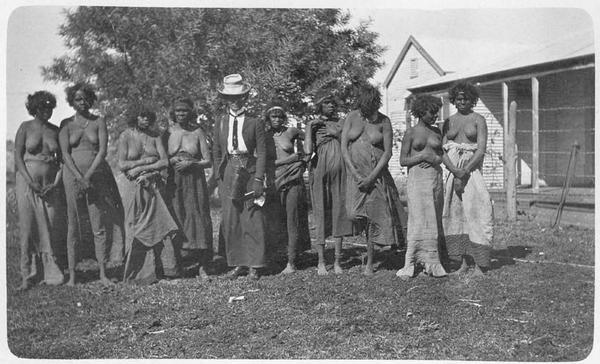
Daisy Bates with a group of Aboriginal women, circa 1911

Liz Conor's 2016 work, Skin Deep: Settler Impressions of Aboriginal Women, a culmination of 10 years of research, found that stories about Aboriginal women were told through a colonial lens of racism and misogyny. Vague stories of infanticide and cannibalism were repeated as reliable facts, and sometimes originated in accounts told by members of rival tribes about the other. She also refers to Daisy Bates' now contested accounts of such practices, reproaching some historians for accepting them too uncritically.

Anthropologists Ronald and Catherine Berndt note that "infanticide does seem to have been practised occasionally almost all over Aboriginal Australia, but it cannot have been so frequent as Taplin ... and Bates ... suggest", while also cautioning that others "underestimated" its prevalence. The flesh of killed infants was sometimes eaten, but this was not always the case. Usually only parts of the body were eaten, in "the hope that the child will be born again, or that strength will accrue to another child".

==== South Australia and Victoria ====
According to William D. Rubinstein, "Nineteenth-century European observers of Aboriginal life in South Australia and Victoria reported that about 30% of Aboriginal infants were killed at birth."

In 1881 James Dawson wrote a passage about infanticide among Indigenous people in the western district of Victoria, which stated that "Twins are as common among them as among Europeans; but as food is occasionally very scarce, and a large family troublesome to move about, it is lawful and customary to destroy the weakest twin child, irrespective of sex. It is usual also to destroy those which are malformed."

He also wrote "When a woman has children too rapidly for the convenience and necessities of the parents, she makes up her mind to let one be killed, and consults with her husband which it is to be. As the strength of a tribe depends more on males than females, the girls are generally sacrificed. The child is put to death and buried, or burned without ceremony; not, however, by its father or mother, but by relatives. No one wears mourning for it. Sickly children are never killed on account of their bad health, and are allowed to die naturally."

==== Western Australia ====
In 1937, a Christian reverend in the Kimberley offered a "baby bonus" to Aboriginal families as a deterrent against infanticide and to increase the birthrate of the local Indigenous population.

==== Australian Capital Territory ====
A Canberran journalist in 1927 wrote of the "cheapness of life" to the Aboriginal people local to the Canberra area 100 years before. "If drought or bush fires had devastated the country and curtailed food supplies, babies got a short shift. Ailing babies, too would not be kept", he wrote.

==== New South Wales ====
A bishop wrote in 1928 that it was common for Aboriginal Australians to restrict the size of their tribal groups, including by infanticide, so that the food resources of the tribal area may be sufficient for them.

==== Northern Territory ====
Annette Hamilton, a professor of anthropology at Macquarie University, who carried out research in the Aboriginal community of Maningrida in Arnhem Land during the 1960s, wrote that prior to that time part-European babies born to Aboriginal mothers had not been allowed to live, and that "mixed-unions are frowned on by men and women alike as a matter of principle".

=== Oceania ===
==== Marshall Islands ====
When Russian explorer Otto von Kotzebue visited the Marshall Islands in Micronesia in 1817, he noted that Marshallese families practiced infanticide after the birth of a third child as a form of population planning due to frequent famines.

==== Tikopia ====
According to early 19th-century accounts by maritime captain Peter Dillon, families on the island of Tikopia traditionally practiced infanticide by strangling newborn males beyond the first two children to prevent overpopulation and subsequent food shortages.

=== North America ===
==== Inuit ====
There is no agreement about the actual estimates of the frequency of newborn female infanticide in the Inuit population. Carmel Schrire mentions diverse studies ranging from 15% to 80%. Polar Inuit (Inughuit) killed unwanted children by throwing them into the sea.

The Yukon and the Mahlemuit tribes of Alaska exposed the female newborns by first stuffing their mouths with grass before leaving them to die. In Arctic Canada the Inuit exposed their babies on the ice and left them to die.

Female Inuit infanticide disappeared in the 1930s and 1940s after contact with the Western cultures from the South.

However, it must be acknowledged these infanticide claims came from non-Inuit observers, whose writings were later used to justify the forced westernization of indigenous peoples. In 2009, Travis Hedwig argued that infanticide runs counter to cultural norms at the time and that researchers were misinterpreting the actions of an unfamiliar culture and people.

==== Canada ====
The Handbook of North American Indians reports infanticide among the Dene Natives and those of the Mackenzie Mountains.

==== Native Americans ====
In the Eastern Shoshone there was a scarcity of Native American women as a result of female infanticide. For the Maidu Native Americans twins were so dangerous that they not only killed them, but the mother as well. In the region known today as southern Texas, the Mariame Native Americans practiced infanticide of females on a large scale. Wives had to be obtained from neighboring groups.

==== Mexico ====
Bernal Díaz recounted that, after landing on the Veracruz coast, they came across a temple dedicated to Tezcatlipoca. "That day they had sacrificed two boys, cutting open their chests and offering their blood and hearts to that accursed idol". In The Conquest of New Spain Díaz describes more child sacrifices in the towns before the Spaniards reached the large Aztec city Tenochtitlan.

=== South America ===
Although academic data of infanticides among the indigenous people in South America is not as abundant as that of North America, the estimates seem to be similar.

==== Brazil ====
The Tapirapé indigenous people of Brazil allowed no more than three children per woman, and no more than two of the same sex. If the rule was broken infanticide was practiced. The Bororo killed all the newborns that did not appear healthy enough. Infanticide is also documented in the case of the Korubo people in the Amazon.

The Yanomami men killed children while raiding enemy villages. Helena Valero, a Brazilian woman kidnapped by Yanomami warriors in the 1930s, witnessed a Karawetari raid on her tribe:

They killed so many. I was weeping for fear and for pity but there was nothing I could do. They snatched the children from their mothers to kill them, while the others held the mothers tightly by the arms and wrists as they stood up in a line. All the women wept. ... The men began to kill the children; little ones, bigger ones, they killed many of them.

==== Peru, Paraguay and Bolivia ====
While qhapaq hucha was practiced in the Peruvian large cities, child sacrifice in the pre-Columbian tribes of the region is less documented. However, even today studies on the Aymara Indians reveal high incidences of mortality among the newborn, especially female deaths, suggesting infanticide. The Abipones, a small tribe of Guaycuruan stock, of about 5,000 by the end of the 18th century in Paraguay, practiced systematic infanticide; with never more than two children being reared in one family. The Machigenga killed their disabled children. Infanticide among the Chaco in Paraguay was estimated as high as 50% of all newborns in that tribe, who were usually buried. The infanticidal custom had such roots among the Ayoreo in Bolivia and Paraguay that it persisted until the late 20th century.

== Modern times ==
Infanticide has become less common in the Western world. The frequency has been estimated to be 1 in approximately 3000 to 5000 children of all ages and 2.1 per 100,000 newborns per year. It is thought that infanticide today continues at a much higher rate in areas of extremely high poverty and overpopulation, such as parts of India. Female infants, then and even now, are particularly vulnerable, a factor in sex-selective infanticide. Recent estimates suggest that over 100 million girls and women are 'missing' in Asia.

=== Benin ===
In spite of the fact that it is illegal, in Benin, West Africa, parents secretly continue with infanticidal customs.

=== Mainland China ===
There have been some accusations that infanticide occurs in mainland China due to the one-child policy. In the 1990s, a certain stretch of the Yangtze River was known to be a common site of infanticide by drowning, until government projects made access to it more difficult. A study from 2012 suggests that over 40 million girls and women are missing in mainland China.

=== India ===
The practice has continued in some rural areas of India. India has the highest infanticide rate in the world, despite infanticide being illegal.

According to a 2005 report by the United Nations Children's Fund (UNICEF) up to 50 million girls and women are missing in India's population as a result of systematic sex discrimination and sex selective abortions.

=== Pakistan ===
Killings of newborn babies have been on the rise in Pakistan, corresponding to an increase in poverty across the country. More than 1,000 infants, mostly girls, were killed or abandoned to die in Pakistan in 2009 according to a Pakistani charity organization.

The Edhi Foundation found 1,210 dead babies in 2010. Many more are abandoned and left at the doorsteps of mosques. As a result, Edhi centers feature signs "Do not murder, lay them here." Though female infanticide is punishable by life in prison, such crimes are rarely prosecuted.

=== Oceania ===
On 28 November 2008, The National, one of Papua New Guinea's two largest newspapers at the time, ran a story entitled "Male Babies Killed To Stop Fights", which claimed that in Agibu and Amosa villages of the Gimi region of the Eastern Highlands province – where tribal fighting had been going on since 1986 – women had agreed to stop producing males, allowing only female babies to survive, so that there would be no men in the future to fight. However, Salvation Army workers in the region denied that the supposed male infanticide had actually happened. Instead, women had merely hypothetically mentioned this possibility at a peace and reconciliation workshop in order to make a point, without planning to actually kill their sons.

=== England and Wales ===
In England and Wales there were typically 30 to 50 homicides per million children less than 1 year old between 1982 and 1996. The younger the infant, the higher the risk. The rate for children 1 to 5 years was around 10 per million children. The homicide rate of infants less than 1 year is significantly higher than for the general population.

In English law infanticide is established as a distinct offence by the Infanticide Acts. Defined as the killing of a child under 12 months of age by their mother, the effect of the Acts are to establish a partial defence to charges of murder.

=== United States ===
In the United States, the infanticide rate during the first hour of life outside the womb dropped from 1.41 per 100,000 between the years 1963 and 1972, to 0.44 per 100,000 between 1974 and 1983. The rates during the first month after birth also declined, whereas those for older infants rose during this time. The legalization of abortion, which was completed in 1973, was the most important factor in the decline in neonatal mortality during the period from 1964 to 1977, according to a study by economists associated with the National Bureau of Economic Research.

=== Canada ===
In Canada, 114 cases of infanticide by a parent were reported during 1964–1968.

=== Spain ===
In Spain, far-right political party Vox has claimed that female perpetrators of infanticide outnumber male perpetrators of femicide. However, neither the Spanish National Statistics Institute nor the Ministry of the Interior keep data on the gender of perpetrators, but victims of femicide consistently number higher than victims of infanticide. From 2013 to March 2018, 28 infanticide cases perpetrated by 22 mothers and three stepmothers were reported in Spain.

== Explanations for the practice ==
There are various reasons for infanticide. Neonaticide typically has different patterns and causes than for the killing of older infants. Traditional neonaticide is often related to economic necessity – the inability to provide for the infant. In the United Kingdom and the United States, older infants are typically killed for reasons related to child abuse, domestic violence or mental illness. For infants older than one day, younger infants are more at risk, and boys are more at risk than girls. Risk factors for the parent include: Family history of violence, violence in a current relationship, history of abuse or neglect of children, and personality disorder and/or depression.

=== Economic ===
Many historians believe the reason to be primarily economic, with more children born than the family is prepared to support. Marvin Harris estimated that among Paleolithic hunters 23–50% of newborn children were killed. He argued that the goal was to preserve the 0.001% population growth of that time. He also wrote that female infanticide may be a form of population control. Population control is achieved not only by limiting the number of potential mothers; increased fighting among men for access to relatively scarce wives would also lead to a decline in population. For example, on the Melanesian island of Tikopia infanticide was used to keep a stable population in line with its resource base. In 1888, Lieut. F. Elton reported that Ugi beach people in the Solomon Islands killed their infants at birth by burying them, and women were also said to practice abortion. They reported that it was too much trouble to raise a child, and instead preferred to buy one from the bush people. Research by Marvin Harris and William Divale supports this argument, it has been cited as an example of environmental determinism. However, it is argued that it has also occurred equally among rich and poor and during decadent periods of the Roman Empire as during earlier, less affluent, periods.

In societies that are patrilineal and patrilocal, the family may choose to allow more sons to live and practice female infanticide, as sons will support their birth family until they die, whereas daughters will leave economically and geographically to join their husband's family, possibly only after the payment of a burdensome dowry price. Under natural conditions, mortality rates for girls under five are slightly lower than boys for biological reasons. However, after birth, neglect and diverting resources to male children, such as biased feeding practices, inadequate clothing during winter and lower-quality health care, can lead to some countries having a skewed ratio with more boys than girls, with such practices killing an approximate 230,000 girls under five in India each year. While sex-selective abortion is more common among the higher income population, who can access medical technology, abuse after birth, such as infanticide and abandonment, is more common among the lower income population. Before the appearance of effective contraception, infanticide was a common occurrence in ancient brothels and prostitutes in certain areas preferred to kill their male offspring.

Cross-cultural research has found that infanticide is more likely to occur when the child has deformities or illnesses and anthropologists have argued that they are often viewed as bad omens as raising such a child in poverty-stricken communities are an insurmountable hurdle. For example, in southern Ethiopia, children with physical abnormalities are considered to be ritually impure or mingi, with the ability to exert an evil influence upon others, so disabled infants have traditionally been disposed of.

=== Social stigma ===
Infants have been killed for superstitious accusations, such as being witches, often by being buried alive or left to starve. Those at higher risk of being accused and killed include the disabled, albinos, those born prematurely, twins, children of single mothers and intersex infants. Intersex infants commonly suffer from infanticide particularly in developing countries, largely caused by stigma surrounding intersex conditions. Often intersex infants are abandoned, while others are actively killed.

Illegitimacy and its shame has led mothers or their families to kill infants. This was also the impetus for a mother's decision to give her child to a baby farmer. Baby farming is the practice of accepting custody of a child in return for payment. This was most common in Victorian Britain. Baby farmers sometimes neglected or murdered the babies to keep costs down.

=== Psychiatric ===
Postpartum psychosis is also a causative factor of infanticide. Stuart S. Asch, MD, a professor of psychiatry at Cornell University Medical School established the connections between some cases of infanticide and postpartum depression.^{,}^{,} The books From Cradle to Grave and The Death of Innocents describe selected cases of maternal infanticide in New York City. Stanley Hopwood wrote that childbirth and lactation entail severe stress on women, and that under certain circumstances attempts at infanticide and suicide are common. The Infanticide Acts are several now repealed laws that, in 1922, made the killing of an infant child by its mother during the early months of life a lesser crime than murder, introducing the idea that postpartum depression was legally to be regarded as a form of diminished responsibility. A study published in the American Journal of Psychiatry revealed that 44% of filicidal fathers had a diagnosis of psychosis. In addition to postpartum psychosis, dissociative psychopathology, and sociopathy have also been found to be associated with neonaticide in some cases.

In the late 17th and early 18th centuries, "loopholes" were invented by some suicidal members of Lutheran churches who wanted to avoid the damnation that was promised by most Christian doctrine as a penalty of suicide. One famous example of someone who wished to end their life but avoid the eternity in hell was Christina Johansdotter (died 1740). She was a Swedish murderer who killed a child in Stockholm with the sole purpose of being executed. She is an example of those who seek suicide through execution by committing a murder. It was a common act, frequently targeting young children or infants as they were believed to be free from sin, meaning they would go "straight to heaven". Although mainstream Christian denominations, including Lutherans, view the murder of an innocent as being condemned in the Fifth Commandment, the suicidal members of Lutheran churches who deliberately killed children with the intent of getting executed were usually well aware of Christian doctrine against murder, and planned to repent and seek forgiveness of their sins afterwards. For example, in 18th century Denmark up until the year 1767, murderers were given the opportunity to repent of their sins before they were executed either way. In 1767, religiously motivated suicidal murders ceased in Denmark with the abolishment of the death penalty.

Evolutionary psychology has proposed several theories for different forms of infanticide. Infanticide by stepfathers, as well as child abuse in general by stepfathers, has been explained by spending resources on not genetically related children reducing reproductive success (See the Cinderella effect and Infanticide (zoology)). Infanticide is one of the few forms of violence more often done by women than men and this has been explained as since women generally have a greater parental investment than men, spending resources on an unfit child would decrease the mother's inclusive fitness.

== Ethics ==
Most people today hold that infants have the same moral status as older humans, making infanticide essentially always wrong in the same way that killing older persons typically is.

Some have challenged this view. Philosopher Peter Singer, known for a philosophy called personism, argues that newborns lack the essential characteristics of personhood—"rationality, autonomy, and self-consciousness"—and therefore "killing a newborn baby is never equivalent to killing a person, that is, a being who wants to go on living". Some medical ethicists have argued for parents to be allowed to kill their newborn babies because they are not "actual persons"; they have proposed to call this after-birth abortion. Some authors warn that it is hard to defend consistently and credibly a position that rejects infanticide yet accepts the abortion of viable fetuses and the killing of higher animals, such as chimpanzees.

Ethicists who consider abortion permissible but reject infanticide often argue from differences in the moral status of fetuses and newborns. One such argument is that birth imposes parental responsibilities on the parents that do not exist before birth. Another argument is that killing someone violates their bodily rights and that persons have such rights from the moment of birth, but not before.

== Current law ==
=== Australia ===
In New South Wales, infanticide is defined in Section 22A(1) of the Crimes Act 1900 (NSW) as follows:

Where a woman by any willful act or omission causes the death of her child, being a child under the age of twelve months, but at the time of the act or omission the balance of her mind was disturbed by reason of her not having fully recovered from the effect of giving birth to the child or by reason of the effect of lactation consequent upon the birth of the child, then, notwithstanding that the circumstances were such that but for this section the offense would have amounted to murder, she shall be guilty of infanticide, and may for such offense be dealt with and punished as if she had been guilty of the offense of manslaughter of such child.

Because Infanticide is punishable as manslaughter, as per s24, the maximum penalty for this offence is therefore 25 years imprisonment.

In Victoria, infanticide is defined by Section 6 of the Crimes Act of 1958 with a maximum penalty of five years.

=== New Zealand ===
In New Zealand, infanticide is provided for by Section 178 of the Crimes Act 1961 which states:

Where a woman causes the death of any child of hers under the age of 10 years in a manner that amounts to culpable homicide, and where at the time of the offence the balance of her mind was disturbed, by reason of her not having fully recovered from the effect of giving birth to that or any other child, or by reason of the effect of lactation, or by reason of any disorder consequent upon childbirth or lactation, to such an extent that she should not be held fully responsible, she is guilty of infanticide, and not of murder or manslaughter, and is liable to imprisonment for a term not exceeding 3 years.

=== Canada ===
In Canada, infanticide is a specific offence under section 237 of the Criminal Code. It is defined as a form of culpable homicide which is neither murder nor manslaughter, and occurs when "a female person... by a wilful act or omission... causes the death of her newly-born child [defined as a child under one year of age], if at the time of the act or omission she is not fully recovered from the effects of giving birth to the child and by reason thereof or of the effect of lactation consequent on the birth of the child her mind is then disturbed." Infanticide is also a defence to murder, in that a person accused of murder who successfully presents the defence is entitled to be convicted of infanticide rather than murder. The maximum sentence for infanticide is five years' imprisonment; by contrast, the maximum sentence for manslaughter is life, and the mandatory sentence for murder is life.

The offence derives from an offence created in English law in 1922, which aimed to address the issue of judges and juries who were reluctant to return verdicts of murder against women and girls who killed their newborns out of poverty, depression, the shame of illegitimacy, or otherwise desperate circumstances, since the mandatory sentence was death (even though in those circumstances the death penalty was likely not to be carried out). With infanticide as a separate offence with a lesser penalty, convictions were more likely. The offence of infanticide was created in Canada in 1948.

There is ongoing debate in the Canadian legal and political fields about whether section 237 of the Criminal Code should be amended or abolished altogether.

=== Denmark ===
Article 238 of the Danish Penal Code covers infanticide, stating: "A mother who kills her child during or immediately after birth, and it must be assumed that she acted out of necessity, out of fear of disgrace, or under the influence of a weakness, confusion, or bewilderment brought on by the birth, is punished with imprisonment for up to 4 years."

=== England and Wales ===
In England and Wales, the Infanticide Act 1938 describes the offence of infanticide as one which would otherwise amount to murder (by their mother) if the victim was older than 12 months and the mother did not have an "imbalance of mind" due to the effects of childbirth or lactation. Where a mother who has killed such an infant has been charged with murder rather than infanticide s.1(3) of the Act confirms that a jury has the power to find alternative verdicts of Manslaughter in English law or guilty but insane.

=== The Netherlands ===
Infanticide is illegal in the Netherlands, although the maximum sentence is lower than for homicide. The Groningen Protocol regulates euthanasia for infants who are believed to "suffer hopelessly and unbearably" under strict conditions.

=== Poland ===
Article 149 of the Penal Code of Poland stipulates that a mother who kills her child in labour, while under the influence of the course of the delivery, is liable to imprisonment for between three months and five years.

=== Romania ===
Article 200 of the Penal Code of Romania stipulates that the killing of a newborn during the first 24 hours, by the mother who is in a state of mental distress, shall be punished with imprisonment of one to five years. The previous Romanian Penal Code also defined infanticide (pruncucidere) as a distinct criminal offense, providing for punishment of two to seven years imprisonment, recognizing the fact that a mother's judgment may be impaired immediately after birth.

=== United States ===
While legislation regarding infanticide in some countries focuses on rehabilitation, believing that treatment and education will prevent repetitive action, the United States remains focused on delivering punishment. One justification for punishment is the difficulty of implementing rehabilitation services. With an overcrowded prison system, the United States can not provide the necessary treatment and services.

==== State legislation ====
In 2009, Texas state representative Jessica Farrar proposed legislation that would define infanticide as a distinct and lesser crime than homicide. Under the terms of the proposed legislation, if jurors concluded that a mother's "judgment was impaired as a result of the effects of giving birth or the effects of lactation following the birth," they would be allowed to convict her of the crime of infanticide, rather than murder. The maximum penalty for infanticide would be two years in prison. Farrar's introduction of this bill prompted liberal bioethics scholar Jacob M. Appel to call her "the bravest politician in America".

==== Federal legislation ====
The MOTHERS Act (Moms Opportunity To access Health, Education, Research and Support), precipitated by the death of a Chicago woman with postpartum psychosis was introduced in 2009. The act was ultimately incorporated into the Patient Protection and Affordable Care Act which passed in 2010. The act requires screening for postpartum mood disorders at any time of the adult lifespan as well as expands research on postpartum depression. Provisions of the act also authorize grants to support clinical services for women who have, or are at risk for, postpartum psychosis.

== Wider effects ==
=== Surviving children ===
In addition to debates over the morality of infanticide itself, there is some debate over the effects of infanticide on surviving children, and the effects of childrearing in societies that also sanction infanticide. Some argue that the practice of infanticide in any widespread form causes enormous psychological damage in children. Conversely, studying societies that practice infanticide Géza Róheim reported that even infanticidal mothers in New Guinea, who ate a child, did not affect the personality development of the surviving children; that "these are good mothers who eat their own children". Harris and Divale's work on the relationship between female infanticide and warfare suggests that there are, however, extensive negative effects.

=== Societal ===
For female infanticide, mothers who keep giving birth to daughters could face divorce or violence. Skewed sex ratio with lack of available women to marry leads to violence such as bride kidnapping.

== Prevention ==
=== Sex education and birth control ===
Since infanticide, especially neonaticide, is often a response to an unwanted birth, preventing unwanted pregnancies through improved sex education and increased contraceptive access are advocated as ways of preventing infanticide. Increased use of contraceptives and access to safe legal abortions have greatly reduced neonaticide in many developed nations. In Pakistan, advocates of legalizing abortion say it would reduce infanticide and save mothers from potentially fatal back-street terminations.

=== Psychiatric intervention ===
Cases of infanticide have also garnered increasing attention and interest from advocates for the mentally ill as well as organizations dedicated to postpartum disorders. Following the trial of Andrea Yates, a mother from the United States who garnered national attention for drowning her 5 children, representatives from organizations such as the Postpartum Support International and the Marcé Society for Treatment and Prevention of Postpartum Disorders began requesting clarification of diagnostic criteria for postpartum disorders and improved guidelines for treatments. While accounts of postpartum psychosis have dated back over 2,000 years ago, perinatal mental illness is still largely under-diagnosed despite postpartum psychosis affecting 1 to 2 per 1000 women. Screening for psychiatric disorders or risk factors, and providing treatment or assistance to those at risk may help prevent infanticide.

While studies on the treatment of postpartum psychosis are scarce, a number of case and cohort studies have found evidence describing the effectiveness of lithium monotherapy for both acute and maintenance treatment of postpartum psychosis, with the majority of patients achieving complete remission. Adjunctive treatments include electroconvulsive therapy, antipsychotic medication, or benzodiazepines. Electroconvulsive therapy, in particular, is the primary treatment for patients with catatonia, severe agitation, and difficulties eating or drinking. Antidepressants should be avoided throughout the acute treatment of postpartum psychosis due to risk of worsening mood instability.

Though screening and treatment may help prevent infanticide, in the developed world, significant proportions of neonaticides that are detected occur in young women who deny their pregnancy and avoid outside contacts, many of whom may have limited contact with these health care services.

=== Safe surrender ===
In some areas baby hatches or safe surrender sites, safe places for a mother to anonymously leave an infant, are offered, in part to reduce the rate of infanticide. In other places, like the United States, safe-haven laws allow mothers to anonymously give infants to designated officials; they are frequently located at hospitals and police and fire stations. Additionally, some countries in Europe have the laws of anonymous birth and confidential birth that allow mothers to give up an infant after birth. In anonymous birth, the mother does not attach her name to the birth certificate. In confidential birth, the mother registers her name and information, but the document containing her name is sealed until the child comes to age. Typically such babies are put up for adoption, or cared for in orphanages.

=== Employment ===
Granting women employment raises their status and autonomy. Having a gainful employment can raise the perceived worth of women. This can lead to an increase in the number of women getting an education and a decrease in the number of female infanticide. As a result, the infant mortality rate will decrease and economic development will increase.

== In animals ==
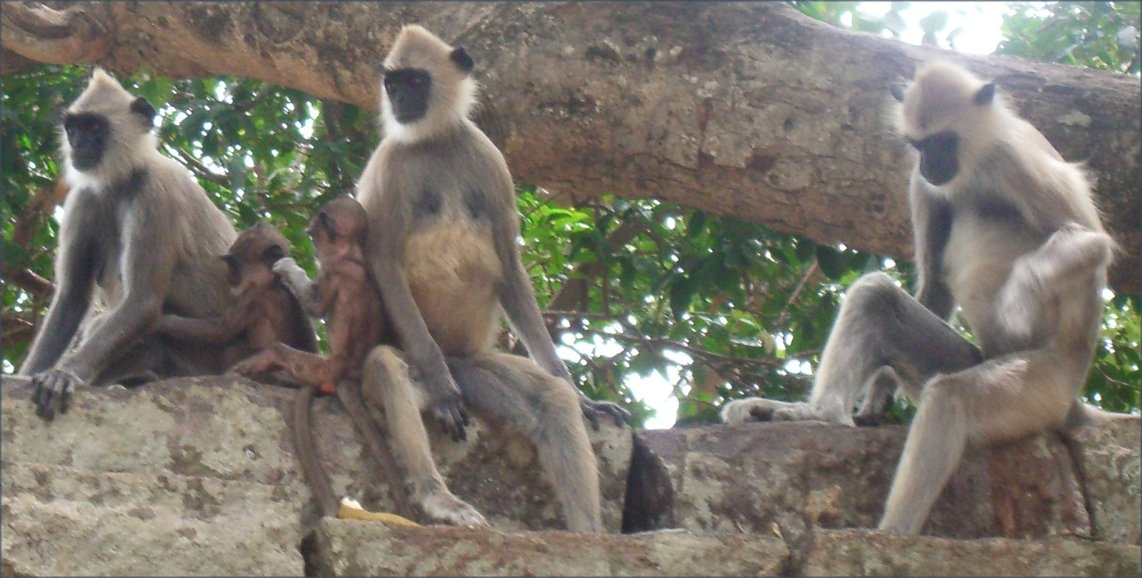
The Hanuman langurs are among the species where infanticide occurs.

The practice has been observed in many other species of the animal kingdom since it was first seriously studied by Yukimaru Sugiyama. These include from microscopic rotifers and insects, to fish, amphibians, birds and mammals, including primates such as chacma baboons.

According to studies carried out by Kyoto University in primates, including certain types of gorillas and chimpanzees, several conditions favor the tendency to kill their offspring in some species (to be performed only by males), among them are: Nocturnal life, the absence of nest construction, the marked sexual dimorphism in which the male is much larger than the female, the mating in a specific season and the high period of lactation without resumption of the estrus state in the female.

== In art and literature ==
An instance in which a child born on an inauspicious day is to live or die according to the chance of being trampled by cattle (death being likely) is provided by Infanticide in Madagascar, painted by Henry Melville and engraved by J Redaway for Fisher's Drawing Room Scrap Book, 1838 with a poetical illustration and notes by Letitia Elizabeth Landon.

== See also ==
- Abortion – Termination of a pregnancy
- Child cannibalism – Practice of eating a child or fetus
- Child euthanasia – Euthanasia applied to gravely ill children
- The Cruel Mother – Traditional song
- Female perversion – Violence against children by women
- Filicide – Deliberate act of a parent killing their own child
- Margaret Garner – United States fugitive slave (died 1858)
- Jenůfa (opera by Leoš Janáček)
- List of countries by infant mortality rate
- La Llorona (Mexican legend)
- Medea (Euripides' play)
- Miyuki Ishikawa – Japanese infanticide serial killer (1897–1987)
- A Modest Proposal, by Jonathan Swift
- Overlaying – child-smothering during carer's sleep
- Sudden infant death syndrome – Sudden unexplained death of a child who is less than one year of age
