= Mauricio García Vega =

Mexican painter (born 1944)

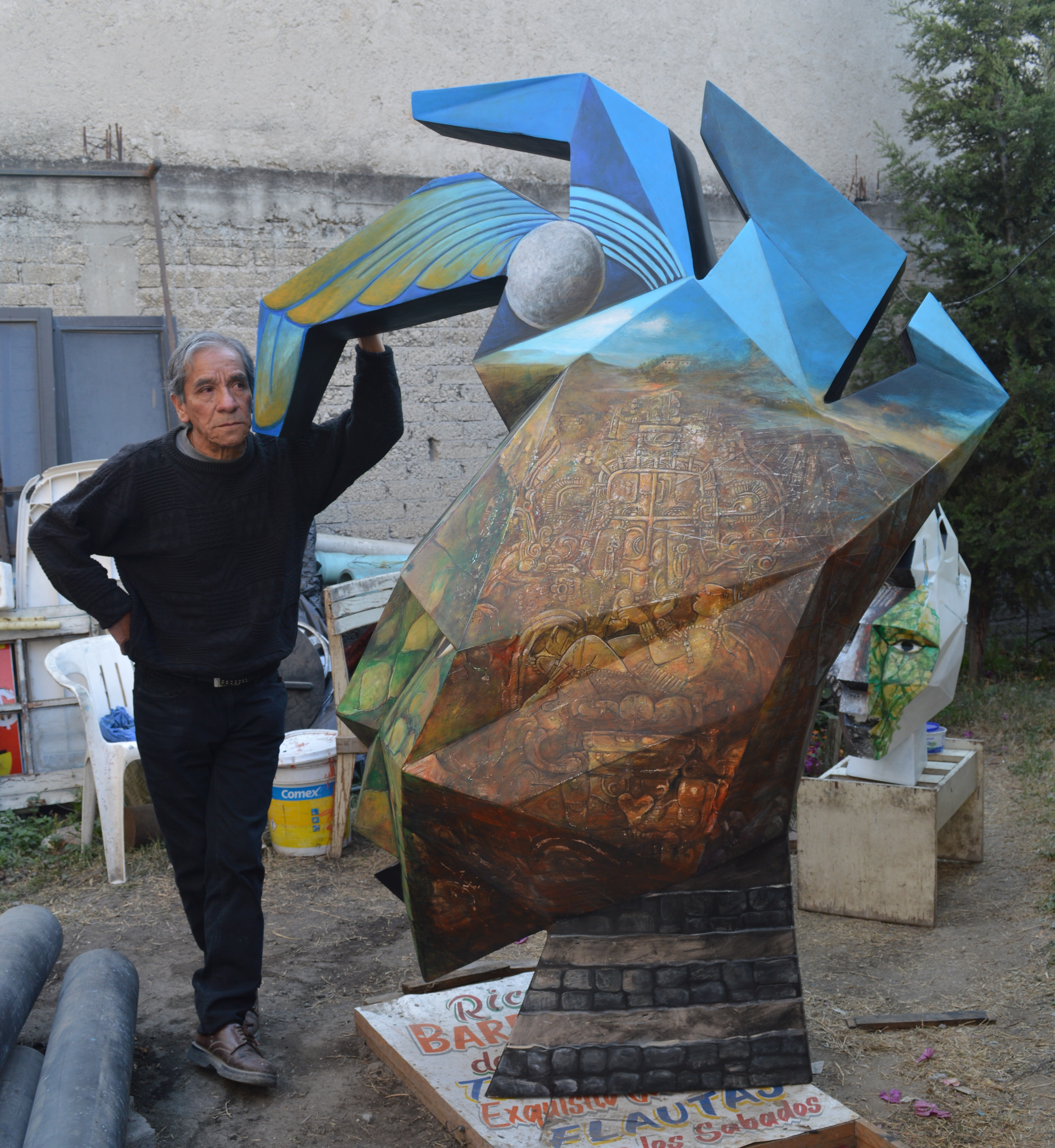
- Artist with one of his works at his workshop in Ciudad Nezahualcoyotl
- Born: December 21, 1944 (age 80); Mexico City
- Education: Instituto AFHA de Artes Plásticas
- Known for: painting
- Website: mauricio-vega.blogspot.mx

Mauricio García Vega (born December 21, 1944) is a Mexican painter whose work has been recognized by various awards and membership in the Salón de la Plástica Mexicana. His work is mostly focused on urban landscapes, often with dark themes and a chaotic feel. He works both alone and with his brother Antonio García Vega. He lives and works in the Mexico City suburb of Ciudad Nezahualcóyotl.

== Life ==
Mauricio García Vega was born on December 21, 1944, in Mexico City. He is the older brother of artist Antonio García Vega and has the nickname of “Untonten.” From 1965 to 1967, he studied at the Instituto AFHA de Artes Plásticas in Barcelona. From 1968 to 1972, he studied at the Escuela Libre de Arte y Publicidad in Mexico City, studying illustration with Alberto Beltrán and learned lithography with Leo Acosta in 1975. In 2006, he learned engraving at the Promedart Workshop. In 2002, he was accepted as a member of the Salón de la Plástica Mexicana and served on that organization’s board from 2005 to 2006. He lives in Ciudad Nezahualcóyotl.

== Career ==
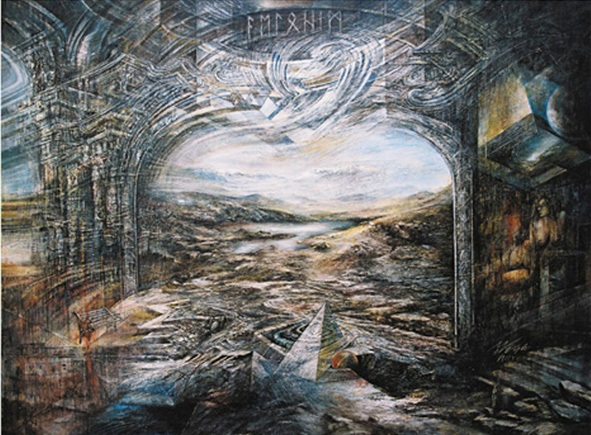
Hacia el arcano ("Towards the arcane")

García Vega has had over 180 individual and collective exhibitions in Mexico, the United States, Cuba, Argentina, Spain, and France. In Mexico, his work has been displayed at the Museo de Arte Contemporáneo de Monterrey, the Art Museum of Mazatlán, the Museo Regional de Antropología in Puebla, the Casa de la Cultura de Oaxaca, the Museo de los Pintores Oaxaqueños, the site museum of the archaeological site of Teotihuacan, the Museo Felipe Santiago Gutiérrez in Toluca, the Universidad Tecnológica de Nezahualcóyotl, the Tecnológico de Estudios Superiores in Chimalhuacán, the Galería Siglo XXI at the Centro Médico del Seguro Social, the Museo Casa de León Trotsky, and others. It has also been included in various biennial competitions such as the Tercera Bienal de Puntura, Museo de Arte Contemporaneo Rufino Tamao in Mexico City in 1986 and the Sexta Bienal Nacional de Pintura y Grabado, Museo de Arte Contemporaneo in Morelia in 2007.

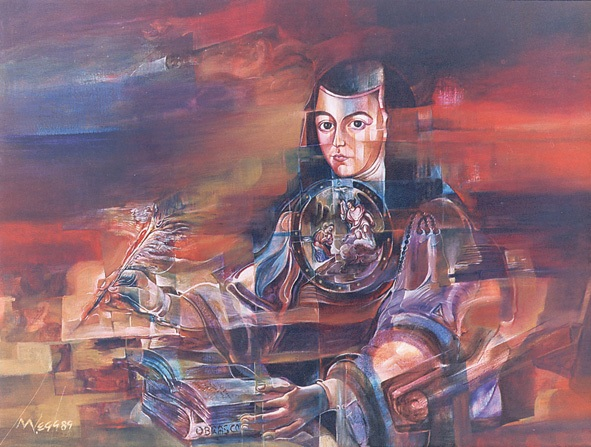
Juana Ines de la Cruz in art by Mexican artist Mauricio García Vega.

He has also worked with his brother Antonio García Vega on projects. One of these was the Aus Der Tiefe (German: From the depths) exhibition which consisted of about fifty pieces such as paintings, reliefs, and drawings, which were displayed in various venues, such as the Salón de la Plástica Mexicana, the Tecnológico de Estudios Superiores de Chimalhuacán, and the Galería Abad Plácido Retmeier, from 2010 to 2012.

His awards and recognitions include an honorary mention at the first painting competition of the Sahuagún Industrial complex (1980), an honorary mention at the Marcas, Símbolos y Logos event at the Palacio de Bellas Artes (1985), an honorary mention at the first Los Retratos de Sor Juana painting competition in Toluca (1989), first place at the Salón annual de Pintura of the Salón de la Plástica Mexicana (2002), second place at the Salón Annual de Dibujo y Grabado at the same institution (2003), honorary mention at the Sexta Bienal Nacional de Pintura y Grabado at the Museo de Arte Contemporaneo in Morelia (2007), second place at the Salon Annual de Dibujo y Grabado at the Salon de la Plástica Mexicana (2011), and first place at the Salon Annual de Pintura at the same institution (2011).

== Artistry ==
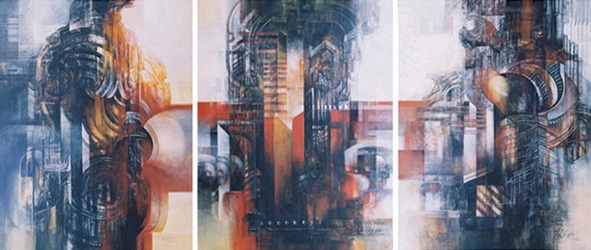
Metropolis I

His works, like that of his brother Antonio, tend to deal with urban themes, often about human decadence. Images are not realistic and are generally distorted. His works often contain urban landscapes with a chaotic feel. The Aus der Tiefe series deals with the violence in human society, which the artist has said continues to grow. Vega considers his works to be cathartic, especially for him as he paints.) He states that his main influences are Francisco Goya, Francis Bacon, and Giovanni Battista Piranesi as well as German Expressionism, and Goya’s Black Paintings. He mostly uses acrylics because they dry faster than oils. According to art critic Carlos Blas Galindo, García Vega’s works are meant to disquiet, move, impact, impress, surprise, and amaze onlookers. His images can evoke a sense of terror, the sublime, the sinister, the grotesque, the brutal, and the dramatic. His works are often done in diptychs and triptychs.
