= Christina Johansdotter =

Swedish murderer

Christina Johansdotter (died 1740) was a Swedish murderer who killed a child in Stockholm with the sole purpose of being executed. She is an example of those who seek suicide through a death sentence for committing a murder.

== The murder ==
The case of Christina Johansdotter was brought before the court Södra Förstads kämnärsrätt in Stockholm in 1740. She was accused of having murdered the infant of a friend by decapitating it with an axe. Christina was an unemployed lodger at the time, clearly depressed, having isolated herself socially for a time.

Christina freely admitted her crime and openly declared that she was guilty of what she was accused. She clearly explained her motive to the court. She had been deeply in love with her fiancé, and when he died, she had lost all will to live and wanted to follow him to the grave. She had often contemplated suicide, but as the church taught that suicides go to hell, she would never see her fiancé again if she did so, as he was surely in heaven. At a loss as to how to solve this predicament, she witnessed the decapitation of a woman sentenced for infanticide, and the solution became clear to her. The murder of an adult did not always lead to a death sentence, but the murder of a child always did, and after having confessed and repented their crime, even murderers were forgiven for their sin. She therefore decided that she would do this, confess, repent and be executed, and finally see her fiancé again, and thus they would be reunited in heaven.

With this intent, she went to a friend, asked her to lend her infant (with the purpose of showing it off to an acquaintance on a visit from the country), took it outside and chopped its head off with an axe. The punishment for the murder of a child in Sweden at this time was decapitation, after which the corpse was to be publicly burned at the stake.

== Context ==
Cases such as this were common; to murder a child was a common method used by many suicidal people. The reasons for this were religious. The contemporary religious belief was that suicide would send the soul to hell; however, an executed person who confessed and repented his/her crime was believed to go straight to heaven. Children were not just ideal victims because they were easy prey due to their disadvantage in size and strength, but also because they were believed to be free of sin and, thus, did not have to receive absolution before death in order to go to heaven. In 18th century Sweden, the wish to commit suicide was the second most common reason for murdering a child, surpassed only by unmarried women suffocating their newly born infants.

These suicide-executions represent quite a peculiar historical phenomenon, which developed its own customs and culture. At the end of the 17th century, executions were given a solemn character in Stockholm; the condemned and their families bought special costumes, which were to be white or black and decorated with embroidery and ribbons, and paid for a suite to escort the condemned to the place of execution at Skanstull.

The authorities greatly disapproved of all this, as the purpose of an execution was to put fear in people, a purpose which was destroyed by these theatrical performances, which, according to the government, gave the audience sympathy for the condemned suicidals, especially if they were female.

To remedy this, the government issued a new law to abolish this execution-culture and restore the intended deterrent effect of executions. The new law was put into effect in 1754, fourteen years after the execution of Johansdotter and in the middle of this execution culture. After this, everyone suspected of committing murder with the motive of suicide by execution was to stand on the scaffold for two days with the crime stated on a board and whipped, and taken to their execution blindfolded.

This did not have much effect in reality; King Gustav III of Sweden even contemplated replacing the death sentence with life in prison for female child murderers, simply because they were given such sympathy at the executions that the punishment did not have the intended deterrent effect.
