= History of suicide =

Attitudes toward suicide have varied through time and across cultures.

== Antiquity to 1700 ==
At times, suicide played a prominent role in ancient legend and history, like with Ajax the Great, who killed himself in the Trojan War, and Lucretia, whose suicide in around 510 B.C. initiated the revolt that displaced the Roman Kingdom with the Roman Republic.

One early Greek historical person to die by suicide was Empedocles around 434 B.C. One of his beliefs was that death was a transformation. It is possible this idea influenced his suicide. Empedocles died by throwing himself into the Sicilian volcano Mount Etna.

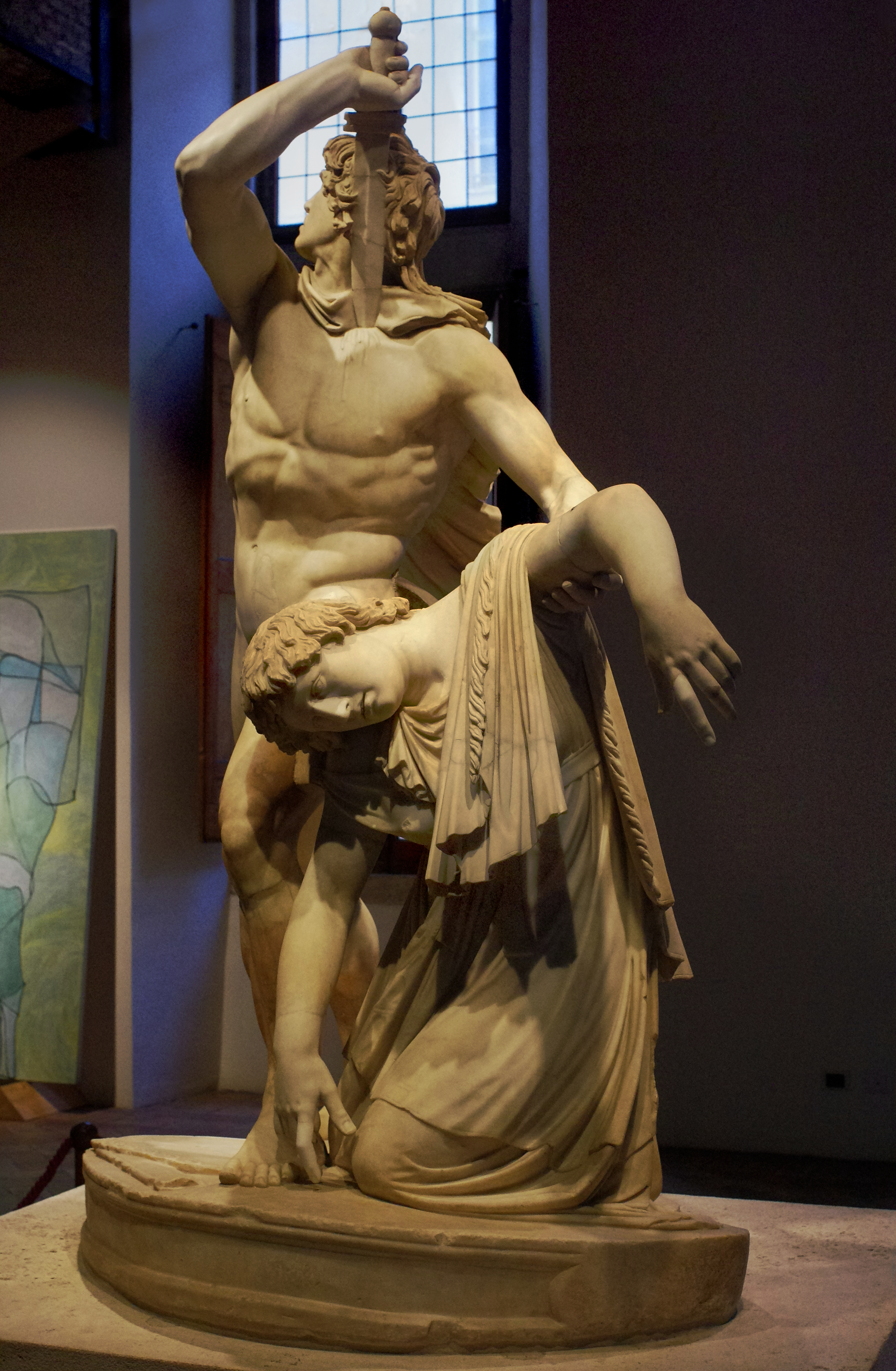
The Ludovisi Gaul killing himself and his wife, Roman copy after the Hellenistic original, Palazzo Massimo alle Terme.

In general, the pagan world, both Roman and Greek, had a relaxed attitude towards the concept of suicide.

The Council of Arles (452) stated "if a slave commits suicide no reproach shall fall upon his master." There are some precursors of Christian hostility to suicide in ancient Greek thinkers. Pythagoras, for example, was against the act, though more on mathematical than moral grounds, believing that there was only a finite number of souls for use in the world, and that the sudden and unexpected departure of one would upset a delicate balance. Aristotle also condemned suicide, though for quite different reasons – in that it robbed the community of the services of one of its members.

In Rome, suicide was never a general offense in law, though the whole approach to the question was essentially pragmatic. It was specifically forbidden in three cases: those accused of capital crimes, soldiers and slaves. The reason behind all three was the same – it was uneconomic for these people to die. If the accused killed themselves prior to trial and conviction then the state lost the right to seize their property, a loophole that was only closed by Domitian in the 1st century AD, who decreed that those who died prior to trial were without legal heirs. The suicide of a soldier was treated on the same basis as desertion. If a slave killed themselves within six months of purchase, the master could claim a full refund from the former owner.

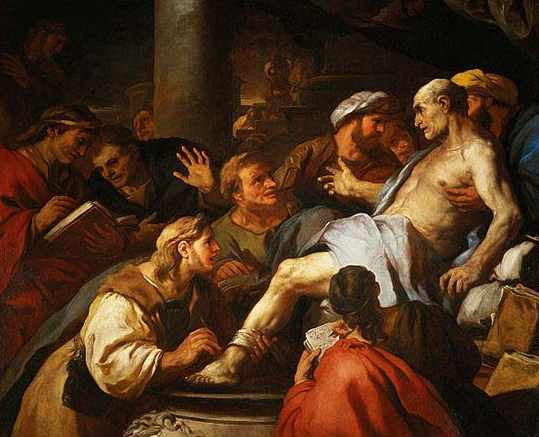
The death of Seneca (1684), painting by Luca Giordano, depicting the suicide of Seneca the Younger in Ancient Rome.

The Romans, however, fully approved of what might be termed "patriotic suicide" – in other words, death as an alternative to dishonor. For the Stoics, a philosophical sect which originated in Greece, death was a guarantee of personal freedom, an escape from an unbearable reality that had nothing left to give. And so it was for Cato the Younger, who killed himself after the Pompeian cause was defeated at the Battle of Thapsus. This was a "virtuous death", one guided by reason and conscience. His example was later followed by Seneca, though under somewhat more straitened circumstances, as he had been ordered to do so on suspicion of being involved with the Pisonian conspiracy to kill Emperor Nero. A very definite line was drawn by the Romans between the virtuous suicide and suicide for entirely private reasons. They disapproved of Mark Antony not because he killed himself, but that he killed himself for love.

In the medieval Baltics, particularly in pagan Lithuania before its 1387 conversion, suicide was often viewed as a ritualistic or "altruistic" act of honor. Historical chronicles depict a society where self-sacrifice was a culturally accepted response to defeat, grief, or extreme illness. In pagan Lithuania, suicide was not exclusively associated with men. According to an account by Johann, a Livonian priest captured by Lithuanians, a mass suicide of women occurred in 1205 after they learned that their men, who had taken part in a raid led by Duke Žvelgaitis, had been killed. Johann reported that fifty women hanged themselves, attributing the act to a belief that they would soon be reunited with the deceased in the afterlife. Some scholars suggest that double graves found in the territories of the Balts and other Indo-European peoples may reflect similar beliefs and practices, possibly indicating instances of ritual suicide by widows. Defeated warriors frequently chose death over captivity or slavery. The most famous instance occurred in 1336 at Pilėnai Castle where defenders reportedly killed their families and then themselves to avoid surrender to the Teutonic Knights.

Continuing in the Middle Ages, many religions, including Islam and Christianity, considered suicide to be a sinful practice. Suicide was often recognized as a religious problem rather than a medical problem that could be prevented by treatment. The Christian church excommunicated people who attempted suicide, and those who died by suicide were buried outside consecrated graveyards. The Church had drawn-out discussions on the edge where the search for martyrdom was suicidal, as in the case of some of the martyrs of Córdoba.

== Changes in attitude ==
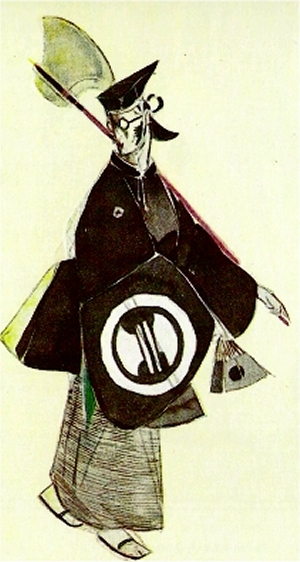
Gilbert and Sullivan's The Mikado musical satirized the illegality of suicide, with Ko-Ko deciding not to kill himself, as it would be a capital offence.

Attitudes towards suicide slowly began to shift during the Renaissance; Thomas More the English humanist, wrote in Utopia (1516) that a person afflicted with disease can "free himself from this bitter life…since by death he will put an end not to enjoyment but to torture...it will be a pious and holy action". However assisted suicide and killing oneself for other reasons were still considered a crime for people in his Utopia, punished by the denial of funerary rites. John Donne's work Biathanatos contained one of the first modern defenses of suicide, bringing proof from the conduct of Biblical figures, such as Jesus, Samson and Saul, and presenting arguments on grounds of reason and nature to sanction suicide in certain circumstances.

A criminal ordinance issued by Louis XIV of France in 1670 was far more severe in its punishment: the dead person's body was drawn through the streets, face down, and then hung or thrown on a garbage heap. Additionally, all of the person's property was confiscated.

In the late 17th and early 18th centuries, loopholes were invented to avoid the damnation that was promised by most Christian doctrine as a penalty of suicide. One famous example of someone who wished to end their life but avoid the eternity in hell was Christina Johansdotter (died 1740). She was a Swedish murderer who killed a child in Stockholm with the sole purpose of being executed. She is an example of those who seek suicide through execution by committing a murder, similar to suicide by cop.

The secularization of society that began during The Enlightenment questioned traditional religious attitudes toward suicide to eventually form the modern perspective on the issue. David Hume denied that suicide was a crime as it affected no one and was potentially to the advantage of the individual. In his 1777 Essays on Suicide and the Immortality of the Soul he rhetorically asked “Why should I prolong a miserable existence, because of some frivolous advantage which the public may perhaps receive from me?” A shift in public opinion at large can also be discerned; The Times in 1786 initiated a spirited debate on the motion “Is suicide an act of courage?”

By the 19th century, the act of suicide had shifted from being viewed as caused by sin to being caused by insanity in Europe. Although suicide remained illegal during this period, it increasingly became the target of satirical comment, such as the spoof advertisement in the 1839 Bentley's Miscellany for a London Suicide Company or the Gilbert and Sullivan musical The Mikado, that satirized the idea of executing someone who had already killed himself.

By 1879, English law began to distinguish between suicide and homicide, although suicide still resulted in forfeiture of estate. In 1882, the deceased were permitted daylight burial in England and by the mid-20th century, suicide was decriminalized in much of the western world.

== Military suicide ==
In ancient times, suicide sometimes followed defeat in battle, to avoid capture and possible subsequent torture, mutilation, or enslavement by the enemy. The Caesarean assassins Brutus and Cassius, for example, killed themselves after their defeat at the battle of Philippi. Insurgent Jews died in a mass suicide at Masada in 74 CE rather than face enslavement by the Romans.

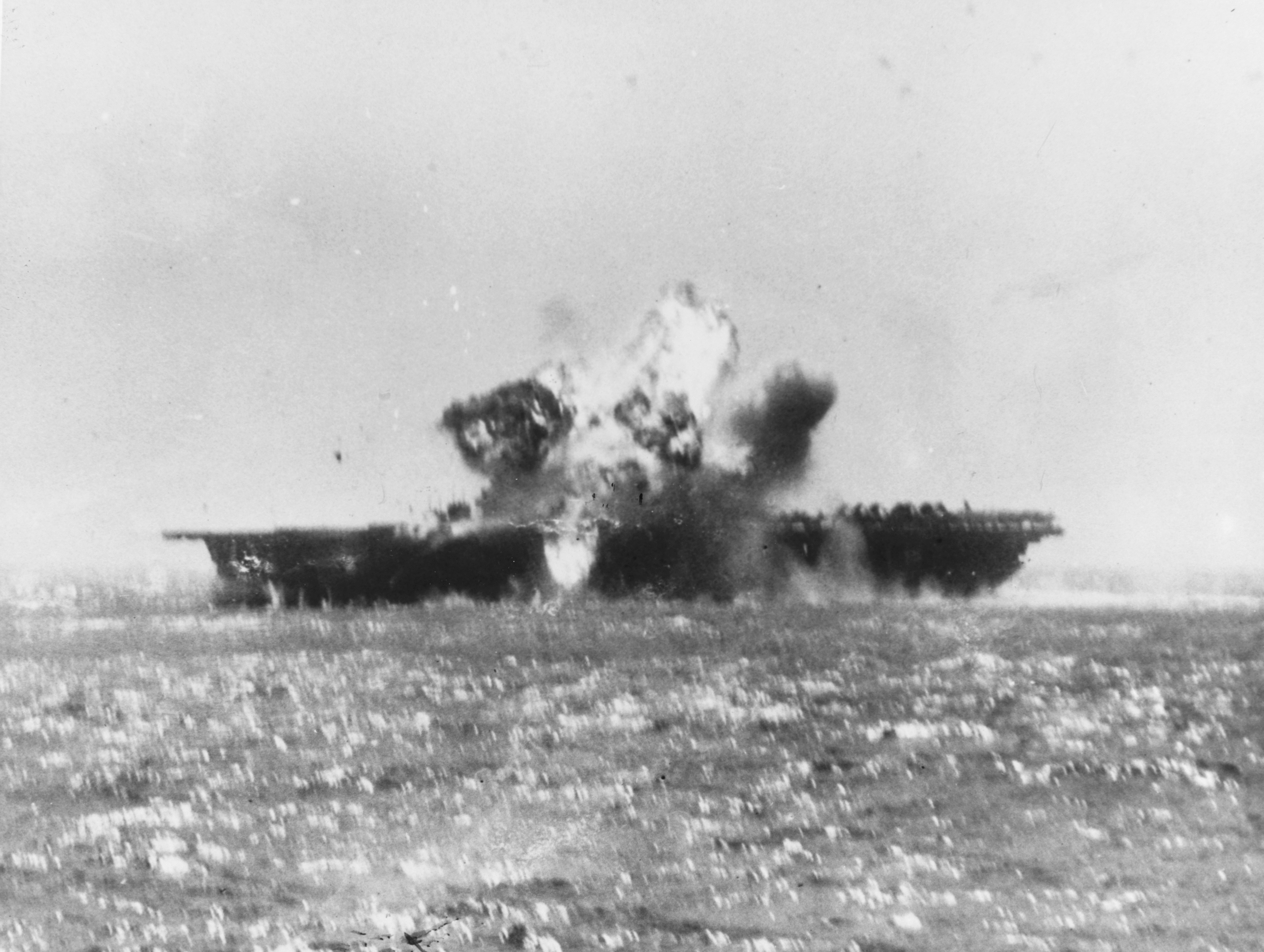
A Japanese kamikaze aircraft explodes after crashing into the USS Essex', 1944.

During World War II, Japanese units would often fight to the last man rather than surrender. Towards the end of the war, the Japanese navy sent pilots to attack Allied ships. These tactics reflect the influence of the samurai warrior culture, where seppuku was often required after a loss of honor.

In recent decades, suicide attacks have been used extensively by Islamist militants. However, suicide is strictly forbidden by Islamic law, and the terrorist leaders of the groups who organize these attacks do not regard them as suicide, but as martyrdom operations. They argue the difference to be that in suicide a person kills themselves out of despair, while in a martyrdom operation a person is killed as a pure act. This attitude is not universally held by all Muslim clerics.

Spies have carried suicide pills or other suicide devices to use when captured, partly to avoid the misery of captivity, but also to avoid being forced to disclose secrets. For the latter reason, spies may even have orders to kill themselves if captured – for example, Gary Powers had a suicide pin, but did not use it when he was captured.

== Social protest ==
Slave suicide in the United States before the American Civil War has been seen as a social protest. Some slaves were portrayed by abolitionist writers, such as William Lloyd Garrison, as those that ended their lives in response to the hypocrisy of the American Constitution. Abolitionists have had differing views on slave suicide. Many cases were published in hope of convincing the public that slaves were protesting the slave society by ending their lives.

In the 1960s, Buddhist monks, most notably Thích Quảng Đức, in South Vietnam gained Western praise in their protests against President Ngô Đình Diệm by burning themselves to death. Likewise, anti-war protestors in the United States also engaged in self-immolation to protest the US government's involvement in the Vietnam War. These caused widespread media attention, due to the extreme nature of these protests. One example of this is Alice Herz, a pacifist and holocaust survivor, who committed self-immolation in 1965, at the age of 82. She specifically cited Thích Quảng Đức's famous self-immolation protest as inspiration for this protest. Moreover, Quaker Norman Morrison also committed self-immolation as a form of protest against the Vietnam War, just eight months after Herz's protest. This was particularly shocking as he did this in the presence of his child, Emily, directly outside the window of the Pentagon office of Secretary of Defence, Robert McNamara.

Similar events were reported in central Europe, such as Jan Palach and Ryszard Siwiec following the Warsaw Pact invasion of Czechoslovakia. In 1970 Greek geology student Kostas Georgakis burned himself to death in Genoa, Italy to protest against the Greek military junta of 1967–1974.

During the Cultural Revolution in China (1966–1976), numerous publicly known figures, especially intellectuals and writers, are reported to have died by suicide, typically to escape persecution, typically at the hands of the Red Guards. Some, or perhaps many, of these reported suicides are suspected by many observers to have, in fact, not been voluntary but instead the result of mistreatment.

Eliyahu Rips, who studied mathematics in the Latvian University, on April 13, 1969 attempted self-immolation at the Freedom Monument in Riga in order to protest against the Soviet military invasion of Czechoslovakia.

== See also ==
- Philosophical views of suicide
- Religious views of suicide
- List of famous suicides
