= Antonio García Vega =

Mexican artist

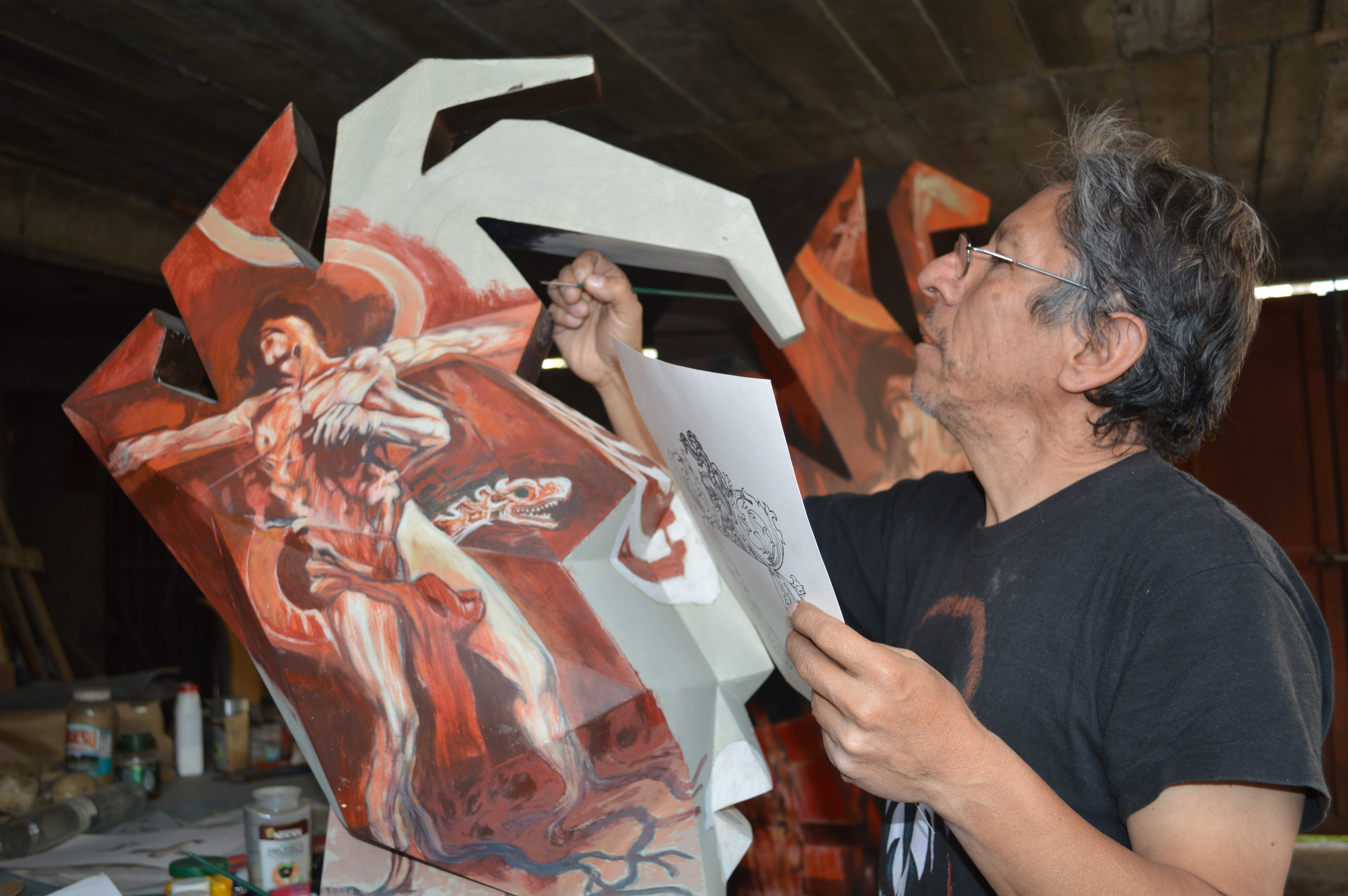
- Vega working on a piece in 2012
- Born: 1954 (age 71–72); Mexico City
- Education: Escuela Nacional de Pintura, Escultura y Grabado "La Esmeralda"
- Known for: painting
- Website: blog

Antonio García Vega (born 1954) is a Mexican artist and member of the Salón de la Plástica Mexicana. He began exhibiting his work while still in school in the early 1970s and continues to do so, often working with his brother Mauricio García Vega. He works in mixed media to paint various forms of expression. His early work was mostly fantastic, with elements of eroticism but his later work has been darker as a means of expressing his own feelings and moods. His work has mostly been exhibited in Mexico, often in conjunction with other artists including a 2010 exhibition with his brother at various venues.

== Life ==
Antonio García Vega (full name Juan Antonio García Vega) was born in Mexico City in 1954. He began drawing and painting as a child, and is the brother of painter Mauricio García Vega.

García first began studying graphic design at the Escuela de Diseño Publicitario y Pintura Artística in Mexico City. He then studied drawing and painting from 1972 to 1975 at the Escuela Nacional de Pintura, Escultura y Grabado "La Esmeralda" in Mexico City. His main influence at school was Jorge González Camarena, working with him as an assistant on a mural in the Palacio de Bellas Artes.

Since the early 1970s, he has had a career in art, sometimes creating works under the name of Antonio Sarpa. He currently lives in Tecámac, State of Mexico.

== Career ==
García’s first exhibition was of ink drawings at the Baltazar Martinez Gallery/Studio in Mexico City in 1973 when he was still in school. Since then other individual exhibitions have included an exhibition of acrylics at the Galería Chapultepec (with Enrique Revueltas), Dibujos Sanguíneos at the Casa del Lago of the Universidad Nacional Autónoma de México (with Eduardo León) (1976) and the Instituto de Artes of the Universidad Autonoma de Nuevo León (1977). He also exhibited at the Galería José María Velasco in Mexico City(1977) and at the Galería Fénix (with Eduardo León).

Collective exhibitions have included participation in the Cuarta bienal Museo de Arte Contemporáneo at the Museo de Arte Contemporáneo in Morelia, Mexico (2003), the Arte Lúdico event at the Alicia Brandy Gallery of Art in Buenos Aires (2005), participation in the Salón de Pintura y Escultura at the Centro Cultural Fox y Museo de Arte de León in León Guanajuato (2005), the Salón de la Plástica Mexicana en Paris event in France(2007) and Aus der Tief (2010) . The last was a show he participated with his brother Mauricio García Vega. Aus Der Tiefe (German: From the depths) exhibition which consisted of about fifty pieces such as paintings, reliefs and drawings, which were displayed in various venues, such as the Salón de la Plástica Mexicana, the Tecnológico de Estudios Superiores de Chimalhuacán and the Galería Abad Plácido Retmeier from 2010 to 2012.

His work was published in “Sección de Pintura” of the Salón Nacional de Artes Plasticas/Galería del Auditorio Nacional in 1987.

His recognitions include an honorary mention at the first Bienal Nacional de Artes Plásticas de la Juventud in San Miguel de Allende, Mexico (1978), third place at the Concurso de Cartel of the Secretaría de Salud in Mexico City (2005) and an honorary mention at the Salón Annual de Grabado y Dibujo of the Salón de la Plástica Mexicana (2010). His is also a member of the Salón de la Plástica Mexicana.

== Artistry ==
In his early career, his work leaned toward the fantastic, with an erotic feel, featuring humans transforming into something else such as birds. Elements of abstractionism also appeared early. He is quoted at that time as considering himself self-taught as school taught him nothing about how to express himself and that he did not like labels on his work.(alirico) In the late 1970s, he work took a darker turn, describing himself as “filled with rage and sadness”, creating art to fight against “dehumanization and to express ideas such as oppression and loneliness.

He began exhibiting with drawings, especially in ink and acrylics but since then much of his work has painting with mixed techniques in order to find new means of expression.

In his early career he stated that he was influenced by the work of Max Ernst and Chilean Roberto S. Mata since childhood. Since then other influences have included Francisco de Goya, Michelangelo, Caravaggio and Rembrandt as well as the neo figurativeism and symbolic expressionism movements.
