= Elizabeth Báthory in popular culture =

Popular culture references to the Hungarian countess

The influence of Countess Elizabeth Báthory in popular culture has been notable from the 18th century to the present day. Since her death, various myths and legends surrounding her story have preserved her as a prominent figure in folklore, literature, music, film, games and toys.

== In folklore and literature ==
The case of Countess Elizabeth Báthory inspired numerous stories and fairy tales. 18th and 19th century writers liberally added or omitted elements of the narrative. The most common motif of these works was that of the countess bathing in her victims' blood in order to retain beauty or youth. Frequently, the cruel countess would discover the secret of blood bathing when she slapped a female servant in rage, splashing parts of her own skin with blood. Upon removal of the blood, that portion of skin would seem younger and more beautiful than before.

This legend appeared in print for the first time in 1729, in the Jesuit scholar László Turóczi's Tragica Historia, the first written account of the Báthory case.

When quoting him in his 1742 history book, Matthias Bel was sceptical about this particular detail, he nevertheless helped the legend to spread. Subsequent writers of history and fiction alike often identified vanity as the sole motivation for Báthory's crimes.

Modern historians Radu Florescu and Raymond T. McNally have concluded that the theory Báthory murdered on account of her vanity sprang up from contemporary prejudices about gender roles. Women were not believed to be capable of violence for its own sake. At the beginning of the 19th century, the vanity motif was first questioned, and sadistic pleasure was considered a far more plausible motive for Báthory's crimes. In 1817, the witness accounts (which had surfaced in 1765) were published for the first time, demonstrating that the bloodbaths or blood seeker for vanity aspect of Báthory's crimes were legend rather than fact.

== Vampire myth ==
The emergence of the bloodbath or blood seeker for vanity myth coincided with the vampire scares that haunted Europe in the early 18th century, reaching even into educated and scientific circles, but the strong connection between the bloodbath or blood seeker myth and the vampiric myth was not made until the 1970s. The first connections were made to promote works of fiction by linking them to the already commercially successful Dracula story. Thus, a 1970 movie based on Báthory and the bloodbath or blood seeker for vanity myth was titled Countess Dracula.

Some Báthory biographers, McNally in particular, have tried to establish the bloodbath myth and the historical Elizabeth Báthory as a source of influence for Bram Stoker's 1897 novel Dracula, pointing to similarities in settings and motifs and the fact that Stoker might have read about her. This theory is strongly disputed by author Elizabeth Miller.

Meanwhile, Báthory has become an influence for modern vampire literature and vampire films. The story, while retaining the essential facts, receives an imaginative interpretation in the horror novelist Syra Bond's Cold Blood.

== Literature ==
- The Dracula Archives (1971) by Raymond Rudorff is a vampire novel that features Báthory.
- Our Lady of Pain (1974) by John Blackburn is a supernatural horror novel whose plot revolves around a play about Báthory being staged in modern Britain.
- In the Buffy the Vampire Slayer universe, Countess Elizabeth Báthory appears in the short story "Die Blutgrafin" from the Tales of the Slayer, Volume One anthology published in 2001. In this dark historical fiction tie-in, the Slayer Ildikó Géllert infiltrates Báthory's Čachtice Castle to investigate rumors of slaughtered maids and suspected vampirism.
- He Who Fights with Monsters 6: A LitRPG Adventure (2022) by Shirtaloon is a LitRPG adventure novel, which introduces a gold-rank vampire named Elizabeth, who along with other vampire of her power rank are awakened from centuries of slumber when Earth's levels of magic begin to rise and who sets out to establish a vampire kingdom throughout large swathes of Europe. Her power and cleverness allow her to deceive the protagonist Jason Asano and escape him when he attempts to betray and kill her and her fellows in an pocket dimension. She later establishes an empire in which humans are herded into camps and exsanguination centers, firmly denying that she was really Elizabeth Báthory (and killing anyone who continued to assert this) and managing to survive longer than most vampire lords - at least until Asano manages to return from his adventures in a parallel reality far more powerful than her.

== Film ==
There have been numerous films about Countess Elizabeth Báthory:

- 1970 – Necropolis (Franco Brocani), with Viva Auder as "Countess Bathory"
- 1971 – Countess Dracula (Peter Sasdy), with Ingrid Pitt as "Countess Elisabeth"
- 1971 – Daughters of Darkness (Harry Kümel), with Delphine Seyrig as "Countess Bathory"
- 1973 – Legend of Blood Castle (Ceremonia sangrienta) (Jorge Grau), with Lucia Bosé as "Erzebeth Bathory"
- 1973 – Curse of the Devil (Carlos Aured), with Maria Silva as "Elizabeth Bathory"
- 1973 – Immoral Tales (Walerian Borowczyk), with Paloma Picasso as "Elisabeth Bathory"
- 1979 – Thirst (Rod Hardy), starring Chantal Contouri as a lineal descendant of Elizabeth Bathory
- 1980 – Mama Dracula (Boris Szulzinger), with Louise Fletcher as "Mama Dracula"
- 1981 – Night of the Werewolf (Paul Naschy), with Julia Saly as "Countess Elisabeth Bathory"
- 2000 – Vampire Hunter D: Bloodlust (Yoshiaki Kawajiri), an anime film with Bibari Maeda and Julia Fletcher as "Countess Carmilla Elizabeth Bathory." This character is also a reference to the title character of Sheridan Le Fanu's novella Carmilla.
- 2004 – Eternal (Wilhelm Liebenberg and Federico Sanchez), with Caroline Néron as "Elizabeth Kane"
- 2005 – Night Fangs (Ricardo Islas), with Marina Muzychenko as "Countess Elizabeth Bathory"
- 2006 – Stay Alive (William Brent Bell), with Maria Kalinina as the "Countess"
- 2006 – Demon's Claw (Lloyd A. Simandl) (video), with Kira Reed as "Elizabeth Bathory"
- 2006 – Bram Stoker's Dracula's Curse (Leigh Scott), with Christina Rosenberg as "Countess Ezabet Bathorly"
- 2006 – Metamorphosis (Jenő Hódi)
- 2007 – Blood Scarab (Donald F. Glut) (video), with Monique Parent as "Countess Elizabeth Bathory"
- 2007 – Hellboy: Blood and Iron (Victor Cook and Tad Stones), an animated TV movie with Kath Soucie voicing the character of "Erszebet Ondrushko"
- 2007 – Hostel: Part II (Eli Roth), with Monika Malacova as "Mrs. Bathory"
- 2008 – Bathory: Countess of Blood (Juraj Jakubisko), starring Anna Friel as "Erzsébet Báthory"
- 2009 – The Countess (Julie Delpy), starring Delpy as "Erzsebet Bathory"
- 2013 – Chastity Bites (John V. Knowles), with Louise Griffiths as "Liz Batho/Elizabeth Bathory"
- 2014 – Documentary Movie (Pavel Novotny) 400 Years of bloody Countess - The secret behind the secret
- 2015 – Lady of Csejte (Blood Countess, U.K. title) with Svetlana Khodchenkova as Elizabeth Bathory.
- 2016 – Blood of the Tribades - The setting is called Bathory and the long last leader the villagers worship is named Bathor
- 2016 – The Neon Demon - The characters of Ruby, Sarah and Gigi are based on Elizabeth Báthory.
- 2026 – Báthory, a film guided by the voice of Elizabeth Bathory, directed by Carlos Atanes.

== Television ==
- 2015 – American Horror Story: Hotel, with Lady Gaga as “The Countess” Elizabeth
- 2018 – Lore (TV series) - The US horror series deals with the legend of the blood countess in season 2, episode 2.
- 2023 – Castlevania: Nocturne - A version of Báthory who has survived to the time of the French Revolution is the main antagonist.
- 2026 - Monster: The Lizzie Borden Story - in episode 1, the story of Báthory (portrayed by Vicky Krieps) bathing in blood is told, with her handmaidens (the Furies) responsible for the slaughter of innocent, beautiful girls from neighbouring villages.

== Video games ==
The bloodbath myth served as a major component of some games:

- A character based on Elizabeth Báthory, named Elizabeth Bartley, appears as the main antagonist of the video game Castlevania: Bloodlines (1994). In the game's story, she is introduced as the niece of series antagonist Dracula. After being killed in the early 16th century, she is revived 300 years later and orchestrates the assassination of Archduke Franz Ferdinand, starting World War I in order to use the souls of the deceased to resurrect Dracula. She is fought as the penultimate boss of the game, perishing as she completes the ritual to revive Dracula.
- A fan-made, five-mission campaign for Thief II: The Metal Age on PC.
- In the MMORPG Ragnarok Online, Bathories are witch-like enemies fought on the 4th basement floor of Clock Tower.
- In the MMORPG DarkEden, Lady Elizabeth Bathory is a game "boss" alongside Lord Vlad Tepes, who players are able to kill in an instanced level known as a "lair".
- In the MMORPG Atlantica Online, Countess Elizabeth Bathory is the boss of the dungeon Bran Castle alongside Lord Vlad Dracula.
- "The Countess" is a unique monster from Blizzard Entertainment's popular dungeon-crawler Diablo 2. The following passage is read in a rotting tome and initiates the quest:
  ... And so it came to pass that the Countess, who once bathed in the rejuvenating blood of a hundred virgins, was buried alive... And her castle in which so many cruel deeds took place fell rapidly into ruin. Rising over the buried dungeons in that god-forsaken wilderness, a solitary tower, like some monument to Evil, is all that remains. The Countess' fortune was believed to be divided among the clergy, although some say that more remains unfound, still buried alongside the rotting skulls that bear mute witness to the inhumanity of the human creature.
- In the video game Fate/Extra CCC, a recurring antagonist Lancer-class Servant is based on Báthory as a Heroic Spirit, who returns in the game's sequels Fate/Extella and Fate/Extella Link.
- The Elizabeth from CCC also appears in the game Fate/Grand Order as a Lancer (later two separate Lancers,) and as five broadly comedic event Servants for Halloween, including Elizabeth Báthory [Halloween] as a Caster, Elizabeth Báthory [Brave] as a Saber, Elizabeth Báthory [Cinderella] as a Rider, a robotic Alter Ego version called "Mecha Eli-chan" that also has a "Mk. II" counterpart, a childlike Pretender-class version fused with Shi Jin from the Chinese novel Water Margin named Nine-Tattoo Dragon Eliza, and an Avenger-class extraterrestrial from the Servant Universe named Elizabeth of the End, who serves as the priestess of the kaiju-like King Eliza (also an iteration of Elizabeth.) In addition to the previous Servants, whom are based on her 14-year-old self, an Assassin and Rider Servant under the alias of "Carmilla" is her own existence in her adult age, succumbing to her dark side. The younger Elizabeth despises her older self, and wishes to never become like her, instead enjoying being a JPOP idol.
- In the video game Vampire Hunter D, the main antagonist addresses herself as Elizabeth Bartley Carmilla, also referencing the title character of Sheridan Le Fanu's novella Carmilla.
- The Butcheress from the video game BloodRayne claims to be her descendant.
- In the video game Resident Evil Village, antagonist Alcina Dimitrescu bears strong resemblance to Báthory, and takes sadistic pleasure in torturing her victims before killing them and drinking their blood,
- In the video game Ninja Gaiden 2, the female villain named Elizabet is seen bathing nude in a pool of blood and her demonic power seems to be that of using blood to attack her foes.
- In the role-playing game Nightlife, Báthory appears as a Vampyre NPC living under the alias Lisa "Blood" Bath. She is the lead for an unsigned hardcore/heavy metal band called Krypt.
- In the 2010 role-playing video game expansion Dragon Age: Origins – Awakening, a Baroness (dead at the time the game takes place) abducts and kills young female villagers and uses their blood for rejuvenating rituals.
- In the 2004 PlayStation 2 videogame Primal, there is a young Elizabeth in a Carpathian castle who seems destined to grow up to be Elizabeth Báthory.
- In Mortal Kombat, the Fatality Tutorial mentions Elizabeth Báthory as the DLC character Skarlet's favorite historical figure, due to the character's blood-based powers.
- The indefinitely halted video game Shadow of the Eternals was intended to have Elizabeth Báthory as a major character and possible villain, with the main protagonist Clara being a handmaiden and lover/confidante of her.
- In the Mass Effect series, a female human plastic surgeon named Erzsebet Vidmar killed 30 Asari to harvest a genetic compound which is responsible for slowing the aging process, in an attempt to access the thousand-year lifespan Asari are known for.
- While Báthory does not appear directly in the game, one of the villains in Fire Emblem Gaiden and its remake Fire Emblem Echoes: Shadows of Valentia is the witch Nuibaba; she would kidnap young, beautiful women and sacrifice them to attain eternal beauty, somewhat in a similar vein to Elizabeth Báthory.
- In For Honor, The name of the playable female Black Prior is Erzabet. Erzabet is the Hungarian form of Elizabeth, and likely references Elizabeth Báthory.
- The Tekken series features a playable female vampire character named Eliza, possibly short for Elizabeth.
- In Warframe, Garuda, a warframe based around gore and blood, has an alternate helmet called "Bathory" which is a nod towards Elizabeth Báthory.
- In the game Bloodborne, the character Yharnam, Pthumerian Queen is theorized to have taken certain aspects from Elizabeth Báthory, such as blood sacrifices for immortality.

== Toys ==
Báthory is featured in McFarlane Toys' 6 Faces of Madness series, a collection of action figures which also includes Jack the Ripper, Rasputin and Vlad the Impaler. Báthory is depicted bathing in blood while the heads of some of her victims are impaled in a candelabrum. Bathory was also made as a doll in the Living Dead Dolls series.

In the board game The Harbingers, which is part of the Atmosfear series of interactive video board games, Elizabeth Bathory was one of the six playable harbingers in the game, portrayed as a vampiress. Prior to that, she had her own added expansion set to the first Atmosfear game; Nightmare.

In the card game Sentinels of the Multiverse, Blood Countess Bathory is the leader of the Court of Blood, a playable "Environment" deck. She is periodically featured in the storytelling podcast based on the game, The Letters Page.

== Music ==
- The Brazilian death metal/black metal band Siren’s Embrace released the album Erzebeth, on the 30th of December 2025, on Spotify and Apple Music. It consists of 10 songs which narrate the story of Elizabeth Báthory from a new perspective - the album tells the story of Elizabeth Báthory as a symbol of corrupted power and femininity, which entered history envolted in myth.
- Elizabetta (2019), opera in two acts by Gabriel Prokofiev, with libretto by David Pountney, premiered in Regensburg, Germany, 2019.
- Báthory Erzsébet (2012), Hungarian musical-opera by composers György Szomor and Péter Pejtsik, with libretto by Tibor Miklós.
- Countess Báthory (Báthoryčka), is a 1994 opera by the Slovak composer Ilja Zeljenka, with libretto by Peter Maťo, after Jonáš Záborský.
- The Lady of Čachtice (Čachtická pani) is a 1931 opera by the Czech composer Miloš Smatek, with libretto in Slovak by Quido Maria Vyskočil and Elena Krčmáryová.
- Erzsebet is an opera by French composer Charles Chaynes.
- A Bestia: Báthory Erzsébet véres legendája (The Beast: The Bloody Legend of Erzsébet Báthory) is a Hungarian rock opera by Béla Szakcsi Lakatos and Géza Csemer.
- Báthory Erzsébet, opera (premiered in Budapest, 1913) by Hungarian composer Sándor Szeghő (1874–1956).
- "Elisabetha", song by Gothic metal band Darkwell. There are two versions of this song, one with Stephanie Luzie as vocalist.
- Erzsébet: Elizabeth Bathory: The Opera is by Dennis Báthory-Kitsz (he claims he may be related to her).
- The extreme metal band Cradle of Filth dedicated their album Cruelty and the Beast (1998) entirely to her, telling her story with a certain degree of artistic license, but keeping the main details of her story intact. There are two versions of the album cover, both feature a woman bathed in a tub of blood. References to Elizabeth Báthory occur throughout the band's work.
- The German band Untoten have released a concept album about her, called Die Blutgräfin.
- French singer Juliette (Nourredine) mentions La Bathory in her song "Tueuses" from her 1996 album Rimes Féminines along with numerous famous female criminals.
- Australian/Japanese unit GPKISM have released two EPs about Báthory, Barathrum (meaning Hell) and Iudicium (meaning fate, judgement or trial).
- Russian black metal band Messiya had released an EP dedicated to her called Erzebet in the year 2009.
- Channeling of Lady Elizabeth Bathory is a live album by multigenre jam band Stefanik, Perny & Kollar featuring Kofi recorded in Višňové village, under Čachtice Castle in 2010.
- Underground hip-hop artist Killah Priest named his album Elizabeth in reference to her.

Songs about Elizabeth Báthory include:

- "Countess Bathory" by the English black metal band Venom, from their highly influential album Black Metal.
- "Woman of Dark Desires" by the Swedish black metal band Bathory, from the album Under the Sign of the Black Mark.
- "Beauty Through Order" is by the American thrash metal band Slayer, from the album World Painted Blood.
- "Channeling Of Lady Elizabeth Bathory" is a live composition by Slovak experimental band Stefanik, Perny & Kollar feat. Kofi from second album Channeling Of Lady Elizabeth Bathory.
- "Elizabeth" is a song by progressive symphonic metal band Kamelot composed of three parts – "Part I: Mirror Mirror", "Part II: Requiem for the Innocent" and "Part III: Fall From Grace", from their 2001 album Karma.
- Swiss heavy metal band Burning Witches song and title track, "The Dark Tower" is about Elizabeth Báthory with lyrics calling her "Satan's number one."
- "Elizabeth" by Czech Gothic rock band XIII Stoleti, from the album Ztraceni v Karpatech (1998).
- "Elisabeth Bathory" by Hungarian black metal band Tormentor, which was covered by Swedish black metal band Dissection.
- "Elizabeth" by Swedish heavy metal band Ghost from their debut album Opus Eponymous.
- "Bathory's Sainthood" by American hardcore band Boy Sets Fire (2003).
- "Báthory Erzsébet" by experimental doom metal band Sunn O))) is a cover of "A Fine Day To Die" by Bathory.
- "Countess Erzsebet Nadasdy" by Finnish black metal band Barathrum.
- "Villa Vampiria" by death metal band God Dethroned.
- "Transylvanian Pearl" by Russian metal band Nocticula.
- "Elizabeth" by American horror punk band Aiden, from the album Knives
- "Buried Dreams", the title track from the 1987 album of the same name by the British industrial band Clock DVA, sing-speaks to Elizabeth Báthory in her prison cell after being convicted of her crimes, wondering what she thinks about her past.
- "Torquemada 71", by English stoner metal band Electric Wizard, from the album Witchcult Today.
- "The Bleeding Baroness" by the metal band Candlemass from their album Death Magic Doom (2009), featuring Robert Lowe on vocals, shows some similarities to Countess Báthory's story. Additionally, Candlemass, featuring Messiah Marcolin on vocals, had also released a single/cover version of the Venom song, "Countess Bathory".
- "Resurrection" and "Schwarzer Engel" by Spanish Gothic metal band Forever Slave tell the story of Erzsebet Báthory.
- "Bathe in Blood" by Evile (taken from 2007's Enter the Grave).
- "Rose of Pain" from the album Blue Blood by X Japan.
- The song "An Execution", a B-side on the "Cities in Dust" single by Siouxsie and the Banshees, was based on the "myth" of Countess Báthory. Banshees guitarist John Valentine Carruthers states, "She (Siouxsie) was reading this book about Countess Bathory, called Was Dracula A Woman? or something. She used to (sic.) bath in the blood of virgins in the vain hope it would keep you young".
- "The Wrath of Satan's Whore" by Dutch black metal band Countess.
- "Salva Me" by Norwegian doom metal band The 3rd and the Mortal.
- "Sweet Elizabeth" by New York band Valley Lodge.
- The third section of the song "Steroids (Crouching Tiger Hidden Gabber)" by Death Grips, popularly known as "Bald Head Girl", mentions her.
- "The Iron Maiden and the Dreamy Princess" by Japanese vocaloid producer Joruzin.

Bands named after Elizabeth Báthory include:

- The influential Swedish black metal band Bathory take their name from Elizabeth, and mention her in some songs, one being "Woman of Dark Desires".
- American band Ellsbeth take their name from Elizabeth. They released a concept album about her named Well Dressed Killing Machine in 2009.
- German heavy metal band Elisabetha take their name from her.
- Mexican heavy metal band Erzsebeth take their name from her and released a concept album about her named La Condesa Inmortal in 2007.
- Colombian black metal band Erzebet take their name from her.
- American Gothic metal band Erzebet take their name from her.
- British black metal band Blood Countess are named after her.
