= The Countess (film) =

2009 French-German historical film

- Theatrical release poster
- Directed by: Julie Delpy
- Written by: Julie Delpy
- Produced by: Andro Steinborn; Christopher Tuffin; Julie Delpy; Matthew E. Chausse
- Starring: Julie Delpy; Daniel Brühl; William Hurt; Anamaria Marinca
- Cinematography: Martin Ruhe
- Edited by: Andrew Bird
- Music by: Julie Delpy
- Production companies: X Filme International; Social Capital Films; EMC Filmproduktion; Fanes Film; The Steel Company; Tempête Sous un Crâne; X Filme Creative Pool
- Distributed by: X-Verleih (though Warner Bros.; Germany); BAC Films (France)
- Release date: 9 February 2009 (Berlinale)
- Running time: 98 min.
- Countries: France; Germany
- Language: English

The Countess is a 2009 French-German historical crime thriller drama written and directed by Julie Delpy, who also composed its score. It stars Delpy, Daniel Brühl and William Hurt. It is based on the life of the notorious Hungarian countess Elizabeth Báthory.

The film is the third directorial effort by Delpy, who has said of the project that "it sounds like a gothic [story] but it's more a drama. It's more focusing on the psychology of human beings when they're given power."

== Plot ==
In 1560, Elizabeth Báthory is born into the Hungarian noble Báthory family, the daughter of general George Báthory of Ecsed. From an early age, Elizabeth's parents raise her to accept hardness and cruelty. As a teenager, Elizabeth is impregnated by a young peasant lover and is forced to watch as he is brutally tortured and executed before her eyes; Elizabeth's mother takes the child away from her directly after its birth, ensuring that she never sees him again. Elizabeth is later married to Count Ferenc Nádasdy, with whom she has three children. After Nádasdy's return from the Ottoman-Hungarian Wars, he succumbs to a disease he contracted abroad and dies.

Elizabeth, now the sole heir of her husband's vast estate, seeks recognition from the Hungarian Habsburg Emperor Matthias. Matthias consents reluctantly due to his considerable debt to the Countess. At a ball, she meets Count György Thurzó's 21-year-old son, István, and falls in love with him. After a night together, István is forced by his father to end the relationship and marry the daughter of a wealthy merchant in Denmark. Elizabeth, 39, believes that their age difference is to blame for the failure of the relationship. After an incident in which she is splashed with blood after striking a female servant, Elizabeth starts to believe that bathing in the blood of virgin girls can help her achieve eternal youth and beauty, a belief reinforced by her sycophantic servants who insist her skin is suddenly much smoother. To this end, her staff capture and brutally kill peasant girls to obtain their blood.

It is only when Elizabeth starts to kidnap aristocratic girls that the authorities begin an investigation. Count Thurzó is asked to investigate the incidents, and he thus sends István, now a count himself, to visit Elizabeth. István reluctantly goes to visit her, and they spend a passionate night together. István, despite his affections for the countess, still suspects the countess and when he and one of his companions discover evidence of her crime, they arrest her. During the trial, Elizabeth is found guilty, and, due to her noble origin, she is sentenced to spend the rest of her life walled into her room in Čachtice Castle in total isolation. Elizabeth's staff are also found guilty, but unlike her they are put to death. All of her estate is awarded to the Count Thurzó with the exception of Čachtice, which is given to her children.

Driven by desperation after being walled in, Elizabeth Báthory commits suicide. She is then buried without a coffin in a humble grave, with no funeral ceremony. The film casts doubt on the sentence, suggesting that much of the happenings have been manipulated by Count Thurzó.

== Cast ==
- Julie Delpy as Countess Elizabeth Báthory
- William Hurt as Count György Thurzó
- Daniel Brühl as István Thurzó
- Adriana Altaras as Aunt Klara Báthory
- Charly Hübner as Count Ferenc Nádasdy
- Anamaria Marinca as the witch Anna Darvulia
- Sebastian Blomberg as Dominic Vizakna
- Andy Gatjen as Miklos
- Rolf Kanies as Count Krajevo
- Jesse Inman as Emperor Matthias
- Jeanette Hain as Anna Báthory
- Frederick Lau as Janos
- Henriette Confurius as Kayla
- Nikolai Kinski as The Teacher

== Release ==
The film premiered on 9 February 2009 at the 59th Berlin International Film Festival and was shown at the Cannes Film Festival 2010.

== Critical reception ==
The Countess received negative reviews. Boyd van Hoeij wrote in Variety, "Though some individual moments work, Delpy's screenplay lacks psychological connective tissue. It never becomes clear why a powerful and intelligent woman was brought to her knees by a cute kid, only to turn murderous and possibly insane when deprived of her object of affection."

In his review for the Associated Press, Kirk Honeycutt wrote that fans of Delpy and arthouse films would be disappointed: "The film is beautifully and lovingly produced with cool, deeply burnished cinematography inside the palace and out. Costumes, editing and Delpy's music all consistently support the high tone taken toward this bloody tale. One appreciates The Countess. But it neither terrifies nor illuminates."

== See also ==
- Elizabeth Báthory in popular culture
