= The Blood Confession =

2006 novel by Alisa M. Libby

- First edition
- Author: Alisa M. Libby
- Language: English
- Genre: Historical fantasy
- Publisher: Dutton
- Media type: Print (Hardcover)
- Pages: 389
- ISBN: 978-0-525-47732-7
- OCLC: 62322115
- LC Class: PZ7.L591177 Bl 2006
- Followed by: The King's Rose

The Blood Confession is a 2006 historical fiction novel written by Alisa M. Libby. The novel is a revisionist telling of the legend of Countess Elizabeth Báthory, with elements of the fairy tale Snow White.

== Plot ==
The book follows the character of Countess Erzebet, a young noblewoman held prisoner while being charged with murder. As the book unfolds, Erzebet tells her life's story, from her ill-omened birth to the crimes she is charged with.

== Reception ==
The Blood Confession received a positive review from Strange Horizons, stating that while "first half of the book does wander... it is in its modern connotations that Libby's book really soars and disturbs". Kirkus Reviews praised "Libby’s combination of history, fairy tales and the Bible" but stated that it was "a conceptually interesting but sluggishly paced gothic horror". The Bulletin of the Center for Children's Books wrote that the book was "not for the faint of heart" and that "this first person narrative doesn’t leave out any of the gory details." The School Library Journal praised the book's characterizations while stating that the book's "depiction of Erzebet's descent into madness is overly lengthy".
