= Ferenc Nádasdy =

Hungarian noble, politician (1555–1604)

Ferenc II Nádasdy
- Baron; Count
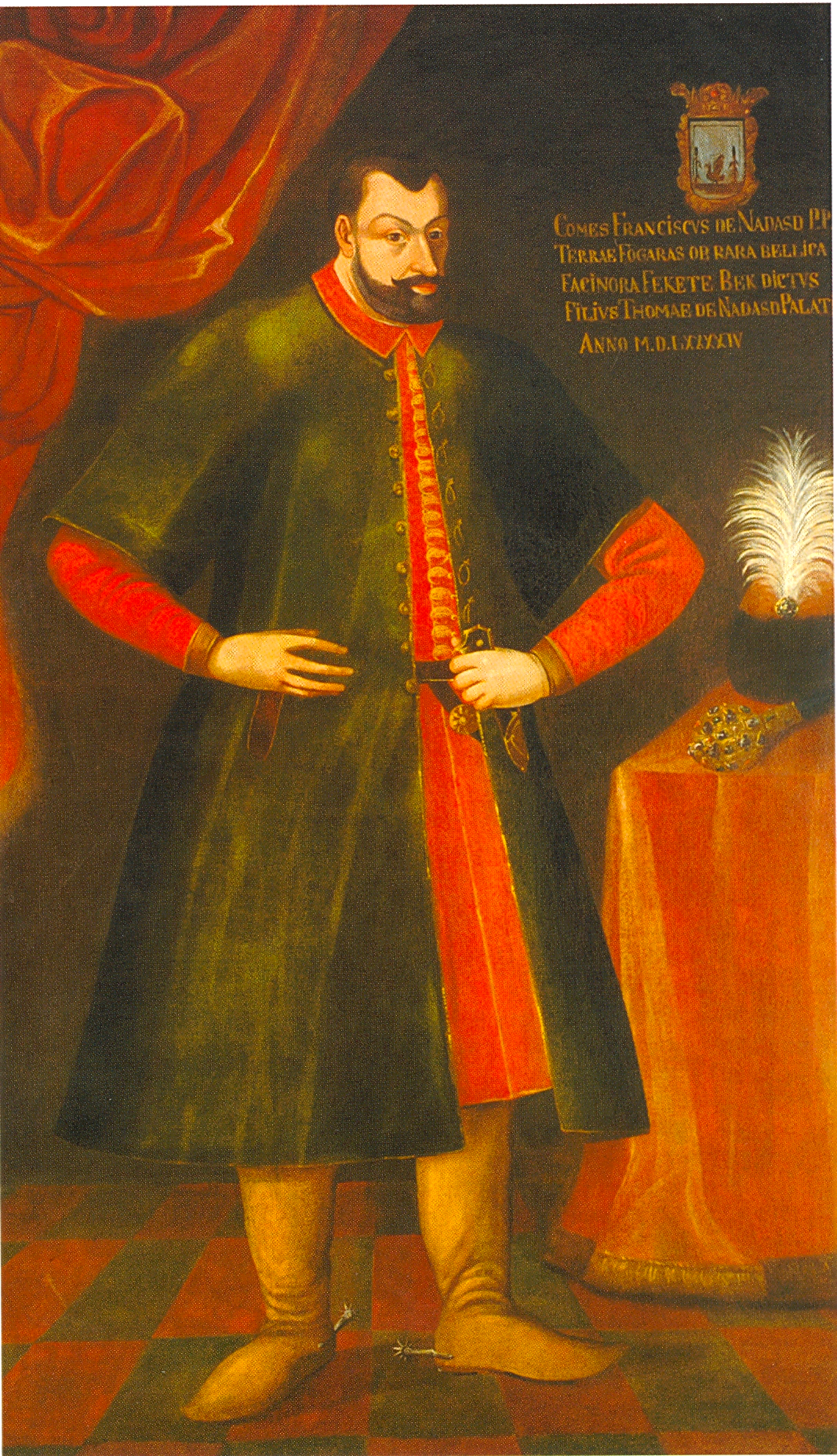
- Full name: Ferenc Nádasdy of Nádasd and Fogarasföld
- Born: 6 October 1555; Sárvár, Kingdom of Hungary
- Died: 4 January 1604 (aged 48); Sárvár, Kingdom of Hungary
- Noble family: Nádasdy
- Spouse: Elizabeth Báthory (m. 1575)
- Issue: Anna; Orsika; Katalin; András; Paul
- Father: Baron Tamás Nádasdy de Nádasd et Fogarasföld
- Mother: Orsolya Kanizsay de Kanizsa

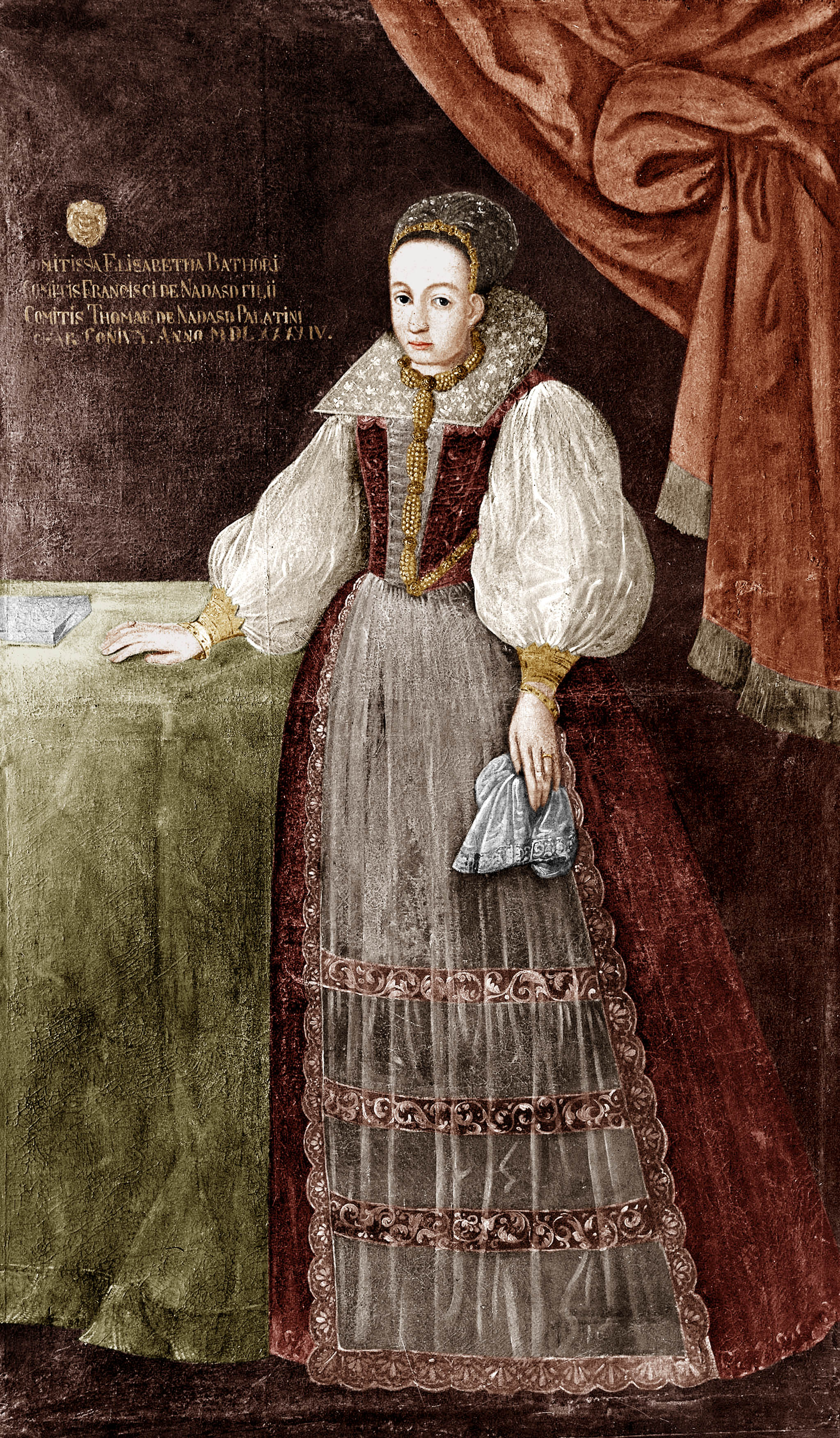
Portrait of Ferenc's wife, Countess Elizabeth Báthory

Count Ferenc II Nádasdy de Nádasd et Fogarasföld (6 October 1555 – 4 January 1604) was a Hungarian nobleman, politician, and a distinguished soldier. His family, the Nádasdy family, was one of the wealthiest and most influential of the era in Hungary. In 1571, when Ferenc was 16, his mother, Orsolya Nádasdy (née Kanizsay de Kanizsa; 1521–1571), using her association with many noble families in Hungary, organized a marriage to the young Elizabeth Báthory, daughter of the Count György Báthory of Ecsed and his wife and cousin, Baroness Anna Báthory of Somlyó (1539–1570). The Báthory family were as rich and illustrious as the Nádasdy family, though older and more influential, since they had several relatives who had the charge of Nádor (palatine) of Hungary. Among them, included a cardinal, a King of Poland-Lithuania, and a Prince of Transylvania.

== Early life ==
At the age of 14, Ferenc became engaged to a ten-year-old Elizabeth Báthory. He invited her to move into the Nádasdy Castle, Castle Sárvár, situated in Vas County in western Hungary. Ferenc, unlike his wife, could barely read and write in his mother tongue. He is said to have had a basic understanding of the Latin and German languages, which he intended to use while mediating the Hungarian wars. His wife, on the other hand, was known to be one of the most educated women of the time. Not only could she read and write, but spoke with great fluency in additional languages, such as Latin, German and Greek.

== Family life ==
On 8 May 1575, Ferenc and Elizabeth married at Castle Varannó in what is today Vranov, Slovakia. They were 19 and 14, respectively. More than 4,500 guests attended the wedding. By mutual agreement, Ferenc adopted the maiden name of his wife, and not vice versa. At the time, the name Báthory was more honorable than Nádasdy. After the wedding, the new lords of Nádasdy, along with Orsolya and other Nádasdy family members went to live in Csejte.

Čachtice Castle, located in present-day Slovakia, was originally built in the 13th century. It was constructed by the gens Hont-Pázmány, a notable clan in Hungary at the time. The castle's strategic position on a hilltop served as an excellent observation post for monitoring the road that connected Hungary to Moravia, which is now part of the Czech Republic.

The castle later came into the possession of Matt Csak, a member of the influential Stibor dynasty. This transition reflects the changing power dynamics in the region during the medieval period.

The Nádasdy and Báthory families, both prominent Hungarian noble families, acquired Čachtice Castle as part of a wedding dowry. The castle, along with seventeen surrounding villages, was a significant gift, indicating the wealth and power of these families.

In 1578 Count Ferenc took over one of the flanks of the Hungarian army. Due to his frequent trips away from home, he did not conceive a first child with his wife for 10 years. Their first child, Anna, was born in 1585 and was later to become the wife of Nikola VI Zrinski. Their other known children include Orsolya (Orsika) Nádasdy (1590 – unknown) who would later become the wife of István II Benyó; Katalin (Kata or Katherina) Nádasdy (1594 – unknown); András Nádasdy (1596–1603); and Pál (Paul) Nádasdy (1598–1650), father of Franz III. Nádasdy.

== Military life ==
Count Ferenc Nádasdy was also known as the Black Bey or the Black Knight of Hungary due to his military prowess and was a notable military figure in Hungary during the late 16th century. As a soldier, in the Ottoman–Habsburg wars, Ferenc helped recapture the castles of Esztergom, Waitzen, Visegrád and Székesfehérvár from Ottoman rule, and later took part in the recapture of Győr during the Long Turkish War (1593–1606). These fortresses had been held by the Ottoman Empire. Thanks to the intervention of the Count, the Hungarians held a major advantage over the Turks. At this time, the central-southern part of Christian Hungary was under Ottoman occupation. The military career, of Ferenc, flowed beside one of his best friends, the noble Hungarian Nicholas Pálffy, who was considered one of the most important military commanders of his time. Pálffy had the full support of Rudolf II, the Habsburg King of Hungary and Holy Roman Emperor. He was noted for his struggle against the Ottoman Turks, eventually receiving the title of Count of Pozsony (later Pressburg, today Bratislava). During his long period of military service, Count Nádasdy was known for great courage in battle and also, for his extreme cruelty to all Ottoman prisoners.

== Death ==
On 4 January 1604, Ferenc, the Black Knight of Hungary, died of a mysterious and sudden illness in the middle of a battle. The disease which killed Count Ferenc Nádasdy is still unknown. It is known, however, that he had suffered a disease of the lower limbs for at least two years before succumbing to the illness.

== Aftermath ==
After Nadasdy's death, the wealth and properties were inherited by his widow, Elizabeth Bathory. From 1610, a confused, conceptual lawsuit took place against the widow and on 29 December she was sentenced to house arrest in the castle. They could not handle the lawsuit in an official way. In July 1614, the testament of the Countess left her estate to her children. The process against Elizabeth ended with her death a month later. The descendants of Ferenc and Elizabeth were banished from Hungary and went to Poland. Although some returned to Hungary after 1640, that was the end of the noble status of the Báthory-Nádasdy family in Hungary.
