= Grabsteinland III Herz Der Finsternis =

Grabsteinland III Herz der Finsternis

Studio album by Untoten
- Released: (Germany) November 7, 2005
- Recorded: Grafenwald Studios, Berlin
- Genre: electronic music Gothic rock Darkwave
- Length: 54:03
- Label: Von Grafenwald (Germany)
- Producer: David A. Line; Greta Csatlós

Untoten chronology
| Grabsteinland II Herrschaft der Vampire (2004) | Grabsteinland III Herz der Finsternis (2005) | Die Blutgräfin (2006) |

Grabsteinland III Herz der Finsternis is the tenth album of Untoten.

== Track listing ==
1. "Irrlicht"– 1:39
2. "Mit Den Augen Der Nacht"– 3:20
3. "Herz der Finsternis"– 5:16
4. "Nachtgespenst"– 3:21
5. "Des Raben Flug"– 4:26
6. "Der Herzen viele ass ich"– 3:04
7. "Mit dem Wind"– 1:31
8. "Hexenfieber"– 2:37
9. "Dämonenwelt"– 4:10
10. "Du bleibst was du warst"– 2:18
11. "Raubtieraugen"-4:25
12. "Ankunft"-1:19
13. "Wintermärchen"-3:42
14. "Vollmondengel"-2:42
15. "Niemals niemals"-3:44
16. "Epilog"-4:54
17. "Abschied"-4:15

== Info ==
- All tracks written and produced by David A. Line
- Male vocals by David A. Line
- Female vocals by Greta Csatlós
- Album artwork by Greta Csatlós
