= Schwarze Messe =

Studio album by Untoten
- Released: (Germany) October 1, 1999
- Genre: electronic music Gothic rock Darkwave
- Length: 0:43:18
- Label: Sonic Malade (Germany)
- Producer: David A. Line

Untoten chronology
Schwarze Messe (1999)	Vampire Book (2000)

Schwarze Messe is the fourth album by German musical group Untoten.

== Track listing ==
1. "Lilith"– 5:22
2. "Die Freundlose Gasse"– 0:47
3. "Tanz der Hexen"– 4:26
4. "Desdemona"– 5:56
5. "Nekrolog"– 0:51
6. "Black Blood"– 6:01
7. "Gunshot Wounds"– 0:55
8. "Church of Littleton"– 8:57
9. "Seraphine"– 4:13
10. "Autumnal Equinox (Schwarze Messe)"– 5:50

== Info ==
- All tracks written and produced by David A. Line
- Male vocals by David A. Line
- Female vocals by Greta Csatlós
