= Die Blutgräfin =

Die Blutgräfin - Elisabeth Báthory (1560-1614) „Ein schwarzromantisches Singspiel“

Studio album by Untoten
- Released: November 6, 2006
- Recorded: Grafenwald Studios, Berlin
- Genre: electronic music Gothic rock Darkwave
- Length: 99:58
- Label: Von Grafenwald (Germany)
- Producer: David A. Line

Untoten chronology
| Grabsteinland III Herz Der Finsternis (2005) | Die Blutgräfin - Elisabeth Báthory (1560-1614) „Ein schwarzromantisches Singspiel“ (2006) | Best of Untoten (2007) |

Die Blutgräfin is the eleventh album of Untoten. It is a concept album based on the life of Elizabeth Báthory.

== Track listing ==
All tracks written and produced by David A. Line

Disk 1:

1. "Schauplatz des Verbrechens" – 1:38
2. "„Nur ein Tropfen Blut!“" – 4:20
3. "Die Jagd" – 4:37
4. "Blutrot, die Liebe" – 5:43
5. "Die Gräfin des Blutes" – 2:32
6. "Geistermädchen" – 3:40
7. "Unheimlich" – 1:32
8. "Blutmond" – 5:07
9. "Alraunenblut" – 1:36
10. "„Ich wär so gern...“" – 2:40
11. "Hure der Finsternis" – 5:52
12. "Der Singvogel" – 1:30
13. "Koste das Blut!" – 5:23
14. "Bluthochzeit" – 4:52
15. "Jedem das Seine" – 3:45

Disk 2:

1. "Lustgarten (Vorspiel)" – 2:13
2. "Ficzko" – 4:35
3. "In den Katakomben" – 1:22
4. "Die Grube und das Pendel" – 4:20
5. "Domine" – 0:32
6. "Die Zeit steht still" – 5:55
7. "Hexenreich" – 3:54
8. "Blitz und Donner" – 4:09
9. "Zauberspiegel" – 1:15
10. "Blutopfer" – 4:57
11. "Flieg nun davon!" – 1:58
12. "Die Gruft" – 4:30
13. "Die Saat des Bösen" – 5:55

== Personnel ==
- David A. Line – vocals
- Greta Csatlós – vocals
