= Untoten =

German band

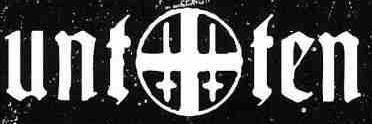

Background information
- Origin: Berlin, Germany
- Genres: Chanson, Neue Deutsche Härte, metal, gothic rock, darkwave
- Years active: 1994–present
- Labels: Von Grafenwald
- Members: David A. Line; Greta Csatlós

Untoten (German: The Undead) is a German band based in Berlin. It was founded by David A. Line and female vocalist Greta Csatlós in 1994. The lyrics are written primarily in German and English, supported by female vocals.

== History ==
Untoten released their first Demo CD Maultot in 1994. Eventually, they were signed to the music label Von Grafenwald.

Hab' kein Angst, Veluzifer, the band's debut album was released in 1996. Much of the lyrical content is inspired by vampire tales and the macabre.

In 1999, the band released their fourth full-length album Schwarze Messe. The music consists of classical and electronic influences. The band's album artwork is made by Greta Csatlós.

Their next album The Look of Blasphemie appeared in 2001.

In 2003, Untoten released their seventh full-length album Grabsteinland I Durch den Kristallwald. "Mit Den Augen Der Nacht", "Cynthia", "Alexanderplatz", and "Willst Du? (Remix)" are among some notably popular tracks from Grabsteinland I Durch den Kristallwald.

The band released their next album Grabsteinland II Herrschaft der Vampire in 2004. Untoten have performed live shows in Germany to promote their record releases and continue to perform in music festivals with such notable artists as ASP, Emilie Autumn, Absurd Minds, Cinema Strange, Subway To Sally, Suicide Commando, Front 242, Front Line Assembly, Saltatio Mortis, Dreadful Shadows, and Funker Vogt.

In 2005, they released the third installment in the Grabsteinland trilogy Grabsteinland III Herz Der Finsternis.

Later in November 2006, Untoten presented their eleventh album Die Blutgräfin. This album is named after Hungarian Countess Elizabeth Bathory, who was dubbed Die Blutgräfin (German: The Blood Countess) for killing young virgin girls for their blood.

David A. Line also start many side-projects: SOKO Friedhof, Engelwerk, Paloma im Blute, Candy's trash till death, Blood splattered bride and he produced project by other Soko Friedhof's member Demian Hildebrandt named Festival der Geisteskranken...

Out on 5 November 2007, is the newest Untoten album "Die Nonnen von Loudon". Untoten's David A. Line and singer/actress Greta Csatlos worked out 2 completely different album versions for this release, a rock and a barock version.

== Band members ==
- David A. Line – male vocals, composition and lyrics
- Greta Csatlós – female vocals and visual concept

== Discography ==
=== Albums ===
- 1996: Hab' keine Angst, Veluzifer
- 1997: Kiss of Death
- 1998: Nekropolis
- 1999: Schwarze Messe
- 2000: Vampire book
- 2001: The look of blasphemie
- 2003: Grabsteinland I Durch den Kristallwald
- 2004: Grabsteinland II Herrschaft der Vampire
- 2005: Grabsteinland III Herz der Finsternis
- 2006: Die Blutgräfin
- 2007: Die Nonnen von Loudun
- 2008: Die Hexe
- 2009: Grabsteinland IV Die schwarze Feder
- 2010: Liebe oder Tod
- 2010: Haus der Lüge
- 2011: Zombie 1 – die Welt danach
- 2011: Zombie 2 – the Revenge
- 2012: Eisenherz
- 2013: Zeitmaschine
- 2014: Like a Lost Child
- 2015: Grabsteinland V: Die Rückkehr

=== Other ===
- 1994: In den Mund genommen, Poser (Demo)
- 1995: Maultot (Demo)
- 2000: Schwarzherzlichst (VHS)
- 2002: Dresscode black II: Get into the goth club (Untoten vs SOKO Friedhof)
- 2004: Raben (CDS)
- 2007: Best Of
- 2009: Akustisch: Des Raben Flug
- 2012: How to become Undead (Rarities 1990–2000)

=== Exclusive tracks appearing on compilations ===
- ZilloScope: New Signs & Sounds 11/1998 – Doom (Gekürzte Version)
- Angels' Delight 2 – Black Blood
- Schattentanz I – Tanz Der Hexen
- Dresscode black I – Shake (Exclusive Track), Lilith, Sperm finger
- The Black Book Compilation – Goths Paradise IV – Abdomination
- Extreme Jenseithymnen 2 – Strange Inside
- Nachtschwärmer 6 – Mit Den Augen Der Nacht
- Orkus Compilation X – Alexanderplatz
- Nachtschwärmer 7 – Rabenlied
- Orkus Presents The Best of 2004 (Part 1) – Lichtbringer
- Sonic Seducer – 10 Jahre Jubiläums – Herz Der Finsternis (Edit)
- New Signs & Sounds 11/2006 (Zillo Compilation) – Die Jagd
