= Darkeden =

DarkEden
- Developer(s): SOFTON Entertainment
- Publisher(s): SOFTON Entertainment
- Platform(s): Windows
- Release: ^{SK} June 15, 2000 (Alpha)^{TH} August 6, 2004^{JP} February 2006^{NA} Scheduled 2011^{GL} January 3, 2008
- Genre(s): MMORPG

DarkEden is a free-to-play massively multiplayer online role-playing computer game in isometric projection or 3/4 perspective developed and published by SOFTON (formerly Metrotech). The game has a horror theme based on a war between humans (Slayers), vampires and Ousters in a region called Helea located in a fictional country of Eastern Europe known as Eslania. The original version of the game, and the most advanced one, is the Korean one from which several other versions have been derived from such as the Japanese, Chinese, Thai and International versions. The Thai and international versions were closed.

== Story ==
Vlad Tepes, Elizabeth Bathory, and Gilles de Rais, three of the twelve master vampires, form an alliance and enter the mountainous area of Helea, killing every person they find. They then attempt to awaken Lilith, the mother of all vampires, so that they can have her power. Opening her tomb does not awaken her, but it does create a cloud over Helea that blocks the sun, making Helea a dark eden for vampires.

The human world responded by isolating the region and sending in their militaries to try to rid the area of vampires.

The master vampires soon discover that the only way to gain the power they seek is to search for the pieces of Lilith's soul, which were scattered about the area of Helea. Unwilling to share this power, they break their alliance and begin a civil war.

Later, an ancient race of people known as the Ousters awakens from their long sleep and are shocked to see what the vampires and humans have done to Helea. They begin to attempt to wipe them from the area.

== Gameplay ==
DarkEden is an MMORPG, which requires the players to kill hordes of monsters, fight bosses and complete quests in order to make their character progress. This character progression varies according to the different races. Slayers only have to attack a monster or player to gain experience points. Vampires need to kill a monster or player and drink its blood to gain the maximum experience points available, whereas ousters just have to kill to gain these points. For the same monster, ousters gain more experience points out of them than vampires do even when drinking their blood. Each of the races have a special advantage: the slayers sell the heads and skulls of monsters at the highest prices to npc, the vampires drop the best items out of the three races, and the ousters get experience points the quickest.

DarkEden is oriented toward player versus player. Except for few safe zones, players can be attacked without any restriction at any moment by other players. Players may change the race of their character during their progression. If a human is bitten by a vampire, they will turn into a vampire unless they cure themselves in time. Vampire characters can choose to turn humans by talking to an NPC who will do the work for them. There are three different time periods that regulate the battles in Helea, with different circumstances and power dynamics between the races.

== Business model ==
DarkEden allows players to either play for free or to buy some points and get special advantages. According to the different versions of the game, the restriction for free players varied. The International server, as the beta version, is completely free to play. In the Thai version free-play is restricted to outdoor maps; double option items and bike spawn locations are restricted; and less experience points are earned compared to premium players. The Japanese free-play version has no gameplay restrictions, but premium players earn double experience points and may purchase special items. The free-play in Korean and Global versions has limited experience point progression and has restricted map access (including the central location Perona.)

== Different versions ==
The Korean version (The Bloody Chronicles), being the original one, is by far the most advanced, with active GMs and regular events held. One has to be Korean to register. The game has four servers, one of which a non-PK server, that are accessible with the same character.

The North American server operated by Ignited Games has been open as of the end of 2011 and was closed by the end of 2013.. The game was relaunched on Steam on November 28, 2016.

On September 30, 2013, the Japanese server was shut down by Softon after 7 years of existence.

The first closed beta (Korea) of Darkeden 2 started in December 2014 and ended in June 2015.

== See also ==
- List of free massively multiplayer online games
