= Tony Thorne =

British linguist

Tony Thorne (born 1950 in Cairo, Egypt) is a British author, linguist and lexicographer specialising in slang, jargon and cultural history. He is a leading authority on language change and language usage in the UK and across the English-speaking world.

== Career ==
Thorne attended Hampton School and the University of Kent at Canterbury.

Thorne's Dictionary of Contemporary Slang, published by Bloomsbury in February 2014, remains one of the only treatments of the subject to be based on examples of authentic speech rather than purely upon written or broadcast sources, while Shoot the Puppy, a survey of the latest buzzwords and jargon, drew upon his inside experience of corporate life while working as a communications consultant for multinationals, NGOs and business schools. His 100 Words That Make the English, published by Abacus in April 2011, consists of essays on one hundred key words that are most emblematic of English identity in the 20th and 21st centuries.

After explorations in Central and Eastern Europe following the fall of communism and the opening of lost archives, Tony Thorne published the definitive English-language biography of the 16th century Hungarian Countess Erzsebet Bathory, reputed to be a mass murderer who bathed in the blood of her victims. His Children of the Night is a comprehensive account of the historical origins of the vampire myth as well as its subsequent representations in literature and popular culture. The book additionally examines contemporary vampire culture through interviews with self-styled ‘living vampires'.

Thorne has also written a life of the 18th century French waxworker, Madame Tussaud, for children, and writes on outsider and visionary art.

From 1991 to 2007 he was Director of the Language Centre at King's College London where he is now Visiting Consultant. He founded and oversees the Slang and New Language Archive at King's, a library and database resource recording language change and tracking linguistic controversies.

He has written and presented programmes on language and popular culture for BBC Radio 4 and the BBC World Service, and is a regular contributor to media discussions of language controversies, communication technologies and lifestyle innovations. He contributed the ‘Yoofspeak' column to the Times Educational Supplement and wrote the 'Bizword' column in British Airway's Business Life magazine. Thorne also acts as independent consultant and expert witness in legal proceedings involving copyright and branding disputes, and criminal proceedings involving the interpretation of slang and criminal language. Most recently he has compiled lexicons of language relating to Brexit and populism, recorded and commented on new language associated with the Coronavirus pandemic and new language used by GenZ and TikTokers. Most recently he has commented on the idiosyncrasies of AI's language use and their implications.

== Works ==
- Dictionary of Contemporary Slang, Bloomsbury, first published 1990; latest (4th) edition published 2014 ISBN 978-14081-8179-9
- Jolly Wicked, Actually: The 100 Words That Make Us English, Little, Brown Book Group, 2009 ISBN 1-4087-0089-1, published in a revised paperback edition entitled The 100 Words That Make the English, Abacus, 2011 ISBN 978-0-349-12103-1
- Shoot the Puppy, Penguin, London 2007 ISBN 0-14-102706-1
- Madame Tussaud, Short Books, London, 2004 ISBN 1-904095-29-1
- Children of the Night, Victor Gollancz, London, 1999 ISBN 0-575-06646-6
- Countess Dracula, Bloomsbury, London, 1997 ISBN 0-7475-2900-0
- Fads, Fashions & Cults, Bloomsbury, London 1993 ISBN 0-7475-1384-8

== Contributor ==
- Ed J Coleman, Global English Slang, Routledge, London, 2014 ISBN 978-0-415-84268-6
- Ed M Jazbec, European Perspectives Volume 3, Number 1, 2011 ISSN 1855-7694
- The Extraordinary Art of Laurie Lipton, beinArt Publishing, Brunswick, Victoria, 2010 ISBN 978-0-9803231-2-2
- Ed K Malmkjaer, Routledge Linguistics Encyclopedia, Routledge, London, 2009 ISBN 9780415421041
- (with Neil Murray) (eds) Multicultural Perspectives on English Language and Literature, Tallinn Pedagogical University/King's College London, Tallinn, London, 2004 ISBN 9985-58-336-1
- Malcolm McKesson, Matriarchy: Freedom in Bondage, Heck Editions, New York, 1996
