= Grabsteinland I =

Studio album by Untoten
- Released: October 20, 2003 (Germany)
- Genre: electronic music, Gothic rock, Darkwave
- Length: 46:27
- Label: Sonic Malade (Germany)
- Producer: David A. Line

Untoten chronology
Grabsteinland I (2003)	Grabsteinland II Herrschaft der Vampire (2004)

Grabsteinland I is the seventh album of Untoten.

== Track listing ==
1. "Wie kleine diese Welt... (Overtüre)"– 3:58
2. "Mit Den Augen Der Nacht"– 3:20
3. "Grabsteinland (Wach auf)"– 4:52
4. "Rabenlied (oder Die Legende von 300 Wölfen)"– 2:27
5. "Cynthia"– 4:31
6. "Du Hast mir ein Haus erbaut"– 3:11
7. "Alexanderplatz"– 4:46
8. "Siehst Du es denn nicht (ach du)"– 3:41
9. "NibelungenTreue"– 2:24
10. "Kristallwald"– 2:51
11. "Willst Du? (Remix)"-5:34
12. "Never"-3:46
13. "Land Im Nebel (reprise)"-1:50
14. "Land im Nebel (Outro)"-2:36

== Info ==
- All tracks written and produced by David A. Line
- Male vocals by David A. Line
- Female vocals by Greta Csatlós
