= Čachtice =

- Municipality
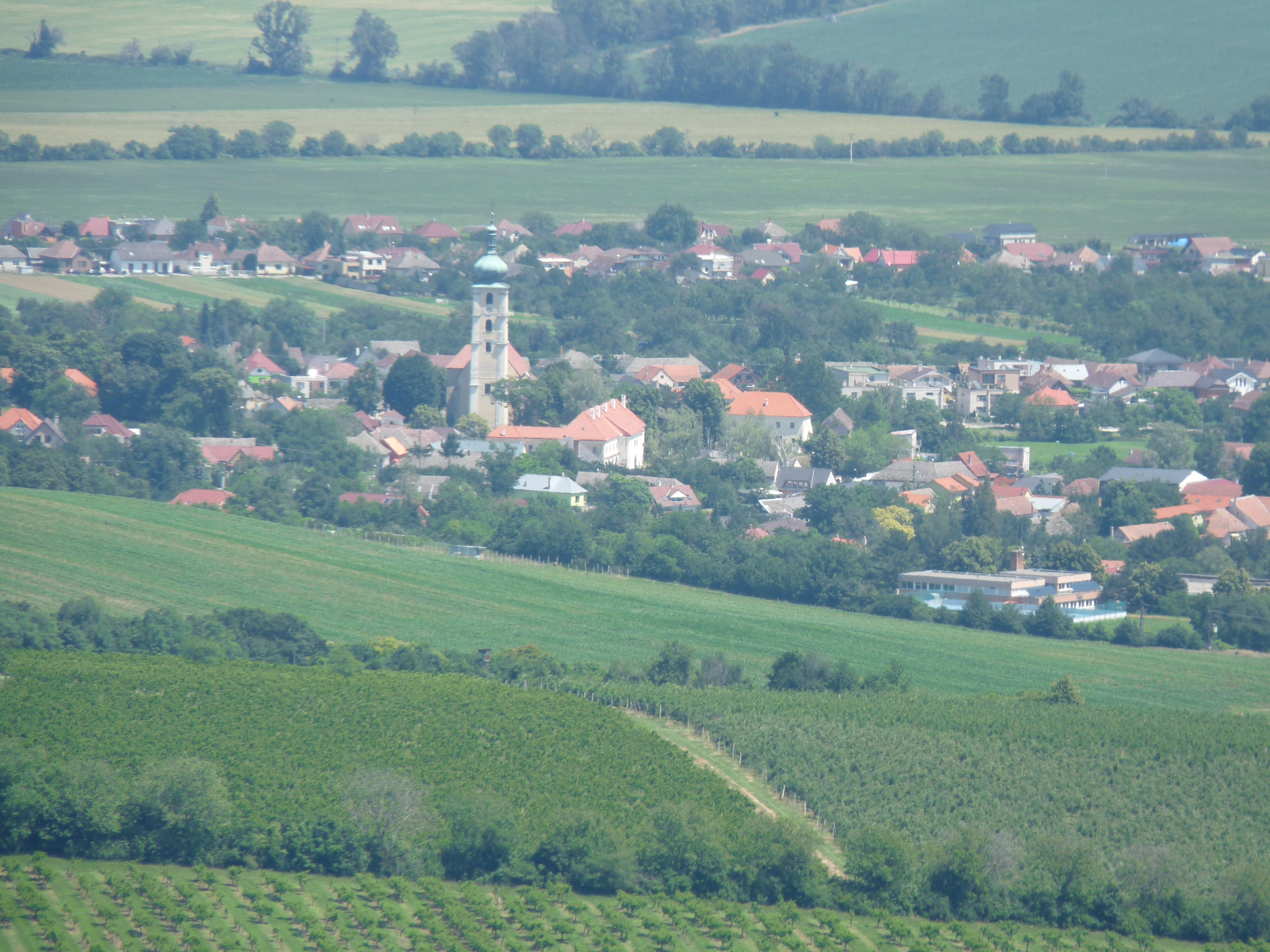

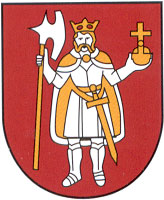
- Flag Coat of arms

- Location of Čachtice in the Trenčín Region Location of Čachtice in Slovakia
- Coordinates: 48.72°N 17.78°E
- Country: Slovakia
- Region: Trenčín Region
- District: Nové Mesto nad Váhom District
- First mentioned: 1263

Area
  - Total: 32.56 km^{2} (12.57 sq mi)
- Elevation: 182 m (597 ft)

Population (2025)
  - Total: 3,590
- Time zone: UTC+1 (CET)
  - Summer (DST): UTC+2 (CEST)
- Postal code: 916 21
- Area code: +421 32
- Vehicle registration plate (until 2022): NM
- Website: www.cachtice.sk

Čachtice (pronounced [ˈtʂaxcitse], Hungarian: Csejte, German: Schächtitz) is a village in Nové Mesto nad Váhom District in western Slovakia with a population of 4,010 (as of 2014).

The village is situated between the Danubian Lowland and the Little Carpathians. It is best known for the ruins of the nearby Čachtice Castle, home of Erzsébet Báthory. The castle stands on a hill featuring rare plants, and the area was declared a national nature reserve (Čachtický hradný vrch) for this reason.

== Geography ==
The municipality lies at an altitude of 182 metres (597 ft) and covers an area of 32.56 km^{2} (12.57 sq mi) (2025).

== History ==
Prehistoric settlements from the Neolithic, Chalcolithic, Bronze Age, Hallstatt period, La Tène period, Roman periods and the early Slavic period have been found here.

The first written reference to the village dates from 1263. Čachtice has received the status of a town in 1392, but it was later degraded back to a village. In 1847 the parsonage was the meeting place of the first Slovak national and cultural society Tatrín, at which the definitive decision to use the central Slovak dialects as the basis for the new standard of the codified Slovak language was adopted. Before the establishment of independent Czechoslovakia in 1918, Čachtice was part of Nyitra County within the Kingdom of Hungary. From 1939 to 1945, it was part of the Slovak Republic.

== Population ==
Population statistic (10 years)
Year	1995	2005	2015	2025
Count	3551	3640	4027	3590
Difference		+2.50%	+10.63%	−10.85%

Population statistic
Year	2024	2025
Count	3605	3590
Difference		−0.41%

It has a population of 3590 people (31 December 2025).

=== Ethnicity ===
Census 2021 (1+ %)
Ethnicity	Number	Fraction
Slovak	3473	93.78%
Not found out	206	5.56%
Total	3703	

In year 2021 was 3703 people by ethnicity 3473 as Slovak, 206 as Not found out, 18 as Czech, 11 as Romani, 8 as Other, 7 as Hungarian, 6 as Moravian, 5 as Russian, 4 as Ukrainian, 3 as Italian, 3 as English, 2 as German, 2 as Canadian, 1 as Jewish, 1 as Vietnamese, 1 as Serbian, 1 as Rusyn, 1 as Romanian and 1 as Austrian.

Note on population: The difference values of population numbers in the table "Population statistic" and in the sections "Ethnicity" & "Religion" is caused by the use of various statistical methods.

=== Religion ===
Census 2021 (1+ %)
Religion	Number	Fraction
Roman Catholic Church	2312	62.44%
None	915	24.71%
Not found out	227	6.13%
Evangelical Church	161	4.35%
Total	3703	

In year 2021 was 3703 people by religion 2312 from Roman Catholic Church, 915 from None, 227 from Not found out, 161 from Evangelical Church, 17 from Christian Congregations in Slovakia, 12 from Greek Catholic Church, 12 from Ad hoc movements, 7 from Other and not ascertained christian church, 6 from Calvinist Church, 6 from Jehovah's Witnesses, 6 from Other, 5 from Eastern Orthodox Church, 5 from Buddhism, 3 from Islam, 2 from Paganism and natural spirituality, 2 from United Methodist Church, 2 from Apostolic Church, 1 from Jewish community, 1 from Hinduism and 1 from Czechoslovak Hussite Church.

== Castle ==
The castle was built in the 13th century in order to protect a trade route to Moravia. The most famous owner was the Countess Erzsébet Báthory, who was imprisoned in her own castle and died there in 1614. The castle was abandoned in 1708 and now lies in ruins. Recently, the castle has undergone minor reconstructions.

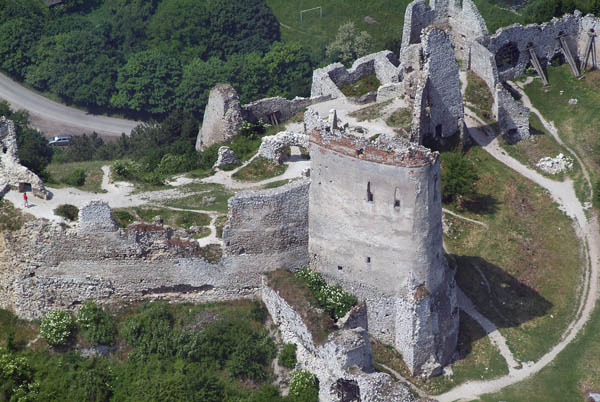
Čachtice Castle from the air

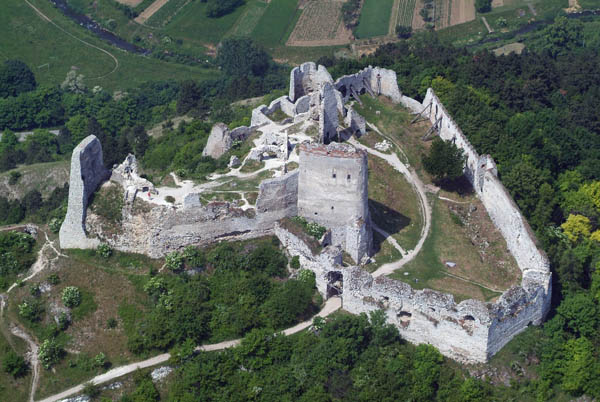
Čachtice Castle from the air

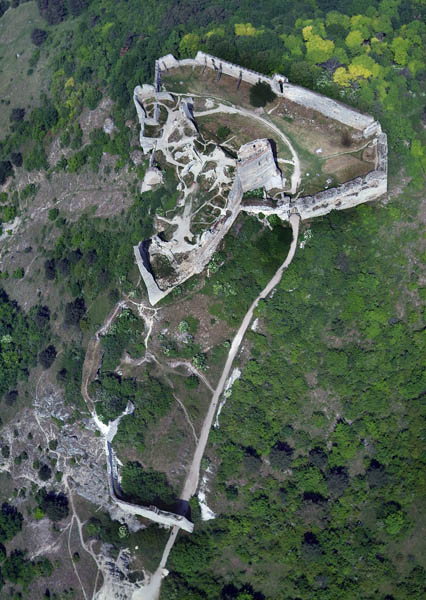
Čachtice Castle from the air

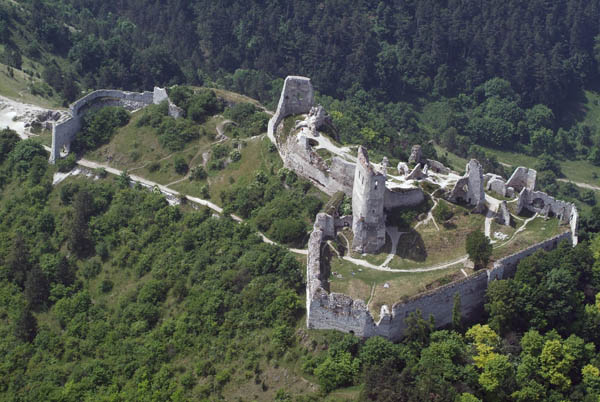
Čachtice Castle from the air

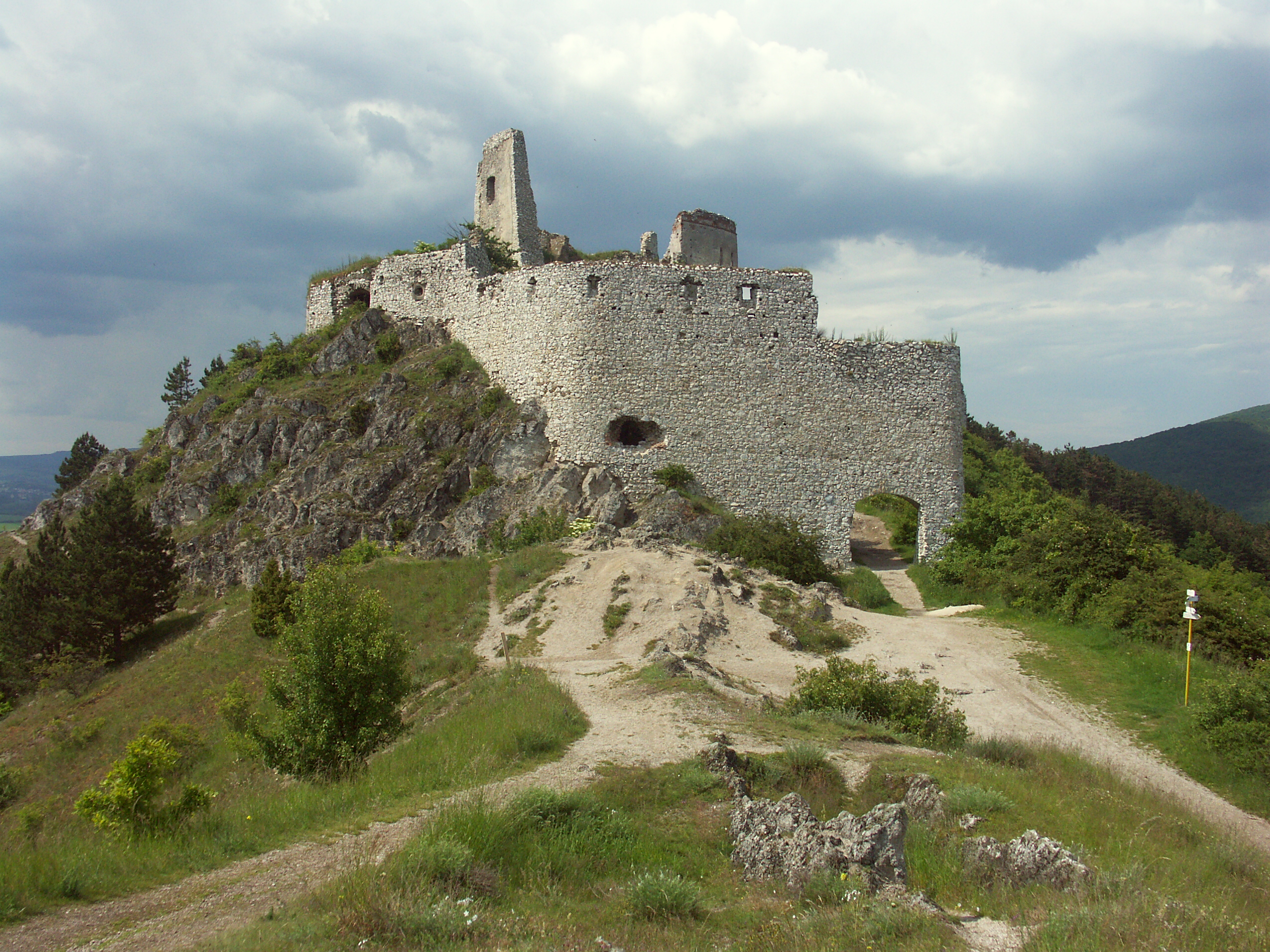
Čachtice Castle

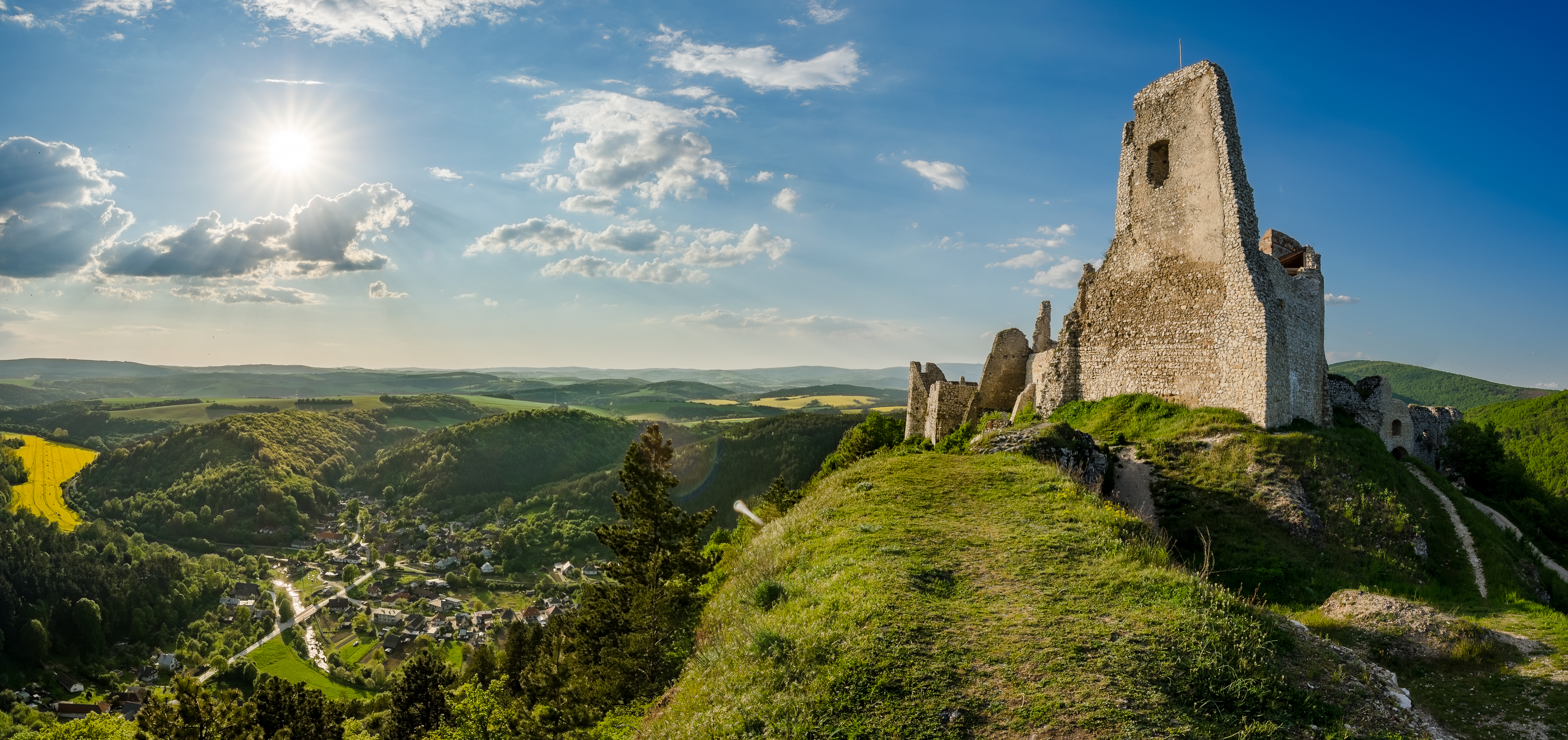
Čachtice Castle surviving tower

== Genealogical resources ==
The records for genealogical research are available at the state archive "Statny Archiv in Bratislava, Slovakia"

- Roman Catholic church records (births/marriages/deaths): 1661-1921 (parish A)
- Lutheran church records (births/marriages/deaths): 1783-1922 (parish B)

== Monuments ==
- Čachtice Castle
- Roman Catholic Church of St. Ladislava
- The Marian column
- The Calvary sculpture

== Transport ==
- Railway - the village lies on a branchline connecting it with Myjava, Trenčín and Vrbovce approximately 12 times daily.

== Notable people ==
- Erzsébet Báthory (c.1560–1614) Hungarian countess famous for her notorious cruelty
- Rudolf Strechaj (1914–1962) communist politician
- Jozef Balala (1915–1980) teacher and mathematician

== See also ==
- List of municipalities and towns in Slovakia
