= XIII. Století =

Czech rock band

XIII Stoleti
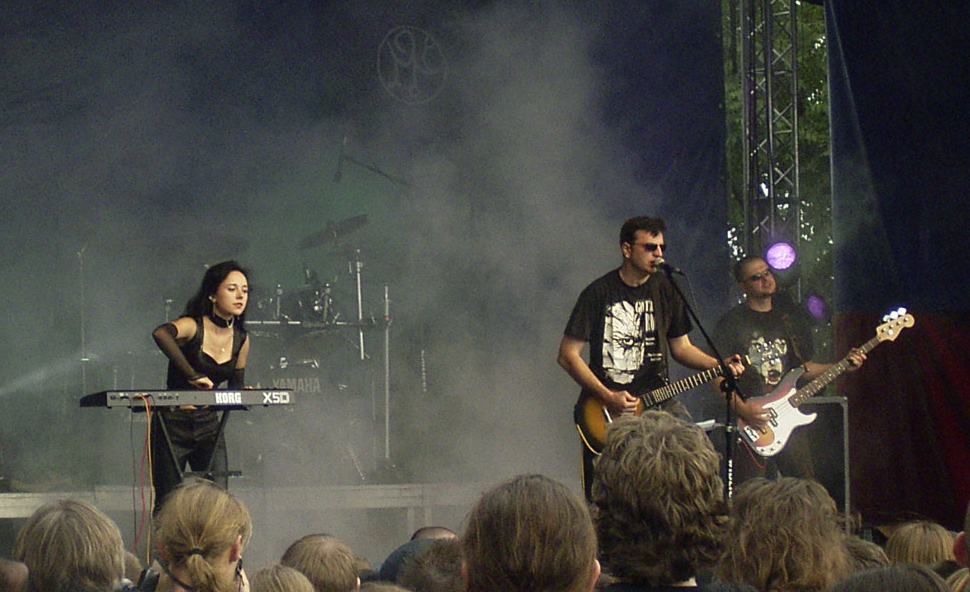
- XIII. Století at Castle Party

Background information
- Origin: Jihlava, Czech Republic
- Genres: Gothic rock; dark wave; hard rock; post-punk
- Years active: 1989–2004, 2008–present
- Labels: Happy Music
- Members: Petr Štěpán; Mirek "Palda" Paleček; Andrea Kožená; Pavel Štěpán
- Past members: Jana Havlová; Olie Ryšavá; Bedřich Musil; Martin Soukup; Jiří Šindelka; Marcel Novák; Michal Kourek; Petr Palovčík; Kateřina Kameníková

XIII. Století ('13th Century') is a Czech band from Jihlava playing gothic rock and hard rock. Initially, the band's style was post-punk, and the band's name was HNF - Hrdinové Nové Fronty ("Heroes of The New Front").

The band is mostly popular in Poland.

== Discography ==
- Amulet (1992)
- Gotika (1994)
- Nosferatu (1995)
- Werewolf (1996)
- Ztraceni v Karpatech (1998)
- Metropolis (2000)
- Karneval (2001)
- Vendetta (2004)
- Vampire Songs — Tajemství gotických archivů (2005) Compilation
- Dogma (2009)
- Nocturno (2010) Live
- Ritual (Compilation, 2011)
- Live in Berlin (2012) Live
- Horizont události (2013)
- Intacto (2016)
- Frankenstein (2019)
- Zahrada světel (2020)
- Amulet Live 2023 (2023)
- Noc Vlků (2024)
