= Čachtice Castle =

Castle ruin in Slovakia

- Castle of Csejte
- Čachtice, Slovakia
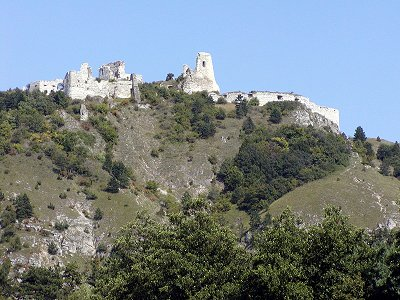
- View of the castle ruins from the south

Site information
- Owner: Village of Čachtice
- Condition: Ruined, Tourist Attraction
- Website: https://cachtickyhrad.eu/en/

Location
- Location in Slovakia
- Location within Slovakia
- Coordinates: 48.725°N 17.760833°E

Site history
- Built: 13th century
- Built by: Casimir Hont-Pázmány
- Materials: Limestone
- Demolished: 1799

Čachtice Castle or Castle of Csejte (Slovak pronunciation: [ˈt͡ʃaxcit͡se]; Slovak: Čachtický hrad, Hungarian: Csejte vára) is a castle ruin in Slovakia next to the village of Čachtice. It stands on a hill featuring rare plants, and has been declared a national nature reserve for this reason. The castle was a residence and later the prison of the Countess and alleged serial killer Elizabeth Báthory in the Kingdom of Hungary.

== History ==
Čachtice was built in the mid-13th century by Casimir from the Hont-Pázmány gens as a sentry on the road to Moravia. The castle was built in the era when several forts were erected in the Kingdom of Hungary following the Mongol invasion. Later, it belonged to Matthew Csák, the Stibor family, and then to Elizabeth Báthory. Čachtice, its surrounding lands and villages, was a wedding gift from the Nádasdy family upon Elizabeth's marriage to Ferenc Nádasdy in 1575.

Originally, Čachtice was a Romanesque castle with an interesting horseshoe-shaped residence tower. It was turned into a Gothic castle later and its size was increased in the 15th and 16th centuries. A Renaissance renovation followed in the 17th century. In 1708 the castle was captured by the rebels of Francis II Rákóczi. It was neglected and burned down in 1799. It was left to decay until it was turned into a tourist attraction in 2014.

== In film ==
Čachtice was used as the castle ruins set featured in the opening sequence of the 1996 fantasy movie Dragonheart by Universal Pictures starring Dennis Quaid. The 2008 film Bathory has driven some film tourism to the castle.

== Gallery ==
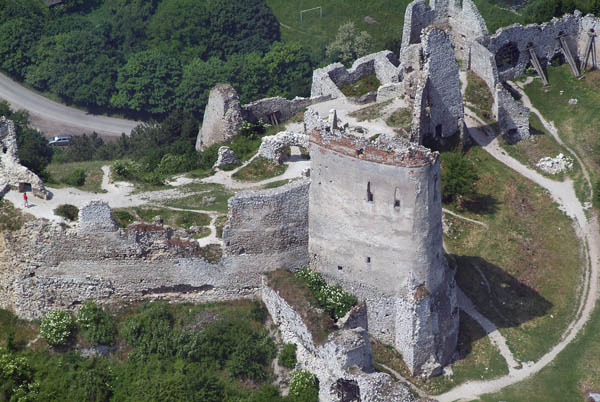

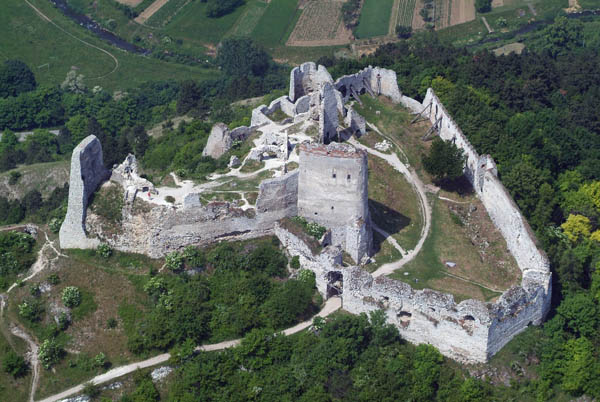

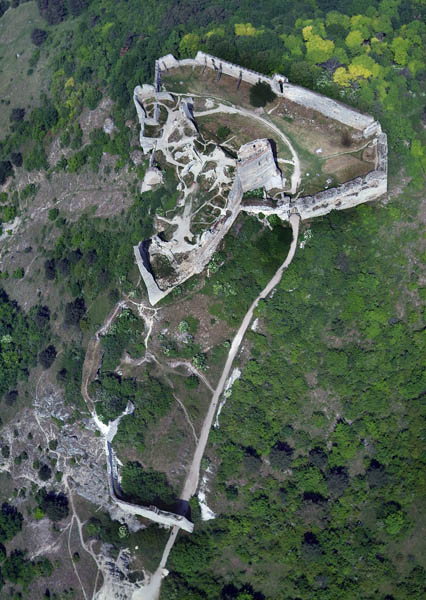

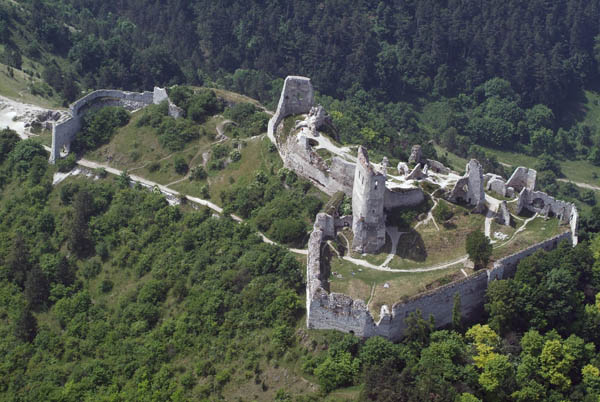

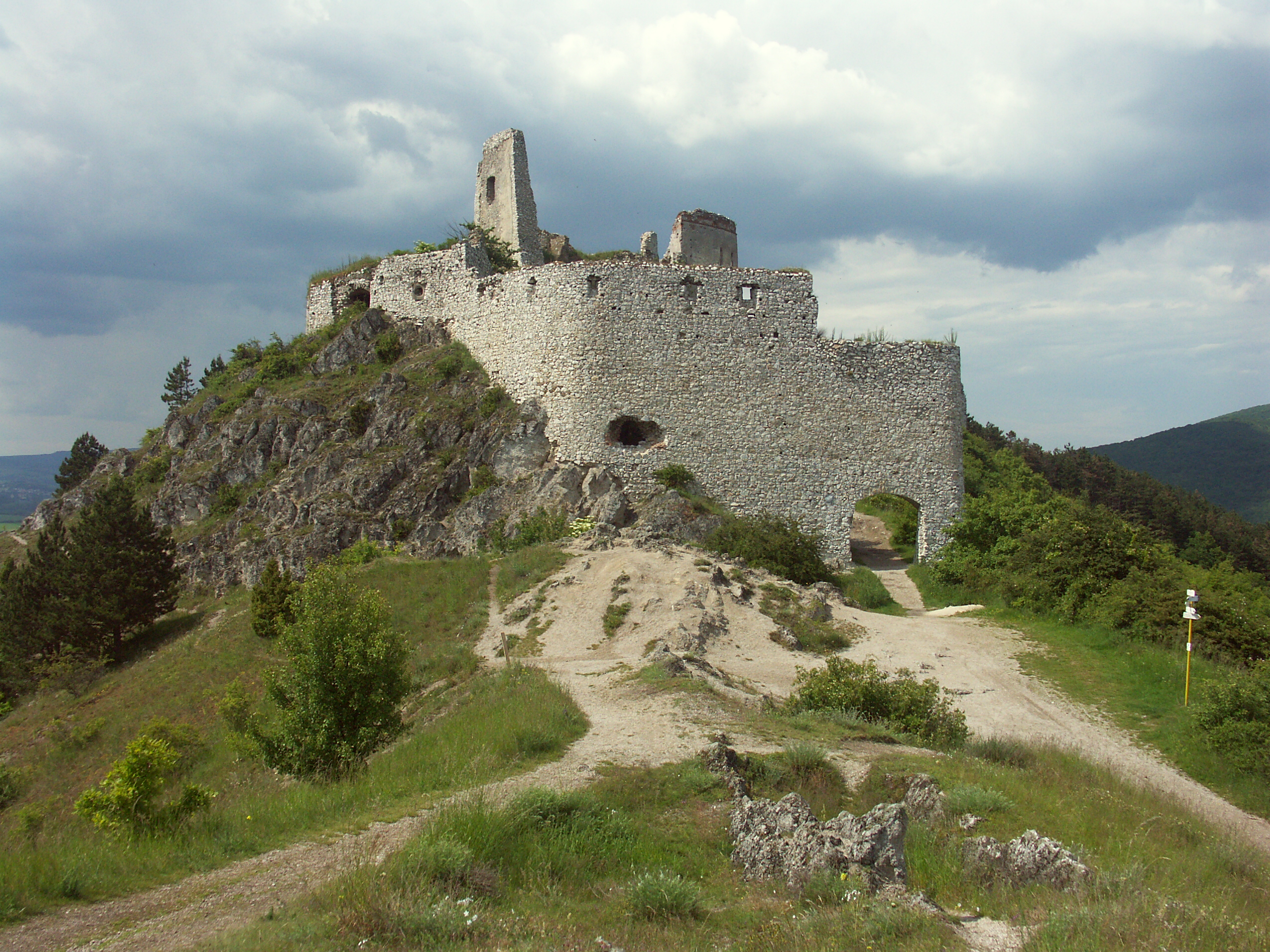

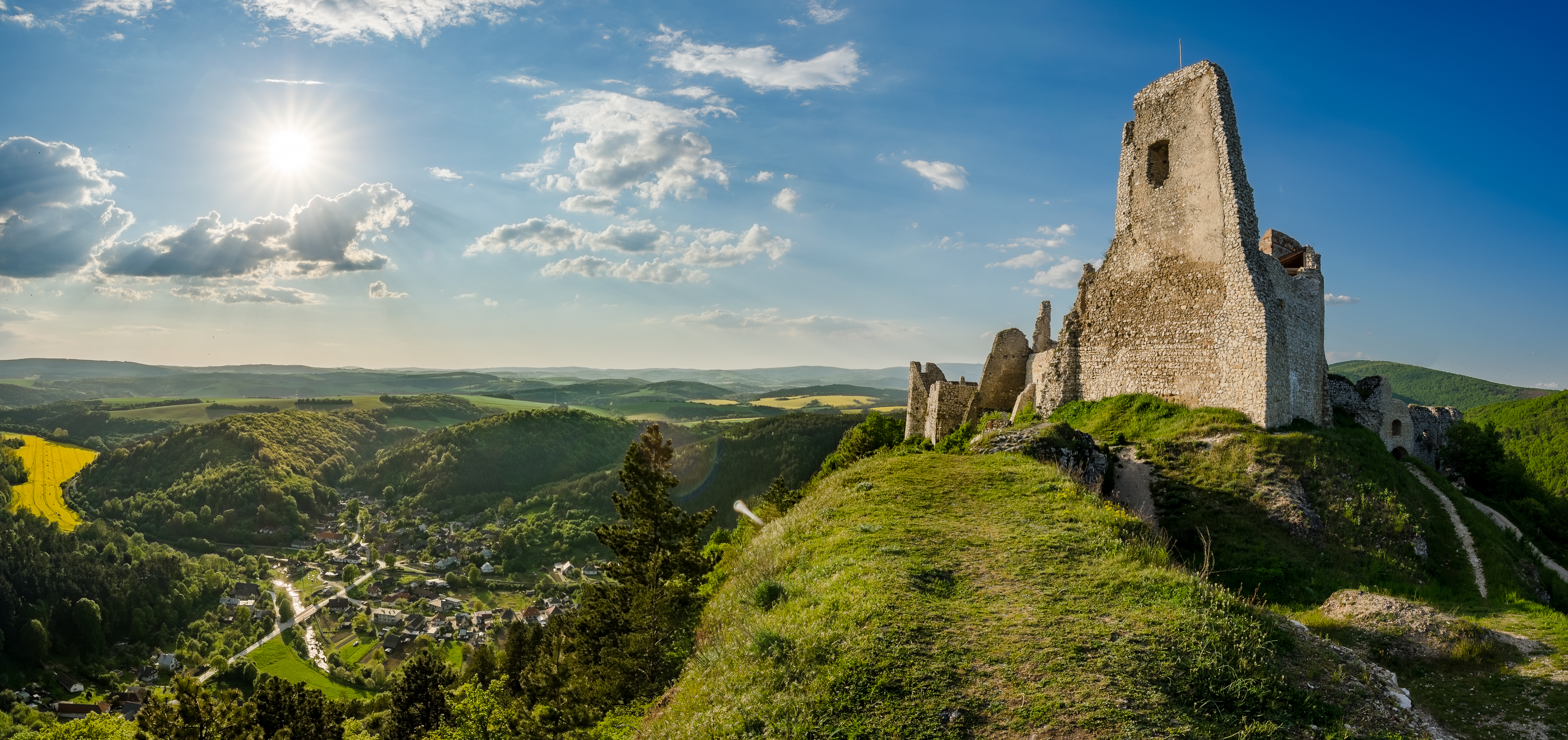
