= Elizabeth Báthory =

Hungarian countess and suspected serial killer (1560–1614)

Countess Elizabeth Báthory of Ecsed
- Erzsébet Báthory
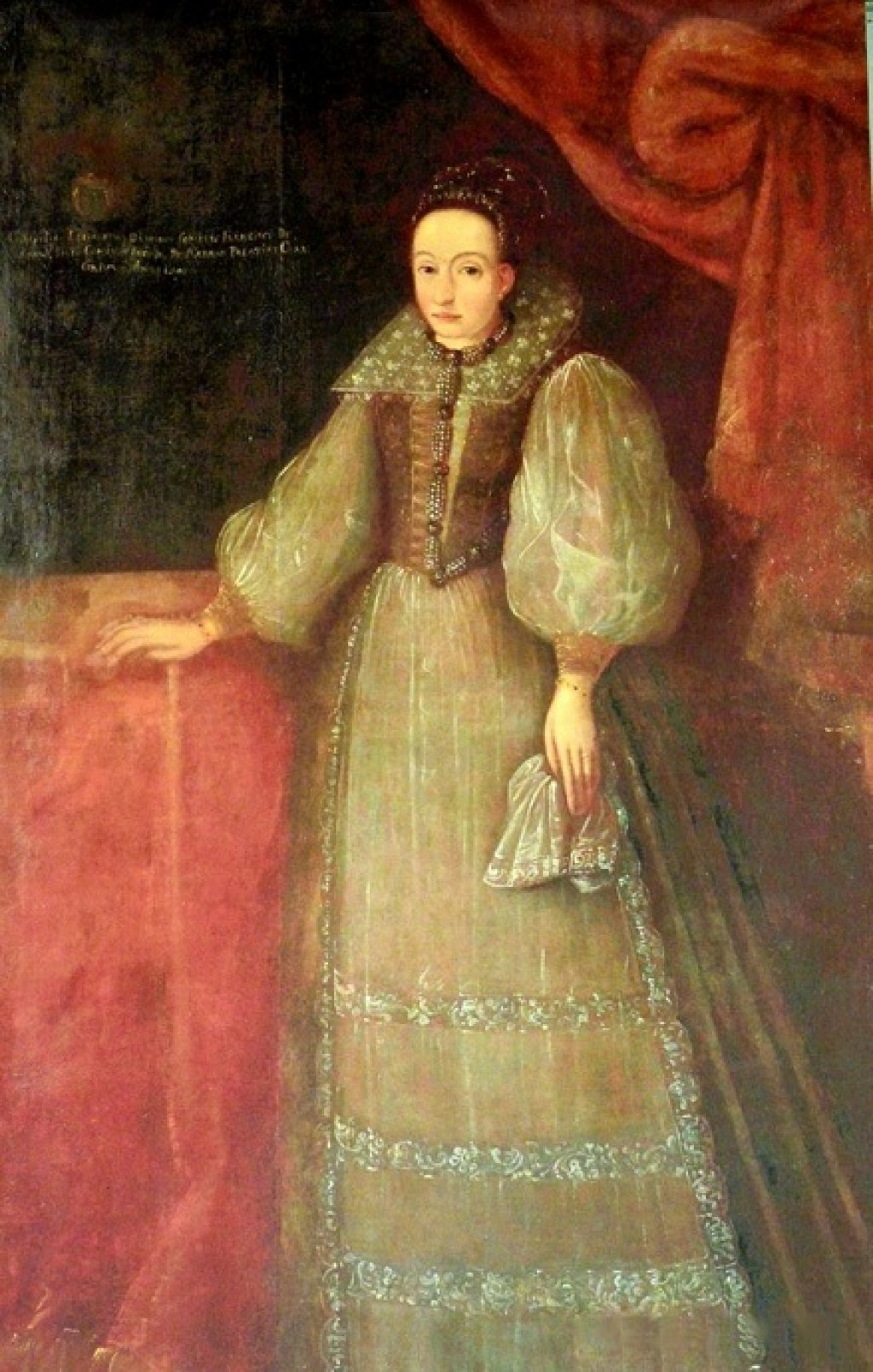
- 17th century portrait of Erzsébet Báthory located in the Hungarian National Museum in Budapest. Likely painted sometime between 1600–1650.
- Born: Báthory Erzsébet; 7 August 1560; Nyírbátor, Kingdom of Hungary
- Died: 21 August 1614 (aged 54); Csejte, Kingdom of Hungary (now Čachtice, Slovakia)
- Other name: Bloody Countess
- Known for: Hungarian noblewoman; subject of folklore; serial killer
- Spouse: Ferenc Nádasdy (m. 1575; died 1604)
- Children: Anna; Orsika; Katalin; András; Paul
- Relatives: Stephen Báthory, King of Poland (uncle); Stephen VII Báthory (paternal grandfather); Stephen VIII Báthory (maternal grandfather); Anna Radziwiłł (paternal great-grandmother); Andrew Báthory (cousin); Gabriel Báthory (cousin)
- Family: Báthory

Countess Elizabeth Báthory of Ecsed (Hungarian: Báthory Erzsébet, pronounced [ˈbaːtori ˈɛrʒeːbɛt]; Slovak: Alžbeta Bátoriová; 7 August 1560 – 21 August 1614) was a Hungarian noblewoman, aristocrat, and alleged serial killer from the powerful House of Báthory, which counted among its members several palatines of the Kingdom of Hungary, voivodes and princes of Transylvania within the lands of the Hungarian Crown, as well as a king of Poland. She was the wife of Hungarian nobleman and influential politician Count Ferenc Nádasdy of the House of Nádasdy. Báthory and four of her servants were accused of torturing and killing hundreds of girls and women from 1590 to 1610. Báthory and her cohorts were charged for 80 counts of murder and were convicted. Her servants were put on trial and executed, whereas Báthory was imprisoned within the Castle of Csejte, Hungary (now Čachtice, Slovakia) until she died in her sleep in 1614.

According to scholars such as Michael Farin, the accusations against Báthory were supported by testimony from more than 300 individuals, some of whom described physical evidence and the presence of mutilated dead, dying and imprisoned girls found at the time of her arrest. Other scholars suggest that the accusations were politically motivated spectacle to destroy her family's influence in the region, which was considered a threat to the political interests of her neighbours, including the Habsburg Monarchy.

Stories about Báthory quickly became part of national folklore. Legends describing her vampiric tendencies, such as the tale that she bathed in the blood of virgins to retain her youth, were based on rumours and only recorded as supposedly factual over a century after her death. Although these stories were repeated by at least three historians in the eighteenth and nineteenth centuries, they are considered unreliable by modern historians. Some insist that Elizabeth's story inspired Bram Stoker's novel Dracula (1897), although Stoker's notes on the novel provided no direct evidence to support this hypothesis. Nicknames and literary epithets attributed to her include Blood Countess and Countess Dracula.

== Biography ==
=== Early life and education ===
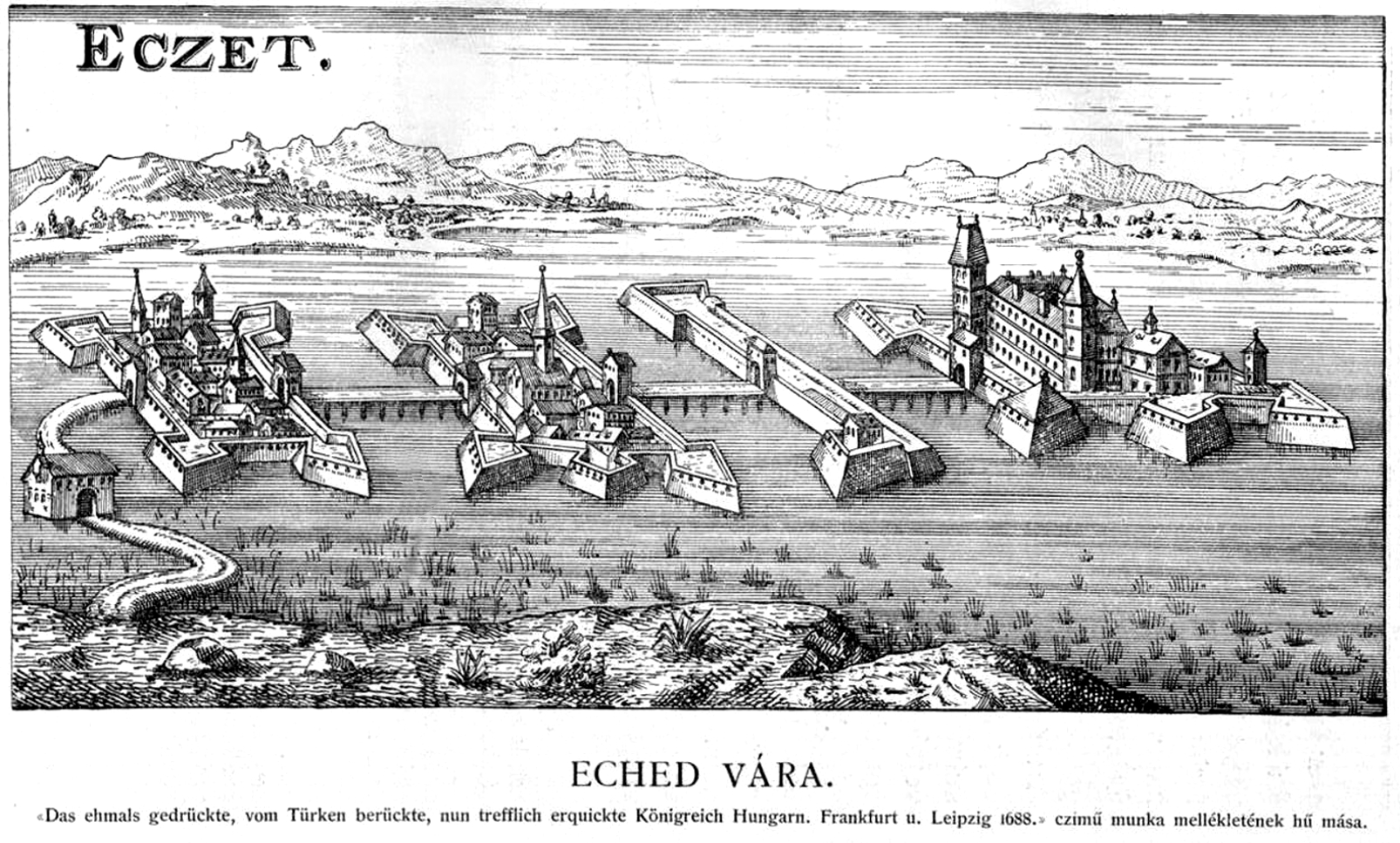
Ecsed (now Nagyecsed), the lake and the old castle

Elizabeth was born in 1560 on a family estate in Nyírbátor, Royal Hungary, and spent her childhood at Ecsed Castle. Her father was Baron George VI Báthory (d. 1570), of the Ecsed branch of the family and brother of Andrew Bonaventura Báthory (d. 1566), who ruled as Voivode of Transylvania. Her paternal great-grandparents were Anna Radziwiłł, a member of the influential Polish-Lithuanian Radziwiłł family, and Konrad III Rudy, Duke of Masovia and Warsaw, who was a member of the Piast dynasty. Her mother was Baroness Anna Báthory of Somlyó (1537–1570), a member of the other line of the Báthory family and the daughter of Stephen VIII Báthory of Somlyó, Palatine of Hungary. Through her mother, Elizabeth was the niece of Stephen Báthory (1533–1586), Prince of Transylvania, who became the ruler of the Polish–Lithuanian Commonwealth as King of Poland and Grand Duke of Lithuania. She had several siblings; her older brother Stephen (1555–1605) served as a judge royal of Hungary.

Báthory was raised a Calvinist Protestant, and she learned Latin, German, Hungarian, and Greek as a young woman. Born into a privileged noble family, she was endowed with wealth, education, and a prominent social rank. A proposal made by some sources to explain Báthory's cruelty later in her life is that she was trained by her family to be cruel.

As a child, Báthory had multiple seizures that may have been caused by epilepsy. At the time, symptoms relating to epilepsy were diagnosed as falling sickness, and treatments included rubbing the blood of a non-sufferer on the lips of one with epilepsy and giving the person with epilepsy a mix of a non-sufferer's blood and a piece of skull as their episode ended.

At the age of 13, before her first marriage, Báthory allegedly gave birth to a child. The child, said to have been fathered by a peasant boy, was supposedly given away to a local woman who was trusted by the Báthory family. The woman was paid for her actions, and the child was taken to Wallachia. Evidence of this pregnancy came up long after Elizabeth's death as rumours spread by peasants, leaving the veracity of said evidence questionable.

=== Marriage and land ownership ===
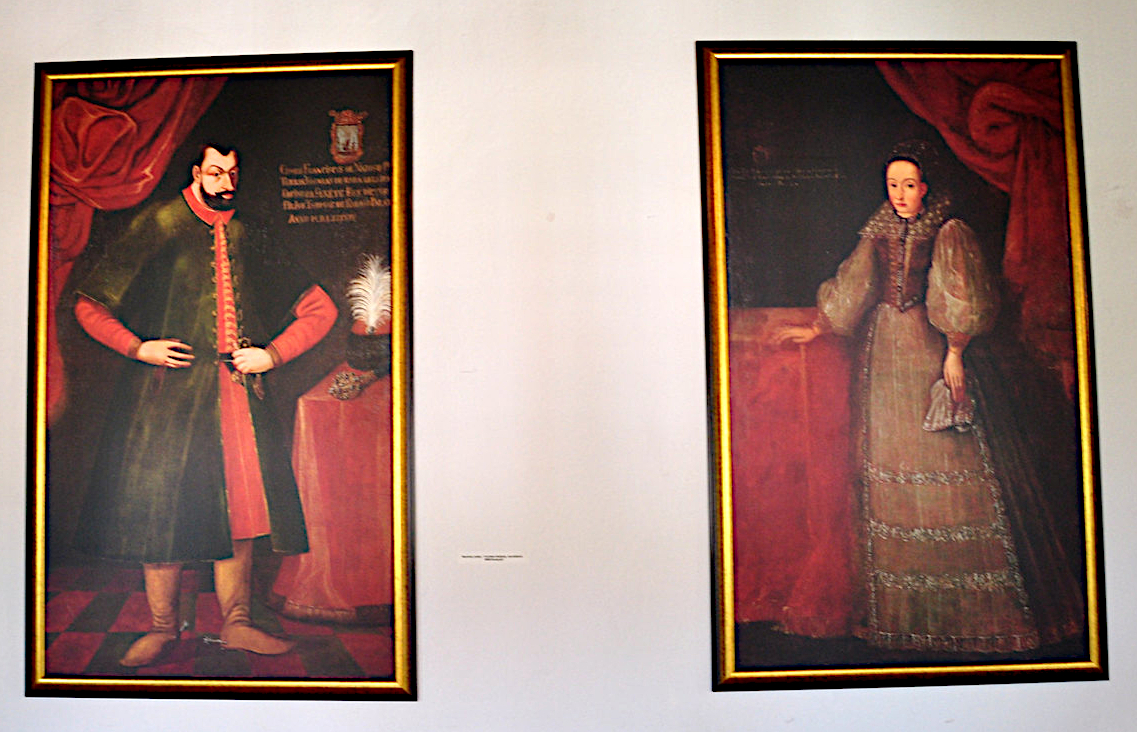
Portraits of Nádasdy and Báthory from the Čachtice Museum

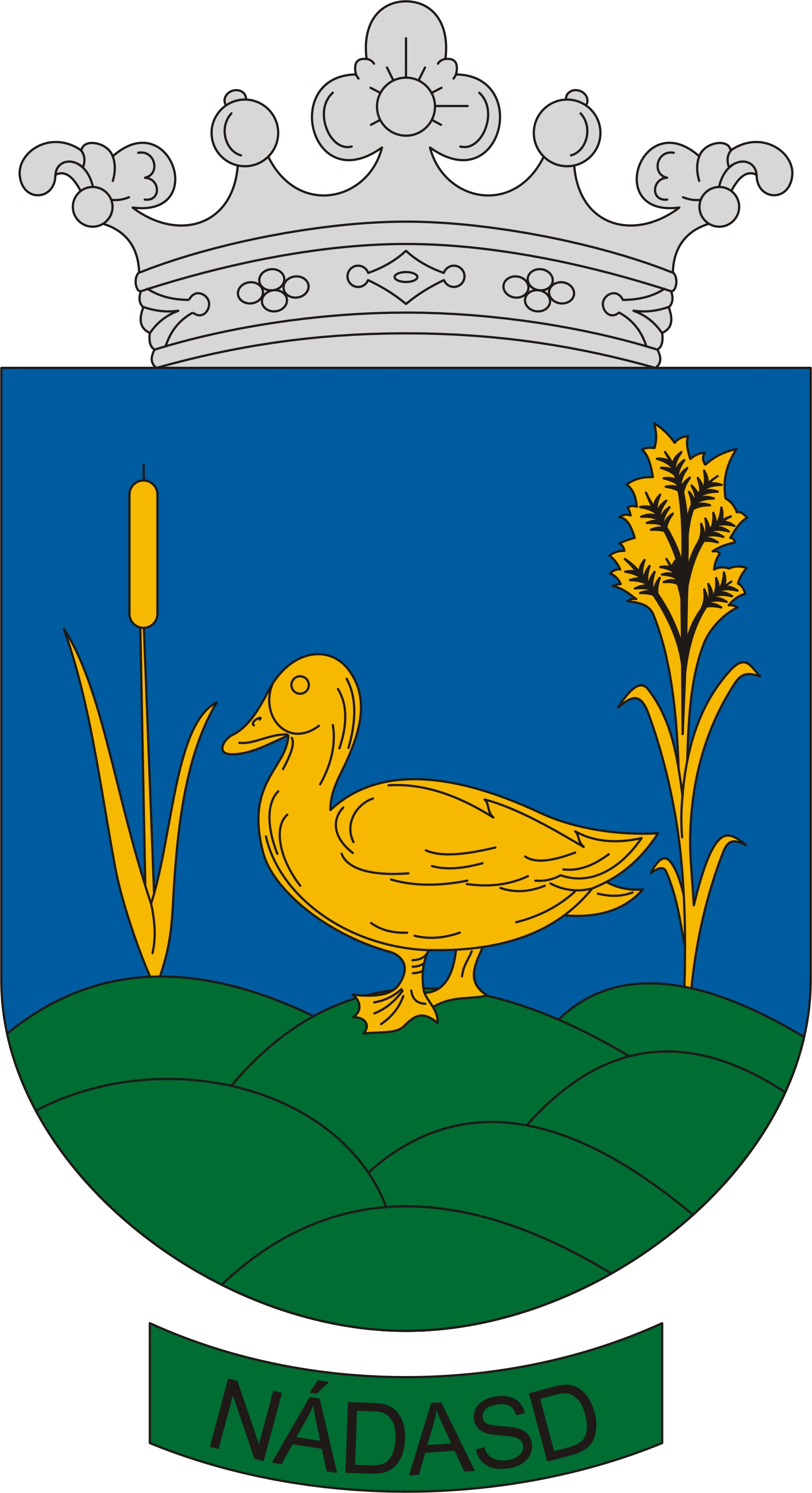
Coat of arms of the Nádasdy family

Coat of arms as of the Báthory family

In 1574, Báthory was engaged to Count Ferenc Nádasdy, a member of the Nádasdy family. It was a political marriage between the circles of the aristocracy. Nádasdy was the son of Baron Tamás Nádasdy de Nádasd et Fogarasföld (1498–1562) and his wife, Orsolya Kanizsai (1523–1571).

On 8 May 1575, Báthory and Nádasdy were married at the palace of Varannó (today Vranov nad Topľou, Slovakia). The marriage resulted in combined land ownership in both Transylvania and the Kingdom of Hungary.

Nádasdy's wedding gift to Báthory was his household in the Čachtice Castle (Castle of Csejte), situated in the Little Carpathians near Vág-Újhely and Trencsén (present-day Nové Mesto nad Váhom and Trenčín, Slovakia). At the time, Maximilian II, Holy Roman Emperor, owned the castle but made Ferenc's mother, Orsolya Kanizsai, the official steward in 1569. Nádasdy finally bought the castle in 1602 from Rudolf II, Holy Roman Emperor, but during his constant military campaigns, Elizabeth maintained the castle in his absence, along with the Csejte country house and seventeen adjacent villages.

After the wedding, the couple lived in Nádasdy's castle at Sárvár. In 1578, three years into their marriage, Nádasdy became the chief commander of Hungarian troops, leading them to war against the Ottomans. Báthory managed business affairs and the family's multiple estates during the war. This role usually included responsibility for the Hungarians and Slovaks, providing medical care during the Long Turkish War (1593–1606), and Báthory was charged with the defence of her husband's estates, which lay on the route to Vienna. The threat of attack was significant, as the village of Csejte had previously been plundered by the Ottomans, while Sárvár, near the border dividing Royal Hungary and Ottoman Hungary, was in even greater danger.

Báthory's daughter, Anna Nádasdy, was born in 1585 and was later to become the wife of Nikola VI Zrinski. Báthory's other known children include Orsolya (Orsika) Nádasdy (1590–unknown), who would later become the wife of István II Benyó; Katalin (Kata or Katherina) Nádasdy (1594–unknown); András Nádasdy (1596–1603); and Pál (Paul) Nádasdy (1598–1650), father of Franz III. Nádasdy, who was one of the leaders of the Magnate conspiracy against Leopold I, Holy Roman Emperor. Some chronicles also indicate that the couple had another son, Miklós Nádasdy, who married Zsuzsanna Zrinski, though those chronicles are not confirmed. He may have been a cousin or died young, for he is not named in Báthory's will from 1610. György Nádasdy is also supposedly the name of one of the deceased Nádasdy infants, but this cannot be confirmed. All of Elizabeth's children were cared for by governesses, as Báthory herself had been.

Ferenc Nádasdy died on 4 January 1604 at the age of 48. Although the exact nature of the illness that led to his death is unknown, it seems to have started in 1601 and initially caused debilitating pain in his legs. From then on, he never fully recovered and became permanently disabled in 1603. He had been married to Báthory for 29 years. Before dying, Nádasdy entrusted his heirs and widow to György Thurzó, who would eventually lead the investigation into Báthory's crimes.

=== Accusations ===
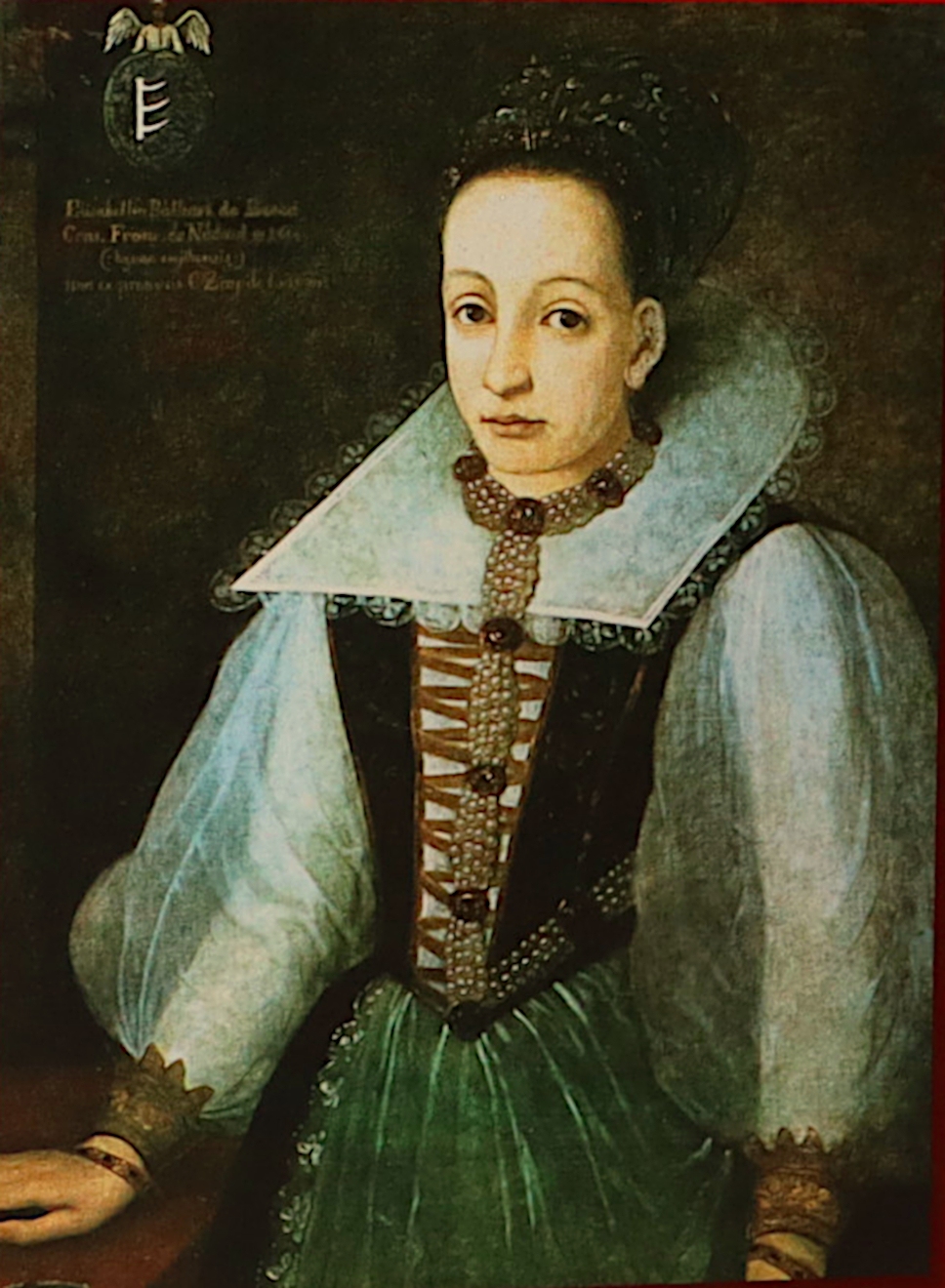
Elizabeth Báthory from Zay artist. Probably a copy of the other painting at the Hungarian National Museum in Budapest (also by Zay).

Between 1602 and 1604, after rumours of Báthory's atrocities had spread throughout the kingdom, Lutheran minister István Magyari made complaints against her, both publicly and at the court in Vienna. In 1610, King Matthias II of Hungary, assigned György Thurzó, the devoutly Lutheran Palatine of Hungary, to investigate. Thurzó ordered two notaries, András Keresztúry and Mózes Cziráky, to collect evidence in March 1610. By October 1610, they had collected 52 witness statements and by 1611, that number had risen to over 300.

Tamás Nyereghjárto was 35 years old when he was sworn in and interrogated in the town of Beckov. He stated that he saw a girl in Újhely who was being medically treated because the flesh on her right hand between the fingers and the arm was torn out and the tendon was destroyed. Janós Kunx (age 50 years) was the provisor of Franciscus Magochy in Beckov; his wife, Katalin (aged 36 years) testified that she had also seen this girl in Újhely. She testified similarly to her husband and Nyereghjárto, adding that the flesh between the victim's shoulders had been removed and that the right hand of the girl was "completely destroyed". Martinus Zamechnyk (aged 50 years) testified that he had asked this girl from Újhely, "Who did that to your hand?" The girl replied: "The Lady Widow Nádasdy had done it", referring to Báthory. His testimony was taken by András of Keresztúr and published on 28 July 1611 on the orders of King Matthias II.

According to one of her accomplices, Dorottya Szentes, Báthory would stick needles into the fingers of some of her victims. After she did this, Báthory would comment: "If it hurts the whore, then she can pull it out". However, Szentes added that if the girl removed the needle, Báthory would then cut off the finger with a knife.

During the trial, many atrocities were said to have occurred in many of Báthory's castles. These atrocities usually included severe beatings with cudgels, needles inserted into lips, arms, shoulders, and fingernails, and flesh cut out from the buttocks and between the shoulders, which was then roasted. Many victims were locked in the castle's dungeons and starved for weeks. Red-hot pokers and irons were used to scorch the arms and abdomen of the victims, knives plunged into arms and feet, fingers cut off with scissors and shears, and girls made to stand naked in the winter cold and then doused with water till they froze to death.

Critically, a handful of individuals provided first-hand accounts of Báthory's crimes at the trial. Three of these individuals included Jakab Szivássy, Gergely Paztory, and Benedek Deseö. Deseö was the head of "The Lord's staff" at Castle Csejte and was responsible for operations at the castle. Since Deseö and Szivássy were around Báthory the most, they gave the most detailed confessions of what they witnessed during their time of service at Castle Csejte. These three men were not tortured into confessions, unlike Báthory's accomplices (Ilona, Janós, Dorottya, etc.). After Deseö was sworn in, he testified that Báthory "took a shoemaker's daughter named 'Illonka', stripped her naked and began to cruelly torment her by taking a knife, and beginning with the fingers, shoved the knife into both arms up the arms, then flogging her over again, then took a burning candle to her and burned her skin, and continued to torment her until she put an end to her life". He also testified that Báthory would "stick a sewing needle in her victims arms and use it to cut her way up the arm of a girl who could not sew." Deseö also testified that Báthory would withhold food and water from her victims until they became very thirsty.

Gergely Paztory was a court judge at Castle Sárvár for Elizabeth Báthory and was forty years old when he was sworn in and testified. He testified that a "young woman from Bratislava named Modl accompanied Báthory and Paztory on a trip to Fuzer". He continued, "The Lady Báthory forced her to dress up and act like a young girl, Modl pleaded for forgiveness as she could not act like a young girl since she is already married and has a child". Following this, in Jakab Szivássy's testimony, Jakab added that the "young woman called Modl, since she did not want to be a girl, Báthory had cut out her flesh and roasted it". After this incident, she continued to torment Modl until she was killed at Sárvár. These testimonies were collected by Mózes Cziráky and were published on 14 December 1611, in his report on the orders of King Matthias II.

Nobleman Martinus Chanady, who lived in Beckov, was 48 years old when he was sworn in and interrogated. He testified that he and Janós Belanczky had visited the Lady Widow Nádasdy in Beckov so that Janós could get his sister back from Báthory. Báthory had refused to give Janós' sister back when they asked. Janós then demanded that he at least see her; after waiting for nearly an hour, Janós' sister finally appeared but was severely weakened because of the great pain from torture and torment, so much so that she could barely hold out her hands and was bitterly crying and whining. After this, it was said that Janós' sister died and was buried in Beckov. Martinus also claimed that he knew Báthory had killed the daughters of a nobleman named Georgius Tukynzky and another nobleman named Benedictus Barbel. Martinus also claimed that he heard how Báthory had torn the flesh of virgins, ground it into minced meat, and allowed it to be served before them. This testimony was collected by András of Keresztúr and was published on 28 July 1611, on the orders of King Matthias II.

Báthory is said to have tortured or killed peasants for years; their disappearances were not likely to provoke an investigation. However, she eventually began killing daughters of the lesser gentry, some of whom were sent to live with her hoping to learn from her and benefit from a connection to the high-ranking countess.

Some witnesses named relatives who died while at the gynaeceum. Others reported having seen traces of torture on dead bodies, some of which were buried in graveyards, and others in unmarked locations.

==== Veracity of accusations ====
Beginning in the 1980s, scholars have questioned the truthfulness of the claims against Báthory. Several authors, such as László Nagy and Irma Szádeczky-Kardoss, have argued that Elizabeth Báthory was a victim of a politically motivated frameup. Nagy argued that the proceedings against Báthory were largely politically motivated, possibly due to her extensive wealth and ownership of large areas of land in Hungary, which increased after the death of her husband. At that time, Hungary was embroiled in religious and political conflicts, especially relating to the wars with the Ottoman Empire, the spread of Protestantism, and the extension of Habsburg power and political centralization at the expense of the military and political power of Austria and Hungary's noble houses. The Habsburgs were Catholic and Báthory was a Calvinist. Her nephew, Prince Gábor Báthory, ruled in Transylvania, which was influential in the movement for Ottoman-backed Hungarian independence from Habsburg rule, providing the Imperial Court in Vienna a further motivation to discredit the Báthory family. Prince Gábor also desired the throne of Hungary, presenting a threat to King Matthias. Elizabeth Báthory's vast land holdings included fortresses that could have aided the Transylvanian army if Gábor had sent it to challenge Matthias. Matthias, who had originally ordered the investigation into Báthory, owed her a large financial debt, which was cancelled after she was arrested.

The legalities of the trial were complicated. King Matthias believed that if Erzsébet received the death penalty, her property would cede to the Crown and his debts would be cancelled. By January 1611 he was angered that the death penalty was not being discussed against Báthory, based on the proceedings brought by his two notaries to gather testimonies, Mózes Cziráky and András of Keresztúr. On 14 January 1611, King Matthias wrote a letter to Count György Thurzó expressing his dissatisfaction with the movement of the case, and the need for justice to be brought to Báthory, and for her to be interrogated at Castle Csejte. The letter said:

We instruct you earnestly and we give you the emergency order as soon as your receive this letter, that you immediately summon this woman Erzsébet Báthory on the said date or through dates of letters to your bondsmen and by warrant of the honorable Chapter of the Metropolitan Church of Esztergom to appear at Castle Csejte with leave to discover and discuss her aforementioned immense and outrageous deeds and that the judgement proceed and be carried out in fulfillment of the law, whether she appears personally or sends someone or not, and warn at the front where you set the date and place she personally or by legal representation appear before you. Your handling of the matter, however, given the insistence of the parties involved, has to be done in accordance with the law. Anything else shall not proceed.

This letter explains how King Matthias and Thurzó were not on the same page regarding how to proceed with Báthory after her arrest. On the contrary, Báthory's son-in-law Miklós Zrínyi had thanked Thurzó in a letter that he wrote to Thurzó, dated 12 February 1611, regarding how Thurzó was treating his mother-in-law post-arrest. An excerpt from this letter states:

I heard the news of the shameful and miserable situation of my wife's mother, Mrs. Nádasdy [Elizabeth Báthory] in view of her immense, shameful deeds, I must confess that, regarding a penalty, you have chosen the lesser of two evils. The judgement of your Grace served us for the better, because it has preserved our honor and shielded us from too great a shame. When, in your letters, you made known to us the will of His Royal Majesty (King Matthias), including punishment by horrible, judicial torture, we, her relatives, felt that we must all die of shame and disgrace.

This letter demonstrates that Thurzó did not want to disgrace the Báthory name, and wanted to keep her crimes as far away from the public eye as possible.

The investigation into Báthory's crimes, however, was sparked by insistent complaints from a Lutheran minister, István Magyari, and Thurzó was also a Lutheran, which does not align with the notion of a Catholic/Habsburg plot against the Protestant Báthory family. However, religious tension was still a possible source of conflict, as the Báthorys were Calvinists rather than Lutherans.

Thurzó, the investigator into the accusations, had political state ambitions that would benefit from disgracing Báthory. An ally of King Matthias, he had been involved in an assassination attempt on Báthory's cousin Prince Gábor, and he had ambitions for his son to become Prince of Transylvania, in competition with Elizabeth Báthory's son. Thurzó alleged that he found numerous dead and dying girls when he entered the castle, but Szádeczky-Kardoss argues that the physical evidence was exaggerated and Thurzó misrepresented dead and wounded patients as victims of Báthory. Landowners like Báthory were responsible for medical care of tenants, so sick and injured subjects were brought to her castles. Female landowners were charged with care of female patients.

Despite this, a handful of people provided firsthand accounts of Báthory's crimes at the trial. One of these people was Janós Deseö, who was warden (castellan) of Castle Keresztúr. He testified that his niece, named Kata Berényi, had been accepted to work at the Countess' court; however it was alleged, through rumors, that his niece was being mistreated by Báthory. He wanted to see if these rumors were true, so after learning that his niece, Kata, would accompany Báthory on an extended trip to Castle Csejte, he planned to intercept the party to see his niece before they left. After Deseö intercepted the entourage, he asked Báthory, "Might I please see my niece before you take your leave?" "I hear you are going to take her along to Csejte, and no one knows when I am going to see her again. I also want to give her some money." After spotting his niece, Kata, he realized she was dejected, crying, and freezing cold, which brought Deseö to tears as well. Deseö then said to Báthory: "Merciful Lady, please do not take my niece with you! I implore you in the name of God, not by me but by all my relatives". He continued: "We indeed see that she does not know how to serve the will of Your Grace." At this point, Báthory then said: "I certainly will not give her back, because she has already escaped from me three times, All the more I will kill her." After this incident, Deseö stated that: "Báthory indeed took her away and never brought her back, tormenting her so much that she died."

Another witness was Lady Barbara Bixi, who was residing at Castle Keresztúr and was twenty-five years old when she was sworn in and interrogated. She stated that she was an attendant of the mistress Báthory and had been travelling with her for the last four months, during which she was being interrogated. She testified that Lady Báthory had tormented numerous girls at Bitcá, and that she had seen these girls with her own eyes. She added that Báthory had: "Beaten and thrashed them, cut their bodies, stabbed the unfortunates with needles, put stinging nettles into the girls' wounds or covered them with nettles, as to torment them". She testified that "she does not know the names of all the girls, because, in general, the girls were grabbed from anywhere and brought there." Janós Újvaly (Ficzkó) corroborated this sentiment by stating that typically they would lure or outright kidnap girls from different places and bring them to the many different castles. Mózes Cziráky collected both Lady Barbara's and Janós Deseö's statements and published them on 14 December 1611, on the orders of King Matthias II. These confessions were not done under torture.

=== Arrest ===
On 13 December 1610, Nikola VI Zrinski confirmed the agreement with Thurzó about the imprisonment of Báthory and distribution of the estate. On New Year's Eve 1610, Thurzó went to Csejte Castle and arrested Báthory along with four of her servants, who were accused of being her accomplices: Dorottya Szentes, Ilona Jó, Katarína Benická and János Újváry ("Ibis" or Ficzkó). According to Thurzó's letter to his wife, his unannounced visit found one dead girl and another living "prey" girl in the castle, but there is no evidence that they asked her what had happened to her. She recovered but did not testify in the trials. Although it is commonly believed that Báthory was caught in the act of torture, she was having dinner. Initially, Thurzó made the declaration to Báthory's guests and villagers that he had caught her red-handed. However, she was arrested and detained prior to the discovery or presentation of the victims. It seems most likely that the claim of Thurzó's discovering Báthory covered in blood has been the embellishment of fictionalised accounts.

On the night of the raid, Elizabeth Báthory was taken into custody along with her four accomplices. Elizabeth had accused two reverends and one pastor of the reason for her arrest, after a long conversation where Báthory attempted to blame her accomplices for the dead bodies being found. She added this statement after Pastor Barosius had asked her why she did not stop her accomplices from committing the tortures and murders. She said, "I did it ... Because even I myself was afraid of them". This statement was confessed by Báthory herself and was not extracted under torture.

Thurzó debated further proceedings with Báthory's son Paul and two of her sons-in-law, Nikola VI Zrinski and György Drugeth. Her family, which ruled Transylvania, sought to avoid the loss of Báthory's property, which was at risk of being seized by the crown following a public scandal. Thurzó, along with Paul and her two sons-in-law, originally planned for Báthory to be sent to a nunnery, but as accounts of her actions spread, they decided to keep her under strict house arrest.

Two trials followed Báthory's arrest: the first on 2 January 1611 and the second on 7 January 1611. In the first trial, seventeen witnesses testified, including the four servants who were also fellow suspects. These suspects had been tortured before the proceedings. They confessed and stated that they were acting on Elizabeth's orders. After the trial, they were executed as her accomplices. Ilona Jó and Dorottya Szentes had their fingers torn out with a pair of red-hot pincers and were then burned alive. Due to his youth and the belief that he was less culpable, János Újváry was executed by a much less painful method: beheading. Afterwards, his body was burned on the same pyre as Jó and Szentes. Another servant, Erzsi Majorova, initially escaped capture but was burned alive after being apprehended. Katarína Benická received a life sentence after evidence showed that she had been abused by the others.

The highest number of victims cited during the trial of Báthory's accomplices was 650, but this figure comes from a servant named Susannah, who claimed that Jakab Szilvássy, Báthory's court official, had seen it in one of Báthory's private books. The book was never revealed and Szilvássy never mentioned it in his testimony.

It is very difficult to know with any certainty how many young women Báthory is said to have killed. This is due to many compounding factors: firstly, her accomplices (Dorka, Ficzkó, and Ilona) all gave different numbers and were tortured into confessions. Secondly, one should assume that not every dead body was found, as in most serial killer cases. Lastly, how many of the girls died directly at the hands of Báthory, as a result of her tortures, or died for other reasons, is hard to prove. With this in mind, a couple of people who testified at the trial could offer some insight. Benedek Bicsérdy was the castellan at Báthory's castle at Sárvár. In October 1610, in the preliminary investigation of the Countess, he stated that he knew of at least 175 girls and women who had died at Castle Sárvár. However, he added that he knew nothing regarding how they died because "unless Báthory had called for him, he was not permitted to go into the house of the Lady." Another witness was named Baltazar Poby (also spelled Balthasar Poky); he was another castellan at Castle Sárvár. He testified that he had heard the number of victims at Castle Sárvár, actually numbered over 200, "if not already mounting to nearly 300".

These numbers only take into account the bodies found at one of Báthory's castles (in Sárvár). It does not include her other castles, including Castle Keresztúr and the infamous Castle Csejte.

=== Confinement and death ===
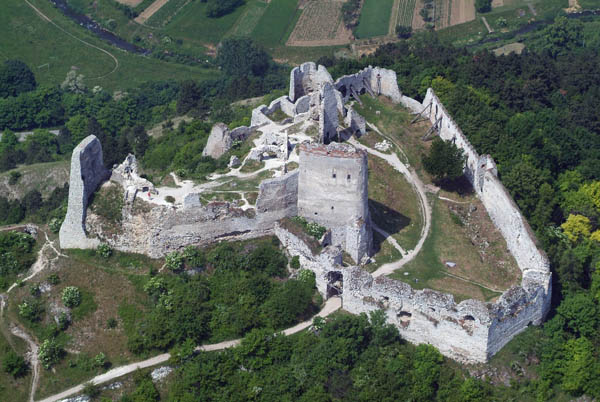
Aerial view of Castle of Csejte

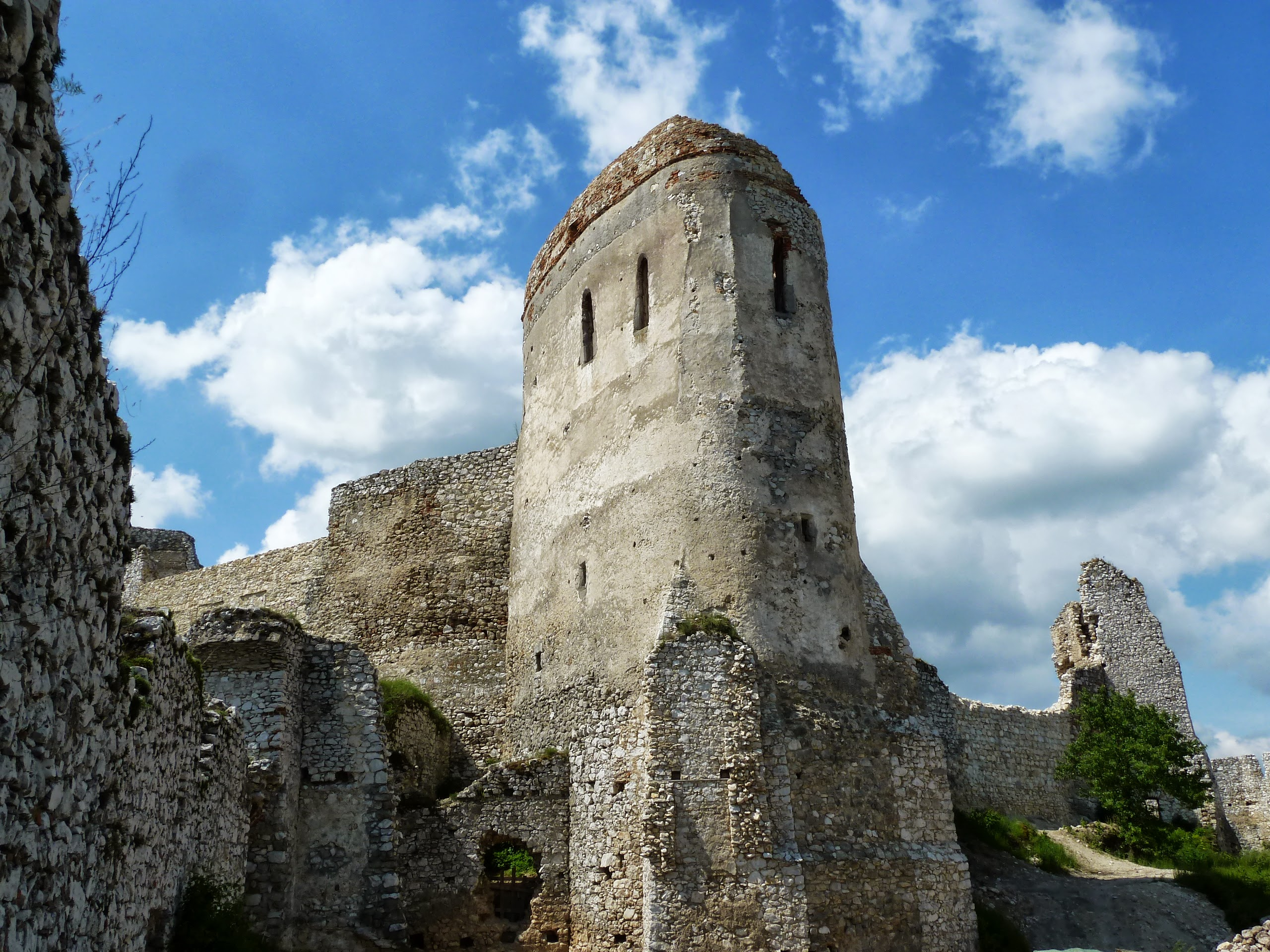
Remains of the castle's chapel

On 25 January 1611, Thurzó wrote a letter to King Matthias describing that they had captured and confined Báthory to her castle. The palatine also coordinated the steps of the investigation with the political struggle with the Prince of Transylvania. She was detained in the castle of Csejte for the remainder of her life, where she died at the age of 54. György Thurzó wrote that Báthory was locked in a bricked room, but according to documents from the visit of priests in July 1614, she was able to move unhindered in the castle, more akin to house arrest.

She wrote a will in September 1610, in which she left all current and future inheritance possessions to her children. In the last month of 1610, she signed her arrangement, in which she distributed the estates, lands, and possessions among her children. On the evening of 20 August 1614, Báthory complained to her bodyguard that her hands were cold, whereupon he replied, "It's nothing, mistress. Just go lie down". She went to sleep and was found dead the following morning. She was buried in the church of Csejte on 25 November 1614, but according to some sources, due to the villagers' uproar over having the Countess buried in their cemetery, her body was moved to her birth-home at Ecsed, where it was interred at the Báthory family crypt. The location of her body today is unknown.

== The Gynaecaeum ==
In the Winter of 1609, Báthory opened a Gynaecaeum, similar to a finishing school, for highborn young women. The Gynaecaeum brought in much-needed funding and provided a new type of victim for Báthory to kill after many peasant families in the local villages surrounding her castles declined to let their daughters work at the castles after the reputation of Báthory had spread throughout the Kingdom. On the contrary, many noble families were eager to send their daughters to her court, so their social status would increase, and they could learn courtly etiquette. However, once their daughters did not come back home, they eventually appealed to King Matthias for answers.

Noblewoman Anna Zelesthey, who resided in the town of Milhalifalva, was 54 years old when she was sworn in and interrogated. Zelesthey testified that her own daughter named Zsuzska was accepted to attend Lady Báthory's court. However, she testified that she could say with certainty, and also from what others had told her, that her daughter was tortured, tormented, and beaten so badly that she was killed in the Gynaecaeum. She also testified that it was Lady Báthory who beat, tortured, and tormented her daughter to death based on what she was told by others. This testimony was collected by Mózes Cziráky and was published on 14 December 1611, on the orders of King Matthias.

A noblewoman named Anna Köszeghy was 32 years old when she was sworn in and interrogated. She testified that she would make numerous trips to Báthory's Gynaecaeum and saw many of the victims in a tortured state. She testified that their fingers were broken and hands were scorched. She testified that when she asked these girls about their hands being burned, they told her that Báthory had burned them with red-hot irons. Another Noblewoman named Dorottya Jezernyczky was 45 years old when she was sworn in and interrogated. She testified that she sent her own daughter named Erzsébet to this Gynaecaeum, and that she was killed in the Gynaecaeum. These testimonies were published on 28 July 1611, by András of Keresztúr on the orders of King Matthias.

The Castellan of Castle of Csejte (Čachtice), Michael Horvath, stated that he knew of at least seven girls who had died at the Gynaecaeum. He stated that these seven bodies had been buried in a little garden behind the courtyard in Castle Csejte, but they had not been buried deep enough, so dogs had dug up the corpses and were carrying around body parts in their mouths.

It was alleged that in a matter of weeks, all of the attendants in her Gynaecaeum had been killed. When Nobles began to press Báthory on why their daughters had gone missing, Báthory concocted this story that one of the girls in her Gynaecaeum had gone crazy and killed all of the other attendants and then killed herself. She alleged that this girl did this because she was greedy for jewelry.

During this time, dozens of complaints from the Hungarian nobles began to flood the King's and Palatine's courts, accusing Báthory of torturing and murdering noble girls. This time the King could not ignore the complaints and sent his two notaries (Mózes Cziráky and András of Keresztúr) and Gyorgy Thurzó to investigate the claims.

It was also said that during this time one of Báthory's victims actually managed to escape from Csejte and went into the nearby village and alerted the locals about the goings-on at Csejte. It was also said that this girl had a knife stuck in her foot.

== Letters about Erzśebet and the Trial proceedings ==
There are many letters that were sent between Thurzó, The King, Báthory's own children, and the two notaries before and after Elizabeth was arrested. These letters describe the trial proceedings and the findings through testimonies. Some of these include:

Thurzó's letter to Mozes Cziráky, dated 5 March 1610. "To the honorable Master, Mózes Cziráky, our Deputy Notary, with gracious greetings. You know how, both in the past and the present time, several serious complaints have come to us regarding the noble and glorious Lady Erzsébet Báthory, the widow of the late, noble and glorious Lord Ferenc Nádasdy, etc.; namely, that this same Lady Erzsébet Báthory, through some sort of evil spirit, has set aside her reverence for God and man, and has killed in cruel and various ways many girls and virgins and other women who lived in her Gynaecaeum; also that we, both by the will of said Royal Majesty and by virtue of the laws and regulations of the Kingdom of Hungary, said Palatine of the same Kingdom of Hungary shall be responsible in fulfilling our duties and we are entitled under Palatinal authority, in accordance with the customs of the Kingdom, to punish said unbearable and serious crimes which have been committed. Thus, we can legitimately and duly proceed in the aforementioned matter; and, thus, regarding said Lady Erzsébet Báthory, once a proper verdict – if it should be necessary – is spoken and can be achieved, we begin by ordering you in this matter to collect and make inquiries of witnesses, as the law of the Kingdom requires. Therefore, we exhort you earnestly and instruct and authorize you, by virtue of our Palatinal authority that, as soon as you receive this letter, to question every member of both the ecclesiastical state as well as the nobility and other honorable people of all classes and of both sexes in the counties of Györ, Sopron, Vas, Zala and Veszprém, concerning the above-mentioned killings of girls and women by the said Lady Erzsébet Báthory; by members of the spiritual state, may they answer in the purity of their conscience; by the upper and lower nobility, and those of other classes of both sexes, out of respectable secular ethos in their God, and with due reverence and loyalty to the said Royal Majesty and the sacred Crown; the whole, pure truth is to be fully explored, and you should bring your experience to the inquiry (we add our Palatinal authority by virtue of the seriousness of the matter and strictly impose a penalty of 16 marks – such as this is available in a general decree – a heavy weight imposed immediately thereafter upon those whom it affects, as we are adamant that only the pure truth be given on the issue points without having the slightest sacrifice of the oath). After implementation of these interviews and witness interrogations, you are obliged to faithfully report and to make announcements to us. This matter calls for justice. Anything else shall not proceed. Given at Bratislava, on the 5th day of the month of March, the year of the Lord 1610."

King Matthias letter to Thurzo dated 14 January 1611. "Venerable and distinguished one, loyal subject sincerely devoted to us. What you tell us about the lofty and well-known Widow Nádasdy in writing, we have not heard without serious displeasure, paralyzing fear and internal shuddering; namely, that she has put behind any reverence for God and man, driven by animal crudity and diabolical influence, killing more than 300 innocent virgins and women, of both noble and lower levels, who served her as maids, and of whom no such action was deserved, without any involvement of the judiciary, in a most monstrous and cruel manner, their bodies mutilated, burned with hot irons, their flesh ripped out, roasted on the fire and this roasted flesh then allowed to be served. We would have certainly preferred that mortals never heard of such an atrocity of so many miserable virgins who perished, whose innocent blood and misery could not be held by the vastness of the heavens; but after this became so widely known and, as a result, the fear that if we do not render punishment the avenging wrath of God will come upon us, we are determined to bring justice and, by this example to cut off other such outrageous acts of sacrilege, that the woman known as Lady Erzsébet Báthory (after the others had already been caught in the act, convicted and arrested by you), 15 days from when this copy was created or the date on which your decision to the court against the notable Peter Zokoli falls, under the law and in accordance with the custom of the Kingdom and, finally, on the basis of the matter there being no grounds in which to delay a verdict for her outrageous sacrilege and deeds, and through our faithful one, the excellent Magister Joannes Kythonich of Kostanicza, the President of the Court Chamber (director causarum nostrarum regalium) of the Crown of the Holy Kingdom of Hungary, to our knowledge will do as follows: we instruct you earnestly and we give you the emergency order as soon as you receive this letter, that you immediately summon this woman Erzsébet Báthory on the said date or through dates of letters to your bondsmen and by warrant of the honorable Chapter of the Metropolitan Church of Esztergom to appear at Castle Csejteh with leave to discover and discuss her aforementioned immense and outrageous deeds and that the judgment proceed and be carried out in fulfillment of the law, whether she appears personally or sends someone or not, and warn at the front where you set the date and place that she personally or by legal representation appear before you. Your handling of the matter, however, given the insistence of the parties involved, has to be done in accordance with the law. Anything else shall not proceed. Given in our City of Vienna on the 14th day of the month of January in the year of the lord, 1611."

Pal Nadasdy's letter to Thurzo dated 23 February 1611 "I wish Your Grace and my Lady, as well as your beloved children, all the best from God, as you yourself desire. I took from your letter what His Majesty has ordered you to do to my miserable mother. I have your response to His Majesty, and realize how often you are well disposed toward me and my sisters. God grant that we, I and my sisters and brothers-in-law, can reward your kindness by obedience from a pure heart throughout our entire lives. It is true, as you wrote to His Majesty, that the Citatio (court summons) should have been issued sooner and that it is now inappropriate, because Your Grace, as the country's Chief Justice, has already done enough extentio. It is no longer necessary to continue, since the present punishment of my poor mother is worse than death, and not necessary to proceed according to the command of His Majesty since a judgment on her life has already been made. Turning now to her property, there is no need to fear, because before her arrest, she turned it all over to the three of us. Nevertheless, we, the relatives and humble subjects of His Majesty, wish to ask that your use of legal force against my mother not impose eternal shame on our family. However, we do not want to act without the knowledge and advice of Your Grace; it is not fitting. I therefore implore you, please, write to us your opinion on how my sisters and I should proceed with our intercession to His Majesty so as not to cause Your Grace any grief; indeed, as we learned from your letter, which we have kept secret. I await a favorable response from you, as my beloved father and Lord. God grant you many years in good health. Castle Keresztúr, February 23, 1611."

(Pal Nádasdy is Elizabeth's son)

== Folklore and popular culture ==
The case of Elizabeth Báthory inspired numerous stories during the 18th and 19th centuries. The most common motif of these works was that of the countess bathing in her virgin victims' blood to retain beauty or youth. This legend appeared in print for the first time in 1729, in the Jesuit scholar László Turóczi's Tragica Historia, the first written account of the Báthory case. The story came into question in 1817 when the witness accounts (which had surfaced in 1765) were published for the first time. They included no references to blood baths. In his book Hungary and Transylvania, published in 1850, John Paget describes the supposed origins of Báthory's blood-bathing, although his tale seems to be a fictionalised recitation of oral history from the area. It is difficult to know how accurate his account of events is. Sadistic pleasure is considered a far more plausible motive for Báthory's crimes.

== See also ==
- Elizabeth Branch
- Elizabeth Brownrigg
- Kateřina of Komárov
- Delphine LaLaurie
- Catalina de los Ríos y Lisperguer
- Darya Nikolayevna Saltykova
- List of serial killers by country

== Bibliography ==
- Craft, Kimberly (2009). Infamous Lady: The True Story of Countess Erzsébet Báthory. Kimberly L. Craft. ISBN 978-1-4495-1344-3.
  - Craft, Kimberly L. (2014). Infamous Lady: The True Story of Countess Erzsébet Báthory (2nd ed.). Amazon. ISBN 978-1502581464.
- Kürti, László (30 June 2009). "The symbolic construction of the monstrous–the Elizabeth Bathory story". Narodna umjetnost-Hrvatski časopis za etnologiju i folkloristiku. 46 (1): 133–159.
- McNally, Raymond T. (1983). Dracula Was a Woman: In Search of the Blood Countess of Transylvania. New York: McGraw Hill. ISBN 978-0-07-045671-6. Raymond T. McNally (1931–2002) was a professor of Russian and East European History at Boston College
- Penrose, Valentine (2006). The Bloody Countess: Atrocities of Erzsébet Báthory. translator: Trocchi, Alexander. Solar Books. ISBN 978-0-9714578-2-9. Translation from the French Erzsébet Báthory la Comtesse sanglante
- Puhak, Shelley, (2026). The Blood Countess : Murder, Betrayal, and the Making of a Monster, Bloomsbury.
- Ramsland, Katherine. "Lady of Blood: Countess Bathory". Crime Library. Turner Entertainment Networks Inc. Archived from the original on 11 March 2014.
- Thorne, Tony (1997). Countess Dracula. Bloomsbury. ISBN 978-0-7475-2900-2.
- Wilde, Robert. "Elizabeth Báthory: Mass Murderer or Victim?" (ThoughtCo, 28 Feb. 2019) online
- Zsuffa, Joseph (2015). Countess of the Moon. Griffin Press. ISBN 978-0-9828813-8-5.
