= Atmosfear: Khufu the Mummy =

2006 board game

- Designers: Brett Clements; Phillip Tanner
- Publishers: Flying Bark Productions
- Publication: 2006
- Genres: Horror and terror
- Players: 3–6
- Setup time: 1–2 minutes
- Playing time: up to 45 minutes
- Skills: Dice rolling, reading, strategy

Atmosfear: Khufu the Mummy is a video board game released in 2006 by A Couple 'A Cowboys and Flying Bark Productions as the last DVD game of the Atmosfear series. The company previously teased a Khufu-themed expansion of Nightmare at the end of Nightmare IV, though declining sales prevented it from occurring.

A direct sequel to Atmosfear: The Gatekeeper, the game is set in a place known as "Khufu's", which is the titular character's casino-pyramid in Egypt (in the backstory, Khufu managed to beat the Gatekeeper at his own game and win his freedom, along with that of his fellow Harbingers). As such, there are many changes to the traditional Atmosfear gameplay. The characters again are the Harbingers, but this time, they are joined by a new member of the crew. To play the game, each player adopts the persona of one of the Harbingers: Anne de Chantraine the witch; Baron Samedi the zombie; Elizabeth Bathory the vampire; Gevaudan the werewolf; Helin the poltergeist, and newcomer Medusa the gorgon.

== Gameplay ==
Before the game starts, it is suggested that the volume be turned up to create the perfect "Atmosfear", owing to the DVD's 5.1 Surround soundtrack. Then after setting up the board that represents Khufu's pyramid and game elements, the players choose which character to use during gameplay as well as choosing one of six symbols as their lucky symbol throughout the game; the symbols are divided into two suits - Animals (Cat, Falcon and Jackal) and Royals (Ankh, Eye of Horus and King). Once "Play" is chosen from the main menu, Khufu will be summoned. When he asks who is playing, the players use the DVD remote to tell him which characters are in the game; at least 3 players are required. Khufu will then choose "Lucky", his servant, to perform tasks on his behalf. Lucky rolls first to start the game and the 45-minute time limit (represented on-screen by an hourglass, replaced by a timer when there are five minutes left). Pressing Stop or Pause on the remote is not possible afterwards.

The aim is to win the game before 45 minutes expires as stated above. To do this, players must collect Treasures (the game's form of currency), lay down four plastic scarabs by beating the tables inside the four Chambers on the board, then head to the Chamber with Khufu's Sarcophagus to play Khufu's Ultimate Challenge. The player who wins the challenge will win the game, though if no-one succeeds in beating Khufu before 45 minutes have elapsed, then Khufu is declared the winner.

Starting from inside the Servant's Chamber, the players take turns to roll one numbered die and move in a clockwise direction around the board. Whenever Khufu appears on-screen, all players must stop and follow his instructions (e.g. whenever Khufu asks "Who is the mummy?", all players must reply with "You are the mummy!"); if a player is in the middle of a turn when he appears, they must end their turn. If a player lands on a "Treasure" space (a dollar sign picture on the board), they must take a Treasure card from the deck and also keep any Treasures in their possession face down, to conceal them from opponents. In some instances, Khufu will play a game which involves betting Treasure; if a player doesn't have Treasure when they are called upon for such a game, they cannot play and their turn passes clockwise to the next player on their left who does have Treasure. If a player lands on or is sent to a "Curse" space (a snake), they must take a Curse card and follow the instructions, then return the card to the bottom of the deck. If a player lands on a "Steal" space (a person carrying bags and wearing a robber's mask), they can try to steal a Treasure card from an opponent, as long as the stealer has Treasure of their own. But if the Treasure they steal is protected by a cobra, they must give the card back and give that player one of their own Treasures as a penalty.

The objective is to play and win a table to place a scarab of the player's color inside each of the 4 Chambers in the game. While an exact roll is not needed to enter a Chamber, entry requires Treasure. Each Chamber can be entered as many times as the player likes and features a game of chance with a minimum wager, with players only allowed to enter if they have enough Treasures in their hand. Players cannot pass through a Chamber and move on to another in the same move, nor can they turn around inside a Chamber to move back onto the track. Once inside, players must stop and then lay a bet to try their luck at the table in that Chamber:

- The Servant's Chamber: In the Servant's Chamber, the minimum wager is 1 Treasure. One of the numbered dice is thrown. To beat the table, the player must roll an odd number.
- The High-Priest's Chamber: In the High-Priest's Chamber, the player must wager at least 2 Treasures. The player again rolls one of the numbered dice and must roll an even number to beat the table.
- The Queen's Chamber: In the Queen's Chamber, the player must wager at least 3 Treasure cards. The player tosses the provided coin. In a reversal of the phrase "Heads, I win, Tails, you lose", if the coin comes up Tails, the player wins; Heads, the player loses.
- The King's Chamber: The player must wager at least 4 Treasure cards in the King's Chamber. The player chooses 2 of the cards they have wagered to play with and rolls 1 of the symbol dice. If the symbol on the die matches either of the two cards, the player beats the table.

The first time a player beats the table in a Chamber, they place a scarab there. In instances where a player beats a table on return trips to Chambers where they already placed a scarab, they double their wager instead, meaning they keep their stake and take the same number of Treasures from the deck. In this way, a player can try and use the Chambers to earn extra Treasure (though it's always a gamble) and can go as high as they like on their stake each time, but must wager at least the minimum. Each time a player fails to beat a table, they lose their wager and must return the Treasures they wagered to the bottom of the deck. Players can stay inside a Chamber and try again on their next turn as long as they have enough Treasure for the minimum wager, otherwise they must leave on their next turn and continue clockwise around the board.

As soon as a player has placed all 4 of their scarabs in the 4 Chambers and has 3 or more Treasures in their hand, they head for the Chamber with Khufu's Sarcophagus in it. As soon as they reach the Chamber, they press the Menu or Title button on the DVD remote to play Khufu's Ultimate Challenge, a round of pharaoh-style poker. This will also pause the countdown. First, Khufu shows his hand of 3 cards on-screen. Khufu's servant, Lucky (or another player if Lucky is facing the challenge), then shuffles all the player's Treasure cards and deals 5 cards face up or deals out as many as the player has if they only have 5 or less (i.e. if the player faces the challenge with only 4 Treasures, Lucky will deal all four and if the player only has 3, Lucky just deals all three). The aim is to create the strongest poker hand with the greatest number of matching symbols. The player chooses the best 3 cards to be their hand. They then roll both of the symbol dice. To make up their final hand, the player combines the symbols on the dice with the symbols on their 3 cards. They then also combine the same dice symbols with Khufu's cards on-screen to complete his hand. The hand ranking from best to worst is five of a kind down to one pair or less (only the number of matching symbols counts as the symbols themselves have no value, i.e. 5 Kings are equal to 5 Cats and so on); the best hand wins. If the player's hand is better than Khufu's, they take the DVD remote and select "Win", winning the game. If the player's hand is worse than Khufu's, they lose and must return the 3 Treasures they used to the bottom of the deck. If the player and Khufu's hands are both equal, the round ends in a draw. In the instance of a loss or draw, the player must select the "Lose/Draw" button, move their piece to the Curse space furthest from the Chamber the challenge was played in and the game continues as normal.

== Characters ==
The seven Harbingers in the game are: Anne de Chantraine the witch; Baron Samedi the zombie; Elizabeth Bathory the vampire; Gevaudan the werewolf; Helin the poltergeist; and Medusa the gorgon. Each of the Harbingers is based on either a real person or a myth, except for Helin. Helin, literally "in hell" reversed, is the only Harbinger entirely created by Brett Clements. Helin is also the only character with barely any background information, because Brett wanted players to use their own imagination for this character. Baron Samedi got his name from the ancient Arawak Indian God of the Dead. Anne de Chantraine is based on a 21-year-old French lady who was burned at the stake for witchcraft. Elizabeth Bathory is based on a serial killer who is believed to have murdered and drunk the blood of about six hundred and fifty virgin girls. Gevaudan is based around a man who was hunted by armies of people for supposedly carrying the sickness of lycanthropy. Medusa was a gorgon who went on a rampage turning people into stone after her hair was transformed into snakes. The final character in the game is Khufu and is based on the Fourth Dynasty Egyptian pharaoh, Khufu.

== Reception ==
Sunderland Echo called it "an exciting and demanding head-to-head game."

== See also ==
- List of Australian inventions
- List of board games
