= Atmosfear (series) =

1991 video board game

- Designers: Brett Clements; Phillip Tanner
- Illustrators: Richard McKenna; Carmen Delprat; Daniel Burns
- Publishers: J. W. Spear & Sons; Mattel; Flying Bark Productions; Creata IP
- Publication: 1991–present
- Genres: Horror
- Players: 3–6
- Setup time: 10 minutes
- Playing time: Up to 60 minutes
- Skills: Dice rolling and strategy

Atmosfear (previously known as Nightmare in certain regions) is an Australian horror video board game series released in 1991 by Phillip Tanner and Brett Clements. Two years after the game's launch in 1991, the two millionth Nightmare board game was sold. Since then, three game expansions have been released.

A major refresh to the series was released in 1995, titled The Harbingers, which sold above the industry's sales predictions in Australia and became one of the top-ten best-selling games in the United States and the United Kingdom within months of its release. In the same year, an interactive CD-ROM, Atmosfear: The Third Dimension, was released for Microsoft Windows.

The series was revived in 2004 with the release of The Gatekeeper, that included a DVD to replace the video cassette which, with the addition of a programmed 'randomizer', allows the creators to give a whole new game every time the DVD is played. A second DVD board game was released in 2006 entitled Khufu the Mummy, acting as a direct sequel.

A new re-release of the 2004 game was released in 2019 with an app replacing the DVD.

On November 12, 2021, a successful 30th anniversary reboot was launched through Kickstarter.

== Gameplay ==
The object of the game is to collect six different coloured "Keystones" and thus beat the host. For most games in the series, the "Gatekeeper" is the host, but in the 2006 game and the three expansions for the original one, other characters take the role of the host, introducing their own rules. To beat the host, the players must face their worst fear. If none of the players are able to win within the set time limit, the host is the winner.

A videotape, or in later games a DVD, is included with the game and acts as a game clock. The video stars the host of the game, who appears throughout the tape giving instructions to players. When a player has collected the Keystones, they can win the game by facing their earlier expressed "greatest fear", which is actually just a random event; if they are successful, they win the game.

== Characters ==
Atmosfear feature various characters based on real-life people or myths.

=== The Harbingers ===
- The Gatekeeper
- Anne de Chantraine, the Witch
- Baron Samedi, the Zombie
- Countess Elizabeth Bathory, the Vampire
- Gevaudan, the Werewolf
- Hellin (Helin in DVD editions), the Poltergeist
- Khufu, the Mummy
- Medusa, the Gorgon

=== The Soul Rangers ===
- Dr. Mastiff

== Games ==
=== Nightmare ===
Phillip Tanner and Brett Clements met in 1982 and a year later they both set up their own television production company, A Couple 'A Cowboys. They developed a pilot and took it to Village Roadshow, which within 24 hours signed a marketing and distribution agreement. Nightmare was released in September 1991. In Europe, the game was renamed to Atmosfear to avoid legal issues with the name Nightmare, which was already taken. Upon the game's release, a marketing campaign was launched with advertising appearing on television and in cinemas. The game was very popular in Australia, leading to sold-out "dance parties" and a number of advertising deals, including one with Pepsi. A song and a music video were also created for the game. Clements and Tanner sold the two millionth board game during the 1993 Christmas period.

==== Expansions ====
Following the success of Nightmare, four game expansions were announced, but only three were released. Each expansion included a new tape and new time and fate cards, with a different character hosting each tape. Nightmare II was hosted by Baron Samedi and released in 1992. Nightmare III was hosted by Anne de Chantraine and released in 1993. Nightmare IV was hosted by Elizabeth Bathory and released in 1994. The game's fourth expansion was to be hosted by Khufu and to be released in 1995, but faced with declining sales, it was cancelled and replaced by The Harbingers.

=== The Harbingers ===
With the feedback received from players after the release of Nightmare, Clements and Tanner started work on a major update to the series. They struck a deal with J. W. Spear & Sons, to use publishing experience and market research with Nightmare to help create the new game. The deal allowed J. W. Spear & Sons to have input into how the game was developed, which had not been the case with Nightmare. Village Roadshow was also involved with the game's development and with its release in the United States. The development ended six years after it started, with about six million dollars invested into it.

The Harbingers sold above the industry's sales predictions in Australia and became one of the top-ten best-selling games in the United States and the United Kingdom within months of its release. On the game's release, Mattel launched a marketing campaign with a spot on MTV, cross-promotions with soft drinks and a website for the game.

==== Booster tapes ====
Two booster tapes were released following the success of The Harbingers. The tapes provide a challenging experience for seasoned players. They run for forty-five minutes instead of the sixty minutes of the original, and come with a new rule to limit the number of Keystones added to each province based on the amount of players. Other than this limit, the normal rules apply.

==== The Soul Rangers ====
A year later, an add-on called The Soul Rangers was released. This allowed players to play only as The Soul Rangers. The add-on was released because the creators found that players enjoyed causing damage as The Soul Rangers.

=== Atmosfear: The Gatekeeper ===
After nine years of development, The Gatekeeper was released on 8 July 2004. Within six months of its release, 60,000 copies were sold, growing to 600,000 worldwide sales. The Gatekeeper came with a DVD instead of a videotape, with the help of random programming allowing the creators to give a whole new game every time the DVD is played.

=== Atmosfear: Khufu the Mummy ===
A second DVD board game was released in 2006 titled Khufu the Mummy.

=== ATMOSFEAR: The Gatekeeper ===
At the 2018 San Diego Comic-Con, A Couple 'A Cowboys and Hijynx Toys announced a forthcoming relaunch of the series for 2019.

In 2019, an app based version of the game was licensed by Creata IP and released in Australia, Spain and Portugal, with additional territories following in 2020. The rules are very similar to the 2004 game with some modifications, but the main change is The Gatekeeper, performed by Jacek Koman, who comes in the form of an app that works in conjunction with a smart device creating the perfect game of ATMOSFEAR. Multiple devices can be used during the game.

=== Atmosfear 30th Anniversary Edition ===
The Kickstarter for the Atmosfear 30th Anniversary Edition concluded on 13 December 2021. The Kickstarter had a total of 3,884 backers, and the game was backed for a total of AU $491,581 with a goal of AU $90,000.

== Timeline ==
VHS Release	Year	Harbinger	Character
Nightmare	1991	The Gatekeeper	
Nightmare II	1992	Baron Samedi	Zombie
Nightmare III	1993	Anne de Chantraine	Witch
Nightmare IV	1994	Elizabeth Báthory	Vampire
Atmosfear: The Harbingers	1995	The Gatekeeper	
Atmosfear: The Harbingers Booster Tape 1	1995	The Gatekeeper	
Atmosfear: The Harbingers Booster Tape 2	1995	The Gatekeeper	
Atmosfear: The Third Dimension	1995	The Gatekeeper	
Atmosfear: The Soul Rangers	1996	Dr. Mastiff	Skeleton
Atmosfear: The Gatekeeper	2004	The Gatekeeper	
Atmosfear: Khufu the Mummy	2006	Khufu	Mummy
Atmosfear	2019	The Gatekeeper	
Atmosfear 30th Anniversary Edition	2021	The Gatekeeper	

The Harbingers of Gévaudan the Werewolf and Hellin the Poltergeist were never made into board games.

== Controversy ==
In November 1996, the Independent Television Commission (ITC) in the United Kingdom received 21 complaints that a TV commercial for Atmosfear was too scary to be broadcast during children's programming. Eight of these viewers specifically mentioned that their children had been frightened. The ITC ruled that the commercial could no longer be broadcast in children's slots.

== Reviews ==
- Rue Morgue #41

== See also ==
- List of Australian inventions
- List of board games
