= Atmosfear: The Third Dimension =

1995 video game

- Developer: A Couple 'A Cowboys
- Publisher: EMG Publishing
- Platform: Microsoft Windows
- Release: 1995
- Genre: Strategy
- Modes: Single-player, multiplayer

Atmosfear: The Third Dimension is a 1995 video game developed by A Couple 'A Cowboys and published by EMG Publishing. It is an interactive software version of the Atmosfear series of video board games, specifically Atmosfear: The Harbingers.

== Gameplay ==
Gameplay screenshot

One to six players select a Harbinger, one fear from a list, and compete in an interactive contest set on a set of board games across eight areas, each reflecting one of the Harbingers. Players take turns rolling dice to move across the boards to locate keys to unlock doors that can guide them towards the Gatekeeper in the centre of the board. Players can also duel each other to steal their keys, or place a curse on them to reduce their movement. Duels consists of players depleting each other's power meters by using bonuses collected throughout gameplay. Each game has a time limit: if the players fail to reach the Gatekeeper in the time limit, all players lose. If the player is successful in meeting the Gatekeeper, the Gatekeeper discloses one of eight fears; if that fear is the same chosen by the player at the start of the game, they lose.

== Development ==
The Third Dimension was developed by studio A Couple 'A Cowboys, created by Australian designers Brett Clements and Phillip Tanner. Clements and Tanner created and launched the video board game Nightmare in 1991. Development of a multimedia CD-ROM version was announced in a licensing partnership with Time Warner Interactive and Village Roadshow under various working titles, including Atmosfear: Welcome to the Other Side and alongside development of Atmosfear: The Harbingers. The game was also announced at E3 1995. A version for the Philips CD-i was also planned. Development took place over two years, with its design and animation produced in Australia, and some programming taking place in the United Kingdom.

The game also came with a separate CD-Rom that contained the ambience used in The Harbingers. The intention being that this was to be played on a separate music player during the game, making it the only time any music used during any Atmosfear game saw an official soundtrack release.

== Reviews ==
Reception

Review scores
Publication	Score
Hyper	68%
PC Player	1/5

Dan Toose of Hyper praised the game's grotesque visual presentation, but felt it was "let down by a lack of variety in sounds and gameplay", also remarking that the duel system was unfair. PC Player enjoyed the game's sound effects, but felt the game contained "more punishments than rewards" due to the chance of losing the game due to the fear system, and the limited visibility on the game board.
