= Atmosfear: The Gatekeeper =

2004 video board game

- Designers: Brett Clements; Phillip Tanner
- Actors: David Whitney as The Gatekeeper
- Publishers: Flying Bark Productions
- Publication: 8 July 2004
- Genres: Horror and terror
- Players: 3–6
- Setup time: 1–2 minutes
- Playing time: up to 49 minutes
- Skills: Dice rolling Strategy

Atmosfear: The Gatekeeper is a video board game originating in Australia released in 2004 by A Couple 'A Cowboys and Flying Bark Productions as the first DVD version of the Atmosfear series.

It is recommended to create a perfect "Atmosfear" before playing the game, which includes dimming down the lights and turning up the volume for the video. The players then write their "greatest fear" on individual slips of paper and place it into the well of fears. The goal of the game is to collect six colored keys, working against a clock and the delaying tactics of the host, the Gatekeeper.

When the Gatekeeper starts the game, players move clockwise around the board; occasionally, the Gatekeeper will appear and issue instructions to one or all players. After a player collects the six required keys, that player then can attempt to win the game by reaching the center of the board. When the player reaches the center, the chosen one picks a "fear" from the well; if the player draws their own fear, they are declared the winner and the game ends. If the players are unable to reach the center within forty-nine minutes, the Gatekeeper wins.

The game is set in a place known as "The Other Side", ruled by six Harbingers, each of whom has authority over a Terrortory. To play the game, each player adopts the persona of one of the Harbingers: Anne de Chantraine the witch; Baron Samedi the zombie; Elizabeth Bathory the vampire; Gevaudan the werewolf; Helin the poltergeist, and Khufu the mummy. and the final character in the game is the Gatekeeper, whose job is to ensure that the other characters do not escape from The Other Side.

The game was later re-issued in 2010 for the franchise's 20th anniversary and then in 2019 with a new dedicated app.

== Gameplay ==
The new Gatekeeper.

In both booklet and DVD instructions it is recommended that players create a perfect "Atmosfear" before playing, which includes playing the game at night, dimming down the lights and turning up the volume for the DVD (with a suitable 5.1 Surround soundtrack). The board is set up with the keys, Time and Fate cards put on and beside the board. Players then write their greatest fear on individual slips of paper and place them -folded- into the Well of Fears in the center of the board. Then the players choose their playing pieces and corresponding character cards, as well as a numbered key rack. Once everything is set up, "Play" is then chosen from the main menu, summoning the Gatekeeper. When he asks who is playing, the players need to use the DVD remote to tell the Gatekeeper which characters are in the game; at least 3 players are required. He will then choose a "Chosen One" to act as his eyes and ears. The Chosen One rolls first to start the game. Once the game and on-screen countdown begin, pressing Stop or Pause on the remote is not possible.

The object is to win the game before 49 minutes expires. To do this, the players must collect six keys, one of each character's color, then head to the Well of Fears in the center of the board to face their "greatest fear" and finally press the Menu or Title button on the remote to win. However, if the countdown reaches zero, the Gatekeeper is declared the winner.

Starting from their characters' Headstones, players take it in turns to roll the dice and move clockwise around the board and can choose to roll one or two dice each time. Whenever the Gatekeeper appears on-screen, all players must stop, listen and do exactly what he says (e.g. when the Gatekeeper asks whose turn it is, they must answer with "Yes, my Gatekeeper"); failure to do so will result in punishment (a player must end their turn if they're in the middle of one when the Gatekeeper appears). Players start collecting keys by either landing on a space marked with a key on the game board or taking them from other players by duels. Players must collect all six different color keys, placing any keys they have in their rack facing towards them to hide the colors from opponents. Although players only need one key per color, players can collect more which prevent other players from completing the game. Should the Gatekeeper tell a player to take a key, they must take it from the realm they are in unless instructed otherwise. A Black Key is also on the board and must be avoided, otherwise the player who picks it up is "cursed" and unable to win the game as long as it's in their possession, even if they have one key of each color. Players can get rid of the Black Key by passing it on to another player when their pieces both occupy the same space or try to lose it in a duel. If a player lands on their own Headstone, they can earn a key from their realm by roling their own key rack number on the die; likewise, if an opponent lands on it, the player can take a key from that opponent by rolling their number. During the game players may come across objects to either make the game harder or easier, these include flight, dueling, black holes, Fate cards and Time cards. Flight allows players to travel from one flight stone on the game board to another unoccupied flight stone. Dueling allows players to duel other players to steal one of the players' keys, as long as the two players have keys of their own. A player can either be banished to a Black Hole by the Gatekeeper or stumble into one on the game board, temporarily rendering them unable to play. Players are only released from a Black Hole either by the Gatekeeper, having a Fate or Time card that releases them, trying to get their number on a dice roll each time their turn comes around or having possession of their corresponding colored key. In each case, a player must still move to a nearby Black Hole and wait for their next turn before being released. Fate cards are cards with instructions which the player must follow. The Gatekeeper will require a player to pick up a Fate card during the game. Just like Fate cards, Time cards have instructions which the player must follow, but players only carry out these instructions at a certain time in the game as defined on the card. The inner track (which is the only place on the board that players can travel in both directions) can be used at any time as a shortcut, though punishment will come to players if the Gatekeeper catches them there without six keys.

After a player has collected all six different color keys the player then can try to win the game by returning to the Well of Fears to face their fear. When the player reaches the well, on the player's next turn the Chosen One (or another player should it be the Chosen One who faces their fear) picks a fear from the well. If it is not the player's fear, they must return to their Headstone and try again, but if it is their fear, that player wins the game.

== Characters ==
The six Harbingers in the game are: Anne de Chantraine, the witch; Baron Samedi, the zombie; Elizabeth Bathory, the vampire; Gevaudan, the werewolf; Helin, the poltergeist, and Khufu, the mummy. Each of the Harbingers is based on either a real person or a myth, except for Helin. Helin, "in hell" reversed, is the only Harbinger entirely created by Brett Clements. Helin is also the only character with barely any background information, because Brett wanted players to use their own imagination for this character. Baron Samedi got his name from the ancient Arawak Indian God of the Dead. Anne de Chantraine is based on a 21-year-old French lady who was burned at the stake for witchcraft. Elizabeth Bathory is based on a serial killer who is believed to have murdered and drunk the blood of about six hundred and fifty virgin girls. Khufu is based on a Fourth Dynasty Egyptian Pharaoh. Gevaudan is based around a man who was hunted by armies of people for supposedly carrying the sickness of lycanthropy.

The final character in the game is the Gatekeeper, whose job is to make sure the other characters cannot escape from The Other Side to the real world. The Gatekeeper's character is based on the old cemetery gatekeepers, whose job was to guard cemeteries from grave robbers.

== Reception ==
After nine years of development, the Gatekeeper was released on 8 July 2004. In just six months of its release, 60,000 copies were sold, growing to 600,000 worldwide sales. The Gatekeeper came with a DVD instead of a videotape, which – with the help of random programming – allows the creators to give a whole new game every time the DVD is played.

The Daily Oklahoman said that "For game-players seeking a thematic Halloween diversion, AtmosFear will be a good purchase."

== See also ==
- List of Australian inventions
- List of board games
