= Khufu (disambiguation) =

Khufu or Cheops was an Ancient Egyptian pharaoh.

The word Khufu can also refer to:

- Great Pyramid of Giza, sometimes called Khufu's Pyramid or the Pyramid of Khufu
- Khufu The Mummy is a video board game, part of the Atmosfear series
- Khufu is a character in the Atmosfear (series)
- Khufu: The Secrets Behind the Building of the Great Pyramid, a 2006 book by Jean-Pierre Houdin
- Khufu (cipher), a block cipher
- The Khufu branch of the Nile River, a former tributary, now dry
- 3362 Khufu, an asteroid

== See also ==
- Cheops (disambiguation)
