= The Harbingers =

1995 video game

- The Harbingers game board.
- Designers: Brett Clements; Phillip Tanner
- Illustrators: Richard McKenna; Carmen Delprat; Daniel Burns
- Actors: Wenanty Nosul as The Gatekeeper
- Publishers: Mattel
- Publication: 1995
- Genres: Horror and terror
- Players: 3–6
- Playing time: Up to 60 minutes
- Age range: 12+
- Skills: Dice rolling and Strategy

Atmosfear: The Harbingers is an Australian video board game designed by Brett Clements and Phillip Tanner and published by Mattel as a major update to the Atmosfear series. The object of the game is to collect six different coloured "Keystones", face player's worst fear and thus beat the "Gatekeeper". Each player adopts the persona of one of the "Harbingers", otherwise must play as a "Soul Ranger". The game is set in a place known as "The Other Side". The Gatekeeper is to ensure the other characters do not "escape" from The Other Side. The game board is made up of a central hub and six two-sided interchangeable "Provinces" which fit together, creating a hexagon. A videotape is included with the game, and acts as a game clock. The videotape stars Wenanty Nosul as The Gatekeeper.

== Gameplay ==
=== Game rules ===
To really experience this game, spend some time creating the perfect atmosphere. Turn the lights down and volume up and welcome to the other side.

—Voice-over, during the opening of the rules presentation.

When they are ready, players roll the dice in turn, the one who rolls highest becoming the "Chosen One" who assembles the game board by connecting the Provinces to the central hub, creating a hexagon shape. The players write down their greatest fear on a slip of paper which is placed in the "well of fears" by the Chosen One. The Gatekeeper then starts the game, and the players, using their Numb Skulls, race to become a Harbinger by landing on the Harbinger's headstone located in each province. If a player fails to make it to a headstone within ten minutes, they become Soul Rangers for the rest of the game. If more than half the players fail to become Harbingers within ten minutes, the game is forfeited. They must remain in the sewers until either they are released by the Gatekeeper, or collect the Keystone which allows them to release themselves.

Players who become Harbingers start collecting Keystones either by landing on them on the game board, or by taking them from other players by dueling. Soul Rangers cannot collect Keystones by landing on them; instead, they chase down other players and steal their Keystones. Players must collect the six Keystones of different colours to win. Although players only need one keystone per colour, players can collect more than one which can prevent other players from completing the game. Each Keystone gives players different powers, depending on which Harbinger they are, the list of powers being described on the back of the character's card. When players have collected the Keystones, they can win the game by returning home to the central hub. Then they must roll a six on the dice; a fear is picked from the well of fears, and if it does not correspond to the player's earlier expressed "greatest fear", that player wins the game. Otherwise, players must return to their headstone and try again. If none of players is able to win the game within sixty minutes, the Gatekeeper is the winner.

=== Characters ===
The six Harbingers in the game are: Gevaudan the werewolf; Hellin the poltergeist; Khufu the mummy; Baron Samedi the zombie; Anne de Chantraine the witch, and Elizabeth Bathory the vampire. Each of the Harbingers is based on either a real person or a myth, except for Hellin. Hellin is the only Harbinger entirely created by Brett Clements.

Soul Rangers, players who have failed to become Harbingers, are described as miserable, skeletal scavengers, the scourge of The Other Side. Soul Rangers hunt down other players and steal their keystones. Soul Rangers were created during the game's development. Brett Clements wanted to introduce characters that players did not want to become, but he later found that players enjoyed the anarchic role of the Soul Ranger. The final character in the game is the Gatekeeper, whose job is to make sure the other characters cannot escape from The Other Side to the real world. The Gatekeeper's character is based on the old cemetery gatekeepers, whose job was to guard cemeteries from grave robbers.

=== Layout ===
The game board is made up of the Central Hub and six two-sided Provinces which fit together creating a hexagon. The Central Hub is made up of the Well of Fears, the home positions and the Ring Road. The Well of Fears is a cup with a lid that fits inside the hole in the middle of the Central Hub. Located around the Well of Fears are six numbered grooves, called "Home"; players must start from and return to Home. The Home positions are connected to the Ring Road, a path that runs around the Central Hub. The Ring Road give players access to all the Provinces.

Each Province is a two-sided interchangeable board, on one side of which is a Harbinger's province while on the other are the sewers. The Provinces can be assembled in any order, which can allow different game experiences when the Provinces are changed. Each Province has its own headstone and is in the Harbinger's colours. Both sides of the Province board have paths used by the players to move around the board. Located along the paths are the six Keystones for that colour Province, and three different game symbols: the black holes, the lightning bolts and the compasses.

The game includes six boomerang-shaped slabs which allow players to store their character card, Numb Skull and collected Keystones. The character card has a photograph of the character on the front, and on the back a list of powers each keystone gives to the player. To move around the game board, players use their own character's playing pieces: a vampire bat for Elizabeth Bathory, a cobra for Khufu, a top hat for Baron Samedi, an "H" building block for Hellin, a fang for Gevaudan, a cauldron for Anne de Chantraine and a Numb Skull for Soul Rangers. The Numb Skull is also used at the beginning of the game, before players become Harbingers.

=== Videotape ===
An image of the video videotape with the Gatekeeper on screen talking to players with the game clock in the right-hand corner and the CGI storm in the background.

A VHS videotape is included with The Harbingers which is played during the game. The videotape begins with The Gatekeeper – played by Wenanty Nosul – starting the game with "On your marks...Get ready...Get set...Go!". As the game begins the game clock appears in the top right corner of the screen, counting down from sixty minutes; unless the game is won by a player within one hour the Gatekeeper is declared the winner. During the sixty minutes the Gatekeeper will appear on screen, to give players instructions or a choice between receiving a prize or imposing a penalty on an opponent. Players must carry out all instructions given by the Gatekeeper. When the Gatekeeper appears he demands that players stop and listen to him. He will not hold back from insulting players and is reluctant to reward or help players. During the game a computer-generated storm can be seen in the background; sometimes the storm partly covers the game clock. Along with the storm, spooky sounds and sometimes the Gatekeeper's laughter can be heard.

During development there was a concern that the game might initially seem too complicated. At the end of the videotape there is a special fifteen-minute presentation called the rules presentation in which a voice-over along with the Gatekeeper explains the game, the characters and how to play. The rules presentation was created to help explain the game to new players. The videotape can be forwarded to the start of the instructions. During the rules presentation a game is played by actors who are dressed as three Harbingers – Baron Samedi, Anne de Chantraine and Elizabeth Bathory – and three Soul Rangers. The demonstration game is used throughout the rules presentation to help explain how to play the game. There would be a later version of the video where the rules would actually be presented at the start of the tape, rather than at the end, with the instruction that the Chosen One should rewind the video said by the narrator being completely removed and replaced by a countdown till the time the actual game begins. The Gatekeeper then begins the game as normal.

== Development ==
With the feedback received from players after the release of Nightmare, Brett Clements and Phillip Tanner started work on the major update to the series. They struck a deal with J. W. Spear & Sons, to use publishing experience and market research with Nightmare to help create the new game. The deal allowed J. W. Spear & Sons to have input into how the game was developed, which was not the case with Nightmare. Village Roadshow was also involved with the game's development and with its release in the United States. The development ended six years after it started, with about six million dollars invested in the development of the game.

== Reception ==
The Harbingers sold above the industry's sales predictions in Australia and became one of the top ten best selling games in the United States and the United Kingdom, within months of its release. On the game's release, Mattel launched a marketing campaign with a spot on MTV, cross-promotions with soft drinks and a website for the game.

== Expansions ==
=== Booster tapes ===
Two booster tapes were released following the success of The Harbingers. The tapes provide a challenging experience to The Harbingers for experienced players. The booster tapes run for forty-five minutes instead of the sixty minutes of the original, and come with a new rule to limit the number of Keystones added to each province based on the number of players. Other than this limit the normal rules apply.

=== The Soul Rangers ===
A year later, an add-on called The Soul Rangers was released. The add-on allows players to play only as The Soul Rangers and is hosted by a Soul Ranger calling himself Dr. Mastiff. The add-on was released because the creators found out that players enjoy causing damage as The Soul Rangers.

This game had a major variation in the rule conditions of the base game in that players start out with all keystones of each color in their possession and, upon becoming their chosen Soul Ranger, must get rid of their keystones -by "dumping" them either on the spaces on the board or on other players- before they can head back home. Each player could also, upon getting rid of a certain keystone, choose to use their Numb Skull token as a "Grunt" whenever their turn came around. Each Soul Ranger also had a unique special skill that could be used also after getting rid of a certain keystone. The win condition was also changed so that if a fear drawn from the well corresponded with the player's earlier written fear (in this case, "what disgusted them most"), they won the game.
