= Cheops (disambiguation) =

Cheops or Khufu, was an ancient Egyptian monarch.

Cheops or CHEOPS may also refer to:

- CHEOPS, a space telescope
- Khéops, the stage name of the French disk jockey Éric Mazel
- Cheops, a boulder on the surface of the comet 67P/Churyumov-Gerasimenko

== See also ==
- Khufu (disambiguation)
