= Nightmare (Atmosfear series) =

1991 horror video board game

- Designers: Brett Clements; Phillip Tanner
- Actors: Wenanty Nosul as The Gatekeeper (Nightmare)
- Publishers: J. W. Spear & Sons
- Publication: 1991
- Genres: Horror and terror
- Players: 2–6
- Setup time: 1–2 minutes
- Playing time: up to 60 minutes
- Age range: 12+
- Skills: Dice rolling

Nightmare is an interactive horror video board game that combines elements of traditional board games with multimedia components. It was released in 1991 by A Couple 'A Cowboys and J. W. Spear & Sons as part of the Atmosfear series.

The game is set in a place known as "The Other Side". This place has six Harbingers, each of whom has authority over a Province. To play the game, each player adopts the persona of one of the Harbingers: Gevaudan the werewolf; Hellin the poltergeist; Khufu the mummy; Baron Samedi the zombie; Anne de Chantraine the witch, and Elizabeth Bathory the vampire. The final character in the game is the Gatekeeper, whose job is to ensure that the other characters do not escape from The Other Side.

== Gameplay ==
The game requires 3–6 players to attempt to collect keys while trying to beat the clock included on the video cassette. At random intervals, the game stops and The Gatekeeper appears to either taunt, reward, or penalize the players in a variety of ways. Prior to beginning the game, the players are required to write their "greatest fear" on individual slips of paper. The game is won by collecting six keys of the player's character color before making it to the center of the game board where the player draws a 'fear'. If that player draws someone else's fear, the tape is stopped and that player is declared the winner. If no one is able to accomplish this within 60 minutes, the Gatekeeper is declared the winner.

== Characters ==
The six Harbingers in the game are:

- Gevaudan: the werewolf with a ferocious temper.
- Hellin: the poltergeist whose wails signal misfortune.
- Khufu: the mummy with a penchant for curses.
- Baron Samedi: the zombie with a macabre sense of humor.
- Anne de Chantraine: the witch
- Elizabeth Báthory: the vampire.

Each of the Harbingers is based on either a real person or a myth, except for Hellin. Hellin, "in hell" reversed, is the only Harbinger entirely created by Brett Clements. Hellin is also the only character with limited background information, as Brett wanted players to use their own imagination for this character. Baron Samedi got his name from the voodoo loa of the dead, though the game's creators misattribute him as the ancient Arawak Indian God of the Dead. Anne de Chantraine is based on a 17-year-old French girl who was burned at the stake for witchcraft. Elizabeth Bathory is based on a serial killer who is believed to have murdered and drunk the blood of about six hundred and fifty virgin girls. Khufu is based on a Fourth Dynasty Egyptian Pharaoh. Gevaudan is supposedly based around a man who was hunted by armies of people for supposedly carrying the sickness of lycanthropy, but actually named after a rampant wolf.

The final character in the game is the Gatekeeper (played by Belarusian actor Wenanty Nosul), whose job is to make sure the other characters cannot escape from The Other Side to the real world. The Gatekeeper's character is based on the old cemetery gatekeepers, whose job was to guard cemeteries from grave robbers.

Each expansion or sequel in the series introduced new characters and variations, maintaining player interest and adding to the game's replayability.

== Video ==
Packaged with the game is a sixty-minute video cassette that explains how to set up and play the game. The video contains footage of The Gatekeeper, a man who often interrupts the game to occasionally punish or reward the players at random. For example, if a player fails to answer him with "Yes, my Gatekeeper", he may banish them to the Black Hole. At the end of the game, if no player has won, the Gatekeeper appears and ends the game, declaring himself the winner.

== Development ==
Phillip Tanner and Brett Clements met in 1982 – they were reporters for Simon Townsend's Wonder World – and a year later, they both set up their own television production company, A Couple 'A Cowboys. They developed a pilot and took it to Village Roadshow, who within 24 hours signed a marketing and distribution agreement. Nightmare was released in September 1991. In Europe, the game was renamed to Atmosfear to avoid legal issues with the name Nightmare, which was already taken. On the game's release, a marketing campaign was launched with advertising appearing on television and in cinemas.

Nightmare is renowned for its atmospheric production. The visuals, sound effects, and The Gatekeeper's performance all contribute to a genuinely creepy experience. The original VHS tape featured a dark, grainy aesthetic typical of early 90s horror media, enhancing the game's eerie ambiance. The later DVD versions improved upon the production quality, providing clearer visuals and better sound.

== Reception ==
The game gained a cult following due to its innovative use of a VHS tape (and later DVDs) to enhance the gaming experience. It became popular in Australia, leading to sold out "dance parties" and a number of advertising deals, including one with Pepsi. A song and a music video were also created for the game. Clements and Tanner sold the two millionth board game during the 1993 Christmas period. In Australia, it sold 100,000 units.

== Expansions ==
Following the success of Nightmare, four game expansions were announced but only three were released. Each expansion comes with a new tape, new time and fate cards and changes to rule conditions, with a different character hosting each new tape. Nightmare II was hosted by Baron Samedi and released in 1992. Nightmare III was hosted by Anne de Chantraine and released in 1993, and incorporated the use of spells. Nightmare IV was hosted by Elizabeth Bathory and released in 1994, and incorporated a punishment class based around vampires that played by their own set of rules. The game's fourth expansion was going to be released in 1995, but faced with declining sales of the series brought on by some twists in Nightmare IV (Bathory eliminating a player from the game completely in the last five minutes possibly chief among them), it was cancelled and replaced by The Harbingers.

During an interview with Hard Copy in 1992, they discussed the possibility of there being a movie based on the characters. This, too, fell through because of the declining sales.

In 2026, Mark Bonnano of Australian comedy group Aunty Donna released an hour long found footage video that acted as an playable expansion to the game, called "The Shadowman’s Nightmare".

== See also ==
- List of Australian inventions
- List of board games
