= Erpent =

Sub-municipality of the city of Namur, Belgium

Erpent Erpint (Walloon)
- Sub-municipality of Namur
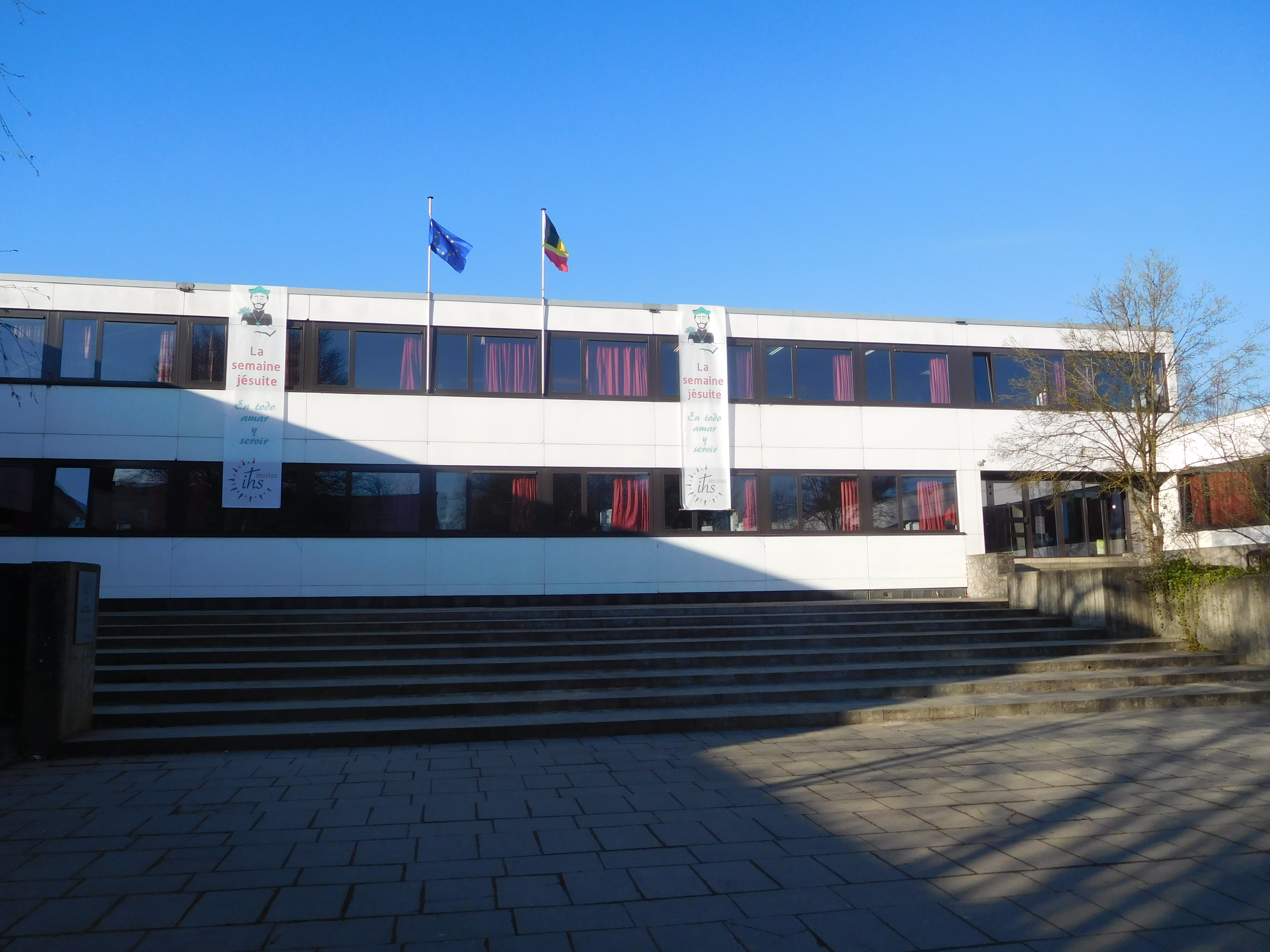

- Location of Erpent in Namur
- Interactive map of Erpent
- Location within Belgium Location within Namur Province
- Coordinates: 50°27′00″N 4°54′00″E
- Country: Belgium
- Community: French Community
- Region: Wallonia
- Province: Namur
- Arrondissement: Namur
- Municipality: Namur

Area
  - Total: 5.73 km^{2} (2.21 sq mi)

Population (2020-01-01)
  - Total: 2,778
  - Density: 485/km^{2} (1,260/sq mi)
- Postal codes: 5101
- Area codes: 081

Erpent (French pronunciation: [ɛʁpɑ̃]; Walloon: Erpint) is a sub-municipality of the city of Namur located in the province of Namur, Wallonia, Belgium. It was a separate municipality until 1977. On 1 January 1977, it was merged into Namur.
