= Dethridge wheel =

Irrigation tool with flow measurement

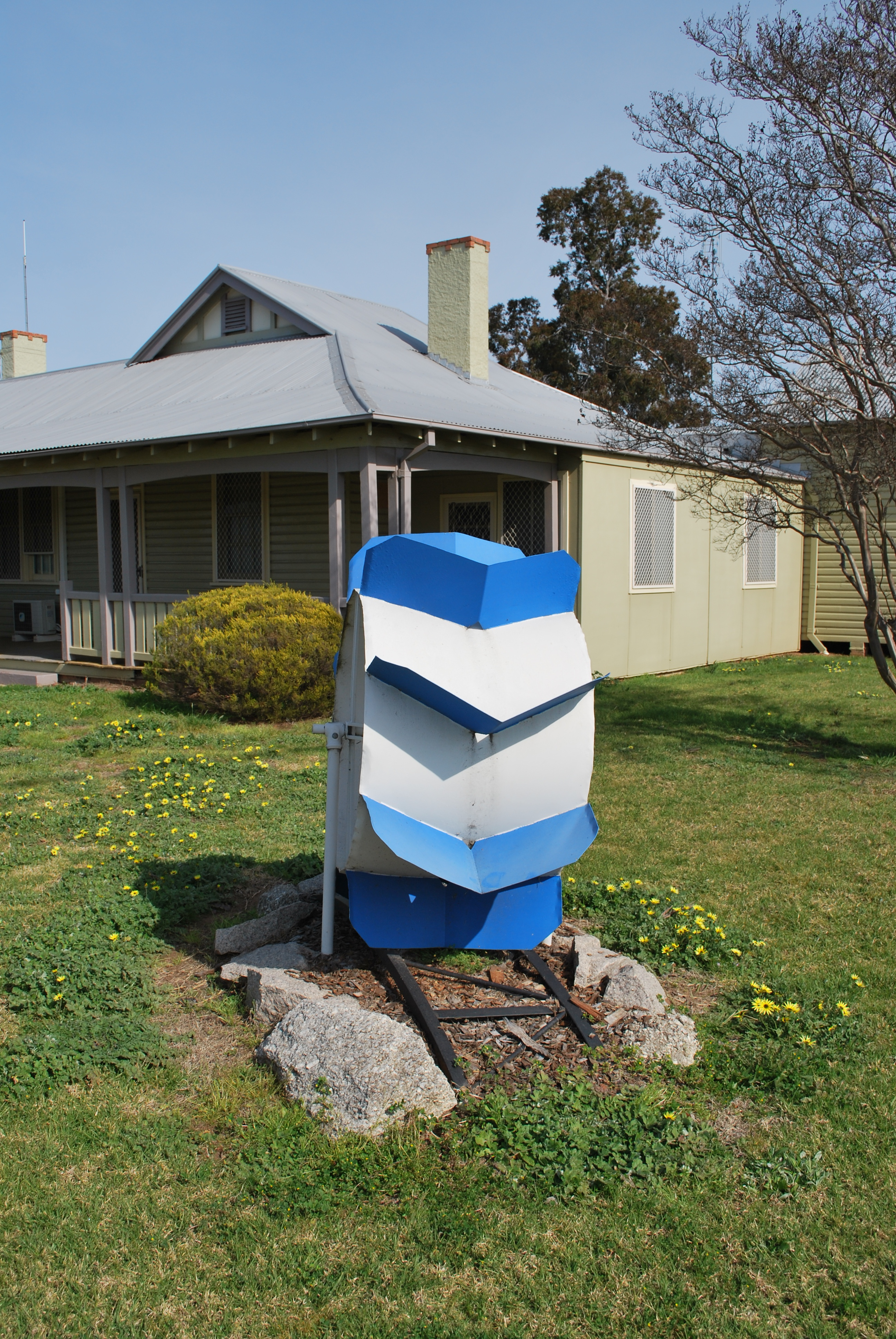
- Dethridge wheel in Finley, New South Wales, 2011
- Type: Irrigation management
- Inventor: John Stewart Dethridge
- Inception: 1910
- Notes; Origin: Victoria, Australia

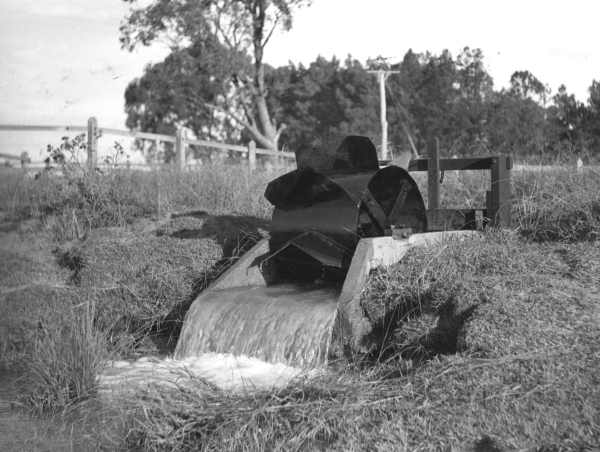
Dethridge wheel in 1936 – Victoria Australia

The Dethridge wheel is an irrigation tool that was invented in 1910 by John Stewart Dethridge (1865–1926). It works in a similar way to a traditional water wheel and rotates as water passes through its vanes. The rotations are then measured

The Dethridge wheel was prevalent throughout the 20th century and was used in several countries including Australia, India, Indonesia, Israel, Africa and the United States.

== History ==
In 1910, the Victorian State and Water Supply Commissioner, John Stewart Dethridge, developed the "Dethridge Direct-Measuring Water Meter" or "Dethridge Wheel". Its initial use was to accurately measure the flow of water at specific irrigation sites in Australia, especially in areas throughout New South Wales and Victoria. The flow of water had to be regulated to ensure that there was a sustainable and efficient use of the water in irrigation. The Dethridge Wheel was being used all the way until the 21st century and there are several countries that use its technological insights.

Due to the fact that Australia is vulnerable to drought and loss of water, The flow of water had to be regulated to ensure that there was a sustainable and efficient use of the water in irrigation. The Dethridge Wheel was not the only invention that was developed by John Dethridge, but it is widely regarded as one of the most influential pieces of machinery that he is credited with inventing.

The Dethridge wheel was used until the 21st century and there are several countries that use its technological insights. Due to its consistent use many people, especially in Australia, have an appreciation for the tool. In 1965, a memorial was erected in Griffith, New South Wales, Australia to commemorate the Dethridge Wheel and the Murrumbidgee Irrigation Area. The Murrumbidgee Irrigation Area or "MIA" is a portion of the Riverina Area which was established to bring water from local rivers to assist food production.

=== Past use ===
The Dethridge wheel was developed to measure water levels in irrigation canals as the water passed over land. It has been described as "simple" by faculty at the Darmstadt University of Applied Sciences as it used uncomplicated technology to measure the volume of water that passed through it. The wheel functioned by allowing water to pass under it, in turn causing the wheel to spin. The speed of the wheel's rotations while water was passing through would then be measured and would provide accurate data concerning the use of water for farmers throughout Australia.

The wheel was an influential tool for water usage and sustainability throughout the 20th century. One of the locations where the Dethridge wheel was used continually is the Murray-Darling Basin Area. The area is 1,061,000 million square kilometres (410,000×10^{6} sq mi) and encompasses the Murray and Darling rivers, which are among the longest rivers in all of the Australian Continent.

In 1950, a quarterly review of irrigated dairy farms in Victoria was released. It mentioned the use of the Dethridge wheel as a water measurement device and said, "Figures for water used must be treated with reserve due to the difficulties associated with the measurement of water delivered to farms, even where the Dethridge wheels are installed". Early first-hand accounts of the Dethridge wheels use in the 1950s provide evidence of the importance of the wheel as an irrigation tool in Australia.

== Modern use ==
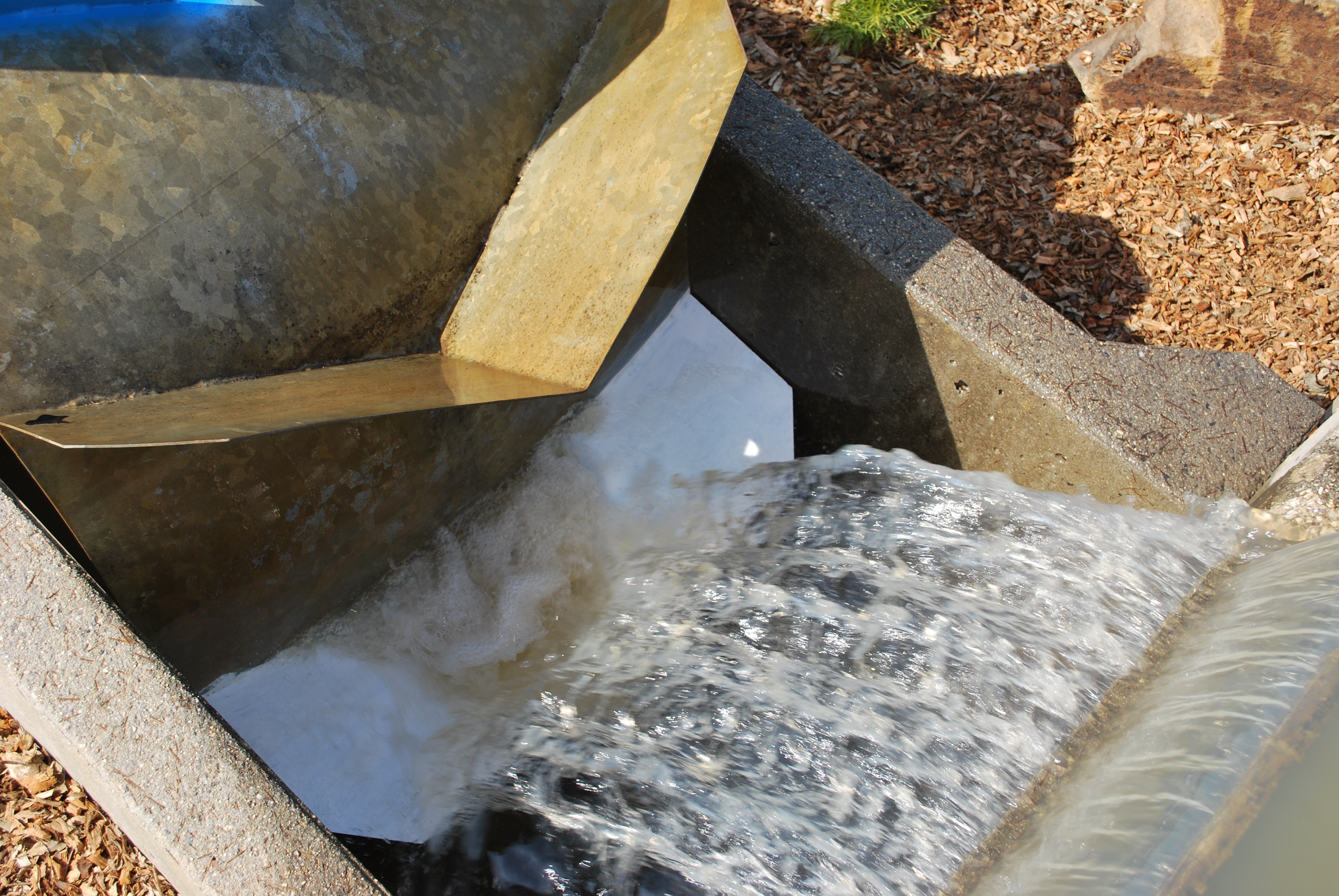
An ornamental Dethridge wheel at Finley, New South Wales

At the start of the 21st century, the Dethridge wheel began to fall into obsolescence. The importance of water management and water allocation systems was being continually investigated. Research was beginning to show that tools such as the Dethridge wheel were too inaccurate and didn't have an outlook of environmental fragility. In 2002, the TCC or "Total Channel Control" system was implemented in several water canals throughout the Northern parts of Victoria, Australia. The TCC was part of a broad effort to modernize the irrigation techniques and to bring more sustainability in open canal water distribution.

Channel Automation was piloted in 2002 in the Central Goulburn Channel System in the Shepparton irrigation region of northern Victoria. Dethridge wheels were replaced by newer technology known as FlumeGate, which was introduced by the Total Channel Control system. FlumeGate aimed to supersede the use of the Dethridge wheels and provide more accurate measurement data for irrigators. Although these new additions were supported by government funding, it was stated that the new technology had received negative feedback from individual irrigators.

The effort to push to more efficient irrigation techniques was heavily influenced by the Northern Victorian Irrigation Renewals Project (NVIRP), which recognized the environmental impacts in the late 1990s. Due to the fact that the Dethridge Wheel's design causes it to block any given flow of water, it results in lots of disturbance, in turn causing a substantial loss of water and affecting water consumption over time. Observations of water consumption were taken in Northern Victoria and they found that the distribution of water in the area was losing about 990 gigalitres of water each year. Additionally, the Northern Victoria Irrigation Renewals project worked closely with community groups and government agencies to bring modernization to the Goulburn Murray irrigation District (GMID). The significance behind the Goulburn Murray Irrigation District is supported by irrigation statistics. The Goulburn Murray Irrigation District covers an area 65,000 km^{2} (25,000 sq mi) and contributes around 30% of Victoria, Australia's gross agricultural production.

The Dethridge wheel was studied to see its potential as a Low Head Power Generator. In the early 21st century the transition to environmentally sound technology was introduced by the Kyoto Protocol of 1997. The aim was to reduce overall greenhouse gas emissions as fears of climate change were realized. The Dethridge wheel was experimented with to see how it could be used as a hydroelectric power generator for low head sites in open channel flow. The Dethridge wheel offered the same effect that a Zuppinger Wheel when being tested as a low head power generator, and was considered effective in its implementation when using irrigation to produce energy.

Dethridge wheels were replaced by fully automated machinery such as Total Channel Control to prevent loss and leakage in irrigation efforts. Total Channel Control offered water metering and promised an increase in the peak flow rates of water. Measurements taken from Goulburn Murray Water Field also found that the Dethridge Wheel was causing irrigators to receive more water than they were supposed to which brings into question the cost-effectiveness of the Dethridge Wheel when being used as an irrigation meter.

In 1999, the Dethridge wheel was used as a water meter and measured the volumes of drainage to improve drainage systems in Griffith, New South Wales by CSIRO Land and Water. The Griffith City Council aimed to improve the sewage systems around Griffith which is a major regional city in the Murrumbidgee Irrigation Area. The Dethridge wheel's use in sewage and waste management in the area is one of many reasons why it has held a significance in Griffith, New South Wales.

In an attempt to improve the performance of the Dethridge wheel and to study its use as a hydraulic device, two researchers, S. Paudel and N. Saenger, developed a "CFD" or Computational Fluid Dynamics model of the wheel. Paudel and Saenger worked at the Department of Civil Engineering, Darmstadt University of Applied Sciences, and were influential in research behind the Dethridge wheel. They worked to develop a three-dimensional CAD model of the wheel and ran tests to measure flow characteristics and different physical aspects. The development of a Computational Fluid Dynamic model is described as tedious due to the free-flowing aspects of water and its interaction with a moving object.

=== Channel automation controversy ===
Although the turn of the century largely marked the end of the Dethridge wheel's widespread use, there was still frequent debate behind the newer Channel Automation. Automation that was heavily influenced by the Northern Victoria Renewals Project and channel automation systems which were introduced in 2002 left irrigators in controversy. The new FlumeGates that were introduced to several northern irrigation points promised to improve ordering time and speed up irrigation. Regardless of the improvements or lack thereof, the channel automation received negative feedback and ultimately left the Victorian Government confused.

== Data ==
The Dethridge wheel was used as a hydroelectric power generator and it was used in experiments by many different scientific studies. Its importance as a low head power generator was backed up by statistics relating to hydropower. Out of all the world's total renewable and green electricity supply, hydropower makes up 76%. The Dethridge wheel was found to have an efficiency of 60% when implemented for electricity.

Research conducted in Indonesia found that the efficiency of the Dethridge wheel when being used for hydropower decreases when the water discharge is increased. This observation was attributed to the rotation of the wheel not being in proportion to the discharge of water.
