= Lars Rasmussen =

Lars Rasmussen may refer to:

- Lars Løkke Rasmussen, Former Prime Minister of Denmark
- Lars Rasmussen (software developer), Danish Australian software developer for Google and Facebook, co-founder of Google Maps
- Lars Rasmussen (handballer), Danish team handball player
