= Timeline of Australian inventions =

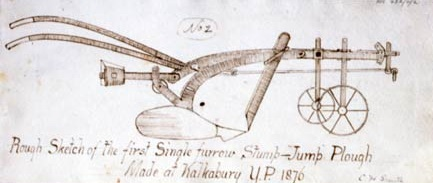
Plan of the original single-furrow stump-jump plough

This is a timeline of Australian inventions consisting of products and technology invented in Australia from pre-European-settlement in 1788 to the present. The inventions are listed in chronological order based on the date of their introduction.

Australian inventions include the very old, such as woomera, and the very new, such as the scramjet, first fired at the Woomera rocket range. The Australian government has suggested that Australian inventiveness springs from the nation's geography and isolation. Perhaps due to its status as an island continent connected to the rest of the world only via air and sea, Australians have been leaders in inventions relating to both maritime and aeronautical matters, including powered flight, the black box flight recorder, the inflatable escape slide, the surf ski and the wave-piercing catamaran winged keel. Since the earliest days of European settlement, Australia's main industries have been agriculture and mining. As a result of this, Australians have made many inventions in these areas, including the grain stripper, the stump jump plough, mechanical sheep shears, the Dethridge water wheel, the froth flotation ore separation process, the instream ore analysis process and the buffalo fly trap.

Australian inventions also include a number of weapons or weapons systems, including the woomera, the tank, and the underwater torpedo. In recent years, Australians have been at the forefront of medical technology with inventions including ultrasound, the bionic ear, the first plastic spectacle lenses, the electronic pacemaker, the multi-focal contact lens, spray-on artificial skin and anti-flu medication. Australians also developed a number of useful household items, including Vegemite, and the process for producing permanently creased fabric.

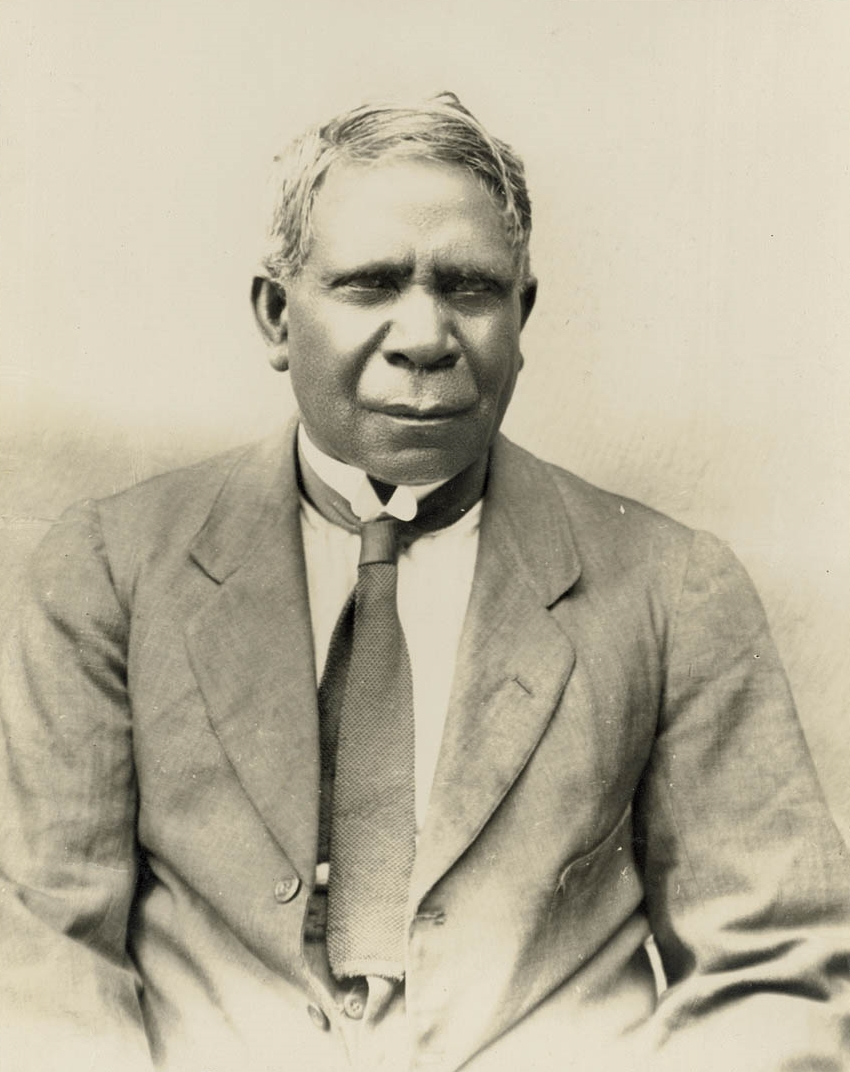
David Unaipon

Many of Australia's inventions were realised by individuals who get little credit or who are often overlooked for more famous Europeans.

Australian-Aboriginal man David Unaipon is known as "Australia's Leonardo" for his contributions to science and the Aboriginal people. His inventions include a tool for sheep-shearing, a centrifugal motor, a multi-radial wheel and mechanical propulsion device. Unaipon appears on Australia's $50 note.

The Commonwealth Scientific and Industrial Research Organisation (CSIRO) is an Australian-government-funded institution. A number of CSIRO funded scientists and engineers are featured in this list. CSIRO scientists lead Australian research across a number of different fields, and work with industry and government to solve problems such as using insects to tackle weeds, growing more sustainable crops and improving transportation.

== Aboriginal technology – before 1788 ==
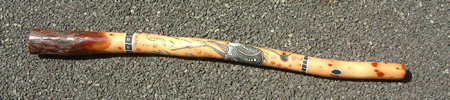
A didgeridoo

Mokare with spear and woomera; another woomera lies at his feet.

Ground-edge axe – Ground-edge axe heads recovered from the earliest occupation layers at Madjedbebe in Kakadu National Park are dated to around 65,000 years ago, which the University of Queensland describes as the oldest ground-edge stone axe technology in the world.

Boomerang – Boomerangs recovered from Wyrie Swamp, South Australia, in 1973 are about 10,000 years old, the oldest physical examples found in Australia. Rock art in the Kimberley depicting boomerangs is around 20,000 years old.

Didgeridoo – The didgeridoo is a wind instrument of northern Australia. It is sometimes described as a "drone pipe," but musicologists classify it as an aerophone. Traditionally, a didgeridoo was made by selecting a section of a Eucalyptus branch, then burying it near a termite mound so that the termites would hollow it out, to produce a long, hollow piece of wood suitable for fashioning the instrument.

Woomera – The woomera is a type of spear thrower, adding thrust to a spear as part of a throwing action.

Eel traps – The Gunditjmara people built an extensive system of channels, weirs and traps to farm eels at Budj Bim in western Victoria over at least 6,600 years. UNESCO lists it as one of the world's oldest and most extensive aquaculture systems.

== Colonial era – 19th century ==
1843 – Grain stripper – John Wrathall Bull invented and John Ridley manufactured in South Australia the world's first mechanised grain stripper. It utilised a comb to lift the ears of the crop to where revolving beaters deposited the grain into a bin.

1856 – Secret Ballot voting invented by Henry Chapman and first used in the Victorian election on 23 September 1856. Voters had their names marked off on the electoral roll at the polling place, were presented with a printed ballot paper, and retired to separate compartments to mark their ballot paper in secrecy before depositing it in a locked box watched over by the presiding officer, poll clerks and scrutineers.

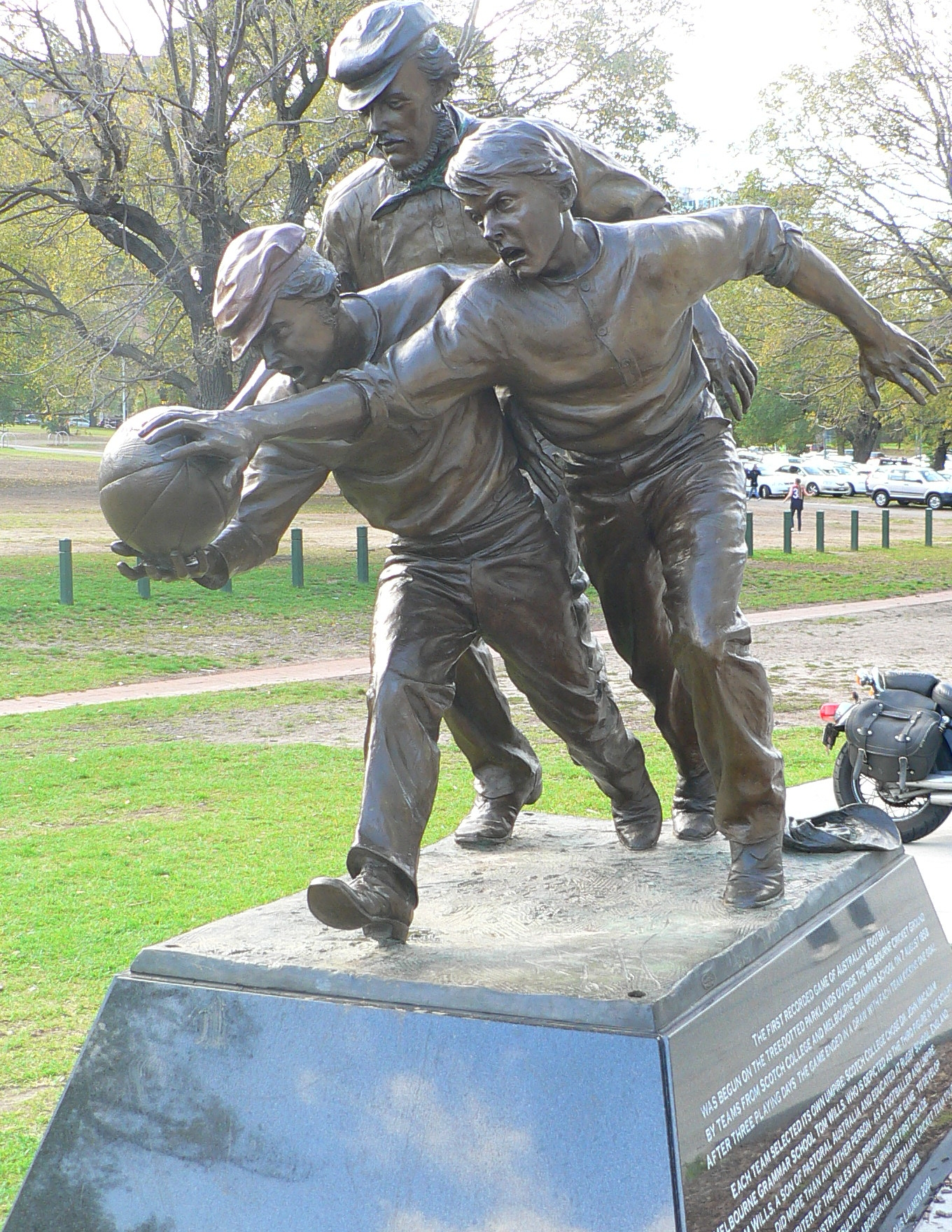
Statue next to the Melbourne Cricket Ground on the approximate site of the 1858 "foot-ball" match between Melbourne Grammar and Scotch College. Tom Wills is depicted umpiring behind two young players contesting the ball.

1858 – Australian rules football – began its development when Tom Wills wrote a letter published in Bell's Life in Victoria & Sporting Chronicle on 10 July 1858, calling for a "foot-ball club, a rifle club, or other athletic pursuits" to keep cricketers fit during winter. An experimental match was played by Wills and others at the Richmond Paddock, later known as Yarra Park next to the Melbourne Cricket Ground on 31 July 1858. The Melbourne Football Club rules of 1859 are the oldest surviving set of laws for Australian football. They were drawn up at the Parade Hotel, East Melbourne, on 17 May, by Wills, W. J. Hammersley, J. B. Thompson and Thomas Smith. The Melbourne club's game was not immediately adopted by neighbouring clubs. Before each match the rules had to be agreed by the two teams involved. By 1866, several other clubs had agreed to play by an updated version of Melbourne's rules.

1859 – Photolithography – developed by John Walter Osborne at the Victorian government's Crown Lands Office. During a land boom the Office had trouble producing the many maps and documents required to keep land records updated. Instead of having to copy surveyor's originals, or having to store stone originals, master copies saved were glass slides of around 6 inches (150 mm) square.

1868 – Granny Smith Apple – Propagated by Maria Ann Smith in Eastwood, New South Wales

1874 – Underwater torpedo – Invented by Louis Brennan, the torpedo had two propellers, rotated by wires which were attached to winding engines on the shore station. By varying the speed at which the two wires were extracted, the torpedo could be steered to the left or right by an operator on the shore.

1876 – Stump jump plough – Richard and Clarence Bowyer Smith developed a plough whose individual shares could jump over stumps and stones, enabling newly cleared land to be cultivated.

1877 – Mechanical clippers – Various mechanical shearing patents were registered in Australia before Frederick York Wolseley finally succeeded in developing a practical hand piece with a comb and reciprocating cutter driven by power transmitted from a stationary engine.

1880s - Early Television (Telephane) - Ballarat resident Henry Sutton (inventor) developed a device dubbed the ‘telephane’, a long, tube-shaped appliance designed to transmit images over telegraph and telephone wires. The Government Astronomer of Victoria confirmed that he witnessed the telephane, and it worked well. Sutton’s paper on the telephane was published widely in 1887, but Sutton did not patent the device.

1885 – Stripper harvester – Hugh Victor McKay built the Sunshine stripper harvester in 1884–85. By 1900 it was the most commercially successful Australian harvester design.

1889 – Electric drill – Arthur James Arnot patented the world's first electric drill on 20 August 1889 while working for the Union Electric Company in Melbourne. He designed it primarily to drill rock and to dig coal.

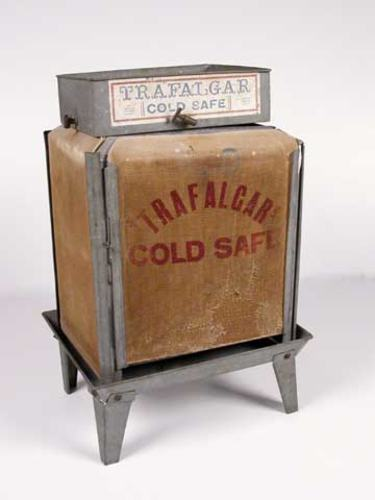
Coolgardie safe in the WA Museum

1892 – Coolgardie safe – Arthur Patrick McCormick noticed that a wet bag placed over a bottle cooled its contents, and the cooling was more pronounced in a breeze. The Coolgardie safe was a box made of wire and hessian sitting in water, which was placed on a verandah so that any breeze would evaporate the water in the hessian and via the principle of evaporation, cool the air inside the box. The Coolgardie safe was used into the middle of the 20th century as a means of preserving food.

1893 – Box kite – Invented by Lawrence Hargrave, the box kite is a high performance kite, noted for developing relatively high lift; it was used as part of his attempt to develop a manned flying machine. Having added a seat to four connected box kites, he flew with the kites 16 feet (4.8 metres) off the ground, proving to the world that it was possible to build a safe, heavier-than-air flying machine. Hargrave’s designs were quickly taken up by other inventors, including the American Octave Chanute with whom he was corresponding, and whose designs were later incorporated by the Wright brothers into their Wright Flyer, the first aircraft to achieve powered flight with a pilot on board in December 1903.

== 20th century Post-Federation – 1901–1945 ==
1902 – Notepad – For 500 years, paper had been supplied in loose sheets. Launceston stationer J. A. Birchall decided that it would be a good idea to cut the sheets in half, back them with cardboard and glue them together at the top.

1903 – Froth flotation – The process of separating minerals from rock by flotation was developed by Charles Potter and Guillaume Delprat in New South Wales. Both worked independently at the same time on different parts of the process for the mining company BHP

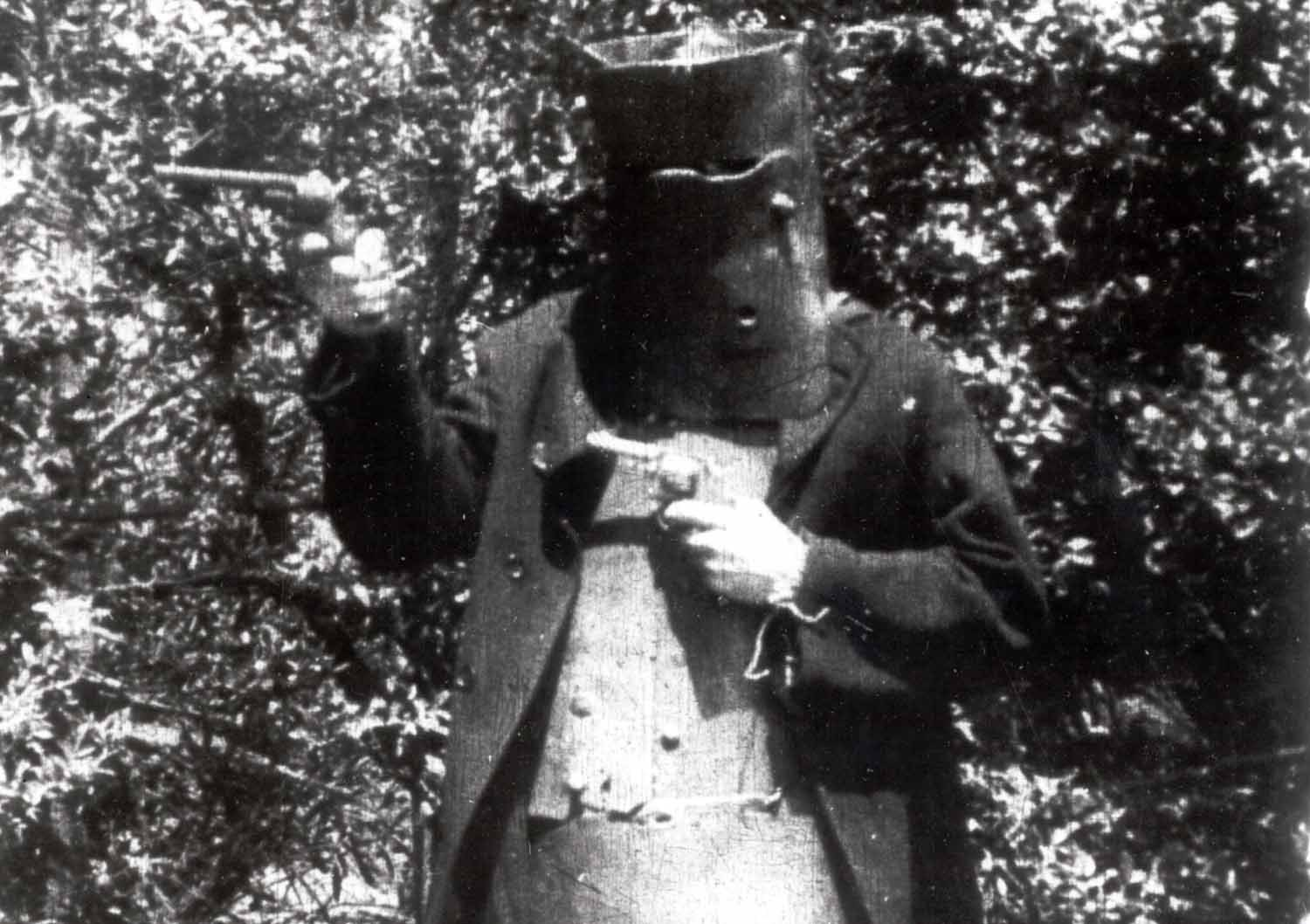
Still from 'Story of the Kelly Gang'

1906 – Feature film – The world's first feature-length film, The Story of the Kelly Gang, was a little over one hour long.

1906 – Surf life-saving reel – The first surf life-saving reel in the world was demonstrated at Bondi Beach on 23 December 1906 by its designer, surfer Lester Ormsby.

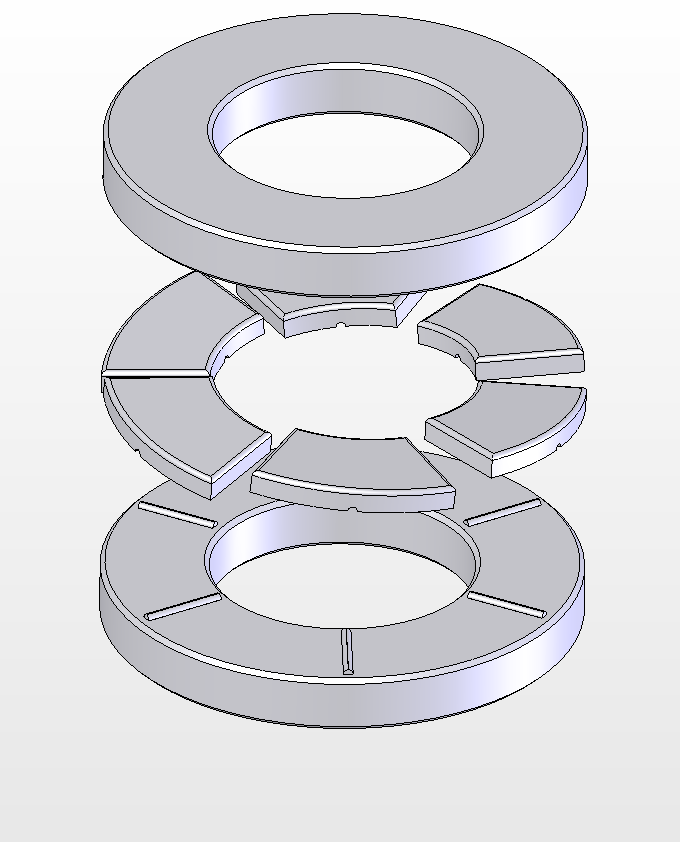
A fluid film thrust bearing

1907 – Michell thrust block bearing – Fluid-film thrust bearings were invented by Australian engineer George Michell. Michell bearings contain a number of sector-shaped pads, arranged in a circle around the shaft, and that are free to tilt. These create wedge-shaped regions of oil inside the bearing between the pads and a rotating disk, which support the applied thrust and eliminate metal-on-metal contact. The small size (one-tenth the size of old bearing designs), low friction and long life of Michell's invention made possible the development of larger propellers and engines in ships. They were used extensively in ships built during World War I, and have become the standard bearing used on turbine shafts in ships and power plants worldwide.

1910 – Humespun pipe-making process – The Humespun process was developed by Walter Hume of Humes Ltd for making concrete pipes of high strength and low permeability. The process used centrifugal force to evenly distribute concrete onto wire reinforcing, revolutionising pipe manufacture.

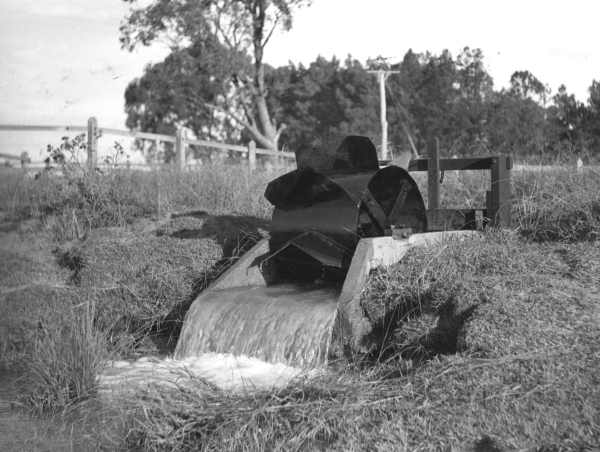
Dethridge wheel in 1936

1910 – Dethridge wheel – The wheel, used to measure the water flow in an irrigation channel, consisting of a drum on an axle, with eight v-shaped vanes fixed to its outside, was invented by John Dethridge, Commissioner of the Victorian State Rivers and Water Supply Commission.

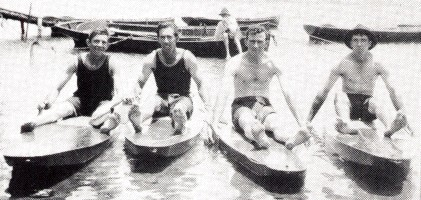
Harry McLaren, the first maker of surf skis, second from the left, with Ray Dick, Herb Reckless and Bert McLaren, left to right. 1919 on the Hastings River, Port Macquarie

1912 – Surf ski – Harry McLaren and his brother Jack used an early version of the surf ski for use around the family's oyster beds on Lake Innes, near Port Macquarie, and the brothers used them in the surf on Port Macquarie's beaches. The board was propelled in a sitting position with two small hand blades, which was probably not a highly efficient method to negotiate the surf. The deck is flat with a bung plug at the rear and a nose ring with a leash, possibly originally required for mooring. The rails are square and there is pronounced rocker. The boards' obvious buoyancy indicates hollow construction, with thin boards of cedar fixed longitudinally down the board.

1912 – Tank – South Australian Lance de Mole submitted a proposal to the British War Office, for a 'chain-rail vehicle which could be easily steered and carry heavy loads over rough ground and trenches,' complete with extensive drawings. The British war office rejected the idea at the time, but De Mole made several more proposals to the British War Office in 1914 and 1916, and formally requested he be recognised as the inventor of the Mark I tank. The British Royal Commission on Awards to Inventors eventually made a payment of £987 to De Mole to cover his expenses and promoted him to an honorary corporal.

1912 – Self-Propelled Rotary Hoe – At the age of 16 Cliff Howard of Gilgandra invented a machine with rotating hoe blades on an axle that simultaneously hoed the ground and pulled the machine forward.

1913 – Automatic totalisator – The world's first automatic totalisator for calculating horse-racing bets was made by Sir George Julius.

1915 – Periscope rifle – A periscope rifle is a rifle that has been adapted to enable it to be sighted by the use of a periscope, it was invented by Lance-Corporal W C Beech at Gallipoli. The device allowed a soldier to aim and fire a rifle from a trench, without being exposed to enemy fire. Beech modified a standard Lee–Enfield .303 rifle by cutting the stock in half. The two halves were re-connected with a board and mirror periscope, horizontally aligned to the sights of the rifle, as well as a string to pull the trigger, which allowed the rifle to be fired from beneath the line of fire.

1917 – Aspro – Aspro was invented by the chemist George Nicholas as a form of aspirin in a tablet. Nicholas developed a specialized dry granulation process to ensure salicylic acid would not be released, turning the formula into a reliable and stable tablet. Originally marketed as "Nicholas-Aspirin" from a makeshift laboratory in his St Kilda, Melbourne pharmacy, he renamed it "Aspro".

1919 – Non-perishable Anthrax vaccine – Metallurgist and bacteriologist John McGarvie Smith after long experimenting found an effective Anthrax vaccine which would keep for an indefinite period. Louis Pasteur had originally discovered a vaccine, which, however, would not keep.

1920 – Crankless engine– Engines that eliminated the need for a crankshaft found in most automotive and stationary engines was invented by Anthony Michell. The engines did not require connecting rod and bearings found in most engines and as such could be lighter and more compact.

1921 – Hart's Royal Dyes – English-born Australian inventor Eady Hart developed and patented Hart's Royal Dyes, a range of natural dyes used for colouring textiles.

1924 – Car radio – The first car radio was fitted to an Australian car built by Kellys Motors in New South Wales.

1924 – Stobie pole – A power line pole made of two steel joists held apart by a slab of concrete. It was invented by Adelaide Electric Supply Company engineer James Cyril Stobie.

1925 – Record changer – Invented by Eric Waterworth, a record changer (also called an autochanger) is a device that plays several phonograph records in sequence without user intervention. Record changers were common until the 1980s.

1927 – The Pedal Wireless – A pedal-operated two-way radio invented by Alfred Traeger.

1928 – Electronic Pacemaker – Developed by Edgar H Booth and Mark C Liddell, the heart pacemaker had a portable apparatus which 'plugged into a lighting point. One pole was applied to a skin pad soaked in strong salt solution' while the other pole 'consisted of a needle insulated except at its point, and was plunged into the appropriate cardiac chamber'. 'The pacemaker rate was not good from about 80 to 120 pulses per minute, and likewise the voltage variable from 1.5 to 120 volts.' The apparatus was used at Crown Street Women's Hospital, Sydney to revive a potentially stillborn infant whose heart continued 'to beat on its own accord', 'at the end of 10 minutes' of stimulation.

1928 – Aerial Ambulance – (Royal Flying Doctor Service) – Reverend John Flynn created the world's first air ambulance with the "Australian Inland Mission Aerial Medical Service", later being renamed to the Royal Flying Doctor Service (RFDS), designing and operating planes to respond to injured and ill people too far away from the nearest hospital to be transported by road before death occurred from their injuries. Flynn & Hudson Fysh, (a founder of QANTAS) signed an agreement to operate an aerial ambulance from Cloncurry, Queensland in 1927, with the first service beginning on the 5th of May 1928.

1929 – Starting blocks – Athlete Charlie Booth and his father are credited with the invention of the starting block. Starting blocks are a device used in the sport of track and field by sprint athletes to brace their feet against at the start of a race so they do not slip as they stride forward at the sound of the starter's pistol. The blocks also enable the sprinters to adopt a more efficient starting posture and isometrically preload their muscles in an enhanced manner. This allows them to start more powerfully and increases their overall sprint speed capability. For most levels of competition, including the whole of high-level international competition, starting blocks are now mandatory equipment for the start of sprint races.

1930 – Letter Sorting Machine – (Sydney's General Post Office (GPO)) was the site for the first mechanised letter sorter which was developed by an engineer with the Postmaster-General's Department.

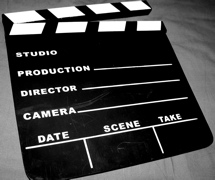
Clapperboard

1930 – Clapperboard – The wooden marker used to synchronise sound and film was invented by Frank Thring Sr of Efftee Studios in Melbourne.

1932 – Sunscreen – The first commercially produced sunscreen was created in 1932 by Australian chemist Milton Blake in Adelaide, South Australia. He launched "Hamilton’s Sunburn Vanishing Cream" through his company, Hamilton Laboratories, which was an early UV-absorbing cream that laid the groundwork for modern sun protection.

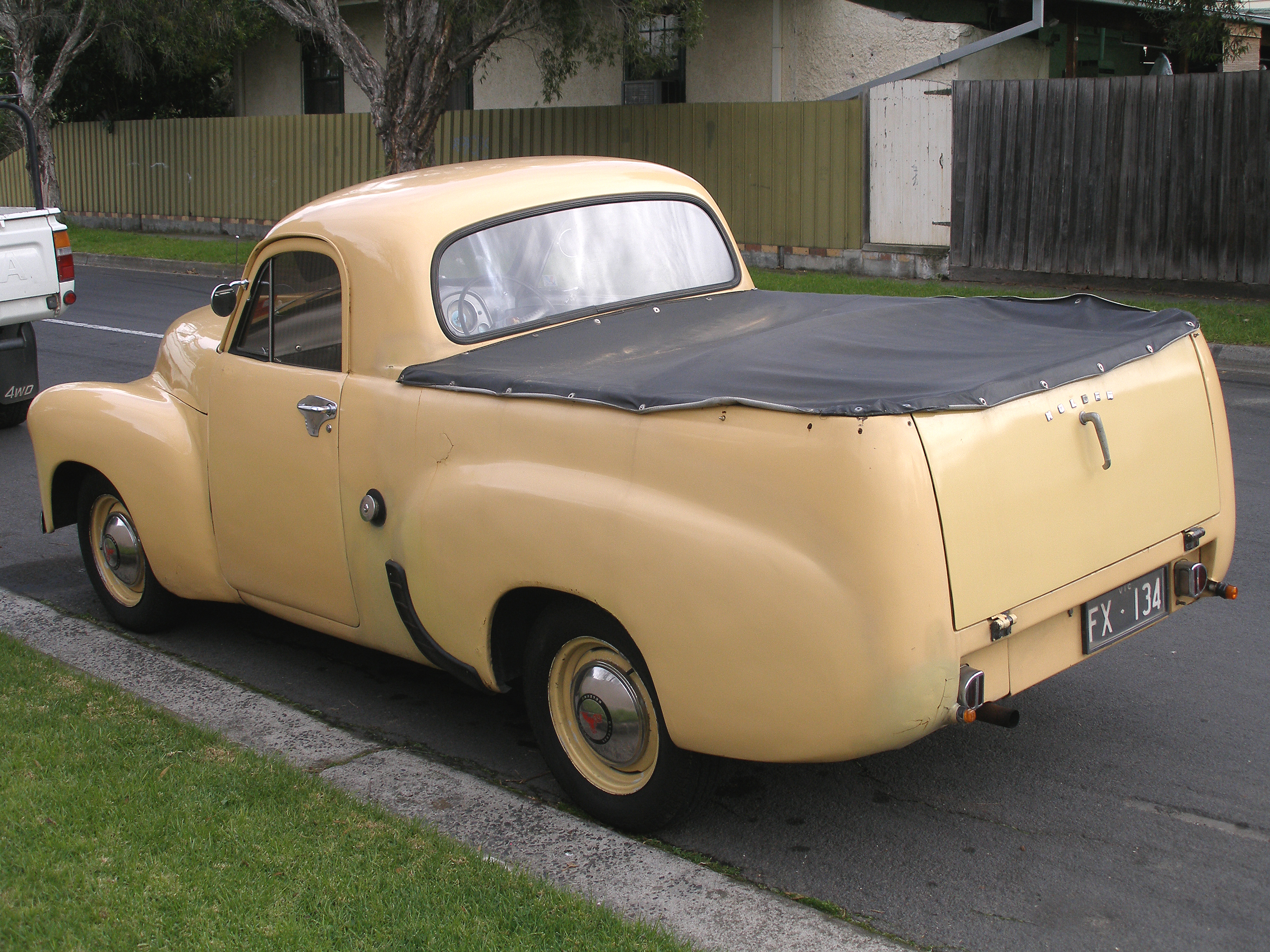
1951–53 Holden Coupe Utility (50-2106)

1934 – Coupé utility – The car body style, known colloquially as the ute in Australia and New Zealand, combines a two-door "coupé" cabin with an integral cargo bed behind the cabin—using a light-duty passenger vehicle-derived platform. It was designed by Lewis Bandt at Ford Australia in Geelong, Victoria. The first ute rolled off the Ford production lines in 1934. The idea came from a Geelong farmer's wife who wrote to Ford in 1933 advising the need for a new sort of vehicle to take her 'to church on Sundays and pigs to market on Mondays.'

1934 – Braille Printing Press – Minnie Crabb invented the Crabb-Hulme Braille Printing Press, the first Australian braille printing press and built to her specifications by H. Hulme. Designed to produce ephemeral material quickly, such as programs, catalogues and newsletters, and provided more opportunities for information to be quickly sent out to Braille readers across Australia.

1937 – Both respirator – Also known as the Both Portable Cabinet Respirator, was a negative pressure ventilator (more commonly known as an "iron lung") invented by Edward Both. The respirator was an affordable alternative to the more expensive designs that had been used prior to its development (such as "Drinker's" by Philip Drinker and Louis Agassiz Shaw in 1928), and accordingly came into common usage in Australia. More widespread use emerged during the 1940s and 1950s, when the Both respirator was offered free of charge to Commonwealth hospitals by William Morris.

1938 – Polocrosse – Inspired by a training exercise witnessed at the National School of Equitation at Kingston Vale near London, Mr. and Mrs. Edward Hirst of Sydney invented the combination polo and lacrosse sport which was first played at Ingleburn near Sydney in 1939.

1939 – Degaussing – The degaussing of ships to counter the threat of magnetic mines in the early days of World War II was invented and patented by mining engineer Franklin George Barnes, son of Australian politician George Barnes. Barnes' invention was later developed further by Charles F. Goodeve of Canada.

1940 – Zinc Cream – This white sun block made from zinc oxide was developed by the Fauldings pharmaceutical company.

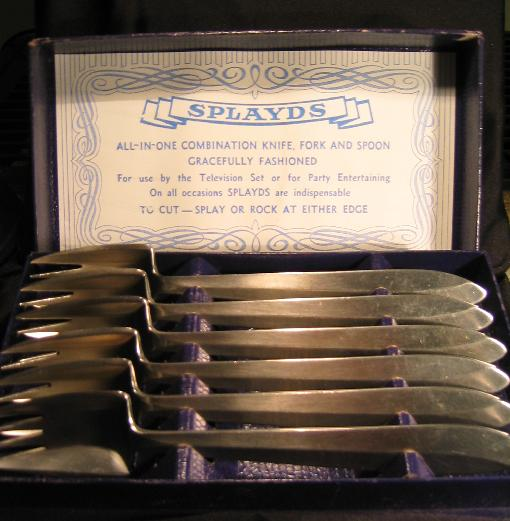
Splayd gift pack

1943 – Splayd – The combination of knife, fork and spoon was invented by William McArthur after seeing ladies struggle to eat at barbecues with standard cutlery from plates on their laps.

== 20th century Post-World War II ==
1945 – Hills Hoist – The famous Hills Hoist rotary clothes line with a winding mechanism allowing the frame to be lowered and raised with ease was developed by Lance Hill in 1945, although the clothes line design itself was originally patented by Gilbert Toyne in Adelaide in 1926.

1949 – Lithium therapy – Psychiatrist John Cade found that lithium salts calmed mania in patients at the Bundoora Repatriation Hospital in Melbourne and published his findings in the Medical Journal of Australia. Lithium had been tried for mania in the 19th century, but Cade's work began its modern use, leading to lithium's use in treating bipolar disorder.

1951 – Computer music – The CSIRO-made CSIRAC computer played the song 'Colonel Bogey March', becoming the world's first instance of computer-generated music.

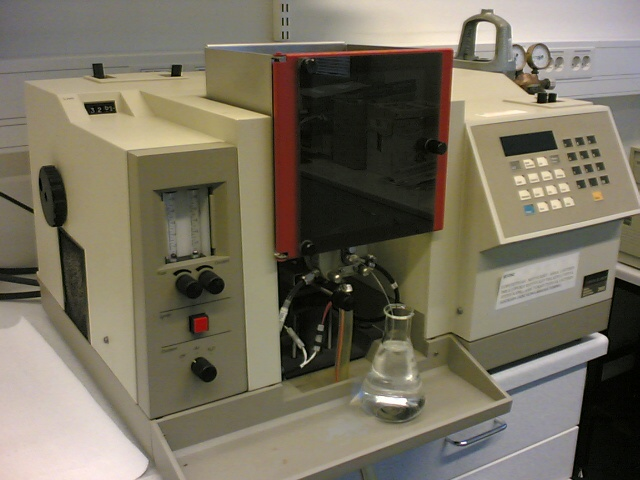
Atomic absorption spectroscopy

1952 – Atomic Absorption Spectrophotometer – The atomic absorption spectrophotometer is used in chemical analysis to determine low concentrations of metals in gases or vaporized solutions. It was developed by Sir Alan Walsh of the CSIRO using ionization lamps specific to the metal being detected.

1953 – Solar hot water – Developed by a team at the CSIRO led by Roger N Morse

1953 – Mills Cross Telescope – a two-dimensional radio telescope designed and invented by Bernard Yarnton Mills at the CSIRO.

1955 – Distance Measuring Equipment (DME) – Invented and developed by Edward George Bowen of the CSIRO, the first DME network, operating in the 200 MHz band, became operational in Australia. Distance measuring equipment is a radio navigation technology that measures the slant range (distance) between an aircraft and a ground station by timing the propagation delay of radio signals

1956 – Pneumatic broadacre air seeder – lightweight air seeder uses a spinning distributor, blew the seeds through a pipe into the plating tynes.

1956 – Stainless Steel Braces – Percy Raymond Begg of Adelaide collaborated with metallurgist Arthur Wilcock to develop a gentler, stainless steel system in 1956 involving gradual adjustments rather than earlier brute force methods used to straighten teeth.

1957 – Flame ionisation detector – The flame ionisation detector is one of the most accurate instruments ever developed for the detection of emissions. It was invented by Ian McWilliam. The instrument, which can measure one part in 10 million, has been used in chemical analysis in the petrochemical industry, medical and biochemical research, and in the monitoring of the environment.

1957 – Wool clothing with a permanent crease – "SiroSet," the process for producing permanently creased fabric, was invented by Dr Arthur Farnworth of the CSIRO.

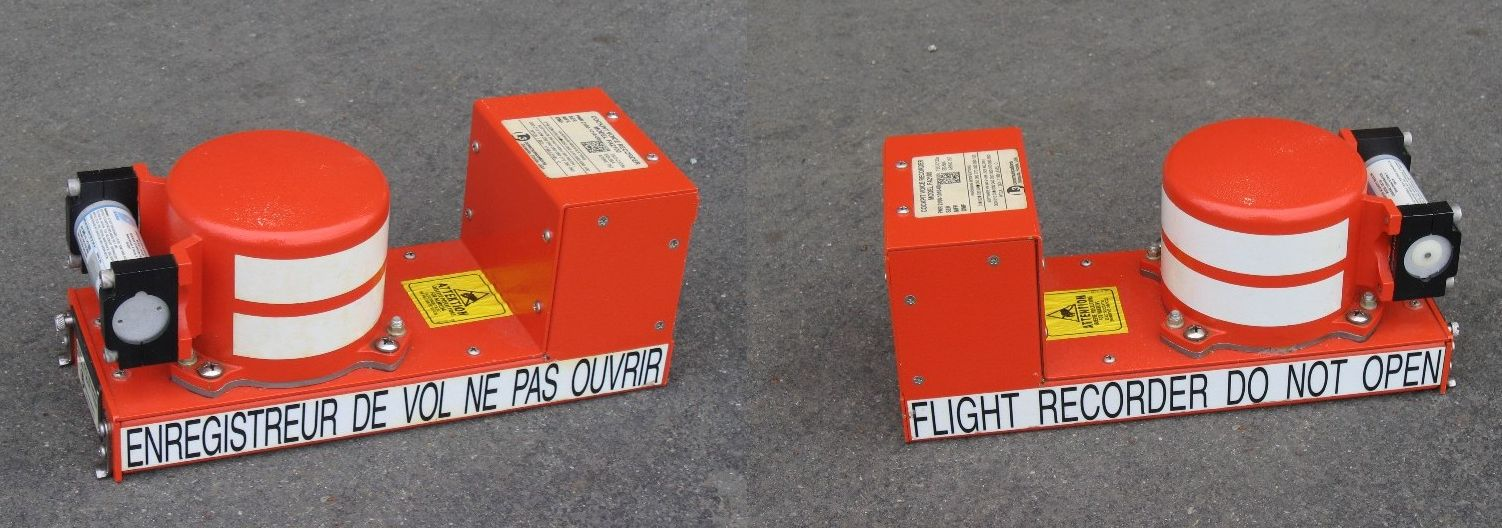
Cockpit voice recorder

1958 – Black box flight recorder – The 'black box' voice and instrument data recorder was invented by Dr David Warren in Melbourne.

1960s – Self constructing tower crane – Eric Favelle created the self-construct tower crane (also known as the kangaroo crane, self erecting crane or leaping crane). The crane hydraulically raises the tower, allowing another piece to be installed. It has been involved in the construction of many of the tallest building in Australia and Dubai including the Burj Khalifa and in many of the world's tallest buildings, including the World Trade Centre and its replacement the One World Trade Center in New York City and the Petronas Towers in Kuala Lumpur.

1960 – Plastic spectacle lenses – The world's first plastic spectacle lenses, 60 per cent lighter than glass lenses, were designed by Scientific Optical Laboratories in Adelaide (SOLA).

1961 – Medical ultrasound – David Robinson and George Kossoff's work at the Australian Department of Health, resulted in the first commercially practical water path ultrasonic scanner in 1961.

1963 – Rostrum camera – The first animation rostrum was commissioned by Graphik Animation, later known as Raymond Lea Animation in 1963. Designed and constructed by Jack Kennedy with the assistance of Jim Lynich, it was in operation by 1964.

1964 – Latex gloves – The Ansell company developed the worlds first latex gloves.

1965 – Inflatable escape slide – invented by Jack Grant of Qantas.

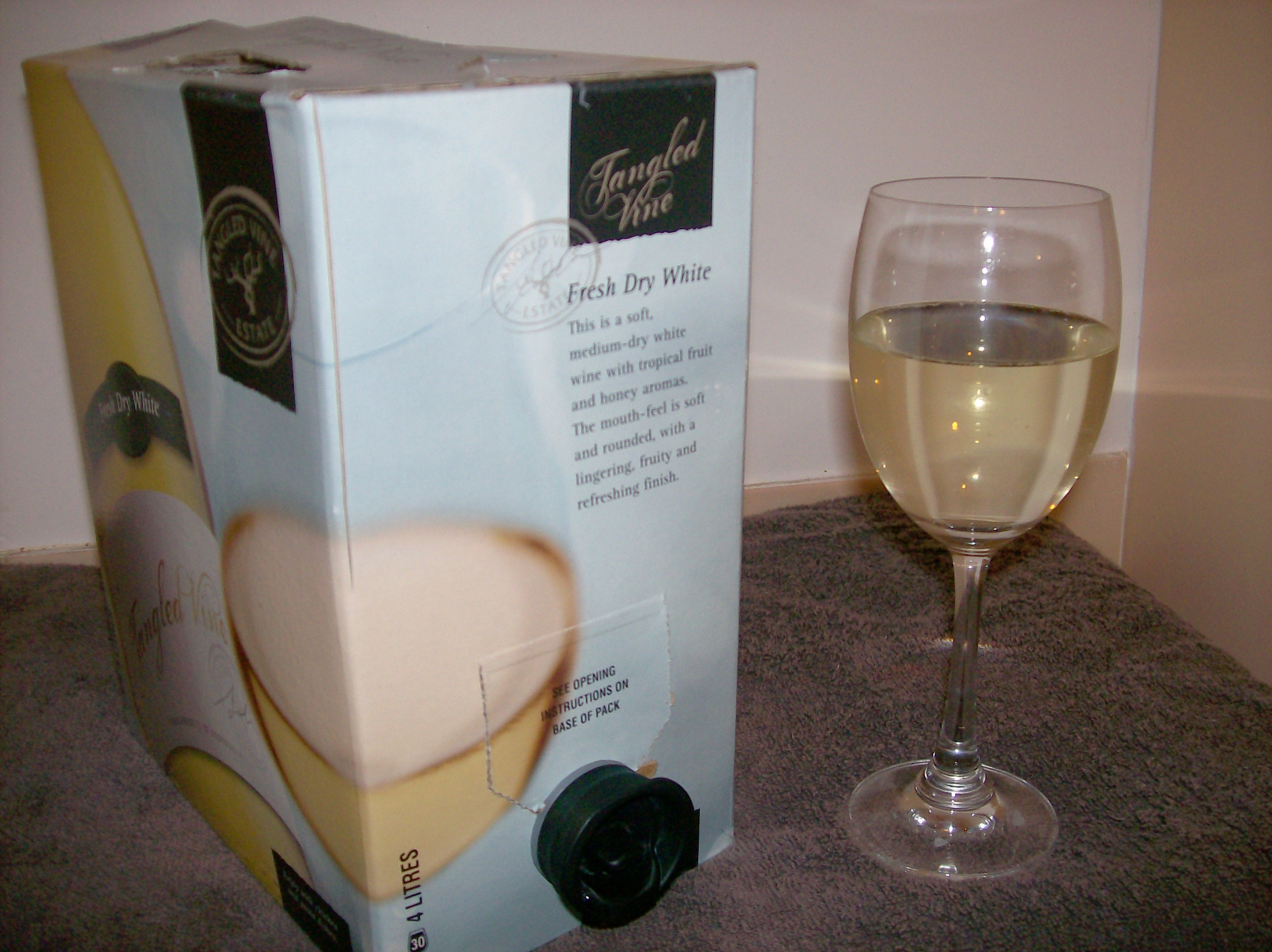
4L of Australian white wine

1965 – Wine cask – Invented by Thomas Angove of Renmark, South Australia, the wine cask is a cardboard box housing a plastic container which collapses as the wine is drawn off, thus preventing contact with the air. Angroves' original design with a resealable spout was replaced with a tap by the Penfolds wine company in 1972

1970 – Staysharp knife – The self-sharpening knife was developed by Wiltshire.

1971 – Variable rack and pinion steering – The variable ratio rack and pinion steering in motor vehicles allowing smooth steering with minimal feedback was invented by Australian engineer, Arthur Bishop.

1971 – Microwave Landing System – An all-weather, precision radio guidance system intended to be installed at large airports to assist aircraft in landing, including 'blind landings'. Microwave landing system (MLS) employs 5 GHz transmitters at the landing place which use passive electronically scanned arrays to send scanning beams towards approaching aircraft. An aircraft that enters the scanned volume uses a special receiver that calculates its position by measuring the arrival times of the beams. The project was called INTERSCAN and was developed by the Radio Physics Division of the Commonwealth Scientific and Industrial Research Organisation (CSIRO). It has since been accepted as the world standard technology for assisted landing since 1978 and is still being installed and used in airports around the world such as Heathrow Airport.

1972 – Orbital engine – The orbital internal combustion process engine was invented by engineer Ralph Sarich of Perth, Western Australia. The system uses a single piston to directly inject fuel into 5 orbiting chambers. It has never challenged the dominance of four-stroke combustion engines but has replaced many two-stroke engines with a more efficient, powerful and cleaner system. Orbital engines now appear in boats, motorcycles and small cars.

1972 – Instream analysis – To speed-up analysis of metals during the recovery process, which used to take up to 24 hours, Amdel Limited developed an on-the-spot analysis equipment called the In-Stream Analysis System, for the processing of copper, zinc, lead and platinum – and the washing of coal. This computerised system allowed continuous analysis of key metals and meant greater productivity for the mineral industry worldwide.

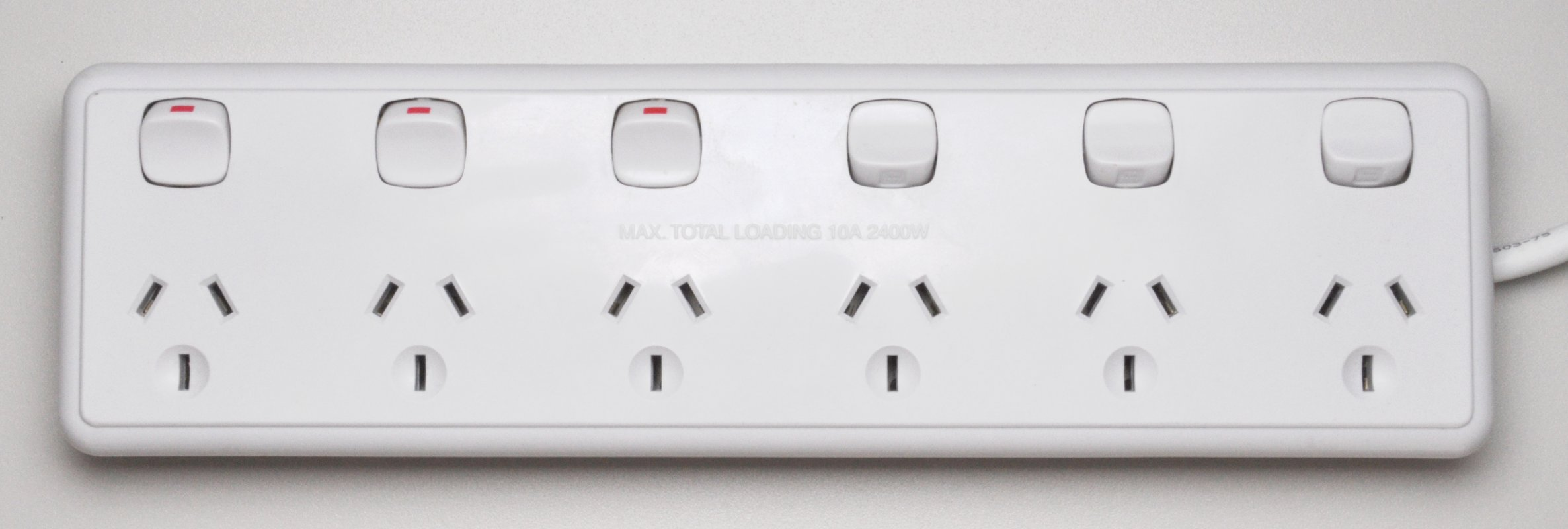
An Australian power board – one of many not manufactured by Kambrook

1972 – Power board – Peter Talbot, working under Frank Bannigan at Kambrook, invented the power board. This allows multiple electrical devices to be powered where only a single wall socket is available. This is a well-known example of failing to protect intellectual property. Kambrook was more interested in immediate commercial release than patenting its idea and has never received any royalties from this now ubiquitous product.

1973 – Sirosmelt lance and the ISASMELT process – The Sirosmelt lance was invented Dr Bill Denholm and Dr John Floyd at the CSIRO and by Mount Isa Mines (a subsidiary of MIM Holdings. The lance was developed to be an energy-efficient smelting process and improve the tin-smelting processes with the final process being called the ISASMELT process.

1974 – Super Sopper – Gordon Withnall at the age of 56 invented the Super Sopper, a giant rolling sponge used to quickly soak up water from sporting grounds so that play can continue.

1970 – Instant boiling water tap – Sydney company Zip Industries installed a boiling water tap fed by an under-sink pressurised cylinder, developing the point-of-use instant boiling water unit.

1976 – logMAR chart – The logMAR (Logarithm of the Minimum Angle of Resolution) chart was developed at the National Vision Research Institute of Australia and consists of rows of letters that is used by ophthalmologists, orthoptists, optometrists, and vision scientists to estimate visual acuity. It was designed to enable a more accurate estimate of acuity than other charts (e.g., the Snellen chart) and is recommended particularly in a research setting.

1977 – Laser airborne depth sounder (LADS) – The Laser airborne depth sounder is an aircraft-based hydrographic surveying system used by the Australian Hydrographic Service (AHS). The system uses the difference between the sea surface and the sea floor as calculated from the aircraft's altitude to generate hydrographic data. The Defence Science and Technology Organisation developed the LADS system.

1978 – Synroc – The synthetic ceramic Synroc that incorporates radioactive waste into its crystal structure was invented in 1978 by a team led by Dr Ted Ringwood at the Australian National University.

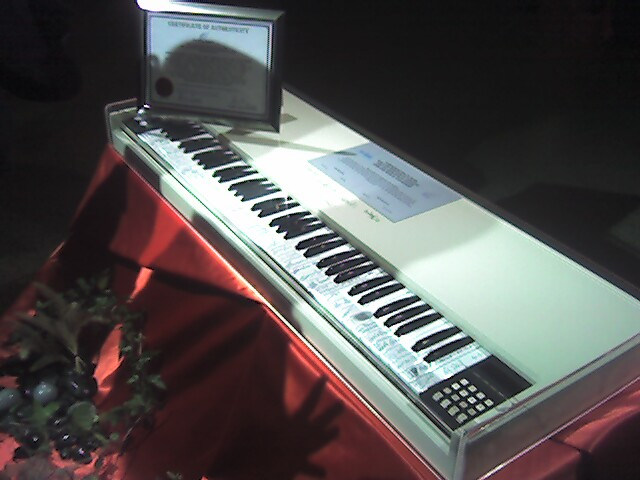
Fairlight CMI keyboard

1979 – Digital sampler – The Fairlight CMI (Computer Musical Instrument) was the first polyphonic digital sampling synthesizer. It was designed in 1979 by the founders of Fairlight, Peter Vogel and Kim Ryrie in Sydney, Australia.

1979 – RaceCam – Race Cam was developed by Geoff Healey, an engineer with the Australian Television Network now the Seven Network in Sydney. The tiny lightweight camera is used in sports broadcasts and provides viewers with spectacular views of events such as motor racing, which are impossible with conventional cameras.

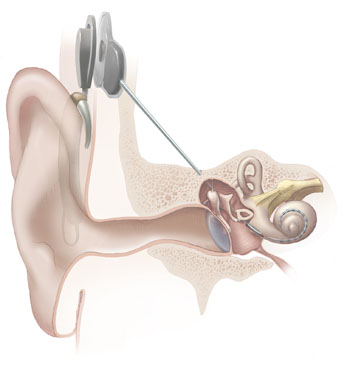
Illustration of internal parts of a cochlear implant

1979 – Bionic ear – The cochlear implant was invented by Professor Graeme Clark of the University of Melbourne.

1980 – Dual flush toilet – Bruce Thompson, working for Caroma in Australia, developed the Duoset cistern, with two buttons, and two flush volumes as a water-saving measure, now responsible for savings in excess of 32000 litres of water per household per year.

1980 – Sensitive high-resolution ion microprobe – The sensitive high-resolution ion microprobe (also sensitive high mass-resolution ion microprobe or SHRIMP) is a large-diameter, double-focusing secondary ion mass spectrometer (SIMS) sector instrument created at the Australian National University in Canberra.

1980 – Wave-piercing catamaran – The first high speed, stable catamarans were developed by Phillip Hercus and Robert Clifford of Incat in Tasmania.

1981 – Hovering rocket –The Hoveroc rocket was first flown on 2 May 1981 as a project carried out by Defence Science and Technology Group. It was the world's first practical hovering rocket.

1981 – CPAP mask – Professor Colin Sullivan of Sydney University developed the Continuous Positive Airflow Pressure (CPAP) mask. The CPAP system first developed by Sullivan has become the most common treatment for sleep disordered breathing. The invention was commercialised in 1989 by Australian firm ResMed, which is currently one of the world's two largest suppliers of CPAP technology.

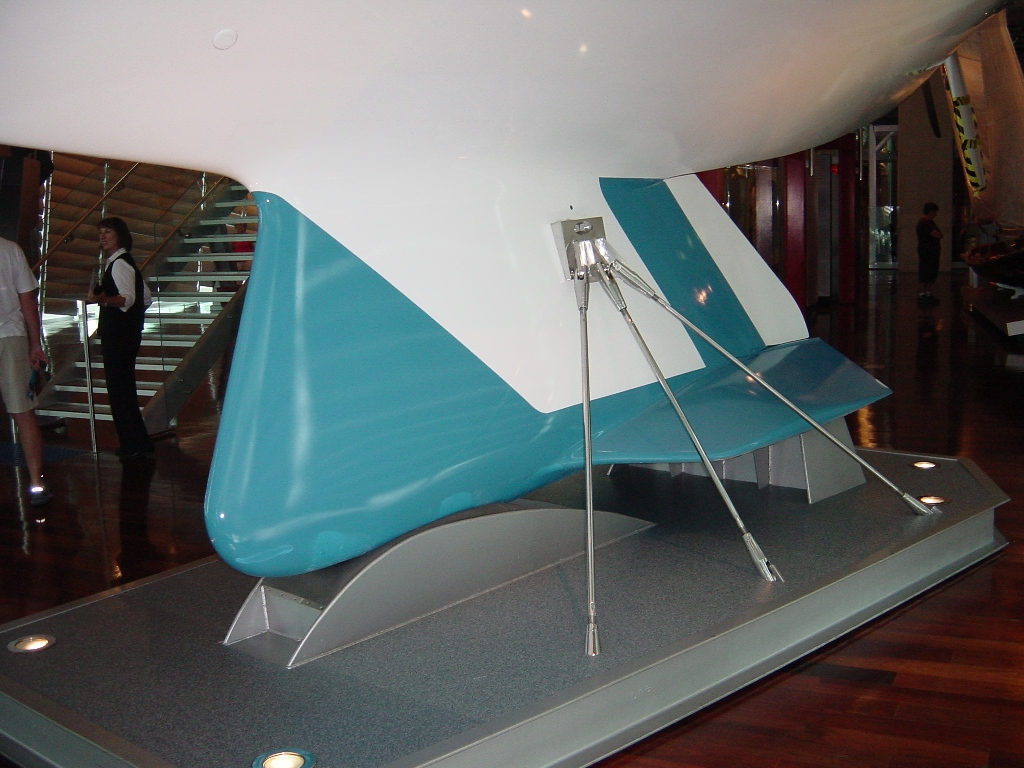
Winged keel of Australia II

1983 – Winged Keel – Ben Lexcen designed a winged keel that helped Australia II end the New York Yacht Club's 132-year ownership of the America's Cup. The keel gave the yacht better steering and manoeuvrability in heavy winds.

1983 – Foot rot vaccine – CSIRO produced the first vaccine against foot rot using genetic engineering techniques.

1984 – Frozen embryo baby - The world's first IVF (In vitro fertilisation) frozen embryo baby was born in Melbourne on 28 March 1984

1984 – Baby Safety Capsule – In 1984, for the first time babies had a bassinette with an air bubble in the base and a harness that distributed forces across the bassinette protecting the baby. New South Wales public hospitals now refuse to allow parents to take a baby home by car without one.

1984 – PB/5 ATPD – Audio-Tactile Pedestrian Detector, combining a two-rhythm buzzer, a vibrating touch panel, and braille direction arrow for safe pedestrian road crossing.

1985 – Technegas – Technegas is an inhalable aerosol radioactively labelled with the isotope 99mTc, and is employed in nuclear medicine imaging for lung ventilation scanning. Technegas lung scans in conjunction with lung perfusion scans demonstrate the presence of the life-threatening condition of pulmonary embolism. Technegas was invented in Australia by Dr Richard Fawdry and Dr Bill Burch.

1985 – Bronchitis vaccine – An oral vaccine (called Broncostat) to prevent bronchitis was developed by Professor Dr Robert Clancy at the University of Newcastle. It reduces attacks of acute bronchitis by up to 90%.

1986 – Gene shears – The discovery of gene shears was made by CSIRO scientists, Wayne Gerlach and Jim Haseloff. So-called hammerhead ribozymes are bits of genetic material that interrupt a DNA code at a particular point, and can be used to cut out genes that cause disease or harmful proteins.

1988 – Polymer banknote – The development of the polymer bank note was made by CSIRO scientists led by Dr. David Solomon. Securency Pty Ltd, a joint venture between the Reserve Bank of Australia (RBA) and UCB, brought the note into full production and polymer bank notes are now used in 30 countries besides Australia. The chief advantages are high counterfeiting resistance and longer circulation lifetimes.

1988 – Non-chemical biological pesticide – The world's first non-chemical biological pesticide was invented at the University of Adelaide.

1989 – Polilight forensic lamp – Ron Warrender and Milutin Stoilovic, forensic scientists at the Australian National University in Canberra, developed Unilite which could be set to just the right wavelength to show fingerprints up well against any background. Rofin Australia Pty Ltd, developed this product into the portable Polilight which shows up invisible clues such as fingerprints and writing that has been scribbled over, as well as reworked sections on paintings.

1991 – Buffalo fly trap – In 1991 the CSIRO developed a low-tech translucent plastic tent with a dark inner tunnel lined with brushes. When a cow walks through, the brushed flies fly upwards toward the light and become trapped in the solar-heated plastic dome where they quickly die from desiccation (drying out) and fall to the ground, where ants eat them.

1991 – Plastic rod bone repair – The technique of using plastic rods in place of metal pins and screws was developed by Dr Michael Ryan and Dr Stephen Ruff at Sydney's North Shore Hospital. Repairing bones with plastic rods stops interference with MRI and CAT scans. Several types of plastic screws are now used in orthopaedic surgery. Some are absorbed into the body, unlike metal screws, which often have to be surgically removed.

1991 – St Vincents heart valve – An artificial heart valve designed by Dr Victor Chang for the replacement of dysfunctional ventricle heart valves in people with chronic heart diseases at St Vincent's Hospital, Sydney.

1992 – Multi-focal contact lens – The world's first multi-focal contact lens was invented by optical research scientist, Stephen Newman in Queensland.

1992 – Spray-on skin – Developed by Dr Fiona Wood at Royal Perth Hospital

1992 – Product Activation – Patented by Ric Richardson of Sydney's northern beaches initially to allow digital distribution of his own software. Now the process is used by the majority of software publishers in the world.

1992 – Wi-Fi – CSIRO researchers patented a method to "unsmear" radio waves that echo off indoor surfaces. This breakthrough method led to the invention and patenting of wireless local area network (WLAN) technology and laid the technical foundation for what would become modern WiFi.

1993 – Underwater PC – The world's first underwater computer with a five-button hand-held keypad was developed by Bruce Macdonald at the Australian Institute of Marine Science.

1993 – Frazier lens – The Frazier lens is a special camera lens designed by Australian photographer Jim Frazier. The Frazier lens provides a massive depth of field, allowing the foreground and background of an image to be in focus. Frazier's lenses have been widely used in Hollywood and wildlife cinematography.

1993 – Asynchronous Transfer Mode – Asynchronous Transfer Mode (ATM) was the first fast packet communications technology simultaneously to support telephony (voice), data, and video signals in one network without the use of separate overlay networks.

1995 – EXELGRAM – The world's most sophisticated optical anti-counterfeiting technology was developed by the CSIRO.

1995 – Gene silencing – A CSIRO team led by Dr Peter Waterhouse discovered that double-stranded RNA was the trigger for RNA interference (RNAi) or gene silencing.

1995 – Jindalee Radar System – Developed by Scientists at the 'Defence scientists (DSTO), the Jindalee Radar System detects stealth aircraft and missiles by searching for the air turbulence generated by such vehicles.

1996 – Anti-flu Medication – Relenza was developed by a team of scientists at the Victorian College of Pharmacy at Monash University in Melbourne. The team was led by Mark von Itzstein in association with the CSIRO. Relenza was discovered as a part of the Australian biotechnology company Biota's project to develop antiviral agents via rational drug design.

1997 - Improved detector technology - Introduced to replace traditional channel multipliers, Australian company ETP Electron Multipliers in Sydney (later a division of Scientific Glass Engineering (SGE) founded in 1960 by Ernest Dawes in a Melbourne, and now part of IMI/Restek) transformed mass spectrometry detection by developing discrete-dynode technology paired with a highly sensitive high-energy conversion dynode (HED).

1997 - BPAY - the world's first single bill payment service adopted across a national banking sector.

== 21st century ==
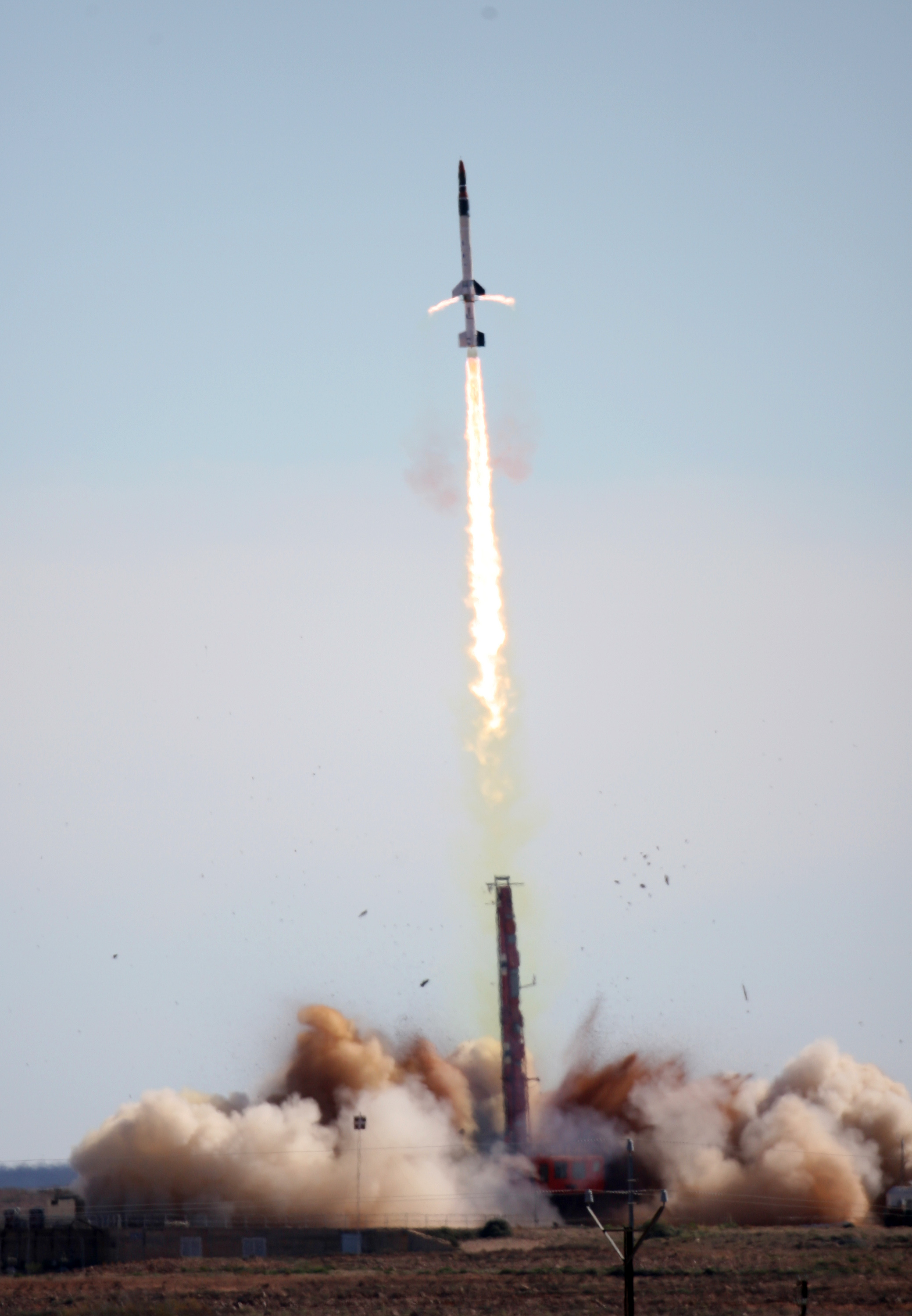
Hyshot trial-Phase 2

2003 – Blast Glass – invented by Peter Stephinson. It was effective in protecting the Australian Embassy in the Jakarta bombings of 2004.

2003 – UltraBattery – A hybrid energy storage device invented by the Commonwealth Scientific and Industrial Research Organisation (CSIRO). UltraBattery combines supercapacitor technology with lead-acid battery technology in a single cell with a common electrolyte. The supercapacitor enhances the power and lifespan of the lead-acid battery as it acts as a buffer during high-rate discharge and charge.

2003 - Expedition - Origin of Google Maps - Australian software engineers Stephen Ma and Noel Gordon, together with two Danish brothers Jens and Lars Rasmussen they hired, created a start up Where 2 Technologies. It developed a Windows, and later, web-based application for online mapping. After a demonstration to Larry Page, the team were hired by Google and the software became Google Maps in 2005.

2006 – Cervical Cancer Vaccine – Professor Ian Frazer from University of Queensland created a preventive care for cervical cancer. The commercial application, Gardasil, is a vaccine that works against certain types of human papillomavirus (HPV).

2010 – Robotic Visual Horizon – An automated system that allows unmanned aeroplanes to perform complex manoeuvres was adapted from the way a bee's brain processes visual information during flight by researchers and engineers at the Vision Centre, the Queensland Brain Institute and the School of Information Technology and Electrical Engineering at the University of Queensland.

2010 – Scrubba Wash Bag – flexible, lightweight washboard inside a waterproof bag, for hiking and offgrid clothes washing

2011 – Anti-Hacking Software Kernel – National ICT Australia (NICTA), and Open Kernel Labs (OK Labs) released the seL4 microkernel, a small operating system kernel which regulates access to a computer's hardware and is able to distinguish between trusted and untrusted software, allowing secure financial or secret data to be used on the same platform as everyday applications, protecting the secure data from hackers.

2012 – Hendra virus vaccine – CSIRO produced the first vaccine (called Equivac® HeV) to protect horses against the Hendra virus. The Hendra virus was first identified in horses in 1994 is a Bio-Safety Level-4 disease agent, which is the most dangerous level in the world.

2012 – Quantum bit – A team of Australian scientists built the first quantum bit, the basic unit of quantum computing, using a single phosphorus atom implanted into a silicon chip. Research leaders include Andrew Dzurak and Andrea Morello from the University of New South Wales – Sydney.

2013 – Blood test to prevent stillbirth – A Melbourne medical research institution, Mercy Health, identified a method of analysing RNA fragments in a mother's blood that indicates oxygen and nutrient deprivation in the foetus.

2015 – Quantum Logic Gate – Engineers at the University of New South Wales successfully built a Quantum Logic Gate using two qubits into silicon. Logic gates are the main idea behind computational theory, allowing qubits to be utilised for computation, paving the way for commercial applications.

2016-2018 – Concentric artificial surf generator pool – Aaron Trevis and the team he assembled as "Surf Lakes Holdings" created a plunger designed artificial wave maker, that sends out sets of waves, 360 degrees from the plunger, with the ability to vary the wave type

2018 – Modular self-fit hearing aid – Collaboration between Government of Victoria, RMIT University, Swinburne University of Technology and Professor Peter Blamey and Professor Elaine Saunders release the first hearing aid with a modular design allowing users with severe dexterity issues to self-manage their own hearing aids.
