= Anne de Chantraine =

French woman convicted of witchcraft (1605-1622)

Anne de Chantraine (Liège, c. 1603 – Warêt-la-Chaussée, 18 October 1622) was one of the many people to be killed during the witch trials in the early modern period, having first been incarcerated for over two and a half years and repeatedly tortured.

== Life and death ==
Anne was arrested on suspicion of witchcraft in the village of Warêt-la-Chaussée in March 1620, when aged 17. By her own account, she had been born in Liège, and after her mother died when she was two years old, her father, an itinerant hawker, placed her in a convent orphanage where she was taught reading, writing and needlework. At the age of 12 she left the orphanage and became a housemaid to Christiane de la Chéraille, who taught her to rub her body with oils to be transported to the Witches' Sabbath. The first time this happened, she made the sign of the cross and awoke locked in her mistress's cellar. Thereafter she got into the habit of attending the Sabbath three nights per week, on Wednesdays, Fridays and Saturdays, where she feasted, danced with other witches, copulated with demons, and worshipped Satan, who appeared to her sometimes as a goat and sometimes as "a man dressed in back, young and handsome". Her mistress's brother-in-law and lover, Laurent de Chamont, taught her and others how to enter locked spaces by magic in order to steal valuables. After his gang was discovered and broken up, Anne was condemned to banishment from the Principality of Liège. She had then made her way to Warêt-la-Chaussée, in the County of Namur, where her father was living, and found employment as a cowherd to a farmer in nearby Erpent.

After her initial interrogation, Anne was imprisoned in the local jail for six months while the magistrates sent someone to Liège to check her story. Their messenger returned with information that Christiane de la Chéraille and Laurent de Chamont had indeed been executed in Liège as witches, and that Anne's guilt was corroborated by Gaspard José, who had briefly employed her before her first arrest, and by Jean Agnus, another member of Chamont's gang. The trial resumed on 9 October. On 14 October three witnesses were heard, two from Warêt and one from Erpent. One testified that she had fallen ill after taking a single bite from a galette that Anne had prepared. Another testified that she had been friendly with Anne, who had confided in her about her experience of magic powders and witches' sabbaths, and claimed that Anne had first poisoned and then cured her child. The third declared under oath that Anne had cured two children of curses, but had caused the death of a third. Unsure how to proceed, the magistrates sent the clerk of the court to report to the provincial council in Namur for instructions, and were told that an expert would be sent to put Anne to the torture to discover more about her accomplices.

Anne's torture commenced on 5 December 1620, carried out by Léonard Balzat, the executioner sent from Namur. The following day, the magistrates were informed that she had revealed nothing of substance under torture but that, given what she had already confessed to, she should certainly be banished or worse. Apparently unable to agree upon her sentence, the magistrates questioned her again on 15 February 1621, when she explained how she was able to cure poisoned children by conjuring the devil, admitting to having taken money to do so. Balzat again put Anne to torture on 15 and 17 April and on 14 June, without getting her to name any further accomplices. On 16 June five witnesses were heard who had travelled from Liège to testify that she had robbed them of valuables or cash.

On 16 July 1621, the Council of Namur instructed the local magistrates to declare her guilty on the basis of her confessions and sentence her to death. When this was communicated to Anne on 23 July, she retracted her confessions and denied ever having practised sorcery. The magistrates communicated this to the provincial council, who on 26 July issued a revised death sentence. The magistrates delayed, and on 9 December were instructed by the council that it was their duty to pronounce and execute the sentence. A clergyman was appointed to hear Anne's confession, but she again denied any wrongdoing, and the magistrates were apparently still reluctant to put her to death.

In the summer of 1622, two new councillors were delegated to reexamine the case, and Anne was moved from the local jail in Warêt to the prison in Namur. In early September, the jailer was questioned as to her mental state and asserted that she sometimes talked nonsense but was sometimes lucid. On 27 September an exorcism was performed on her. On 17 October the council sentenced her to death by strangulation, her corpse to be consumed by fire, and she was transported back to Warêt the same day. Léonard Balzat carried out the sentence on 18 October 1622, first strangling her and then burning her corpse on a pyre that burned for two days.

== Commemoration ==
A commemorative event was held in Warêt in March 2026.

== In popular culture ==
Anne de Chantraine is a playable character in Nightmare/Atmosfear, a series of video board games. She is a witch in the series, and has so far appeared in all but two games. She was the host of the third installment of the series.

She is also the titular character in a historical novel, Gaston Compère's Anne de Chantraine ou la Naissance d'une ombre (La Renaissance du Livre, 2002). ISBN 978-2804606657
