= Horror and terror =

Literary and psychological concept

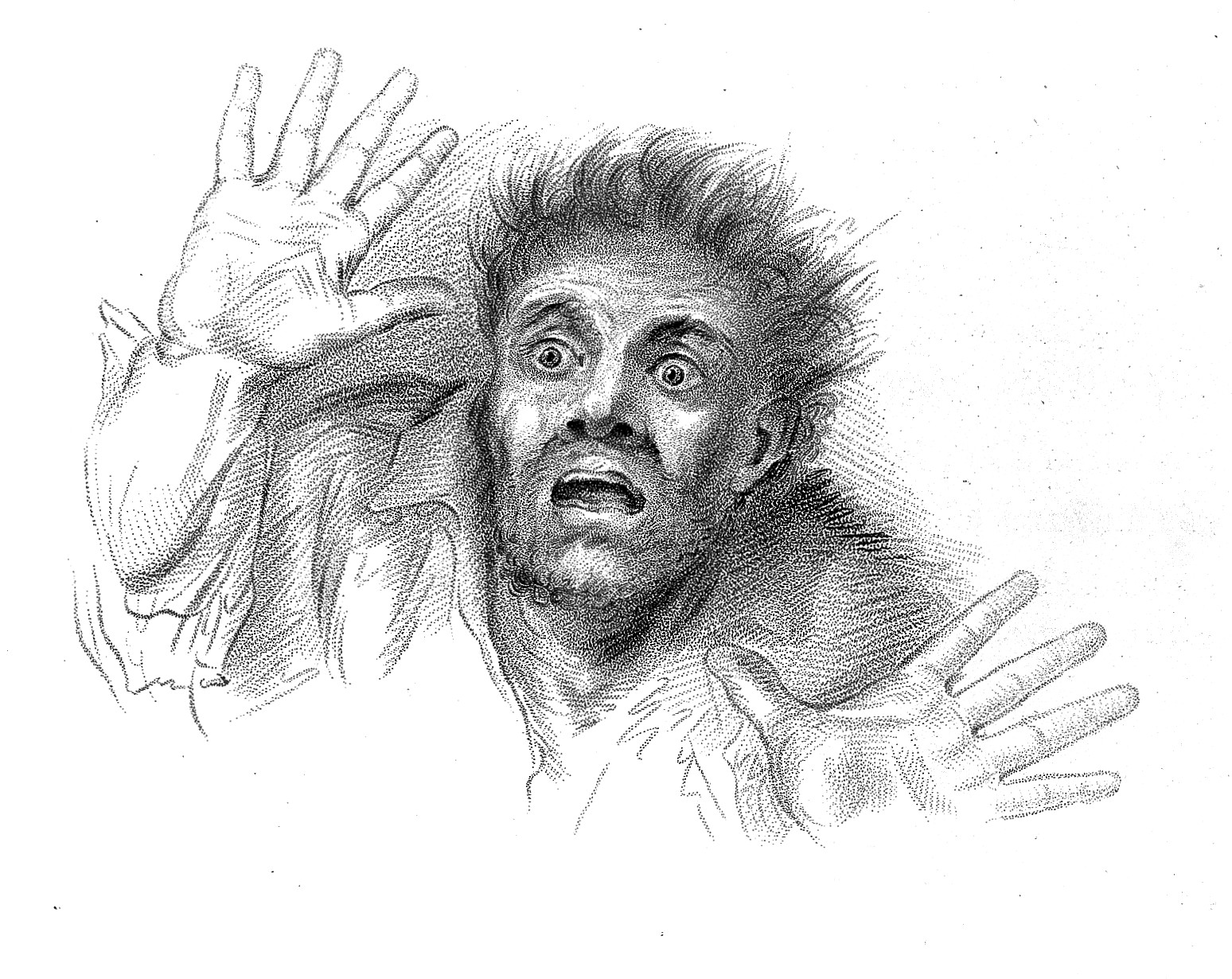
Drawing by Sir Charles Bell of a terrified man from Essays on Expression

The distinction between horror and terror is a standard literary and psychological concept applied especially to Gothic and horror fiction. Horror is the feeling of revulsion that usually follows a frightening sight, sound, or otherwise experience. By contrast, terror is usually described as the feeling of dread and anticipation that precedes the horrifying experience.

Noël Carroll also defined terror as a combination of horror and revulsion.

== Literary Gothic ==
The distinction between terror and horror was first characterized by the Gothic writer Ann Radcliffe (1764–1823), horror being more related to being shocked or scared (being horrified) at an awful realization or a deeply unpleasant occurrence, while terror is more related to being anxious or fearful. Radcliffe considered that terror is characterized by "obscurity" or indeterminacy in its treatment of potentially horrible events, something which leads to the sublime. She says in an essay published posthumously in 1826, 'On the Supernatural in Poetry', that terror "expands the soul and awakens the faculties to a high degree of life". Horror, in contrast, "freezes and nearly annihilates them" with its unambiguous displays of atrocity. She goes on: "I apprehend that neither Shakespeare nor Milton by their fictions, nor Mr Burke by his reasoning, anywhere looked to positive horror as a source of the sublime, though they all agree that terror is a very high one; and where lies the great difference between horror and terror, but in uncertainty and obscurity, that accompany the first, respecting the dreader evil."

According to Devendra Varma in The Gothic Flame (1966):

The difference between Terror and Horror is the difference between awful apprehension and sickening realization: between the smell of death and stumbling against a corpse.

== Horror fiction ==
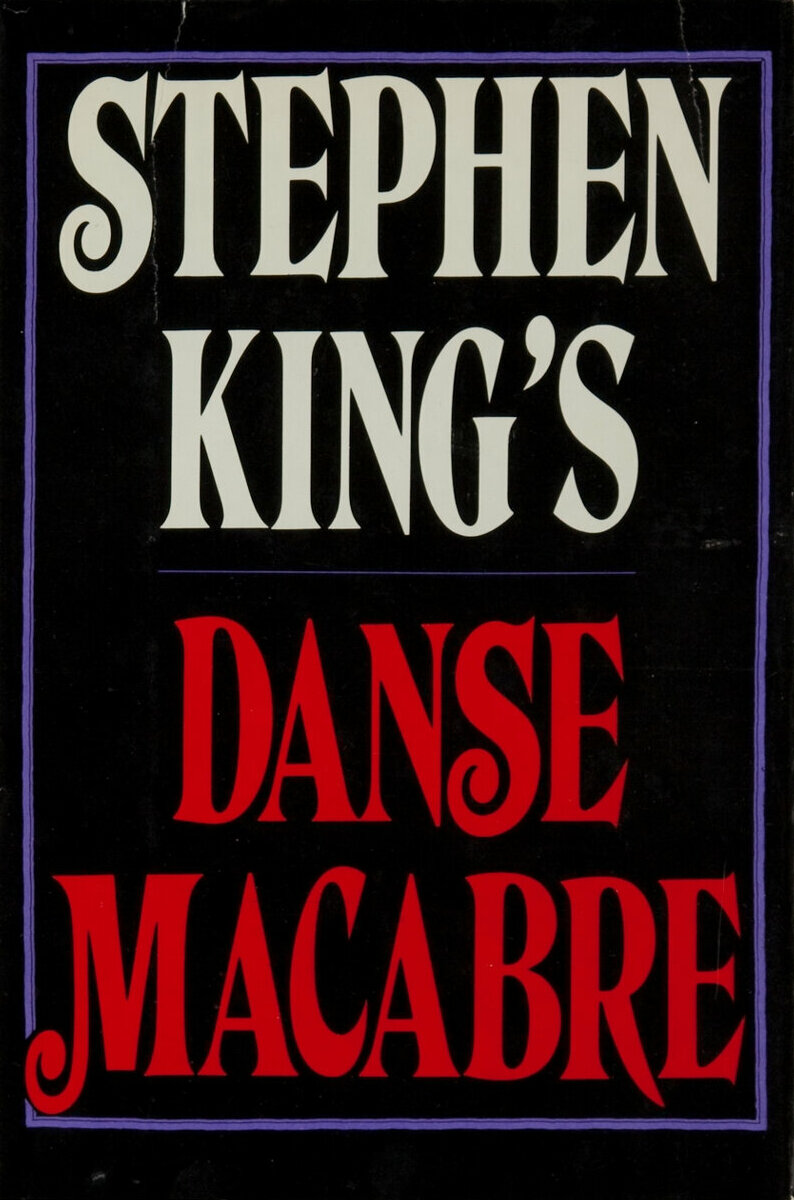
A 1981 non-fiction book Danse Macabre by Stephen King analyzes horror fiction in both literature and film.

Horror is also a genre of film and fiction that relies on horrifying images or situations to tell stories and prompt reactions or jump scares to put their audiences on edge. In these films the moment of horrifying revelation is usually preceded by a terrifying build up, often using the medium of scary music.

In his non-fiction book Danse Macabre, Stephen King stressed how horror tales normally chart the outbreak of madness/the terrible within an everyday setting. He also elaborated on the twin themes of terror and horror, adding a third element which he referred to as "revulsion". He describes terror as "the finest element" of the three, and the one he strives hardest to maintain in his own writing. Citing many examples, he defines "terror" as the suspenseful moment in horror before the actual monster is revealed. "Horror," King writes, is that moment at which one sees the creature/aberration that causes the terror or suspense, a "shock value". King finally compares "revulsion" with the gag-reflex, a bottom-level, cheap gimmick which he admits he often resorts to in his own fiction if necessary, confessing:

I recognize terror as the finest emotion and so I will try to terrorize the reader. But if I find that I cannot terrify, I will try to horrify, and if I find that I cannot horrify, I'll go for the gross-out. I'm not proud.

== Psychoanalytic views ==
Freud likened the experience of horror to that of the uncanny.

In his wake, Georges Bataille saw horror as akin to ecstasy in its transcendence of the everyday; as opening a way to go beyond rational social consciousness. Julia Kristeva in turn considered horror as evoking experience of the primitive, the infantile, and the demoniacal aspects of unmediated femininity.

== Horror, helplessness and trauma ==
The paradox of pleasure experienced through horror films/books can be explained partly as stemming from relief from real-life horror in the experience of horror in play, partly as a safe way to return in adult life to the paralysing feelings of infantile helplessness.

Helplessness is also a factor in the overwhelming experience of real horror in psychological trauma. Playing at re-experiencing the trauma may be a helpful way of overcoming it.

== See also ==
- Fantastic art
- Fear
- Medusa's Head
- Monster literature
- Nightmare
- Surrealism

== Bibliography ==
- Steven Bruhm (1994) Gothic Bodies: The Politics of Pain in Romantic Fiction. Philadelphia: University of Pennsylvania Press.
- Gary Crawford (1986) "Criticism" in J. Sullivan (ed) The Penguin Encyclopedia of Horror and the Supernatural.
- Ann Radcliffe (1826) "On the Supernatural in Poetry" in The New Monthly Magazine 7, 1826, pp 145–52.
- Devendra Varma (1966) The Gothic Flame. New York: Russell and Russell.
- Gina Wisker (2005) Horror Fiction: An Introduction. New York: Continuum.
- Angela Wright (2007) Gothic Fiction. Basingstoke: Palgrave.
- Julian Hanich (2010) Cinematic Emotion in Horror Films and Thrillers. The Aesthetic Paradox of Pleasurable Fear. New York: Routledge.
- Noël Carroll (1990) The Philosophy of Horror: Or, Paradoxes of the Heart. New York: Routledge.
