= Olga Briscorn =

Russian serial killer (1776–1836)

- Born: Olga Konstantinovna Mavrogeni; 1776; Russian Empire
- Died: 1836 (aged 59–60); Russian Empire
- Other name: "The Kursk Saltychikha"
- Conviction: Murder
- Penalty: Imprisoned in state custody

Details
- Victims: 128+
- Span of crimes: 1818–1822
- Country: Russian Empire
- States: Kursk, Yekaterinoslav, Saint Petersburg

Olga Konstantinovna Strukova Briscorn (née Mavrogeni; 1776 – 1836), nicknamed The Kursk Saltychikha, was a wealthy Russian landowner and socialite, as well as torturer and serial killer of her own serfs, who operated in the Kursk, Yekaterinoslav, and Saint Petersburg Governorates. She owned households in the capital, and other estates in Pyataya Gora, Prilepy, and Khomutovka.

== Biography ==
Olga Konstantinovna Strukova, born in 1776 in the family of a wealthy landowner, came from the well-known Mavrogeni family, who were Moldovan boyars.

She married Ananiy Gerasimovich Strukov, the provincial marshal of nobility and the wealthiest man in the province, receiving a substantial dowry of 56,000 rubles, extensive land and households, and several hundred slaves. Following this advantageous marriage, Olga Strukova became a prominent figure among the Yekaterinoslav elite. In her early thirties, well-educated and witty, she was also deeply interested in theatre and amateur performances.

Soon after her husband's death, the widow moved to St. Petersburg, but did not mourn for long - only a year later, she married a major official, senator and diplomat named Fyodor Maximovich Briscorn. Strukova then began living a double life: in St. Petersburg, she posed as a model of piety, in whose metropolitan house on Galernaya Street, the family of the great poet Alexander Pushkin lived for some time; however, in the Yekaterinoslav, "Senator Briscorn" became known for something completely different.

== Abuse of peasants ==
In 1817, the 40-year-old Briscorn bought an estate in the Dmitrievsky district of the Kursk Governorate. Many serfs were transferred to the estate, and in just a year, she ordered a cloth factory be built in the village of Prilepy. The factory was unique on the technical side, with the weaving machines being bought from abroad, and a steam engine, the first in the Central Black Earth economic region, were set in motion.

Her "glory" did not come from this, however, but from the fact that she constantly punished both adults and minors who worked in her factory. In a short time, the material situation of the serfs worsened, and the mortality rate increased. In 1822, local farmers turned towards Emperor Alexander I, whose official, yet secret, investigation lasted 3 years.

The landowner was convicted of torturing her serfs by beating them with whips, bats and sticks, as well as starving them to death. She forced the peasants who built the factory to work on holidays and in their "own days", which is why they did not have time to cultivate their own land. When people were assigned to her factory, Briscorn would take away their property and order them to live in the machine room. In 1820, the factory's salary was doubled, with Briscorn keeping most of the money for food and clothing. From October 1820 to May 1821, 121 workers died of starvation, disease and injuries, of which 44 were under the age of 15; 74 of them were buried by the priest, while the rest were buried in pits. During this period, more than 300 people fled the estate. According to the results of the investigation, fraudulent operations concerning the products were also revealed, and Briscorn (already a widow by this time), was removed from ownership of the Prilepy factory, which was taken under state guardianship.

In total, the factory employed 379 people, about 90 of whom were children from seven years and older. The working day was 14–15 hours long, with the serfs having to sleep on straw in the workshop.

The food was extremely modest:

- bread with cake
- cabbage soup
- a spoonful of porridge
- wormy meat that, when divided among all, added up to only 8 grams per person.

Life wasn't any easier for those who worked the land, as they were forced to work on Briscorn's land exclusively. As a result, serfs were unable to grow crops of their own, and often starved along with their families.

=== Patronage ===
Despite her notoriety, the Kursk Saltychikha was also famous for her piety and patronage of the arts: she built large temples and churches, and granted alms to the poor. In the village of Pyataya Gora, the church built by Briscorn in 1826 has been preserved to this day.

== Family and children ==
Olga Konstantinovna's first marriage was to the rich Yekatinoslav marshal of nobility Ananiy Gerasimovich Strukov. Three children were produced from this marriage:

- Pyotr Ananyevich Strukov (1803–1881) - a rich man, major general and leading figure in the noble circles of the Yekaterioslav Governorate.
- Emmanuil Ananyevich Strukov - a big landowner, poruchik and owner of the Strukov mansion.
- Elizaveta Ananyevich Strukova;

The second marriage was to a large landowner and diplomat Fyodor Maximovich von Briscorn (13 June 1760 — 1824). Two children were produced from this marriage:

- Olga Fyodorovna Potemkina (22 March 1808 — 21 May 1852), honoured maid of the court, widow of adjutant general Y. A. Potemkin; her second marriage for the adjutant general, general of the cavalry and Ober-Stallmeister E. F. Meyendorf. Eight children were born in this marriage.
- Elizaveta Fyodorovna Briscorn (1810–1896), married statesman Alexei Iraklyevich Levshin, bringing a huge dowry for her husband, as she owned the estates in Pyataya Gora and Khomutovka. According to her contemporaries, she was a good and pleasant woman, but not very beautiful. Three children were born from this marriage.

The children were left a rich legacy: homes in St. Petersburg; 52,000 acres of land; 110,000 rubles and three thousand serfs.

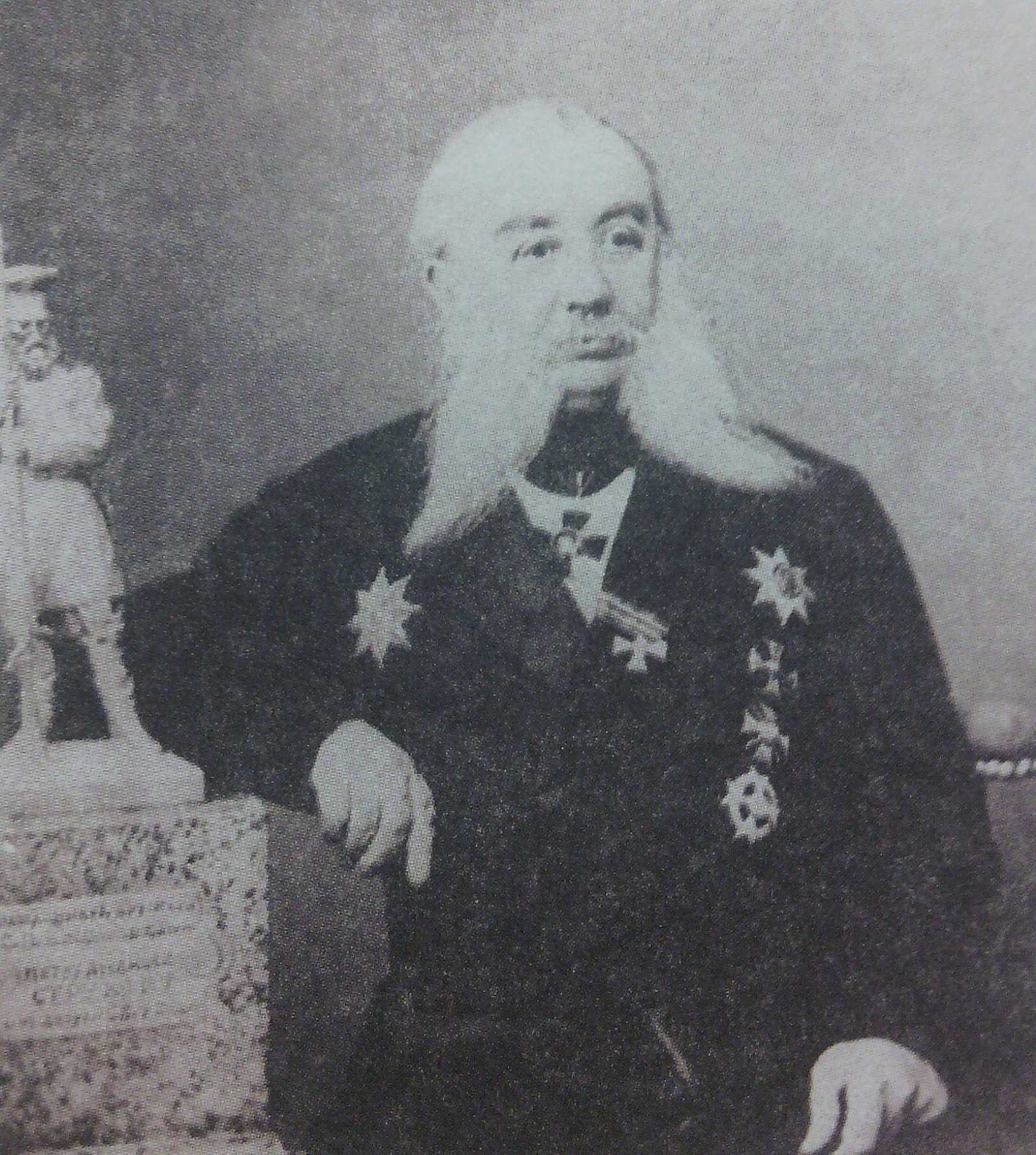
Pyotr Ananyevich Strukov, son

== See also ==
- Darya Nikolayevna Saltykova
- Elizabeth Brownrigg
- Delphine LaLaurie
- Elizabeth Báthory
- Kateřina of Komárov
- List of Russian serial killers
