= Kateřina of Komárov =

Czech noblewoman and serial killer

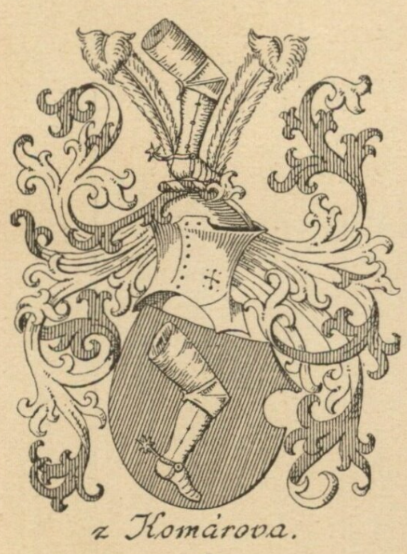
- Born: Unknown; Komárov, Bohemia
- Died: 15 March 1534; Prague, Bohemia
- Cause of death: Starvation
- Conviction: Murder
- Penalty: Exile

Details
- Victims: 14–30
- Country: Bohemia
- Date apprehended: 1533

Kateřina of Komárov (died 15 March 1534) was a Czech noblewoman and convicted murderer. She was infamous for the rumours of her mistreatment of the serfs on the estates of her spouse, which she tended during his absences. She was brought to trial in 1533 and convicted for the murder of 14 people, though she was allegedly the murderer of 30 people. She was sentenced to imprisonment in a tower in Prague Castle.

== Life ==
Kateřina was born to a family of small-time landowners in Komárov, Kunata Pesik and Katerina of Vrba. Her eventual rise to power began once she married her husband Jan Bechyně of Lažany, the burgrave of Karlštejn, who resided in Pičín and Příbram. Since the Bechyně of Lažany family was a vastly more important one, the wedding between Kateřina and Jan meant a big social rise for the former. Since Jan held his office in Karlštejn, the administration of his private estate was led by his wife. This proved a tough time for her serfs because Kateřina imposed severe punishments on them. Some of the tortured ones couldn't endure and died, and those who survived carried the consequences for the rest of their lives.

== Trial ==
Jan Bechyně had long held a protracted disagreement with the Dean of the Karlštejn Chapter, Wenceslaus Hajek, who later became a respected chronicler. Rumours of Kateřina's crimes eventually reached the Dean, and he informed her husband about them, but Jan took it as a provocation and sued Hajek. The court tribunal, chaired by Vojtěch I of Pernštejn, decided to examine the claims in Pičín in 1533. However, the summoned witnesses of the Pičín serfs, afraid of being punished, described Kateřina as a kind and good lady in the official interrogations. That was until they reached a citizen of Prague, a relative of one of the victims (since he was from Prague, which was out of Kateřina's jurisdiction, he could not be harmed). He named the cruel woman as the killer of his relatives, and his example encouraged many other serfs, who changed their testimonies in accordance with the truth. Kateřina eventually admitted to killing 14 of her serfs, but some of her servants suggested her victim count could be up to 30.

== Judgment and death ==
The court tribunal passed an unusual sentence for Czech law – Kateřina was to be imprisoned and left in jail to her fate, basically left alone so she could starve to death. She was placed in the Mihulka Tower at Prague Castle, where she died in March 1534. Two days after her death, her judge Vojtěch I of Pernštejn also died. This has been the subject of speculation, with claims that Kateřina had "dragged him down with her."

For Jan Bechyně, the tragic case of his wife's crimes had little effect on his life. After some time, he was appointed a high scribe and retained his position until his death in 1547.

On Friday before the Candlemas, Mrs. Kateřina Bechyňová was sentenced to death, because she killed several girls; later, having died, she was removed from so-called Mihulka's prison. — Memoirs from Mikuláš Dačický of Heslov

== See also ==
- List of serial killers by country
- Elizabeth Bathory
- Elizabeth Branch
- Elizabeth Brownrigg
- Delphine LaLaurie
- Catalina de los Ríos y Lisperguer
- Darya Nikolayevna Saltykova
- Mariam Soulakiotis
