= Elizabeth Branch =

British murderer

Elizabeth Branch (1672 – 3 May 1740) was an English murderer. She and her daughter had a reputation for violence, especially towards their servants. In February 1740, the pair decided that their maid had been loitering on an errand and beat the servant to death. They buried the girl, claiming she died of natural causes, but the body was exhumed. The pair were tried for murder at the Somerset assizes, with the jury delivering a guilty verdict without even retiring. Elizabeth and her daughter were hanged at Ilchester on 3 May 1740.

== Early life ==
Elizabeth Parry was born in 1672 in Bristol, the youngest daughter of the family. Her father was a ship's surgeon, earning his fortune as shipmaster. She married Benjamin Branch, a landholding farmer, and her father gave the couple a dowry of £2000 (equivalent to £350,000 in 2025), which supplemented Branch's income of £300 per year (equivalent to £52,000 in 2025)

== Cruelty to servants ==
Elizabeth quickly gained a reputation for violence. She and her daughter, Betty Branch (listed as Mary Branch in the Newgate Calendar), would torture small animals, apparently taking inspiration from stories of Nero. They often beat and humiliated their servants, especially after the death of Benjamin in 1730, so much so that soon no local persons were willing to serve them.

== Murder and trial ==
On 13 February 1740, as witnessed by Anne James (listed as Ann Somers in the Newgate Calendar), the dairymaid, Elizabeth sent her 13-year-old serving maid Jane Buttersworth on an errand to a nearby farm. On her return, Elizabeth and Betty, irate at how long she had taken, beat her for almost seven hours until she died. They buried her secretly, claiming that she had died of natural causes, but enough suspicion was aroused that locals exhumed her body. They brought it to the local surgeon who examined the body and found wounds which would have "kill'd the stoutest man". Elizabeth and Betty were tried for murder on 31 March at the Somerset assizes. The jury returned a guilty verdict without retiring to deliberate, and the two women were hanged at Ilchester on 3 May before six in the morning to reduce the possibility of an angry mob.

== See also ==
- Elizabeth Brownrigg
- Kateřina of Komárov
- Delphine LaLaurie
- La Quintrala
- Darya Nikolayevna Saltykova
