= St. Vladimir Cathedral =

St. Vladimir Cathedral or St. Volodymyr Cathedral may refer to:

- St. Volodymyr's Ukrainian Orthodox Cathedral (Toronto), Canada
- St. Vladimir's Cathedral, Paris, France
- St. Vladimir's Cathedral (Saint Petersburg), Russia
- St. Vladimir's Cathedral, Chersonesus, Ukraine
- St Volodymyr's Cathedral, Kyiv, Ukraine
- St. Vladimir's Cathedral, Sevastopol, Ukraine
- St. Vladimir's Cathedral (Stamford, Connecticut), United States

== See also ==
- St Vladimir's Church, Moscow, Russia
