= Zdeněk Salzmann =

Czech anthropologist, linguist and university educator (1925–2021)

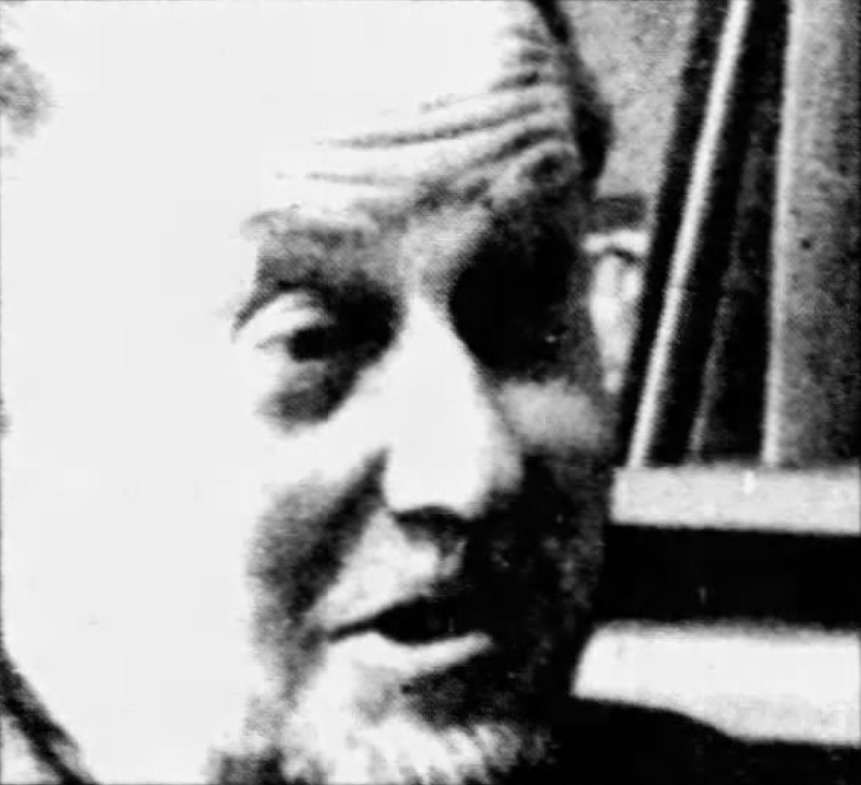
Newspaper photograph of Zdenek Salzmann from 1981

Zdeněk Salzmann (October 18, 1925 – May 10, 2021) was a Czech-American linguist, anthropologist, and folklorist. From 1968 to 1989, he was a professor at the University of Massachusetts Amherst, and he held the position of an emeritus professor there until his death in 2021.

== Life and education ==
Born in Prague, Czechoslovakia, Salzmann completed primary and secondary school there and later studied at Charles University. He lived in the United States after emigrating in 1947. He began studying at Indiana University Bloomington in 1948. While studying there, he met Joy McCollum. He married McCollum in 1949, and they were married for the rest of their lives.

== Career and scholarship ==
Salzmann's primary discipline was linguistic anthropology. He studied linguistics at Indiana University in Bloomington. From 1956 to 1966 he taught at, and later became director of, the Verde Valley School in Sedona, Arizona. In 1968, he began lecturing at University of Massachusetts Amherst in cultural and social anthropology, where he held academic positions until his death.

Based on his doctoral work at Indiana, he published a version of his thesis "A Sketch of Arapaho Grammar” in 1963.

One of Salzmann's primary research sites was with the Arapaho tribe on the Wind River Reservation in Wyoming. Amongst the Arapaho, he studied language loss and contributed to language preservation and renewal. Salzmann's significant contributions to Arapaho language include an English-Arapaho dictionary, grammar, as well as scholarly publications. Salzmann also studied and published about the community of Komárov in Central Bohemia.

After 1989, he regularly visited Czechoslovakia and later the Czech Republic, and lectured at universities in Prague, Plzeň, and Pardubice.

Many of Salzmann's research notes, data, and publications are held at the American Heritage Center archives at the University of Wyoming.

Salzmann died on May 10, 2021 in Sedona, Arizona.

== Selected publications ==
Salzmann authored publications in linguistic anthropology, ethnography, and studies of Czech language. The following selected list is divided by main language of publication.

- Jazyk, kultura a společnost: Úvod do lingvistické antropologie [Language, Culture, and Society: Introduction to Linguistic Anthropology] (in Czech)
- The Arapaho Language alphabet: Utilizing the Zdenek Salzmann System (Ethete, Wyoming, Wind River Reservation, 1993)
- Komárov: A Czech farming village (New York: Rinehart and Winston, 1974)
- Zdeněk Salzmann & Vladimír Scheufler, Komarov (Waveland Press, 1986), translation of 1974 version, noted by the Society for the Anthropology of Europe (SAE).
