= Ekaterini Dimetrea =

Executed Greek serial killer

- Born: 1920; Neochori, Lefktro, Greece
- Died: April 10, 1965 (aged 44–45); Goudi, Athens, Greece
- Cause of death: Execution by firing squad
- Other names: "The Poisoner of Mani" "Dragon of Mani" "The Hyena of Hell"
- Known for: Last woman to be executed in Greece
- Status: Executed
- Conviction: Murder (4 counts)
- Penalty: Death

Details
- Victims: 4
- Span of crimes: May – September 1962
- Country: Greece
- State: Messenia
- Date apprehended: September 10, 1962

Ekaterini Dimetrea (Greek: Αικατερίνη Δημητρέα; 1920 – April 10, 1965), known as The Poisoner of Mani (Greek: δηλητηριάστρια της Μάνης), was a Greek serial killer who fatally poisoned four family members with parathion from May to September 1962. After her arrest, she confessed to the killings and claimed that she intended to poison her entire village out of personal spite, because she had allegedly been mistreated by them. As a result, Dimetrea was convicted and sentenced to death for each murder, for which she was subsequently executed in 1965. She was the last woman to be executed in Greece.

== Early life ==
Little is known of Ekaterini Dimetrea's life. Born in 1920 in the small village of Neochori, Lefktro, she was one of several children from a rural family. At some point in her life, she married and had a daughter, but later divorced her husband and struggled financially as a result, surviving on a 200 drachma welfare check. According to her own claims, Dimetrea was disliked by her family, with her mother constantly pestering her to leave the house while her brother verbally and sometimes physically abused her. This was further complicated by the fact that she suffered from partial hemiparesis, which caused her left leg and arm to be weaker than the other. Despite these alleged abuses, Dimetrea was regarded as a normal and calm woman who could do no harm to those around her.

== Murders ==
On May 27, 1962, Dimetrea was doing some chores around the house when she was suddenly visited by her mother, 80-year-old Stefoula Loukarea. In what appeared to be a friendly gesture, she offered to serve her a plate of spaghetti, with the latter unaware that it had been laced with parathion. Almost immediately after consuming the meal, Loukarea had a seizure, had convulsions and complained of abdominal pain before ultimately succumbing to the poison. An autopsy concluded that her death was the result of a heart attack, but no suspicions were raised at the time since she had had chronic heart problems.

On July 19, she repeated the act with her 40-year-old cousin, Potoula Tsilogonea, whom she had invited over for some coffee. Like the previous victim, she suffered from convulsions and accidentally hit her head on the floor, causing a massive skull fracture in the process. The subsequent autopsy erroneously attributed the cause of death to be from this very same fracture, and the woman's death was deemed as an accident, without any investigation into what had led to it in the first place.

A few days later, Dimetrea invited her brother, 45-year-old Konstantinos Lucareas, to come visit her and treat him to some coffee. After the visit, Lucareas felt ill and collapsed on the road, whereupon fellow villagers brought him to the hospital, where he was treated for a gastric lavage. Lucareas eventually recovered, but not long after his release, he was invited to have a meal at his sister's house yet again on August 6. This time, Dimetrea treated him to some eggs poisoned with parathion, with the result being the successful poisoning of Lucareas. At the subsequent autopsy, the cause of death was ruled as a "heart attack resulting from problems with the gallbladder." The sudden deaths made many of the locals believe that a curse had befallen the family, resulting in more attention being paid to them.

On September 6, tragedy struck again when Dimetrea's 5-year-old nephew, Elias Pitsoula, started foaming at the mouth after being eating a Turkish delight given to him by her. The boy died on the way to the hospital in Kalamata, and due to the sudden nature of his death and the fact that he had no prior health issues, it raised great suspicion. A subsequent autopsy found a lethal quantity of parathion in his stomach, leading coroners from the toxicology laboratory in Athens to conclude that the boy had been poisoned. The previous three victims' bodies were also exhumed and examined, with all three showing traces of parathion in them.

== Arrest and confessions ==
Four days after Elias' death, Dimetrea went to the village's mayor and admitted to the poisonings, claiming that she done them to enact revenge on her family members for mistreating her. Not long after, she was arrested by the gendarmes at the local church and then guided them to where she kept her stash of parathion and mercury, with the latter being her original pick for the murders. During police interviews, she claimed that she had also attempted to poison her brother's wife and her 4-year-old niece Anthoula Thomea, but was unsuccessful since they did not accept her offers of pomegranates. Most shockingly, Dimetrea also claimed that she intended to poison the food and drinks at her brother's funeral, with the intent of potentially killing a majority of the village's population. Soon after her confessions, Dimetrea was transferred to a high-security prison in Kalamata, as authorities feared that she could be lynched by other villagers.

== Trial and execution ==
News of the case spread around the national and international media due to its sensational claims, some of which led people to believe that Dimetrea was mentally unsound. As a result, she was ordered to undergo a psychiatric evaluation at the Public Psychiatric Hospital in Dafni. The results of the examination concluded that she was of below average intelligence and possibly suffered from some sort of neurological issue, but was nonetheless diagnosed as sane at the time of the crimes. Due to this, the investigators and the prosecutor suggested that the real motive for the killings was that she would inherit her mother's house, and the confessions were just a ploy to portray her as an insane person.

As a result, she was put on trial for the four murders at the courthouse in Nafplio. During the court proceedings, the prosecutor called her a "hyena of hell" who methodically planned and executed each of her victims, while Dimetrea herself claimed that she could not remember what she had done. On May 8, 1963, Dimetrea was found guilty on four counts of murder and two counts of attempted manslaughter. As a result, she was given four death sentences for each murder plus 15 years for the remaining charges. All of her appeals were unsuccessful, and in the early morning hours on April 10, 1965, she was executed via firing squad at the shooting range in Goudi. She was the last woman to be executed in the country prior to the abolition of capital punishment.

== Book ==
In June 2022, author Panagiotis Giannouleas released a book titled Four times to death! The poisoner of Mani, where he details Dimetrea's crimes.

== See also ==
- List of serial killers by country
- Mariam Soulakiotis
