= Ivanovsky Convent =

Monastery in Moscow, Russia

Coordinates: 55°45′17″N 37°38′24″E

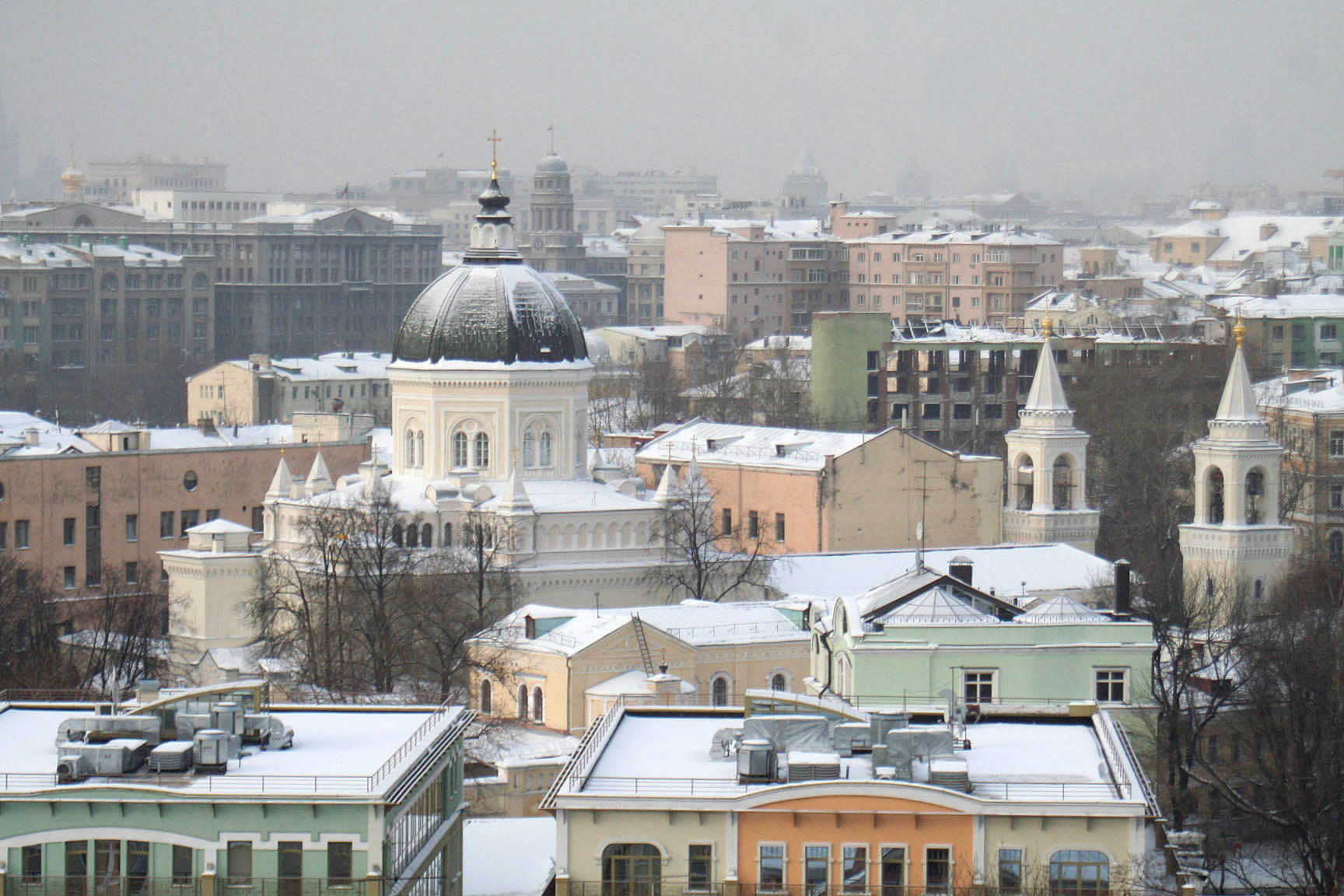
View toward Kitai-gorod. Across from the main entrance stands the Prince Vladimir Church.

Ivanovsky Convent (Russian: Ивановский монастырь, romanized: Ivanovskiy monastyr') is a large stauropegic Russian Orthodox convent in central Moscow, inside the Boulevard Ring, to the west of Kitai-gorod, in the district formerly known as Kulishki. It is the main shrine of St. John the Baptist in the Russian capital.

The monastery was first documented in 1604 and long served as a prison for ladies of royal and noble blood. Among the famous nuns were Dosiphea, alleged to be the same person as Princess Tarakanova, and the serial killer Darya Saltykova. In the 1730s, there were rumors that many nuns took part in khlysty rituals; the mother superior was found guilty and sentenced to die.

The 1812 Fire of Moscow reduced the monastery to ashes. The nunnery was closed down and the grounds stood empty until the 1860s, when Mikhail Bykovsky designed a new monastery compound. The domed katholikon, loosely based on Brunelleschi's works, is connected by covered passageways to other buildings. The grounds are thus divided into four lots.

After the Russian Revolution the nunnery was disbanded and was not revived until 2002. The buildings have served a variety of purposes; some are still occupied by the Moscow Oblast archives and a police high school.
