= Pičín =

- Municipality
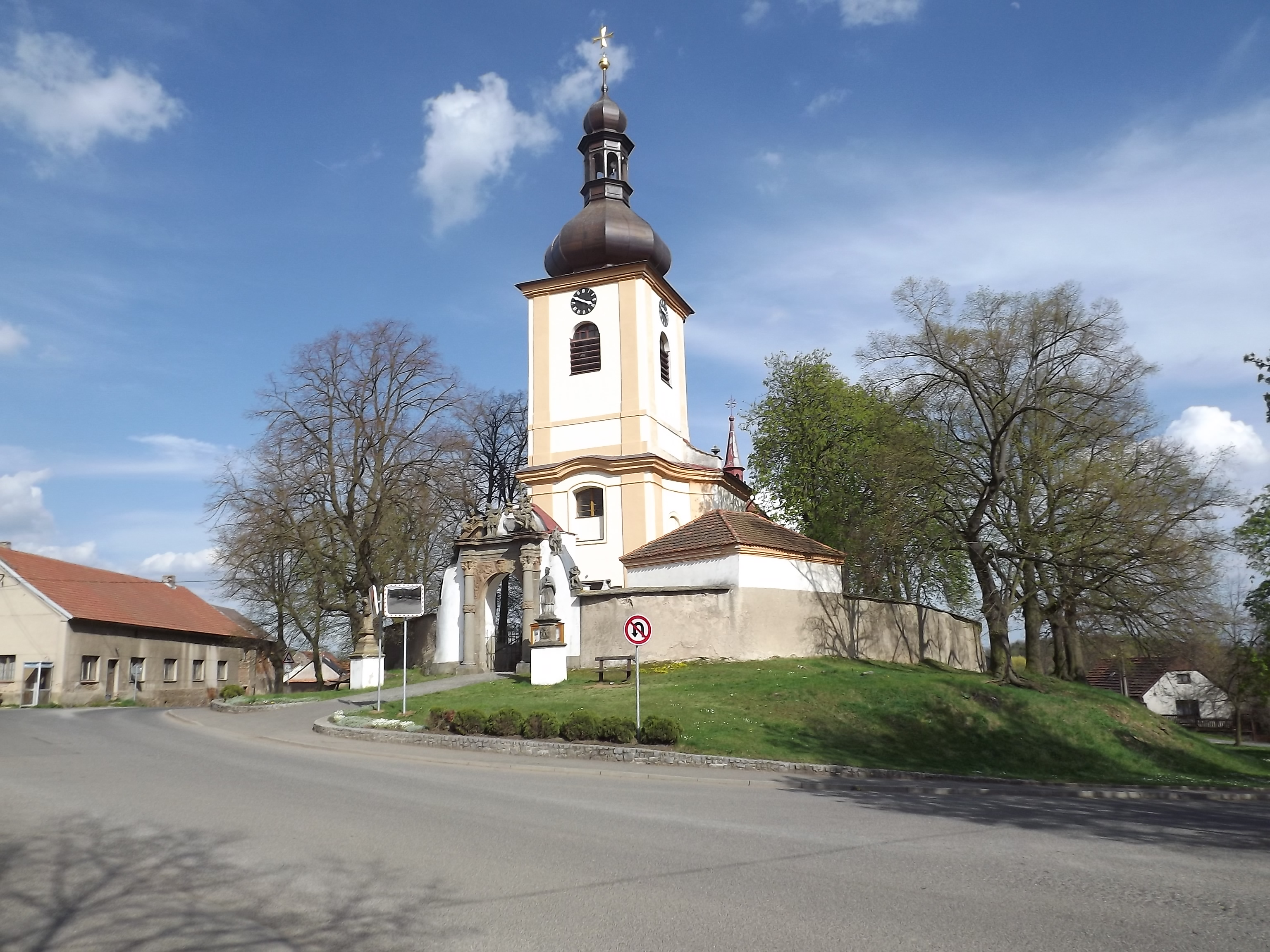
- Church of the Nativity of the Virgin Mary

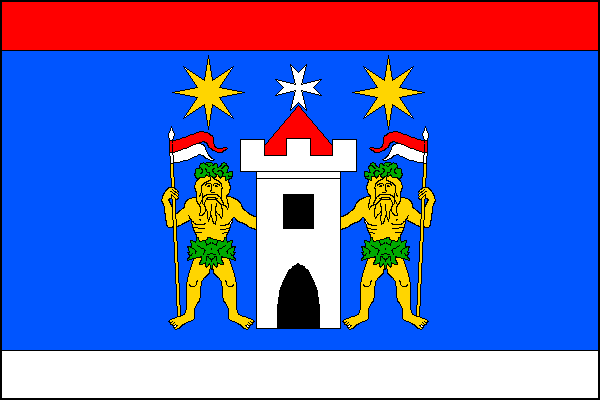
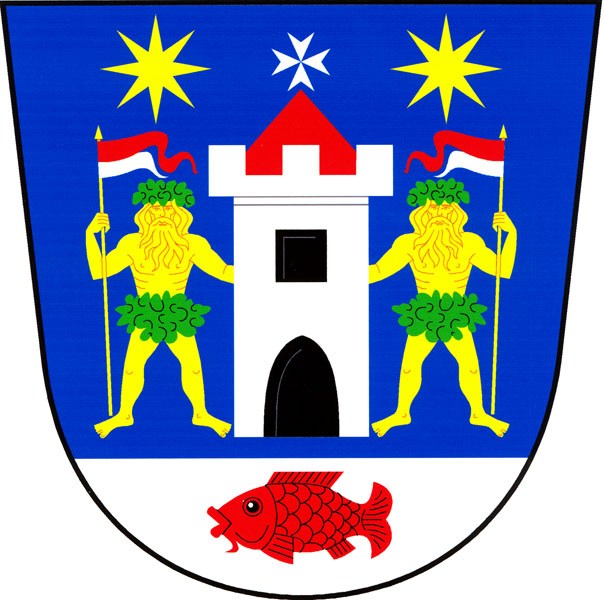
- Flag Coat of arms

- Location in the Czech Republic
- Coordinates: 49°44′44″N 14°3′28″E
- Country: Czech Republic
- Region: Central Bohemian
- District: Příbram
- First mentioned: 1289

Area
  - Total: 14.26 km^{2} (5.51 sq mi)
- Elevation: 472 m (1,549 ft)

Population (2026-01-01)
  - Total: 655
  - Density: 45.9/km^{2} (119/sq mi)
- Time zone: UTC+1 (CET)
  - Summer (DST): UTC+2 (CEST)
- Postal code: 262 25
- Website: www.picin.cz

Pičín is a municipality and village in Příbram District in the Central Bohemian Region of the Czech Republic. It has about 700 inhabitants.

== Etymology ==
The name Pičín was originally spelled Pěčín and Pěčina. It was derived from the old personal Czech name Pieka, which arose from pěkný, i.e. 'nice'.

== Geography ==
Pičín is located about 7 kilometres (4 mi) northeast of Příbram and 39 km (24 mi) southwest of Prague. It lies in the Brdy Highlands. The highest point is the hill Kuchyňka at 636 m (2,087 ft) above sea level, located in the northern tip of the municipal territory. The southern slopes of the hill are protected as the Kuchyňka Nature Reserve. The village is surrounded by several small fishponds.

== History ==
The first written mention of Pičín is from 1289, when the parish church already existed here. A fortress in Pičín was first documented in 1473. The most notable owners of the village were the Bechyně of Lažany family. During their rule, which lasted from 1493 to 1627, they had the fortress rebuilt in the Renaissance style. In 1627, they sold the village to the Dubský family. Jan Ferdinand Dubský founded here a monastery in 1689–1691, but it was abolished in 1786 and later demolished.

== Demographics ==
Historical population

Year	Pop.	±%
1869	680	—
1880	794	+16.8%
1890	662	−16.6%
1900	647	−2.3%
1910	552	−14.7%

Year	Pop.	±%
1921	554	+0.4%
1930	532	−4.0%
1950	439	−17.5%
1961	466	+6.2%
1970	432	−7.3%

Year	Pop.	±%
1980	486	+12.5%
1991	509	+4.7%
2001	527	+3.5%
2011	567	+7.6%
2021	645	+13.8%

Source: Censuses

== Transport ==
There are no railways or major roads passing through the municipality.

== Sights ==
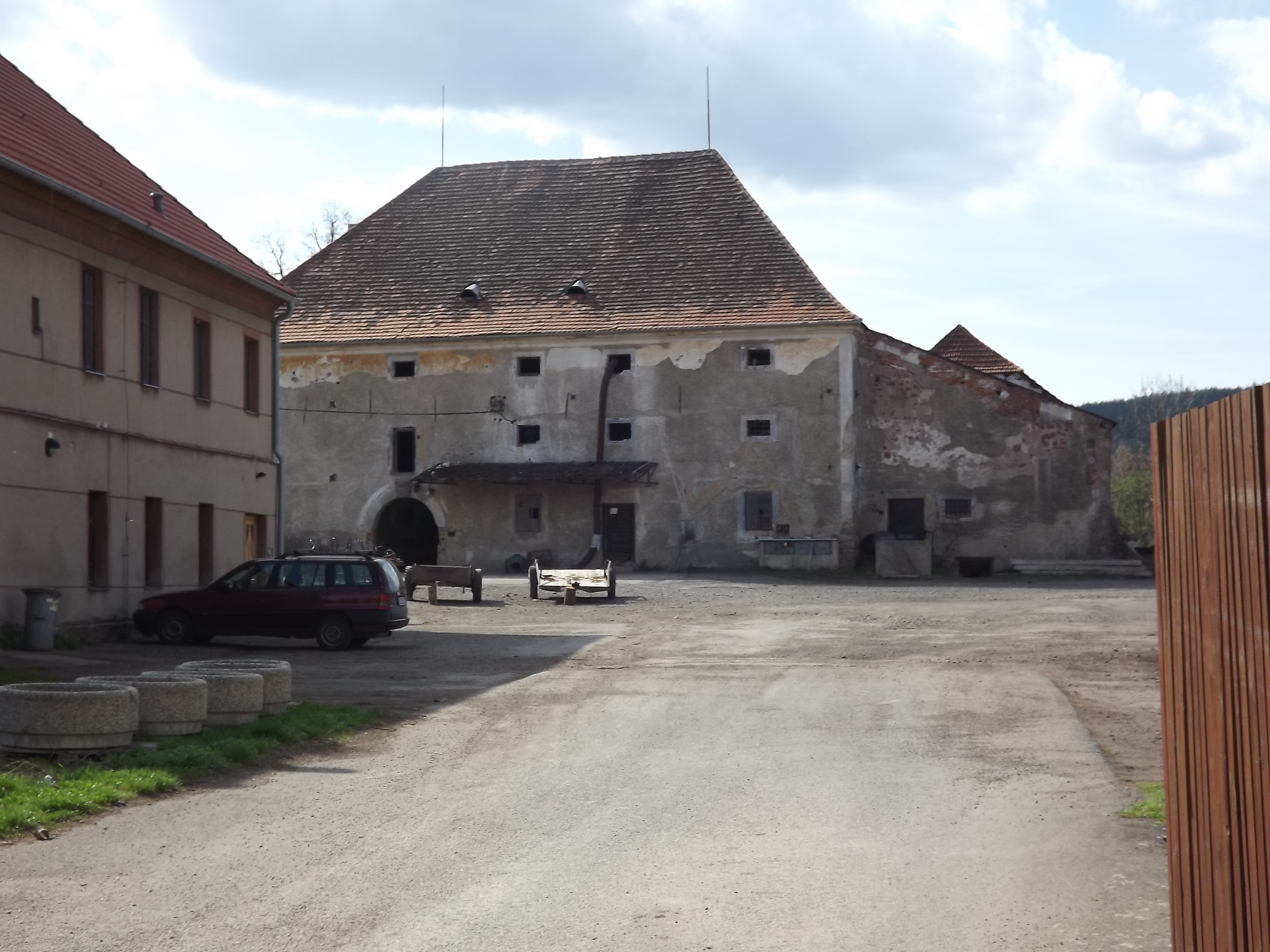
Pičín Fortress

The most important monument is the medieval Pičín Fortress, located above the Příkop pond. It was probably founded in the 13th century. In the 18th century, it lost its function of an aristocratic residence and was converted into a granary. Today it is privately owned.

The Church of the Nativity of the Virgin Mary was built in the early Gothic style in the second half of the 13th century. In the mid-18th century, it was modified in the Baroque style and extended. The church is surrounded by a wall and the gate that belonged to the dissolved monastery dates from 1691. In front of the gate are statues of saints Anthony of Padua and John of Nepomuk.

== Notable people ==
- Kateřina of Komárov (15??–1534), serial killer; lived and murdered here
