= St Vladimir's Church, Moscow =

Church in Basmanny, Russia

Coordinates: 55°45′19″N 37°38′26″E

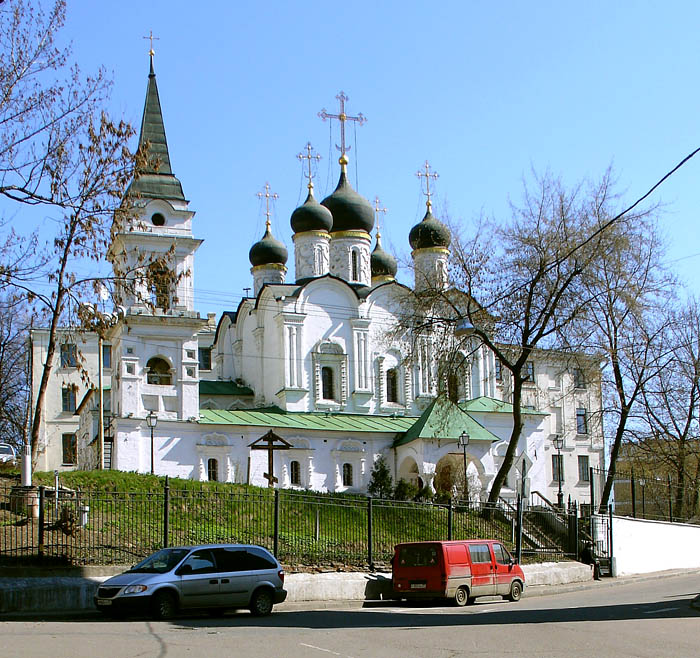
The Prince Vladimir Church in 2007

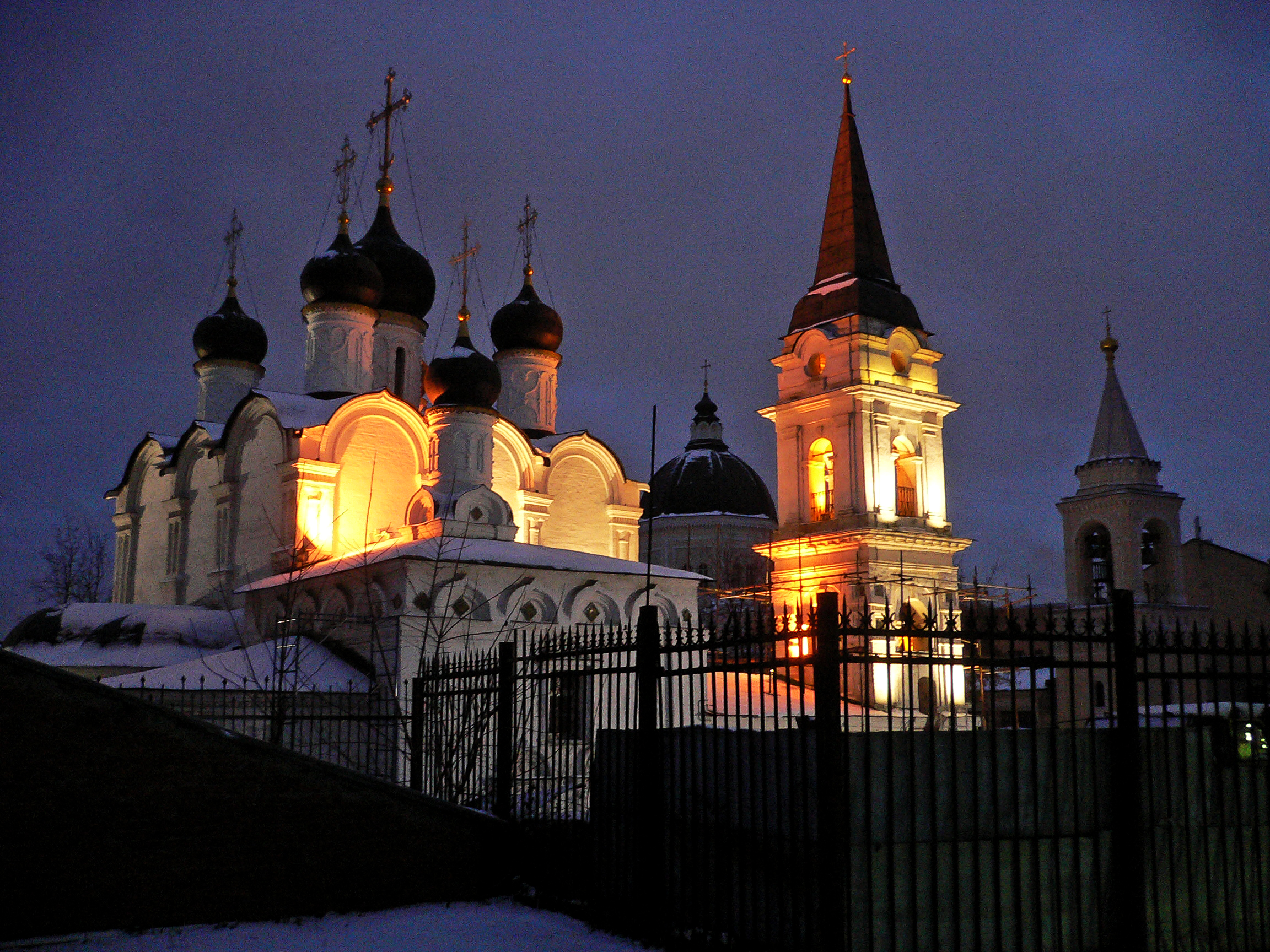
The annex of Sts. Boris and Gleb in the wintry dusk

The Church of St. Vladimir in the Old Gardens (Церковь Святого Владимира в Старых Садах) is a pentacupolar Orthodox church in Basmanny District of Moscow, next to Ivanovsky Convent, close to the confluence of the Yauza and Moskva rivers. It originated in the early 15th century as a palace church of Vasily I and was frequented by royals until the ascension of the Romanov dynasty.

The deliberately archaizing building was erected in the 1660s on the old foundations. The south porch is left over from an earlier church designed by Aloisio the New for Vasily III in 1514. A distinctive belfry was overhauled during Catherine II's reign.

The Soviets closed the church and prepared it for demolition. Its domes were dismantled, and the interior was adapted for storage of books. A 1980 fire destroyed the remaining frescoes. The Russian Orthodox Church obtained the church in 1990 and had it thoroughly repaired and refurnished. Its parish is one of the most prosperous in Moscow.
