= Delphine LaLaurie =

American serial killer (1787–1849)

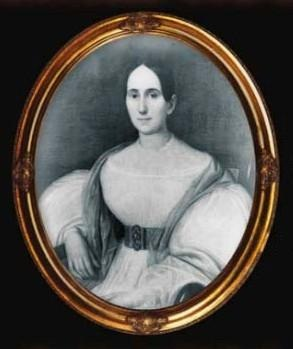
- Born: Marie Delphine Macarty; March 19, 1787; New Orleans, Spanish Louisiana
- Died: December 7, 1849 (aged 62); Paris, France
- Other names: Marie Delphine LaLaurie, Marie Delphine Macarty LaLaurie, Delphine Macarty LaLaurie, Delphine Maccarthy LaLaurie, Madame LaLaurie
- Occupation: Socialite
- Known for: Torturing and killing numerous enslaved people, discovered in 1834
- Spouses: Don Ramón de Lopez y Angulo (m. 1800; died 1804) Jean Blanque (m. 1808; died 1816) Dr. Leonard Louis Nicolas LaLaurie (m. 1825)
- Children: 6

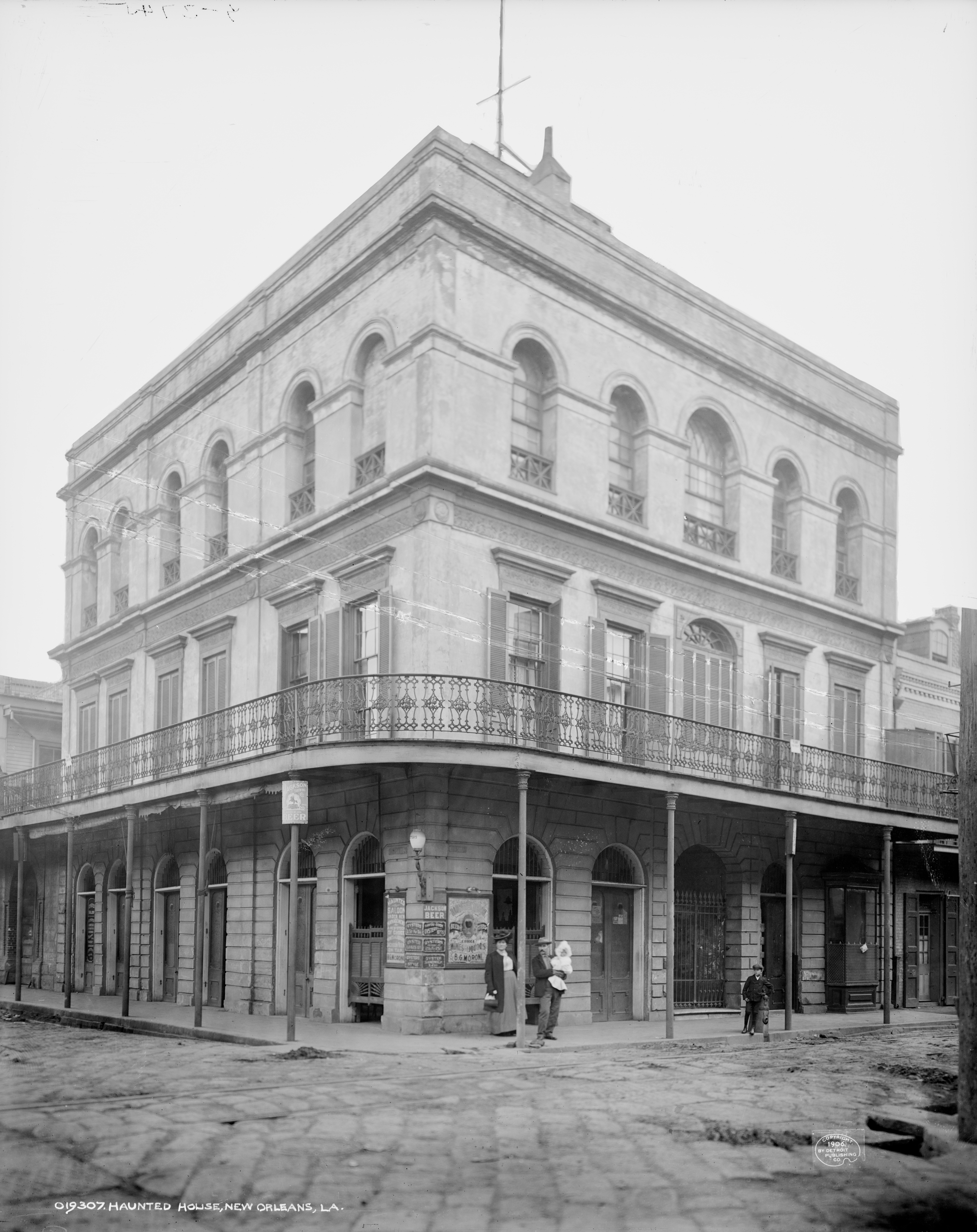
The LaLaurie mansion, from a 1906 postcard

Marie Delphine Macarty or MacCarthy (March 19, 1787 – December 7, 1849), more commonly known as Madame Blanque or, after her third marriage, as Madame LaLaurie, was a New Orleans socialite who tortured and murdered enslaved people in her household.

Born during the Spanish colonial period, LaLaurie married three times in Louisiana and was twice widowed. She maintained her position in New Orleans society until April 10, 1834, when rescuers responded to a fire at her Royal Street mansion. They discovered bound slaves in her attic who showed evidence of cruel, violent abuse over a long period. LaLaurie's house was subsequently sacked by an outraged mob of New Orleans citizens. She escaped to France with her family, and was never brought to justice.

The mansion traditionally held to be LaLaurie's is a landmark in the French Quarter, in part because of its history and for its architectural significance. However, her house was burned by the mob, and the "LaLaurie Mansion" at 1140 Royal Street was in fact rebuilt after her departure from New Orleans.

== Early life and family history ==
Marie Delphine Macarty was born in New Orleans, Spanish Louisiana, on March 19, 1787, as one of five children. Her father was Louis Barthélemy de McCarty (originally Chevalier de MacCarthy), whose father Barthelemy (de) MacCarthy moved the family to New Orleans from Ireland around 1730, during the French colonial period. (The Irish surname MacCarthy was shortened to Macarty or de Macarty.) Her mother was Marie Jeanne L'Érable, also known as "the widow Le Comte", as her marriage to Louis B. Macarty was her second.

Both of Delphine's parents were prominent in the city's European Creole community. Her uncle by marriage, Esteban Rodríguez Miró, was governor of the Spanish American provinces of Louisiana and Florida during 1785–1791, and her cousin, Augustin de Macarty, was mayor of New Orleans from 1815 to 1820.

Delphine was only four years of age when the Haitian Revolution erupted in 1791, something that made slaveholders in the Southern United States and the Caribbean very afraid of resistance and rebellion among slaves; Delphine's uncle had been killed in 1771 by his slaves, and the revolution had inspired the local Mina Conspiracy in 1791, the Pointe Coupée Conspiracy in 1795, and the 1811 German Coast uprising, all of which caused many slaveholders to abuse slaves even more harshly out of fear of insurrection.

== First marriage ==
On June 11, 1800, at age 13, Delphine married Don Ramón de Lopez y Angulo, a Caballero de la Real de Carlos, a high-ranking Spanish royal officer, at the Saint Louis Cathedral in New Orleans. Luisiana, as it was spelled in Spanish, had become a Spanish colony in the 1760s after France was defeated in the Seven Years' War.

In 1804, after the American acquisition of what was then again a French territory, Don Ramón had been appointed to the position of consul general for Spain in the Territory of Orleans and was called to appear at the royal court in Madrid. While en route with Delphine, who was then pregnant, Don Ramón suddenly died in Havana. A few days after his death, Delphine gave birth to their daughter Marie-Borja/Borgia Delphine Lopez y Angulo de la Candelaria, nicknamed "Borquita". The widowed Delphine and her child returned to New Orleans.

== Second marriage ==
In June 1808, aged around 21, Delphine married Jean Blanque, a prominent banker, merchant, lawyer and legislator. At the time of the marriage, Blanque purchased a house at 409 Royal Street for the family, which became known later as the Villa Blanque. Delphine had four children by Blanque, named Marie Louise Pauline, Louise Marie Laure, Marie Louise Jeanne and Jean Pierre Paulin Blanque. The elder Jean Blanque died in 1816.

== Third marriage ==
On June 25, 1825, Delphine married her third husband, physician Leonard Louis Nicolas LaLaurie, who was fifteen years her junior. In 1831, she bought property at 1140 Royal Street, which she managed in her own name with little involvement of her husband. In 1832, she had a two-story mansion built there, complete with attached slave quarters. She lived at the residence with her third husband and two of her daughters, and maintained a central position in New Orleans society.

The marriage soon showed signs of strain, however; on November 16, 1832, Delphine petitioned the First Judicial District Court for a separation from bed and board of her husband, in which Delphine claimed that LaLaurie had "treated her in such a manner as to render their living together unsupportable", claims which her son and two of her daughters by Jean Blanque confirmed. The separation does not seem to have been permanent, as Dr. LaLaurie was present at the Royal Street house April 10, 1834, the day of the fire.

== Torture and murder of slaves and 1834 LaLaurie mansion fire ==
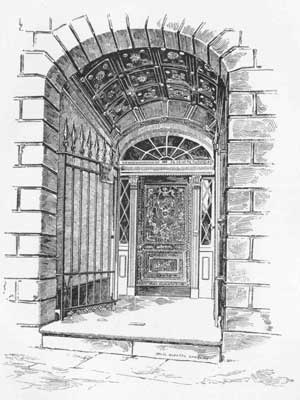
An artist's depiction of the entryway to 1140 Royal Street, c. 1888

Accounts of Delphine's treatment of the people she owned between 1831 and 1834 vary. Harriet Martineau (writing in 1838), recounting tales told to her by New Orleans residents during her 1836 visit, claimed that her slaves were observed to be "singularly haggard and wretched" when compared to other slaves; however, at least in public appearances, LaLaurie was seen to be generally "polite" to black people, and solicitous of the health of her slaves.

Funeral registers between 1830 and 1834 document the deaths of 12 slaves at the Royal Street mansion, although the causes of said deaths are not mentioned. These deaths included a woman named Bonne (c. 1803 – February 7, 1833), a cook and laundress, and her four children, Juliette (c. 1820 – February 21, 1833, died age 13), Florence (c. 1821 – February 16, 1831, d. age 10), Jules (c. 1827 – May 29, 1833, d. age 6) and the youngest, Leontine (c. 1829 – August 26, 1831, d. age 2), respectively. Bonne had previously been owned by a refugee from Saint Domingue, and was described during her sale as "a chronic runaway"; with an influx of white and free Saint Dominguen refugees of color and their slaves, the fear of the enslaved from Saint Domingue still lingered in Louisiana.

Court records of the time show that LaLaurie freed two slaves (Jean Louis in 1819 and Devince in 1832). Martineau wrote that public rumors about her mistreatment of slaves at the Royal Street residence were sufficiently widespread that a local lawyer was dispatched to the property to remind LaLaurie of the laws for the upkeep of slaves. During this visit, the lawyer found no evidence to suggest wrongdoing or mistreatment of slaves by LaLaurie.

Martineau also recounted other tales of LaLaurie's cruelty that were whispered amongst New Orleans' residents around 1836, saying that (subsequent to the visit of the lawyer) one of LaLaurie's neighbors saw an eight-year-old enslaved girl fall to her death from the roof of the mansion while trying to avoid punishment from a whip-wielding LaLaurie. The girl's body was subsequently buried on the mansion grounds. Jeanne DeLavigne, in her 1945 account, gave the child's age as 12 years old and named her as Lia (or Leah). Later writers elaborated on the case, saying that Lia had been brushing Delphine's hair when she hit a snag, angering LaLaurie to the point that she grabbed a whip and started chasing her.

According to Martineau, this incident led to an investigation of the LaLauries, in which they were found guilty of illegal cruelty and forced to forfeit nine slaves of the household. These nine slaves were bought back by the LaLauries through an intermediary relative, and thus returned to the mansion. Similarly, Martineau recounted stories that LaLaurie kept her cook starved and chained to the kitchen stove, beating her daughters when they attempted to feed themselves or others.

On April 10, 1834, a fire broke out in the Royal Street mansion, beginning in the kitchen. When police and fire marshals reached the residence, they found a 70-year-old cook chained to the stove by her ankle. The cook later said that she had set the fire as a suicide attempt because she feared being punished, stating that slaves taken to the uppermost room "never came back".

As reported in the New Orleans Bee of April 11, 1834, bystanders responding to the fire attempted to enter the slave quarters to ensure that everyone had been evacuated. Upon being refused the keys by the LaLauries, the bystanders broke down the doors to the quarters and found "seven people, more or less horribly mutilated ... suspended by the neck, with their limbs apparently stretched and torn from one extremity to the other", who claimed to have been imprisoned there for some months.

One of those who entered the premises was Judge Jean François Canonge, who subsequently deposed to having found in the LaLaurie mansion (among others) a "negress ... wearing an iron collar" and "an old negro woman who had received a very deep wound on her head [who was] too weak to be able to walk". Canonge said that, when he questioned LaLaurie's husband about the slaves, he was told in an insolent manner that "some people had better stay at home rather than come to others' houses to dictate laws and meddle with other people's business". A version of this story, circulating in 1836 and recounted by Martineau, added that the slaves were emaciated, showed signs of being flayed with a whip, were bound in restrictive postures, and wore spiked iron collars which kept their heads in static positions.

When the discovery of the abused slaves became widely known, a mob of local citizens attacked the Royal Street mansion and "demolished and destroyed everything upon which they could lay their hands". A sheriff and his officers were called to disperse the crowd, but, by the time the mob left, the property had sustained major damage, with "scarcely any thing [remaining] but the walls." Marie's slaves were taken to a local jail, where they were available for public viewing. The Bee reported that, by April 12, up to 4,000 people had attended to view the slaves "to convince themselves of their sufferings".

The Pittsfield Sun, citing the New Orleans Advertiser and writing several weeks after the evacuation of LaLaurie's quarters of her victims, claimed that two of the enslaved people found in the mansion had died following their rescue. It added, "We understand ... that in digging the yard, bodies have been disinterred, and the condemned well [in the grounds of the mansion] having been uncovered, others, particularly that of a child, were found." These claims were repeated by Martineau in her 1838 book Retrospect of Western Travel, where she placed the number of unearthed bodies at two, including the aforementioned child, Lia.

== Escape from punishment and migration to France ==
LaLaurie's life after the 1834 fire is not well documented. Martineau wrote in 1838 that she fled New Orleans during the mob violence that followed the fire, taking a coach to the waterfront and traveling, by schooner, to Mobile, Alabama, and then to Paris. By the time Martineau personally visited the Royal Street mansion in 1836, it was still unoccupied and badly damaged, with "gaping windows and empty walls".

== Later life and death ==
Copper plate found in Saint Louis Cemetery #1, which claims that LaLaurie died in Paris in 1842

While Delphine was living in exile in Paris with her mother and two sisters, Pauline and Laure, her son Paulin Blanque wrote on August 15, 1842, to his brother-in-law, Auguste DeLassus, stating that Delphine was serious about returning to New Orleans and had thought about doing so for a long time. He wrote in the same letter that he believed that his mother never had any idea about the reason for her departure from the city. Despite Delphine's "bad mood" and her determination to return, the disapproval of her children and other relatives had apparently been enough for her to cancel her plan.

The circumstances of LaLaurie's death are also unclear. In 1888, George Washington Cable recounted a popular but unsubstantiated story that LaLaurie had died in France in a boar-hunting accident. In the late 1930s, Eugene Backes, who served as sexton to St. Louis Cemetery #1 until 1924, discovered an old, cracked copper plate in Alley 4 of the cemetery. The inscription on the plate read, "Madame Lalaurie, née Marie Delphine Maccarthy, décédée à Paris, le 7 Décembre, 1842, à l'âge de 6–." The English translation of the inscription reads: "Madame Lalaurie, born Marie Delphine Mccarthy, died in Paris, December 7, 1842, at the age of 6–." According to the French archives of Paris, however, LaLaurie died on December 7, 1849, and not 1842, at the age of 62.

== LaLaurie mansion ==
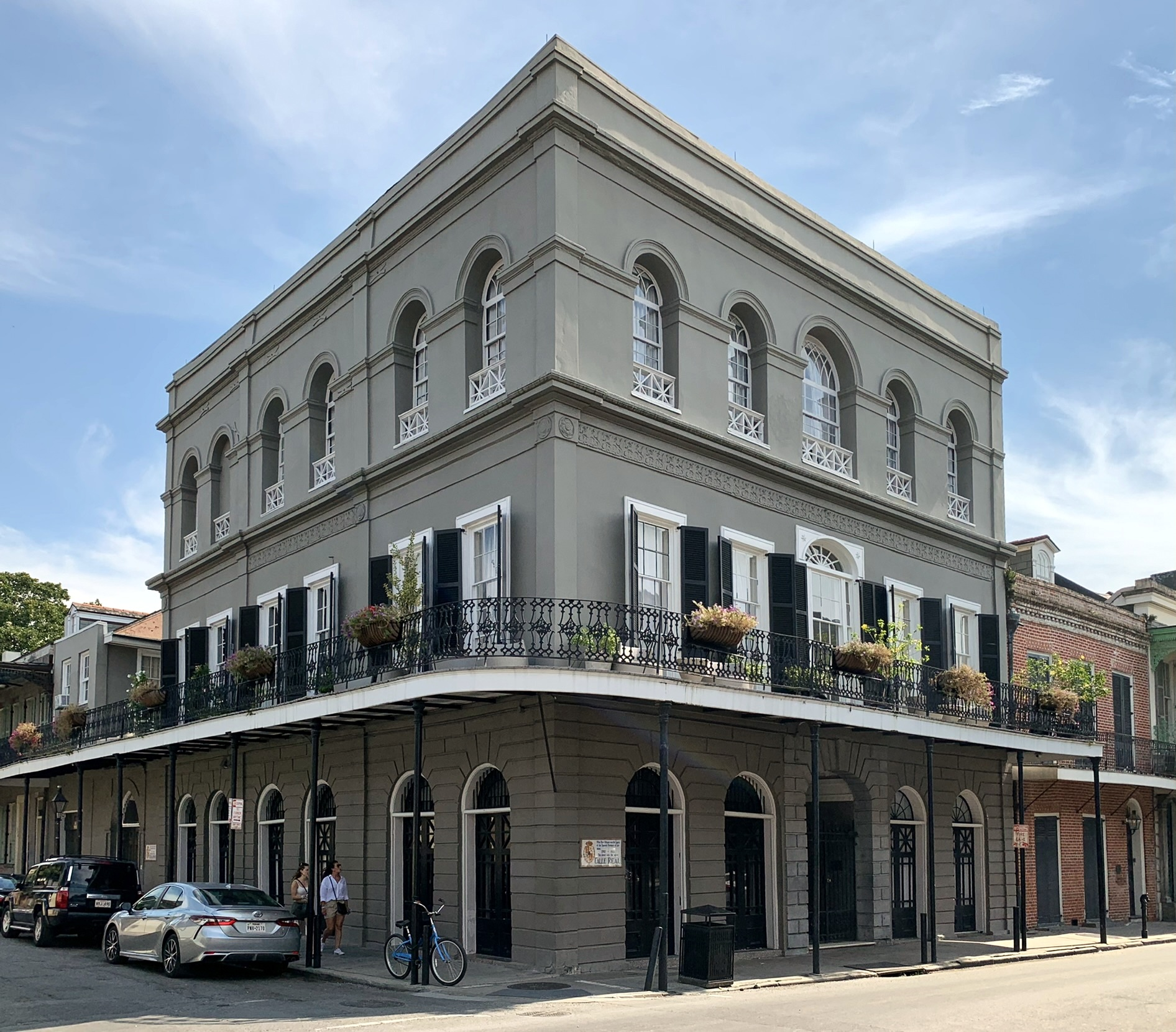
The former LaLaurie house at 1140 Royal Street, photographed September 2022

The original Royal Street mansion occupied by LaLaurie did not survive. The mansion, located on the corner of Governor Nicholls Street (formerly known as Hospital Street), commonly referred to as the LaLaurie or Haunted House, is not the same building inhabited by LaLaurie. When she acquired the property in 1831 from Edmond Soniat du Fossat, a house was already under construction and finished for LaLaurie. This house was burned by the mob in 1834 and remained in a ruined state for at least another four years. It was then rebuilt by Pierre Trastour after 1838 and assumed the appearance that it has today. Over the following decades, it was used as a public high school, a conservatory of music, an apartment building, a refuge for young delinquents, a bar, a furniture store and a luxury apartment building.

The dwelling had a third floor and rear building added later in the 19th century, and the rear building on Governor Nicholls Street, which had only one floor until a second one was added in the 20th century, was remodeled in the 1970s when the second-floor interior of the building was done over by Koch and Wilson, architects. At three stories high, it was described in 1928 as "the highest building for squares around", with the result that "from the cupola on the roof one may look out over the Vieux Carré and see the Mississippi in its crescent before Jackson Square".

The entrance to the building bears iron grillwork, and the door is carved with an image of "Phoebus in his chariot, and with wreaths of flowers and depicting garlands in bas-relief". Inside, the vestibule is floored in black and white marble, and a curved mahogany-railed staircase runs the full three stories of the building. The second floor holds three large drawing rooms connected by ornamented sliding doors, whose walls are decorated with plaster rosettes, carved woodwork, black marble mantle pieces and fluted pilasters.

In April 2007, actor Nicolas Cage bought the house for a sum of $3.45 million. The mortgage documents were arranged in such a way that Cage's name did not appear on them. On November 13, 2009, the property, then valued at $3.5 million, was listed for auction as a result of foreclosure and purchased by Regions Financial Corporation for $2.3 million. The property last changed hands in 2010 when it was purchased by current owner Michael Whalen for $2.1 million (~$3.02 million in 2025).

== LaLaurie in folklore ==
Folk histories of LaLaurie's abuse and the murder of her slaves circulated in Louisiana during the 19th century, and were reprinted in collections of stories by Henry Castellanos and George Washington Cable. Cable's account (not to be confused with his unrelated 1881 novel Madame Delphine) was based on contemporary reports in newspapers such as the Bee and the Advertiser, and upon Martineau's 1838 account, Retrospect of Western Travel. He added some of his own synthesis, dialogue, and speculation.

After 1945, accounts of the abused slaves became more explicit. Jeanne deLavigne, writing in Ghost Stories of Old New Orleans (1946), alleged that LaLaurie had a "sadistic appetite [that] seemed never appeased until she had inflicted on one or more of her black servitors some hideous form of torture" and claimed that those who responded to the 1834 fire had found "male slaves, stark naked, chained to the wall, their eyes gouged out, their fingernails pulled off by the roots; others had their joints skinned and festering, great holes in their buttocks where the flesh had been sliced away, their ears hanging by shreds, their lips sewn together ... Intestines were pulled out and knotted around naked waists. There were holes in skulls, where a rough stick had been inserted to stir the brains." DeLavigne did not cite any sources for these claims, and they were not supported by the primary sources.

The story was further embellished in Journey Into Darkness: Ghosts and Vampires of New Orleans (1998) by Kalila Katherina Smith, the operator of a New Orleans ghost tour business. Smith's book added several more explicit details to the discoveries allegedly made by rescuers during the 1834 fire, including a "victim [who] obviously had her arms amputated and her skin peeled off in a circular pattern, making her look like a human caterpillar," and another who had had her limbs broken and reset "at odd angles so she resembled a human crab". Many of the new details in Smith's book were unsourced, while others were not supported by the sources given.

Today, modern re-tellings of the LaLaurie legend often use DeLavigne and Smith's versions of the tale as the basis for claims of explicit tortures, and number the slaves who died under LaLaurie's care at as many as 100.

== In popular culture ==
In her 1999 novel Fever Season, mystery writer Barbara Hambly incorporated the events of the 1834 fire and discovery of the brutal treatment of the slaves into her narrative.

The 2000 horror film The St. Francisville Experiment is loosely based on the story of Delphine LaLaurie.

Kathy Bates portrayed a heavily fictionalized version of the character in the third season of the anthology television series American Horror Story to widespread critical acclaim and earned a Primetime Emmy Award for Outstanding Supporting Actress in a Limited or Anthology Series or Movie for her performance. In the series, some of her actions are conflated with those of Elizabeth Bathory such as when she applies blood to her skin to appear younger.

In the 2015–2017 serialized science fiction novel Unsong by writer Scott Alexander, LaLaurie is mentioned as being in the nicest part of hell, reserved for the worst sinners, along with Hitler and Beria.

== See also ==
- Augustin de Macarty, Mayor of New Orleans, cousin of Delphine
- John Crenshaw, 19th century Illinois human trafficker
- History of slavery in Louisiana
- List of serial killers in the United States

=== Similar cases ===
- Elizabeth Báthory (16th century Hungary)
- Elizabeth Branch (17th century England)
- Elizabeth Brownrigg (18th century England)
- La Quintrala (colonial Chile)
- Darya Nikolayevna Saltykova (18th century Russia)
- Mariam Soulakiotis (20th century Greece)
