= Darya Nikolayevna Saltykova =

Russian noblewoman and serial killer (1730–1801)

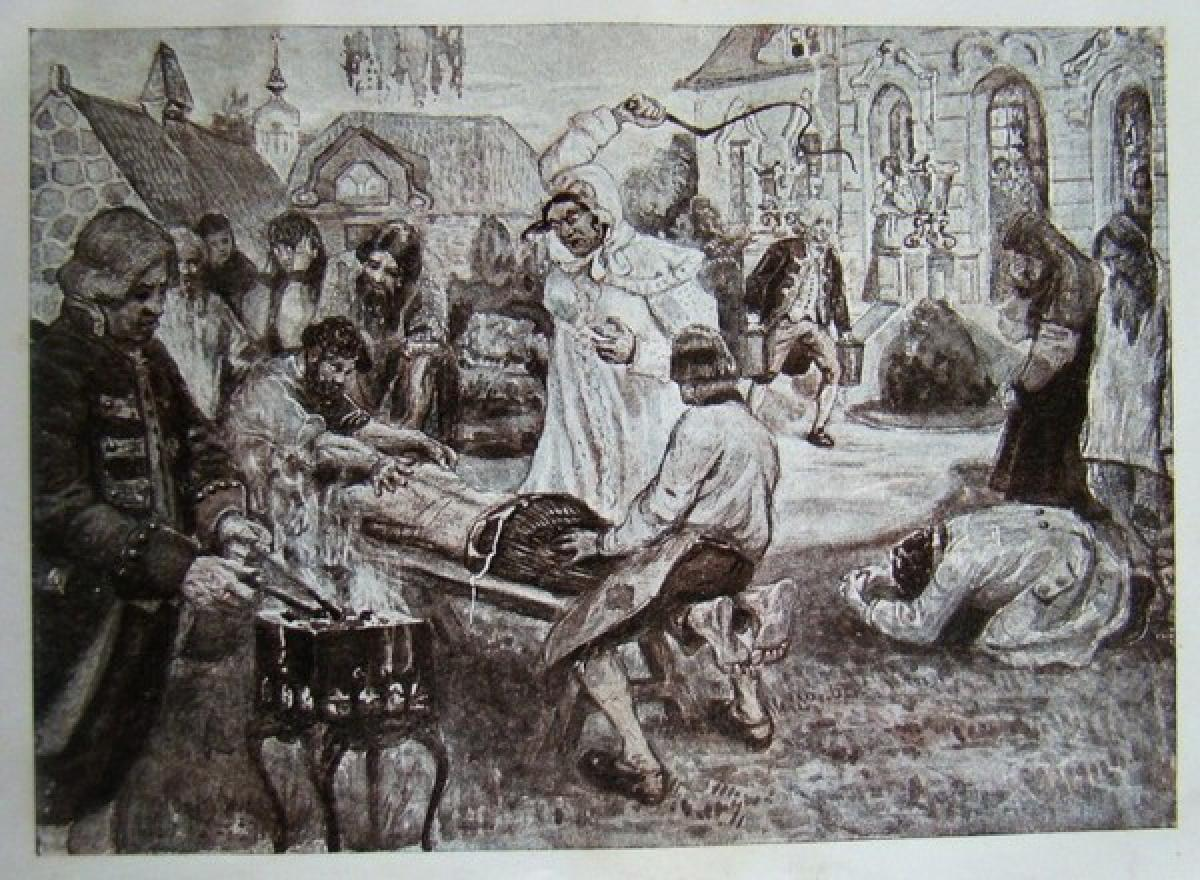
- Darya Nikolayevna Saltykova punishing one of her serfs
- Born: Darya Nikolayevna Ivanova; 11 March 1730; Russian Empire
- Died: 9 December 1801 (aged 71); Ivanovsky Convent, Moscow, Moscow Governorate, Russian Empire
- Other name: Saltychikha
- Convictions: Murder (38 counts); Torture
- Penalty: Life imprisonment

Details
- Victims: 38–138
- Span of crimes: 1756–1762
- Country: Russia
- Date apprehended: 1762

Darya Nikolayevna Saltykova (Russian: Да́рья Никола́евна Салтыко́ва; née Ivanova, Ива́нова; 11 March 1730 – 9 December 1801), commonly known as Saltychikha (Russian: Салтычи́ха, IPA: [səltɨˈt͡ɕixə]), was a Russian noblewoman from the Saltykov family, sadist, and serial killer from Moscow. She became notorious for torturing and killing many of her serfs, mostly women. Saltykova has been compared by many to the Hungarian "Blood Countess," Elizabeth Báthory (1560–1614), who allegedly committed similar crimes in her home, Čachtice Castle, against servant girls and local serfs, although historians debate the accuracy of these charges.

== Early life ==
Darya Ivanova was born into a rich and ancient Russian noble family, as one of five daughters of Nikolai Avtonomovich Ivanov and his wife, Anna Ivanovna Davydova. Her sisters were: Feodora Nikolayevna Zhukova (b. 1715), Marfa Nikolayevna Izmailova (b. 1738), Agrafiona Nikolayevna Tyutcheva and Tatiana Nikolayevna Muravyova.

Darya Ivanova married the nobleman Gleb Alexeyevich Saltykov, uncle of Nikolai Saltykov, a member of the powerful Saltykov family. She had two sons: Theodore (1750–1801) and Nicholas (1751–1775). Darya Saltykova was widowed in 1755, at the age of 25. With her husband's death, she inherited a substantial estate, where she lived with her two young sons and a great number of serfs.

== Sadist and serial killer ==
Many early complaints to authorities about the deaths at the Saltykova estate were ignored or resulted in punishment for complaining. Saltykova was well connected with those in power at the Russian royal court and with the Russian nobility. Eventually, relatives of the victims were able to bring a petition before Empress Catherine II. Catherine decided to try Saltykova publicly, in order to further her "lawfulness" initiative. Saltykova was arrested in 1762.

Saltykova was held until 1768 while the authorities conducted a painstaking investigation. Catherine's Collegium of Justice questioned many witnesses and examined the records of the Saltykov estate. The investigating official counted as many as 138 suspicious deaths, of which the vast majority were attributed to Saltykova.

Saltykova was found guilty of having killed 38 serfs by beating and torturing them to death, but Empress Catherine was unsure how to punish her. Capital punishment had been abolished in Russia in 1754, and the new Empress needed the support of the nobility. Several of Saltykova's accomplices were also found guilty and were sentenced to public flogging followed by hard labour terms.

== Imprisonment and death ==
In 1768, Saltykova was chained on a public platform in Moscow for one hour, with a sign around her neck with the text: "This woman has tortured and murdered". Many people came to look at her while she was being scornfully ridiculed. Afterwards, Saltykova was sent for life imprisonment in the cellar of the Ivanovsky Convent in Moscow. Saltykova died on 9 December 1801, and was buried next to her relatives in the Donskoy Monastery necropolis.

== Legacy ==
Saltykova's reputation and deeds have always been a prominent part of Russian history. In 2022, a sixteen-episode series entitled The Bloody Duchess inspired by her life aired on Amazon Prime Video. The series is also available on Apple TV+.

== See also ==
- Elizabeth Báthory
- Elizabeth Branch
- Elizabeth Brownrigg
- Delphine LaLaurie
- Catalina de los Ríos y Lisperguer
- List of Russian serial killers
