= Komárov (Beroun District) =

- Market town
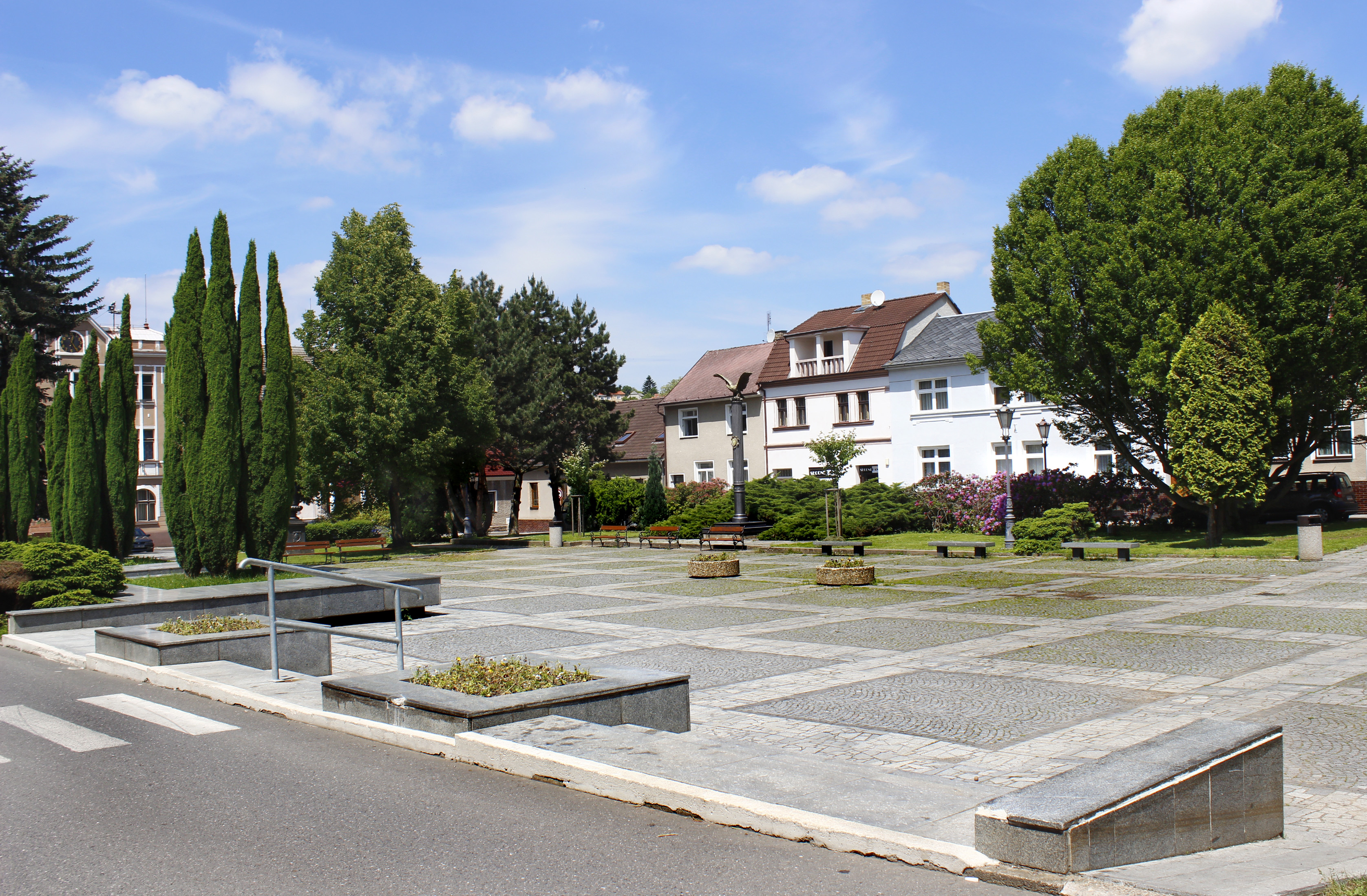
- Míru Square

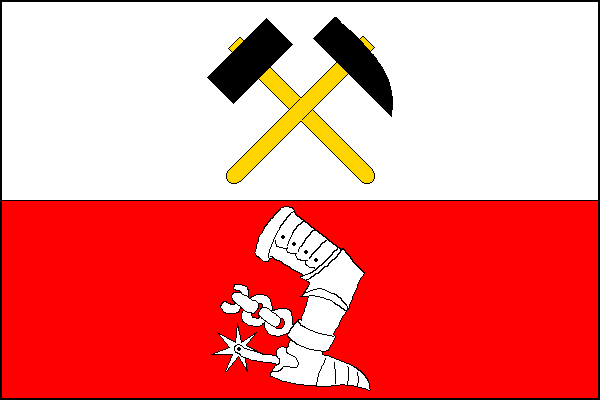
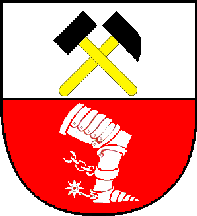
- Flag Coat of arms

- Location in the Czech Republic
- Coordinates: 49°48′24″N 13°51′23″E
- Country: Czech Republic
- Region: Central Bohemian
- District: Beroun
- First mentioned: 1263

Area
  - Total: 6.16 km^{2} (2.38 sq mi)
- Elevation: 398 m (1,306 ft)

Population (2026-01-01)
  - Total: 2,439
  - Density: 396/km^{2} (1,030/sq mi)
- Time zone: UTC+1 (CET)
  - Summer (DST): UTC+2 (CEST)
- Postal code: 267 62
- Website: www.ikomarov.cz

Komárov (Czech pronunciation: [ˈkomaːrof]) is a market town in Beroun District in the Central Bohemian Region of the Czech Republic. It has about 2,400 inhabitants.

== Administrative division ==
Komárov consists of two municipal parts (in brackets population according to the 2021 census):

- Komárov (2,323)
- Kleštěnice (23)

== Etymology ==
The name Komárov was derived either from the personal name Komár, meaning "Komár's (court)", or from the Czech word komár, ('mosquito'), referring to a swampy place with an abundance of mosquitoes.

== Geography ==
Komárov is located about 22 kilometres (14 mi) southwest of Beroun and 45 km (28 mi) southwest of Prague. It lies on the border between the Brdy Highlands and Hořovice Uplands. The highest point is the hill Hlava at 552 m (1,811 ft) above sea level.

== History ==
The first written mention of Komárov is from 1263, in a deed of the Ostrov Monastery in Davle. Until 1602, it was owned by the Pešík family. The Pešík family developed the processing of iron ore mined in the area. In 1602, Komárov was bought by Jindřich Otta of Los. After his execution in 1621, Komárov was merged with the Hořovice estate and shared its owners, which lasted until 1902.

In 1917, it became a market town. In 1962, the municipality of Kleštěnice was merged with Komárov.

== Demographics ==
Historical population

Year	Pop.	±%
1869	1,262	—
1880	1,059	−16.1%
1890	1,103	+4.2%
1900	1,228	+11.3%
1910	1,353	+10.2%

Year	Pop.	±%
1921	1,542	+14.0%
1930	1,595	+3.4%
1950	1,575	−1.3%
1961	1,873	+18.9%
1970	1,915	+2.2%

Year	Pop.	±%
1980	2,271	+18.6%
1991	2,477	+9.1%
2001	2,466	−0.4%
2011	2,414	−2.1%
2021	2,346	−2.8%

Source: Censuses

== Transport ==
There are no railways or major roads passing through the municipality.

== Sights ==
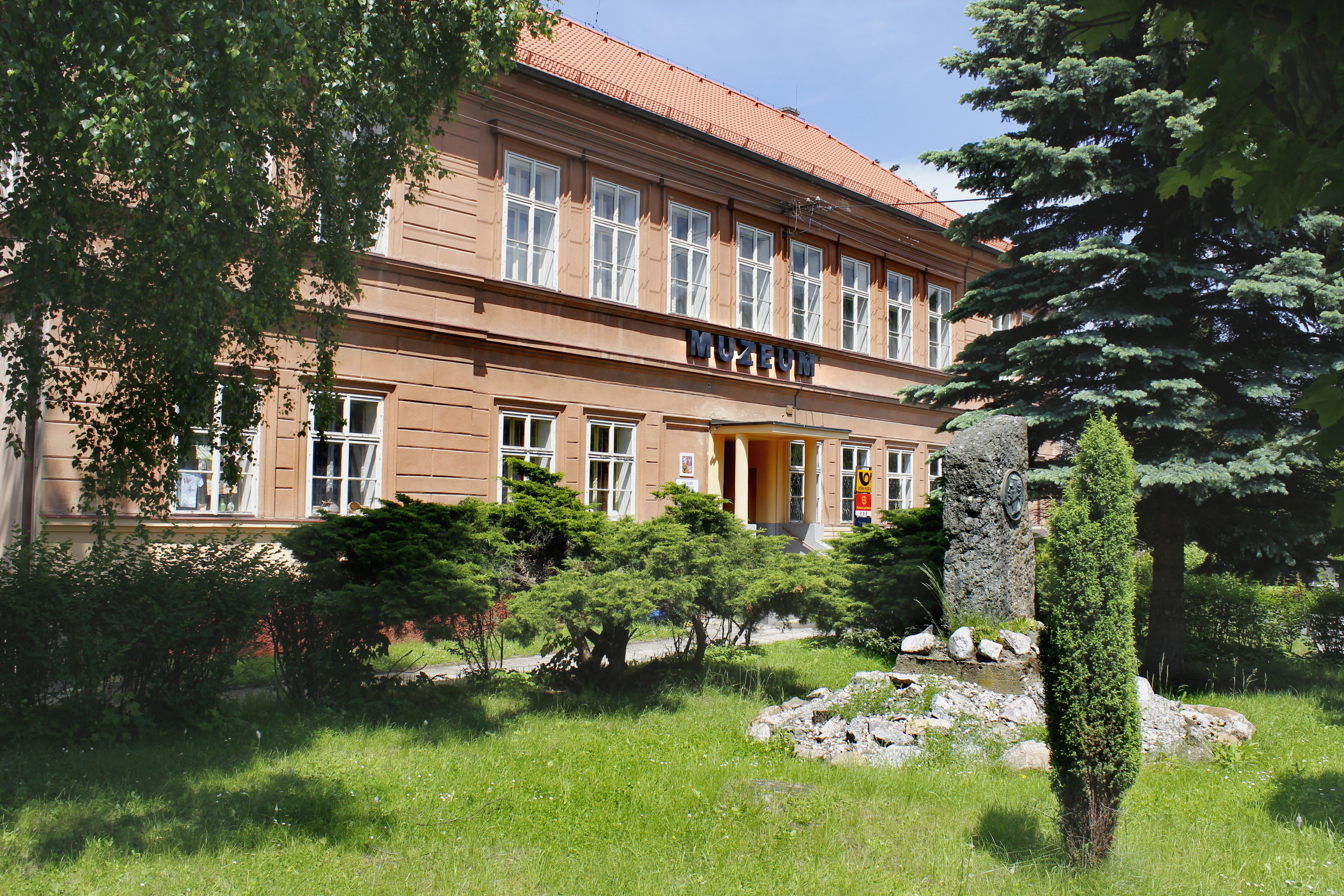
Komárov Castle, today a museum

The main landmark of Komárov is the Komárov Castle. It was built on the site of an old Gothic fortress, from which the cellars and the Gothic portal have been preserved. Today the castle houses the Ironworks and Foundry Museum.

The folk architecture in the historic centre of Kleštěnice is well preserved and is protected as a village monument zone.

== Notable people ==
- Kateřina of Komárov (?–1534), serial killer
