= Mariam Soulakiotis =

Greek Orthodox abbess and convicted serial killer (1883–1954)

- Μαριάμ Σουλακιώτη (Note: Greek: Μαριάμ Σουλακιώτη) or Σουλακιώτου (Note: Greek: Μαριάμ Σουλακιώτου)
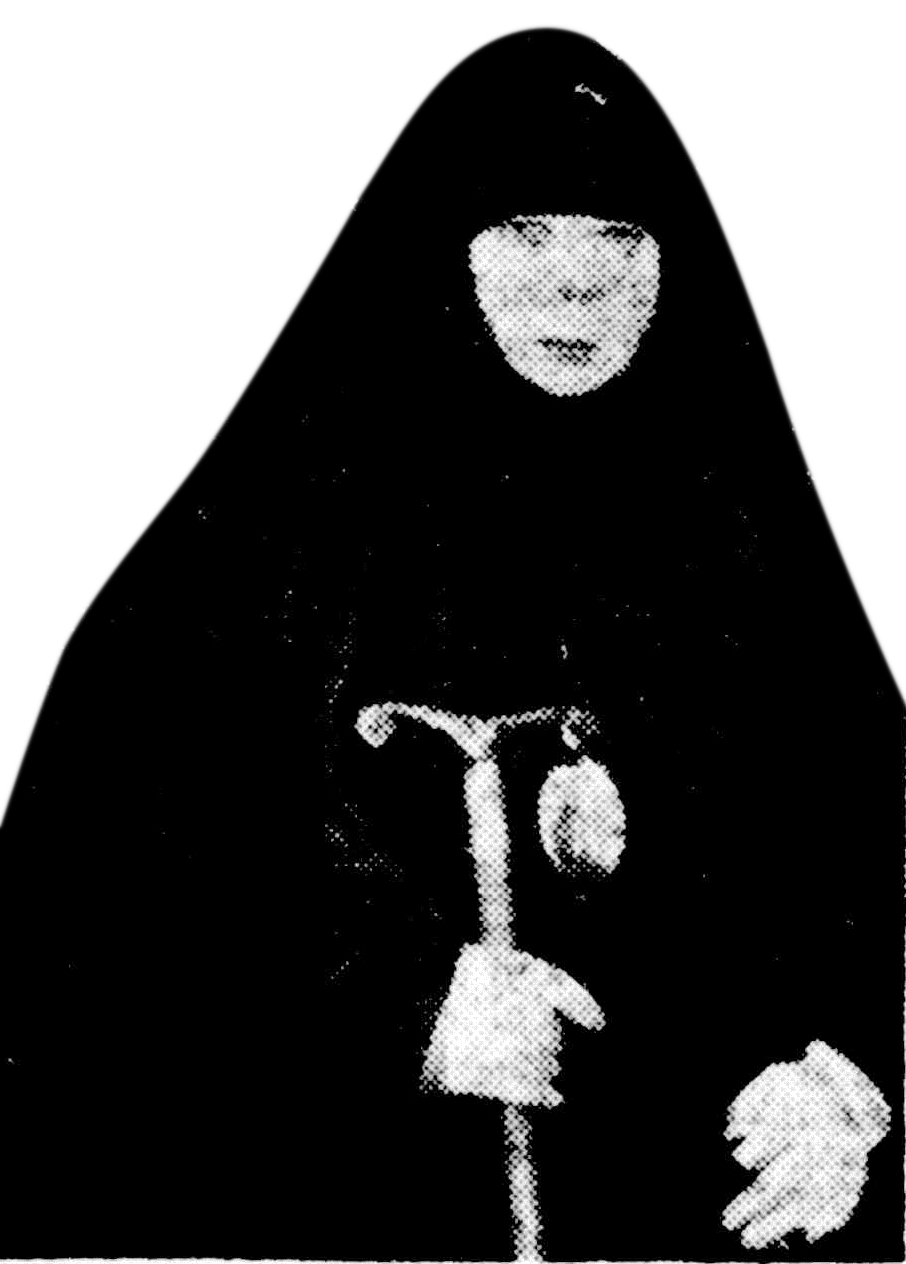
- Soulakiotis in 1951
- Born: Marina Soulakiotou (Note: Greek: Μαρίνα Σουλακιώτου) c. 1883 (Note: Press reports state she died in 1954 at the age of 71.); No. 71 Megalou Alexandrou, (Note: Greek: Μεγάλου Αλεξάνδρου 71) Keratea, Greece
- Died: 23 November 1954 (aged 71) (Note: For example, Reuters listed her age as 65 in 1953 but as 71 in her 1954 obituary.); Averoff Prison
- Resting place: Panagia Pefkovounogiatrissa Monastery [wd] (Note: Greek: Μονή Παναγίας Πευκοβουνογιάτρισσας)
- Occupations: Nun, abbess, convicted criminal
- Organization: Greek Old Calendarists (Matthewite)
- Predecessor: Bishop Matthew Karpathakis of Vresthena (†1950) (Note: Greek: Επίσκοπος Βρεσθένης Ματθαίος Καρπαθάκης; Epískopos Vresthénīs Matthaíos Karpathákīs)
- Penalty: 14 years in prison (died with pending criminal cases)

Details
- Victims: 177+
- Date apprehended: 5 December 1950
- Imprisoned at: Averoff Prison

Abbess Mariam Soulakiotis (Note: Her title was occasionally given (incorrectly) as Mother Superior in English-language works contemporary to her trials.) (c. 1883 – 23 November 1954), née Marina Soulakiotou, also known either to her followers as Mariam of Keratea, (Note: Greek: Ηγουμένη (Μητέρα) Μαριάμ Κερατέας) or in contemporary media pejoratively as "Mother Rasputin", (Note: Greek: Η γυναίκα Ρασπούτιν, lit. 'the woman Rasputin') was a Greek Old Calendarist Orthodox abbess and serial killer who was found guilty of numerous counts of murder, fraud and other crimes, which public prosecutors of the Kingdom of Greece alleged she committed against both laypeople and other nuns in her abbey between 1939 and her arrest in December 1950.

During the time period of the crimes she was convicted of, Soulakiotis was neither a member of the mainstream Greek Orthodox Church nor in communion with the other, larger Old Calendarist group (the "Florinites")—she was a devoted follower of Archbishop Matthew Karpathakis of Vresthena, whom both groups consider a schismatic.

Greek civil authorities first arrested Soulakiotis on two charges unrelated to serial murder: export of olive oil to Cyprus and import of tires after a large raid on her abbey which took place on 4 December 1950. Receiving multiple sentences over her three trials totalling fourteen years, (Note: Due to her old age upon sentencing, her sentence is sometimes described as life in prison despite not legally having been such.) Soulakiotis died in Averoff Prison on 23 November 1954. As she died before all of her criminal trials were done, she was only technically found guilty of seven premeditated murders—as well as more than one hundred negligent homicides due to offering 'free' tuberculosis treatment that only consisted of staying at her monastery's high altitude locale, not medical therapy. Excluding these negligent homicides, the typically agreed upon total of her victims is 27; including them, 177.

Soulakiotis' convent was the Panagia Pefkovounogiatrissa Monastery ("The Convent of the Virgin in the Pines") near Keratea, Greece. As of 2022, the Old Calendarist abbey Soulakiotis once managed remains open and still has nuns who believe she was innocent and who venerate her as a saint. Some modern Greek Old Calendarists on Matthew's side of the schism (but outside the convent) concur.

Modern secular historians, however, reject the possibility of her innocence, based on the overwhelming number of witness statements and amount of evidence, although disagreement exists as to the true number of her victims.

== Early life (c. 1883 – c. 1900) ==
Little is known of Soulakiotis' life before she became an Orthodox nun, except that she was a factory worker, and that she was born with the given name Marina c. 1883 in Keratea, Greece, which is around 50 kilometers (31 mi) from Athens. Her childhood home, later converted into one of the monastery's buildings, was at No. 71 Megalou Alexandrou St.

== Religious life ==
=== As Greek Orthodox nun (c. 1900–1923) ===
Soulakiotis started as a nun in the mainstream Greek Orthodox Church (GOC), but soon became a close confidante of her religious superior, the Bishop Matthew Karpathakis of Vresthena. After the adoption of the New Calendar by the GOC at the pan-orthodox Council of Constantinople in May 1923, Soulakiotis became an avid Old Calendarist and a follower of Bishop Matthew, now self-styled Archbishop Matthew of Vresthena, whom both the mainstream Greek Orthodox Church and even other Old Calendarists (self-styled true Orthodox Christians) consider to be in schism.

As a nun, Mariam was called Mother (and later Abbess) Mariam of Keratea.

=== Foundation of the Pefkovounogiatrissa Monastery (1923–1939) ===
Map of the Panagia Pefkovounogiatrissa Monastery centered at 37°50′14″N 24°02′19″E Soulakiotis' monastery (Greece)

Mariam Soulakiotis, together with the hieromonk Archbishop Matthew Karpathakis of Vresthena, founded the Panagia Pefkovounogiatrissa Monastery in 1927. The monastery is located between the town of Keratea and the rural village of Kaki Thalassa, both located in the municipality of Lavreotiki, in the region of East Attica.

The monastery was officially founded to "honour the Presentation of the Virgin Mary", but Matthew also made clear that the goal of the monastery is to support the nascent Old Calendarist movement financially. At the monastery's founding, Matthew was already 66 years old. Plans for the monastery had been a few years in the making—in April 1925 Soulakiotis acquired an additional seven acres of land, and, later that year, she acquired two more plots of land. Greek author Nina Kouletaki (Note: Greek: Νίνα Κουλετάκη) writes that even having reviewed "long" sympathetic, Matthewite histories of the monastery, there is no legal explanation as to how the nuns acquired the money to make these expensive property purchases.

The monastery's Greek name is occasionally transliterated in English as Pefkovounogiátrissa(s), Peukovoynogiatrissa(s), with or without Panagia(s). The monastery's full Greek name, Ιερά Μονή Εισοδίων Παναγίας Πευκοβουνογιατρίσσης, can be translated as 'Monastery of the Entrance [into the Temple] of the Most Holy Theotokos, the Healer, on the Pine Mountain'. An Australian newspaper, The Sun, translated it in 1954 as "The Convent of the Virgin in the Pines".

Part of the reasoning for its name was that the convent was opened to offer tuberculosis treatment, owing to the purported health benefits of its high-altitude, mountainous locale to those who could not afford conventional treatment. In 1938, the convent began marketing itself as a free-of-charge tuberculosis treatment center.

==== Founding nuns ====
The founding nuns were:

1. Marina (Mariam) Soulakiotou
2. Irini (Evfrosyni) Mendrinou (Note: Greek: Ειρήνη (Ευφροσύνη) Μενδρινού)
3. Maria (Makaria) Tsangari (Note: Greek: Μαρία (Μακαρία) Τσαγκάρη)
4. Panagiota (Dionysia) Vounisakou (Note: Greek: Παναγιώτα (Διονυσία) Βουνισάκου)
5. Maria Fameli (Note: Greek: Μαρία Φαμέλη)
6. Asimina (Xeni) Tampakaki (Note: Greek: Ασημίνα (Ξένη) Ταμπακάκη)
7. Eleni (Synglitiki) Karpathaki (Note: Greek: Ελένη (Συγκλητική) Καρπαθάκη)

== Rise to power ==
While Soulakiotis' official tenure as abbess began in 1950, she had already been doing the work of an abbess since 1939, "assuming full responsibility for the monastery" when 'Archbishop' Matthew was aged 78. Matthew left all day-to-day operations to her, as he was (for some of that time) in prison or away as a hieromonk, seeking spiritual rewards for ascetic monastic practices, such as seeking penance through forty-day fasts, voluntary stays in deprived isolation cells, and tying heavy metal chains to his body to be carried around at all times.

=== Decline of Matthew's health (c. 1939–1950) ===
Matthew's health is said to have begun declining during World War II, leaving him even less able to effectively supervise Soulakiotis, and making him more dependent on her. When Matthew's health started to seriously fail in 1950, Soulakiotis' already considerable influence over him grew exponentially.

Thus, Soulakiotis is sometimes portrayed negatively even in Orthodox histories—one author of such a history, Vladimir Moss, recounts an incident where she is said to have prevented Matthew from saying something on his deathbed to Metropolitan Chrysostomos of Florina, a fellow Old Calendarist bishop, but one with whom he was in schism, after Matthew tried to sit up "out of deference" to Metropolitan Crysostomos and began to try to speak "inaudibly". Allegedly, Soulakiotis then burst into the room with a group of other nuns, demanding Metropolitan Crysostomos and his entourage leave at once. Matthew would die only a few days later, so it is unknown if he wanted to heal the schism with Chrysostomos—a deathbed conversion of sorts.

After Matthew's death, Soulakiotis succeeded him as abbot of the monastery. During this period of her life, she was described and photographed wearing an even more chaste version of the typical epimandylion, a Greek-style black epanokalimavkion worn by Church of Greece nuns of the highest rank (who cannot rise higher as they cannot become ordained priestesses), which entirely covered her forehead and eyebrows.

== Crimes ==
Soulakiotis' alleged modus operandi was to encourage wealthy women to join the convent, and then torture them until they donated their fortunes to the monastery; once the money was donated, Soulakiotis would embezzle it and, in some cases, kill the "donor". Beginning in 1940, after establishing control over the other nuns in the monastery's convent, she was said to have even sent the monastery's monks traveling around Greece in search of wealthy "spinsters, widows, [and] families" to "convert". Reuters reported that, at the time of her arrest, she had amassed three hundred homes and farms across the country in this way, along with "gold and jewels worth thousands of pounds". (£2,000 was equivalent to £59,200 in 2025.) One of her accusers, Eugenia Margheti, (Note: Greek: Ευγενία Μαργέτη) reported that she was held in an isolation cell and tortured until she surrendered property worth ₯118 million (equivalent to €56,500,000 in 2025).

Soulakiotis first came to the attention of police when an anonymous complaint was made by the daughter of a wealthy woman who had willed all her property to the monastery—she insisted that her mother wouldn't have done this without being forced, and accused the monastery's administration of "blackmail and threats".

Soulakiotis further faced police scrutiny when they were searching for an 18-year-old female from Toledo, Ohio, born in Greece, Simela Spyrides, (Note: Greek: Συμέλα Σπυρίδου) who first went missing in 1949. The United States Federal Bureau of Investigation had traced Spyrides to the monastery, and her father, Christo Spyrides, called on the Greek embassy and authorities from Ohio to take action, claiming that his daughter was "lured" to the convent by a nun he identified as "Mariam Zaphriopoulos", who he said had been in the United States to collect property worth US$10,000 left to the monastery. However, the Associated Press reported that Spyrides was able to get into contact with his daughter after their initial reports, omitting whether or not she had been in the convent.

The prosecution further alleged that Soulakiotis' strict adherence to ascetic practices led to the unnecessary deaths of 150 people who had sought treatment, as the monastery was touted as a sanatorium for TB. They also alleged that the only time doctors were allowed on site was to sign death certificates, never to carry out medically supervised treatment of the deadly, communicable lung infection.

Victims of Soulakiotis' administration of the monastery, who were still alive in the 1950s, also variously accused her of torturing, starving, falsely-imprisoning and beating them.

== Arrest ==
More than eighty-five police officers first raided the monastery's grounds on the night of 4 December 1950, accompanied by a deputy prosecutor, a judge, and a coroner, in an operation which lasted overnight. Upon gaining entry, they forcibly removed all thirty-six children on the premises, having to wrest them away from the hands of nuns, to orphanages "where their future was not much better". Police also freed "several half-naked malnourished and sick elderly women tied up in basements", and were disturbed at the poor quality food served to those in the convent.

== Trials ==
Although extremely concerned, due to questions over the voluntary nature of monasticism, the initial charges prosecutors felt they could prove carried light sentences: illegal export of olive oil to Cyprus and illegal import of tires. As more evidence and witness statements came to light, the indictment of Soulakiotis was revised repeatedly.

When Archbishop Spyridon Vlachos of Athens failed to reconcile with Metropolitan Crysostomos of Florina, all Old Calendarist sects in Greece, including the Matthewites, were outlawed in January 1951. The following month, the Public Prosecutor further indicted Soulakiotis, along with thirteen other nuns and monks, on charges including homicide, fraud, forgery of wills, blackmail and torture, with Soulakiotis receiving the harshest indictment.

At her trials, Soulakiotis wore an Orthodox icon depicting the deceased Matthew, who among some Greek Old Calendarists is honored in death—glorified—by referring to him by the posthumous name (Father) "Saint Matthew the New Confessor". (Note: Greek: Ἅγιος Πατήρ Ματθαῖος, ὁ Νέος Ὁμολογητής)

=== Defence arguments ===
At trial, Soulakiotis' attorney, Panos Panayotakos, (Note: Greek: Πάνος Παναγιωτάκος) said in her defence that people surrender all their material property to monasteries when joining as a matter of course (a vow of poverty). (Note: See also Eastern Christian monasticism) He said that the properties were put in Soulakiotis' personal name simply because there was no legal person behind the monastery. In furtherance of their defence, Panayotakos also showed a letter by Field Marshal Harold Alexander, which he claimed thanked the clergy of the Panagia Pefkovounogiatrissa Monastery for heroically risking themselves to aid the escapes of a number of British soldiers during the Axis occupation of Greece during World War II.

=== Specific murders tried ===
Only accounted for in this section are the murders she was convicted of before her death; she had pending unresolved cases. Soulakiotis was found guilty of the following seven murders in particular between her three trials:

Mr. and Mrs. Baka (Note: Greek: Ζεύγος Μπάκα; Zeúgos Báka)
The Baka family, originally having five members—two adults and three children—were convinced by Soulakiotis to join the monastery and, at first, voluntarily surrendered their property. When Mrs. Baka realized the terrible conditions of the monastery, she informed the nuns she wanted to leave with her children. Not willing to part with the considerable wealth owned by the Baka family, Soulakiotis condemned her to live in solitary confinement in a previously-TB-exposed cell for six months, with little food; by the time Mrs. Baka emerged, she fell into a coma and died soon afterwards. Her husband subsequently met the same fate.
Mr. and Mrs. Panagiotopoulou (Note: Greek: Ζεύγος Παναγιωτόπουλου)
The couple were forced to sign-over their home to Soulakiotis; both died of starvation in the monastery.
Ms. Michalakou (Note: Greek: Η Μιχαλάκου)
The woman contracted TB and decided to try the monastery, as it offered sanatorium services; she was given no treatment nor ever seen by a doctor, and locked in a cell where she died after signing over the title to her property.
Sister Theodote (Note: Greek: Μοναχή Θεοδότη; Monachī́ Theodótī)
After being accused of misconduct by Soulakiotis, she was ordered to be beaten as penance. The nuns who carried out Soulakiotis' orders beat her to the point of internal hemorrhaging, leading to her death.
Sister Maria (Note: Greek: Μοναχή Μαρία)
She ended up hospitalized after receiving a similar beating to Sister Theodote, where she died.

=== Verdicts ===
Soulakiotis adamantly denied all the charges against her until her death, deriding them as "satanic fictions". (Note: Greek: «κατασκευάσματα του σατανά»; kataskeuásmata tou sataná) She was said to have accepted all of her criminal sentences "without emotion", only crossing herself and saying a quiet "prayer of vengeance" to "Saint Matthew". (Note: By which she meant the aforementioned Abp. Matthew Karpathakis of Vresthena, not Matthew the Apostle.)

All told, Soulakiotis received three sentences at separate trials: one between 1951–52 and two in 1953, the last one ending mere months before her death. At her first trial, she received a sentence of 26 months; at her second, 10 years concurrently; and at her third, four additional years consecutively.

== Religious following ==
Described as a "cult leader", Soulakiotis had more than 400 followers living in the monastery at the peak of her power. Furthermore, state records showed that five hundred people willed all their property to the monastery and later died in it—which prosecutors asserted was an unusually high number for a legitimately operated monastery of its size.

In 1951, after her arrest, her followers marched in protest at her detention, demanding that their "leaders" be given back to them. This led police to protect the home of Archbishop Spyridon, who they said the Old Calendarists were planning to kidnap in retaliation, with the goal being to hold him hostage until the authorities released Soulakiotis.

== Death ==
Having received multiple different sentences over her three trials adding to a total of fourteen years, Soulakiotis died in Averoff Prison on 23 November 1954. Reports conflict as to her age, but Reuters and Newsbeast give her age upon her death as 71.

After her death, she was buried on the grounds of the convent, near the body of her predecessor, Bishop Matthew Karpathakis.

== Aftermath ==
Even after Soulakiotis' death, her sect continued underground despite having been outlawed; police were investigating cases of "young girls vanishing into thin air" which they believed led to the "rebel Keratea convent" as late as 1959. In 1961, police stated that they did not know who had taken over from Soulakiotis, stating that the monastery's new presumed abbess had "perfected the art of making herself and her pseudo-sacred sisters vanish" without a trace.

As of 2022, the Old Calendarist monastery Soulakiotis once managed, Keratea's Panagia Pefkovounogiatrissa Monastery, remains open and still has members who believe she was innocent and who venerate her as a saint. Old Calendarism is no longer an illegal sect in modern Greece, as standards have improved to a level acceptable to the Greek civil authorities, and, as an EU member, Greek citizens enjoy the freedom of religion.

== Legacy ==
The number of Soulakiotis' victims is a matter of some debate; the most commonly cited figure of 27 murders and 150 negligent homicides from tuberculosis comes from medical testimony during her trial. As during Soulakiotis' day, tuberculosis treatment was still new, and was a problem throughout Greece, it is unclear the degree to which Soulakiotis was involved in the negligent homicides she was convicted of in 1952.

Some modern English-speaking Matthewite writers, such as the priest Constantine Kouris, assert that Soulakiotis was innocent and unjustly tried. At least since 2008, none of the monastery's current nuns were personal witnesses of what took place between the 1930s and the 1950s at the monastery, yet they continue to pray for the intercession of "Holy" (Note: Greek: αγια; agia) Mariam of Keratea all the same, whom they regard as martyred in the cause of Christ.

Explanations in support of her innocence offered by nuns contemporary to Soulakiotis included the idea that male bishops and monks were "jealous" of the wealth and power held by the female Soulakiotis, and were instead guilty of the crimes they accused her of; another is that the number of deaths was simply attributable to the fact that many who joined the monastery "were already old".

According to Nina Kouletaki in her 2019 Greek language treatise on female serial killers, Murderesses, it is only by happenstance that the monastery used the old Julian calendar rather than its revised form; she opines that at the time a cunning, shrewd abbess like Soulakiotis would have had equal success regardless of her brand of Greek Orthodox Christianity. Furthermore, Kouletaki opines that Greek tabloid journalists used the sordid details of Souletakis' convent as a convenient "distraction" from the political chaos of her time.

In his 1992 exhaustive academic listing of female serial killers, Women Serial and Mass Murderers, Kerry Segrave writes that the prosecution "established" to his satisfaction the veracity of the number of victims as being at least 177.

== In popular culture ==
Two episodes of Greek crime drama Anatomy of a Crime were inspired by the case of Soulakiotis, although not directly naming her or the monastery:

S	E	Greek title	Transliterated title	Translated title	Director
1	20	"Καθαρτήριο"	Kathartirio	"Purgatory"	Takis Spetsiotis
2	26	"Η τρίτη εντολή"	I triti entoli	"The Third Commandment"	Panos Kokkinopoulos

In the horror drama series Grotesquerie on FX (2024 to present). In Season 1 Episode 2 one of the main characters (a Catholic nun) names Soulakiotis as their favorite serial killer and briefly tells her story.

In 2025, a film about the event was released called Sound of Silence. The film is considered gothic horror.

== See also ==
- Old Calendarists § Greece
- Timeline of Eastern Orthodoxy in Greece (1924–1974)
- Ekaterini Dimetrea
- Delphine LaLaurie
- Elizabeth Báthory
- Dorothea Puente
- List of serial killers by country
- List of serial killers by number of victims
