= The Newgate Calendar =

True crime register from England

The Newgate Calendar, subtitled The Malefactors' Bloody Register, was a popular collection of moralising stories about sin, crime, and criminals who commit them in England in the 18th and 19th centuries. Originally a monthly bulletin of executions, produced by the Keeper of Newgate Prison in London, the Calendar's title was appropriated by other publishers, who put out biographical chapbooks about notorious criminals such as Sawney Bean, Dick Turpin, and Moll Cutpurse.

== Overview ==
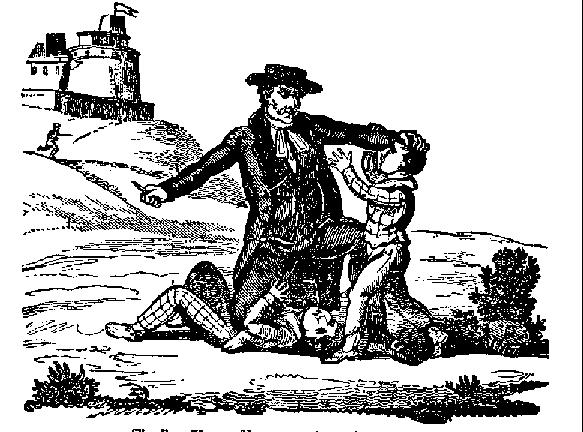
Image of child murderer Thomas Hunter (executed August 1700) from The Newgate Calendar

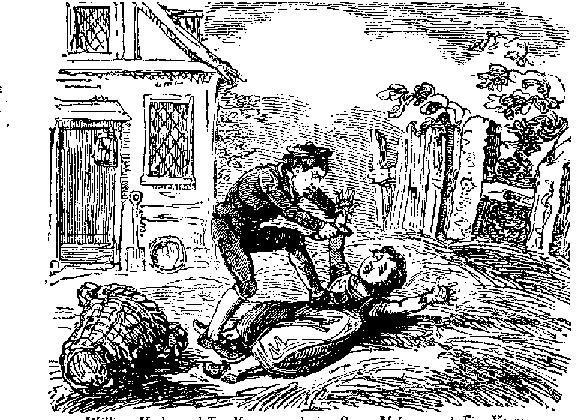
18th-century illustration of William York, age 10, murdering Susan Matthew, age 5, on 13 May 1748, from The Newgate Calendar. York was sentenced to hang but was eventually pardoned.

Collected editions of these stories began to appear in the mid-18th century, and in 1774 a five-volume bound edition became the standard version. While many of its accounts are highly embellished and/or drawn uncritically from other sources, they are lively and full of incident, and often refer to contemporary events and social issues. Along with the Bible and John Bunyan's The Pilgrim's Progress, the Calendar was famously in the top three works most likely to be found in the average home.

The entries editorialise strongly against their subjects, including Catholicism, The Protectorate and Commonwealth, any political enemies of Britain (such as the French), drunkenness, prostitution ("Women of abandoned character"), gambling, "dissipation" in general and other "vices", while eulogising Protestantism, the Church of England, the English monarchy and legal system, the Common Law and Bloody Code, with some rare exceptions. One edition contained an introduction suggesting that swindling be made (another) capital offence.

A new edition in four volumes was published in 1824-26 by Andrew Knapp and William Baldwin, two lawyers, and a further edition in 1826, under the title, The New Newgate Calendar.

A penny dreadful edition of The New Newgate Calendar appeared between 1863 and 1866.

== Influence and legacy ==
The Newgate Calendar had a lasting legacy on early 19th-century crime fiction. Critics believed that the Calendars' publication would inspire copycat criminals and romanticize crime culture.

There was a communal and social element to the stories. According to Henry Mayhew, orphans in common lodging-houses would read the stories out loud in groups.

Spoofs were dubbed "Newgate novels" of the "Newgate school" of literature in a derogatory manner. Oliver Twist, which mentions the Calendar twice, was designated as such by Dickens' contemporary, William Makepeace Thackeray, much to Dickens' chagrin.

Tom Cringle in Michael Scott's novel Tom Cringle's Log apologises for interrupting the pirate smuggler Obed's confessional story, saying "It was not quite the thing to cut you short in the middle of your Newgate Calendar, Obed--beg pardon, your story I mean; no offence now, none in the world--eh?"

Julius Delamayn in Wilkie Collins's novel Man and Wife says to his brother of the Newgate Calendar: "You won't cultivate your mind with such a book as that. Vile actions recorded in vile English, make vile reading, Geoffrey, in every sense of the word."

Thomas Carlyle wrote, in his Life of Friedrich Schiller: "Look at the biography of authors! Except the Newgate Calendar, it is the most sickening chapter in the history of man."
