= Elizabeth Brownrigg =

18th-century English murderer

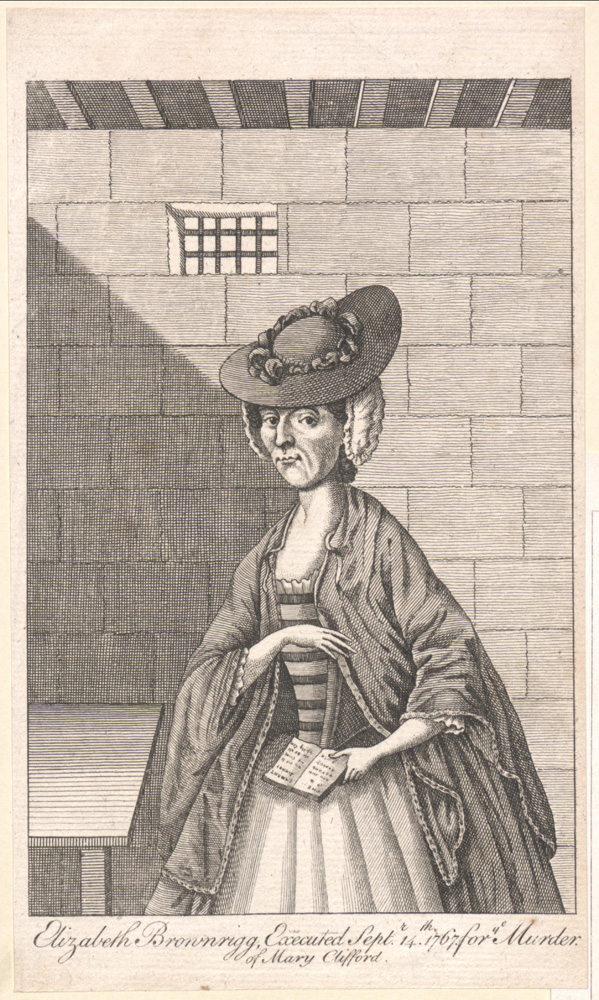
Elizabeth Brownrigg in prison

Elizabeth Brownrigg (c. 1720 – 14 September 1767) was an 18th-century English murderer. Her victim, Mary Clifford, was one of her domestic servants, who died from cumulative injuries and associated infected wounds. As a result of witness testimony and medical evidence at her trial, Brownrigg was hanged at Tyburn on 14 September 1767.

== Early life: c. 1720–1765 ==
Born in about 1720 to a working class family, Elizabeth married James Brownrigg, an apprentice plumber, while still a teenager. She gave birth to sixteen children, but only three survived infancy. In 1765, Elizabeth, James and their son John moved to Flower de Luce Road in London's Fetter Lane. James was prospering from his career as a plumber, and Elizabeth was a respected midwife. As a result of her work, Saint Dunstans Parish appointed her overseer of women and children, and she was given custody of several children as domestic servants from the London Foundling Hospital.

== Foundling Hospital: vocational and educational debate ==
Since Thomas Coram had founded it in 1739, there had been a constant debate about what the station of the Foundling Hospital's young charges should be: whether they were being overeducated, or whether they should be subject to vocational education and trained for apprenticeships, which would lead to future stable lives as domestic servants.

The latter was decided upon, and the Foundling Hospital began to tender older children and young adolescents for vocational training as apprentices in 1759, shortly before the events described in this entry took place. Elizabeth Brownrigg was not the only abusive adult who used hapless children as slave labor, however, as contemporary accounts indicate. After the events described in this entry, the Foundling Hospital instituted greater safeguards of oversight for apprenticeship tendering, and reported cases of apprentice abuse dropped considerably.

== Abuse of servants: 1765–1767 ==
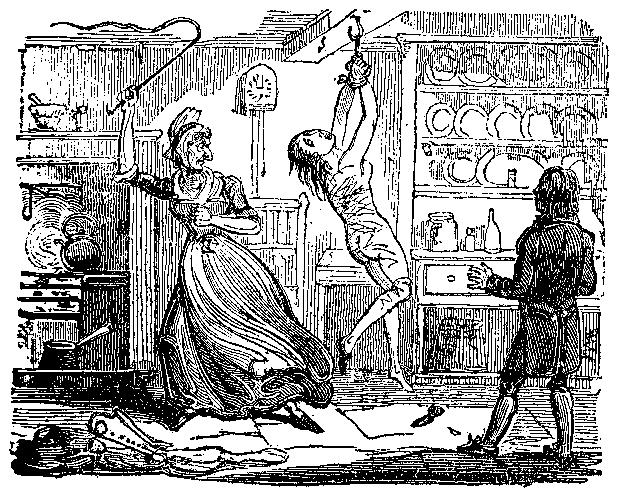
Illustration of Elizabeth Brownrigg flogging Mary Clifford from the Newgate Calendar

Little biographical information is available to explain her subsequent behavior. However, Elizabeth Brownrigg proved ill-suited to the task of caring for her foundling domestic servants and soon began to engage in severe physical abuse. This often involved stripping her young charges naked, chaining them to wooden beams or pipes, and then whipping them severely with switches, bullwhip handles and other implements for the slightest infraction of her rules. Mary Jones, one of her earlier charges, ran away from her house and sought sanctuary with the London Foundling Hospital. After a medical examination, the Governors of the London Foundling Hospital demanded that James Brownrigg keep his wife's abusive tendencies in check, but enforced no further action.

Heedless of this reprimand, Brownrigg also severely abused two other domestic servants, Mary Mitchell and Mary Clifford. Like Jones before her, Mitchell sought refuge from the abusive behavior of her employer, but John Brownrigg forced her to return to Flower de Luce Road. Clifford was entrusted to Brownrigg's care, despite the Governors' earlier concerns about her abusive behaviour towards her charges. As a result, Brownrigg engaged in more excessive punishment towards Clifford. She was kept naked, forced to sleep on a mat inside a coal hole, and when she forced open cupboards for food because she was fed only bread and water, Elizabeth Brownrigg repeatedly beat her for a day's duration, chained to a roof beam in her kitchen.

By June 1767 Mitchell and Clifford were experiencing infection of their untreated wounds, and Brownrigg's repeated assaults gave them no time to heal. Beginning to suspect something was awry, Brownrigg's neighbours asked the London Foundling Hospital to further investigate the premises. As a result, Brownrigg yielded Mary Mitchell, but Foundling Hospital Inspector Grundy then demanded to know where Clifford was, and took James Brownrigg prisoner, although Elizabeth and John Brownrigg escaped.

Public feeling ran high against the Brownriggs, ensuring their capture would be swift. In Wandsworth, a chandler recognised the fugitives, and the trio stood trial in the Old Bailey in August 1767.

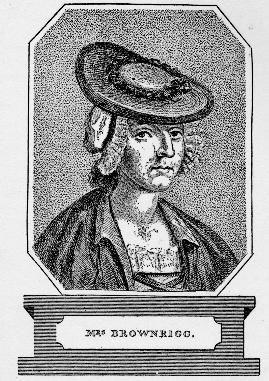
Portrait of Elizabeth Brownrigg

== Trial and execution: August–September 1767 ==
By this time, Mary Clifford had succumbed to her infected wounds, and Elizabeth Brownrigg was charged with her murder. At the trial, Mary Mitchell testified against her former employer, as did Grundy and an apprentice of James Brownrigg. Medical evidence and autopsy results indicated that Brownrigg's repeated assaults and negligence of Clifford's injuries had contributed to the fourteen-year-old's death, so Elizabeth Brownrigg was sentenced to hang at Tyburn and her corpse be publicly dissected. John and James were both acquitted, but were promptly detained under a separate indictment for abusing Mary Mitchell. The two were found guilty and were each sentenced to six months in prison. While awaiting execution, Elizabeth expressed remorse and prayed for salvation. Crowds condemned her on the way to her execution, spitting and shouting at her.

"On her way to the place of execution the people expressed their abhorrence of her crime in terms which, though not proper for the occasion, testified their astonishment that such a wretch could have existed: they even prayed for her damnation instead of her salvation: they doubted not but that 'the devil would fetch her,' and hoped that 'she would go to hell.' Such were the sentiments of the mob."

Even sixty years later, The Newgate Calendar crime periodical still bore testimony to the impression that Elizabeth Brownrigg's crimes had made on Georgian and Victorian England.

== See also ==
- Child abuse
- Domestic violence
- Physical abuse
- Sadism

== General references ==
- Elizabeth Brownrigg: Executed for Torturing Her Female Apprentices to Death (from the Newgate Calendar, Volume 2: 1825: 369–374:
- James Brownrigg, His Wife Elizabeth and Their Son John: Killing: Murder, Killing: Murder, 9 September 1767: The Proceedings of the Old Bailey Ref. t17670909:The Proceedings of the Old Bailey, London 1674 to 1834:
- Old Bailey Proceedings Online, Trial of James, Elizabeth and John Brownrigg. (t17670909-1, 9 September 1767).

== Bibliography ==
- Marthe Jocelyn: A Home for Foundlings: Toronto: Tundra Books: 2005: ISBN 0-88776-709-5
- Ruth McClure: Coram's Children: The London Foundling Hospital in the Eighteenth Century: New Haven: Yale University Press: 1981: ISBN 0-300-02465-7
- Patty Seleski: "A Mistress, A Mother and A Murderess Too: Elizabeth Brownrigg and the Social Construction of the Eighteenth Century Mistress" in Katherine Kitredge (ed): Lewd and Notorious: Female Transgression in the Eighteenth Century: Ann Arbor: University of Michigan Press: 2003: ISBN 0-472-08906-4
- Kristina Straub: "The Tortured Apprentice: Sexual Monstrosity and the Suffering of Poor Children in the Brownrigg Murder Case" (p. 66–81) in Laura Rosenthal and Mita Choudhary (ed) Monstrous Dreams of Reason: London: Associated Universities Presses: 2002: ISBN 0838754600
- Lisa Zunshine: Bastards and Foundlings: Illegitimacy in Eighteenth Century England: Columbus: Ohio State University Press: 2005: ISBN 0-8142-0995-5
