= Gasoline direct injection =

Mixture formation system

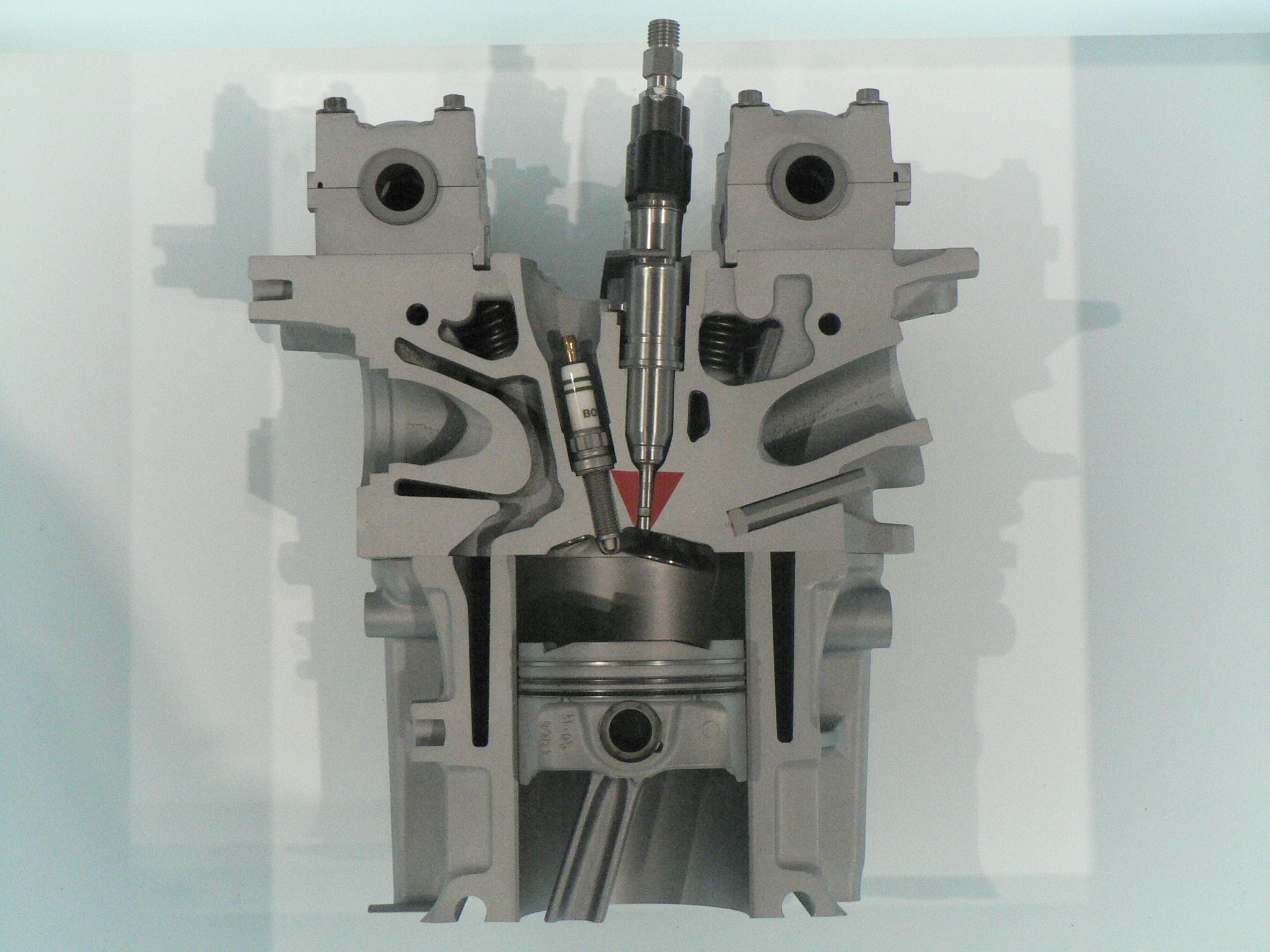
GDI engine from a BMW car showing a fuel injector (located above the red triangle) placed to spray gasoline directly into the combustion chamber

Gasoline direct injection (GDI), also known as petrol direct injection (PDI), is a fuel injection system for internal combustion engines that run on gasoline. It injects fuel directly into the combustion chamber, unlike manifold injection systems, which inject fuel into the intake manifold so that it mixes with the incoming airstream before reaching the combustion chamber.

Use of GDI can improve engine efficiency and specific power output, and can also reduce exhaust emissions from vehicles.

The first production engine to use GDI was the Swedish Hesselman engine, a low-compression multi-fuel spark-ignition design that was more efficient than traditional carbureted engines. It could also run on diesel, kerosene, ethanol and tar oil. Because gasoline was more expensive than less-refined fuels, it was usually only used for starting; once running, the engine was switched to a cheaper fuel.

Introduced in 1925, the Hesselman engine was used by truck and heavy equipment manufacturers in Sweden and by stationary engine and heavy vehicle manufacturers in the United States throughout the 1940s. The first mass-produced GDI engine to use Bosch's mechanical fuel injection system (the same type used in pre-chambers in diesel engines) was the DB601 V12 for the Messerschmitt Bf 109 in 1936.

Use of the Bosch mechanical fuel injection system in a direct-injection configuration allowed the Germans to employ extremely high compression ratios and very high-pressure forced induction to produce high power reliably from low-quality gasoline with an octane rating of only 87. In addition, the fighter's engine did not stall in negative‑G turns, unlike carbureted engines such as the Rolls-Royce Merlin.

Conventionally charged engines not only required 100–200 octane avgas to achieve the same power levels as the DB601 and later DB605, but fighters using the Merlin and other carbureted solutions were vulnerable to tactics that forced the pilot into a negative‑G turn to avoid being shot down. The resulting loss of engine power could lead to the aircraft's loss in such situations. Rolls-Royce was able to correct this problem late in the war, around late 1943.

Several German cars used a Bosch mechanical GDI system in the 1950s. However, use of the technology remained rare until 1996, when Mitsubishi introduced an electronic GDI system for its mass-produced vehicles.

Since then, GDI has been adopted widely by the automotive industry, increasing in the United States from 2.3% of production for model year 2008 vehicles to approximately 50% for model year 2016.

== Operating principle ==
=== Charge modes ===
The "charge mode" of a direct-injected engine refers to how the fuel is distributed throughout the combustion chamber:

- In homogeneous charge mode, the fuel is evenly mixed with air throughout the combustion chamber, similar to manifold injection.
- In stratified charge mode, there is a zone with a higher fuel density around the spark plug and a leaner mixture (lower fuel density) further away from the spark plug.

==== Homogeneous charge mode ====
In the homogeneous charge mode, the engine operates on a homogeneous air–fuel mixture ($\lambda = 1$), meaning that there is an (almost) perfect mixture of fuel and air in the cylinder. The fuel is injected at the very beginning of the intake stroke to give it the maximum time to mix with the air, so that a homogeneous mixture is formed. This mode allows use of a conventional three-way catalyst for exhaust gas treatment.

Compared with manifold injection, fuel efficiency is only slightly increased, but the specific power output is better, which is why homogeneous mode is useful for engine downsizing. Most direct-injected passenger car gasoline engines use homogeneous charge mode.

==== Stratified charge mode ====
In stratified charge mode, a small zone of fuel–air mixture is created around the spark plug, surrounded by air in the rest of the cylinder. This means less fuel is injected into the cylinder overall, leading to very high air–fuel ratios of $\lambda > 8$, with mean air–fuel ratios of $\lambda = 3...5$ at medium load, and $\lambda = 1$ at full load. Ideally, the throttle valve remains open as much as possible to avoid throttling losses. Torque is then controlled solely by changing the amount of injected fuel (quality torque control), rather than varying the amount of intake air. Stratified charge mode also keeps the flame away from the cylinder walls, reducing thermal losses.

Since mixtures that are too lean cannot be ignited with a spark plug (due to the lack of fuel), the charge must be stratified, i.e., a small zone of fuel–air mixture must be created around the spark plug. To achieve this, a stratified charge engine injects fuel during the later stages of the compression stroke. A "swirl cavity" in the top of the piston is often used to direct the fuel into the zone surrounding the spark plug. This technique enables the use of ultra-lean mixtures that would be impossible with carburetors or conventional manifold fuel injection.

Stratified charge mode (also called "ultra lean-burn" mode) is used at low loads to reduce fuel consumption and exhaust emissions. At higher loads, it is disabled, and the engine switches to homogeneous mode with a stoichiometric air–fuel ratio of $\lambda = 1$ at moderate loads, and a richer mixture at higher loads.

In theory, stratified charge mode can further improve fuel efficiency and reduce exhaust emissions. In practice, however, it has not shown significant efficiency advantages over a conventional homogeneous charge concept. Its inherent lean burn forms higher levels of nitrogen oxides, sometimes requiring a NOx adsorber in the exhaust system to meet emissions regulations. NOx adsorbers can require low-sulfur fuels, since sulfur prevents them from functioning properly. GDI engines with stratified fuel injection can also produce higher quantities of particulate matter than manifold-injected engines, sometimes requiring particulate filters in the exhaust (similar to a diesel particulate filter) to meet vehicle emissions regulations. As a result, several European car manufacturers have abandoned the stratified charge concept or never adopted it. For example, the 2000 Renault 2.0 IDE gasoline engine (F5R) never used stratified charge mode. The 2009 BMW N55 and 2017 Mercedes-Benz M256 engines dropped the stratified charge mode used by their predecessors. The Volkswagen Group used fuel stratified injection in naturally aspirated engines labeled FSI, but these engines received an engine control unit update that disabled stratified charge mode. Turbocharged Volkswagen engines labeled TFSI and TSI have always used homogeneous mode. Like these Volkswagen engines, most newer direct-injected gasoline engines (from 2017 onwards) use homogeneous charge mode in conjunction with variable valve timing to achieve good efficiency. Stratified charge concepts have mostly been abandoned.

=== Injection modes ===
Common techniques for creating the desired distribution of fuel throughout the combustion chamber are spray-guided, air-guided, and wall-guided injection. A trend is towards spray-guided injection, since it currently offers higher fuel efficiency.

==== Wall-guided direct injection ====
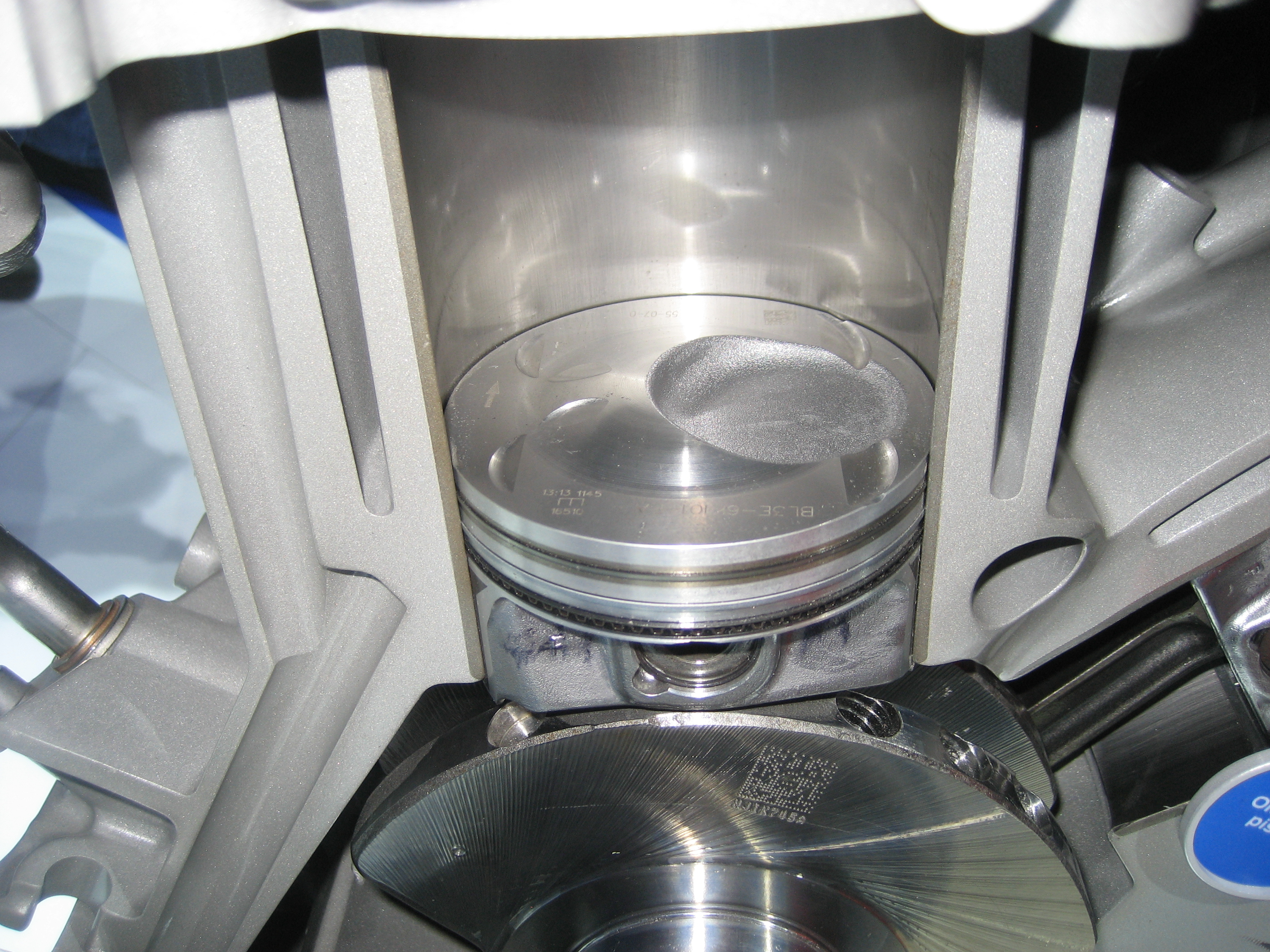
Swirl cavity recessed into the top of a piston in the 2010–2017 Ford EcoBoost 3.5 L engine

In wall-guided injection engines, the distance between the spark plug and the injection nozzle is relatively large. To get the fuel close to the spark plug, it is sprayed into a swirl cavity at the top of the piston (as seen in the picture of the Ford EcoBoost engine), which guides the fuel toward the spark plug. Special swirl or tumble intake ports assist this process. Injection timing depends on piston speed; therefore, at higher piston speeds, injection and ignition timing must be advanced very precisely. At low engine temperatures, some of the fuel that impinges on the relatively cold piston cools down so much that it cannot combust properly. When switching from low engine load to medium engine load (and thus advancing injection timing), some of the fuel may end up being injected behind the swirl cavity, again causing incomplete combustion. Engines with wall-guided direct injection can therefore suffer from high hydrocarbon emissions.

==== Air-guided direct injection ====
In air-guided injection systems, as with wall-guided systems, the distance between the spark plug and injection nozzle is relatively large. However, the fuel does not contact relatively cold engine parts, such as the cylinder walls and pistons. Instead of being sprayed against a swirl cavity, the fuel is guided toward the spark plug solely by the intake air. The intake air must therefore have a specific swirl or tumble motion to direct the fuel toward the spark plug, and this motion must be maintained long enough to push all of the fuel into the spark plug region. This requirement reduces the engine's charging efficiency and, in turn, its power output. In practice, a combination of air-guided and wall-guided injection is usually used. Only one engine is known to rely solely on air-guided injection.

==== Spray-guided direct injection ====
In engines with spray-guided direct injection, the distance between the spark plug and injection nozzle is relatively small. Both are located between the cylinder's valves. Fuel is injected during the later stages of the compression stroke, resulting in very rapid, inhomogeneous mixture formation. This creates large stratification gradients, with a central region that has a very low air ratio and outer regions with a very high air ratio. The fuel can be ignited only in the intermediate zone between these two regions. Ignition occurs almost immediately after injection, improving engine efficiency. The spark plug must be placed so that it is located precisely in the zone where the mixture is ignitable. As a result, production tolerances must be very tight, since small misalignments can drastically reduce combustion quality. The fuel cools the spark plug immediately before it is exposed to combustion heat, so the spark plug must withstand significant thermal shocks. At low piston (and engine) speeds, the relative air–fuel velocity is low, which can prevent proper vaporization and result in a very rich mixture. Rich mixtures do not combust properly and cause carbon build-up. At high piston speeds, fuel is spread further within the cylinder, which can move the ignitable parts of the mixture so far from the spark plug that it can no longer ignite the mixture.

=== Companion technologies ===
Other technologies used to complement GDI in creating a stratified charge include variable valve timing, variable valve lift, and variable length intake manifold. Exhaust gas recirculation can also be used to reduce the high nitrogen oxide (NOx) emissions that can result from ultra-lean combustion.

=== Disadvantages ===
Gasoline direct injection does not provide the valve-cleaning action that occurs when fuel is introduced upstream of the cylinder. In non-GDI engines, gasoline traveling through the intake port acts as a cleaning agent for contamination such as atomized oil. The lack of this cleaning action can cause increased carbon deposits in GDI engines. Third-party manufacturers sell oil catch tanks intended to prevent or reduce these deposits.

The ability to produce peak power at high engine speeds (RPM) is more limited in GDI engines, since there is less time available to inject the required fuel quantity. In manifold injection systems (as well as carburetors and throttle-body fuel injection), fuel can be added to the intake air mixture at any time. Still, a GDI engine is limited to injecting fuel during the intake and compression phases. This becomes a restriction at high RPM, when each combustion cycle is shorter. To overcome this limitation, some GDI engines (such as the Toyota 2GR-FSE V6 and Volkswagen EA888 I4 engines) also have a set of manifold fuel injectors to provide additional fuel at high RPM. These manifold injectors also help to clean carbon deposits from the intake system.

Gasoline does not provide the same level of lubrication for injector components as diesel, which can limit the injection pressures used in GDI engines. Injection pressure in a GDI engine is therefore typically limited to approximately 20 MPa (2.9 ksi) to prevent excessive injector wear.

=== Adverse climate and health impacts ===
Although GDI technology is credited with boosting fuel efficiency and reducing CO_{2} emissions, GDI engines produce more black carbon aerosols than traditional port-fuel-injection engines. Black carbon is a strong absorber of solar radiation and has significant climate-warming properties.

In a study published in January 2020 in the journal Environmental Science and Technology, a research team at the University of Georgia (USA) predicted that the increase in black carbon emissions from GDI-powered vehicles will increase climate warming in urban areas of the U.S. by an amount that significantly exceeds the cooling associated with reduced CO_{2} emissions. The researchers also concluded that the shift from traditional port fuel injection (PFI) engines to GDI technology will nearly double the premature mortality rate associated with vehicle emissions, from 855 deaths annually in the United States to 1,599. They estimated the annual social cost of these premature deaths at $5.95 billion.

== History ==
=== 1912 ===
One of the early inventors to experiment with gasoline direct injection was Archibald Low, who gave his engine the misleading title Forced Induction Engine. However, only the admission of the fuel was forced. He revealed details of his prototype engine early in 1912, and the design was further developed by the large-scale engine builder F. E. Baker Ltd during 1912. The results were displayed on their stand at the Olympia Motor Cycle show in November 1912. The engine was a high-compression four-stroke motorcycle engine, with gasoline separately pressurized to 1000 psi and admitted into the cylinder "at the moment of highest compression" by a small rotary valve, with simultaneous ignition by a spark plug and trembler coil allowing sparking to continue throughout combustion. The injected fuel was described as being in the vapor phase, having been heated by the engine cylinder. Fuel pressure was regulated at the fuel pump, and the amount of fuel admitted was controlled mechanically at the rotary admission valve. This radical design does not appear to have been taken further by F.E. Baker.

=== 1916–1938 ===
Although direct injection has only become common in gasoline engines since 2000, diesel engines have used direct injection into the combustion chamber (or a pre-combustion chamber) since the first successful prototype in 1894.

An early prototype of a GDI engine was built in Germany in 1916 for a Junkers airplane. The engine was initially designed as a diesel, but was redesigned for gasoline after the German Ministry of War decreed that aircraft engines must run on either gasoline or benzene. Because it was a crankcase-compression two-stroke design, a misfire could destroy the engine, so Junkers developed a GDI system to prevent this. A demonstration of the prototype engine for aviation officials was performed shortly before development ceased at the end of World War I.

The Hesselman engine is a hybrid design that was in production by various manufacturers from 1925 to 1951. In a Hesselman engine, fuel is not injected during the suction stroke along with the air, as in a conventional Otto cycle engine, but is instead injected during the compression stroke shortly before the spark. Hesselman engines could use a wide variety of fuels, including gasoline, but generally ran on conventional diesel fuels.

=== 1939–1995 ===
During World War II, most German aircraft engines used GDI, such as the BMW 801 radial engine, the inverted V12 Daimler-Benz DB 601, DB 603, and DB 605 engines, and the similarly laid-out Junkers Jumo 210G, Jumo 211, and Jumo 213 inverted V12 engines. Allied aircraft engines that used GDI included the Soviet Shvetsov ASh-82FNV radial engine and the American 54.9 L Wright R-3350 Duplex Cyclone 18-cylinder radial engine. ... The German company Bosch had been developing a mechanical GDI system for cars since the 1930s. In 1952, this system was introduced on the two-stroke engines in the Goliath GP700 and Gutbrod Superior. It used a high-pressure, direct-injection diesel pump with an intake throttle valve. These engines delivered good performance and up to 30% lower fuel consumption than the carburetor versions, primarily under low engine loads. An added benefit was a separate tank for engine oil, which was automatically mixed with fuel, eliminating the need for owners to prepare their own two-stroke fuel blends. The 1954 Mercedes-Benz 300 SL also used an early Bosch mechanical GDI system, becoming the first four-stroke engine to use GDI.

During the 1970s, United States manufacturers American Motors Corporation (AMC) and Ford developed prototype mechanical GDI systems called Straticharge and Programmed Combustion (PROCO), respectively. The Straticharge system automatically responded to airflow and load demands of the modified AMC Hornet I6 engine using two separate fuel-control pressures supplied to two sets of continuous-flow injectors. Neither system reached production.

=== 1997–present ===
In mid-1996, the Japanese-market Mitsubishi Galant received a GDI version of the Mitsubishi 4G93 inline-four engine. It was brought to Europe in 1997 in the Carisma. Mitsubishi also developed the second six-cylinder GDI engine (after the M198 engine introduced in the Mercedes-Benz 300 SL in 1954), the Mitsubishi 6G74 V6, in 1997. Mitsubishi applied this technology widely, producing over one million GDI engines in four families by 2001. Although the technology had been in use for many years, on 11 September 2001 MMC claimed a trademark for the acronym "GDI". Several other Japanese and European manufacturers introduced GDI engines in the following years. Mitsubishi GDI technology was also licensed by Peugeot, Citroën, Hyundai, Volvo, and Volkswagen.

The 2005 Toyota 2GR-FSE V6 engine was the first to combine both direct and indirect injection. The system (called "D-4S") uses two fuel injectors per cylinder—a traditional low-pressure manifold injector and a high-pressure direct injector—and is used in most Toyota engines. In Formula One racing, direct injection was made compulsory for the 2014 season, with regulation 5.10.2 stating: "There may only be one direct injector per cylinder and no injectors are permitted upstream of the intake valves or downstream of the exhaust valves."

== In two-stroke engines ==
GDI offers additional benefits for two-stroke engines related to scavenging of exhaust gases and lubrication of the crankcase.

Most two-stroke engines have both intake and exhaust ports open during the exhaust stroke to improve flushing of exhaust gases from the cylinder. As a result, some of the fuel–air mixture entering the cylinder exits unburned through the exhaust port. With direct injection, only air (and usually some oil) comes from the crankcase, and fuel is not injected until the piston rises and all ports are closed.

Crankcase lubrication in two-stroke GDI engines is achieved by injecting oil into the crankcase, resulting in lower oil consumption than the older method of injecting oil mixed with fuel into the crankcase.

Two types of GDI are used in two-strokes: low-pressure air-assisted and high-pressure. The low-pressure systems—as used on the 1992 Aprilia SR50 motor scooter—use a crankshaft-driven air compressor to inject air into the cylinder head. A low-pressure injector then sprays fuel into the combustion chamber, where it vaporizes as it mixes with the compressed air. Another example of low-pressure direct injection is Mercury Marine's OptiMax range of outboards, which were discontinued in 2018.

A high-pressure GDI system was developed by German company Ficht GmbH in the 1990s and introduced for marine engines by Outboard Marine Corporation (OMC) in 1997 to meet stricter emissions regulations. However, these engines had reliability problems and OMC declared bankruptcy in December 2000. The Evinrude E-Tec is an improved version of the Ficht system, released in 2003, which won an EPA Clean Air Excellence Award in 2004.

Envirofit International, an American non-profit organisation, has developed direct injection retrofit kits for two-stroke motorcycles (using technology developed by Orbital Corporation Limited) in a project to reduce air pollution in Southeast Asia. The approximately 100 million two-stroke taxis and motorcycles in Southeast Asia are a major source of regional pollution.

== See also ==
- Common rail
- Diesel engine
- Fuel injection
- Gasoline
