= IP Australia =

Australian government agency

Agency overview
- Formed: 25 February 1998; 28 years ago
- Jurisdiction: Australian Government
- Employees: 1,053 (FY21–22)
- Minister responsible: Tim Ayres, Minister for Industry and Innovation, Minister for Science
- Agency executives: Michael Schwager, Director-General; Paula Adamson, Deputy Director-General; Margaret Tregurtha, Deputy Director-General
- Parent agency: Department of Industry, Science and Resources
- Website: ipaustralia.gov.au

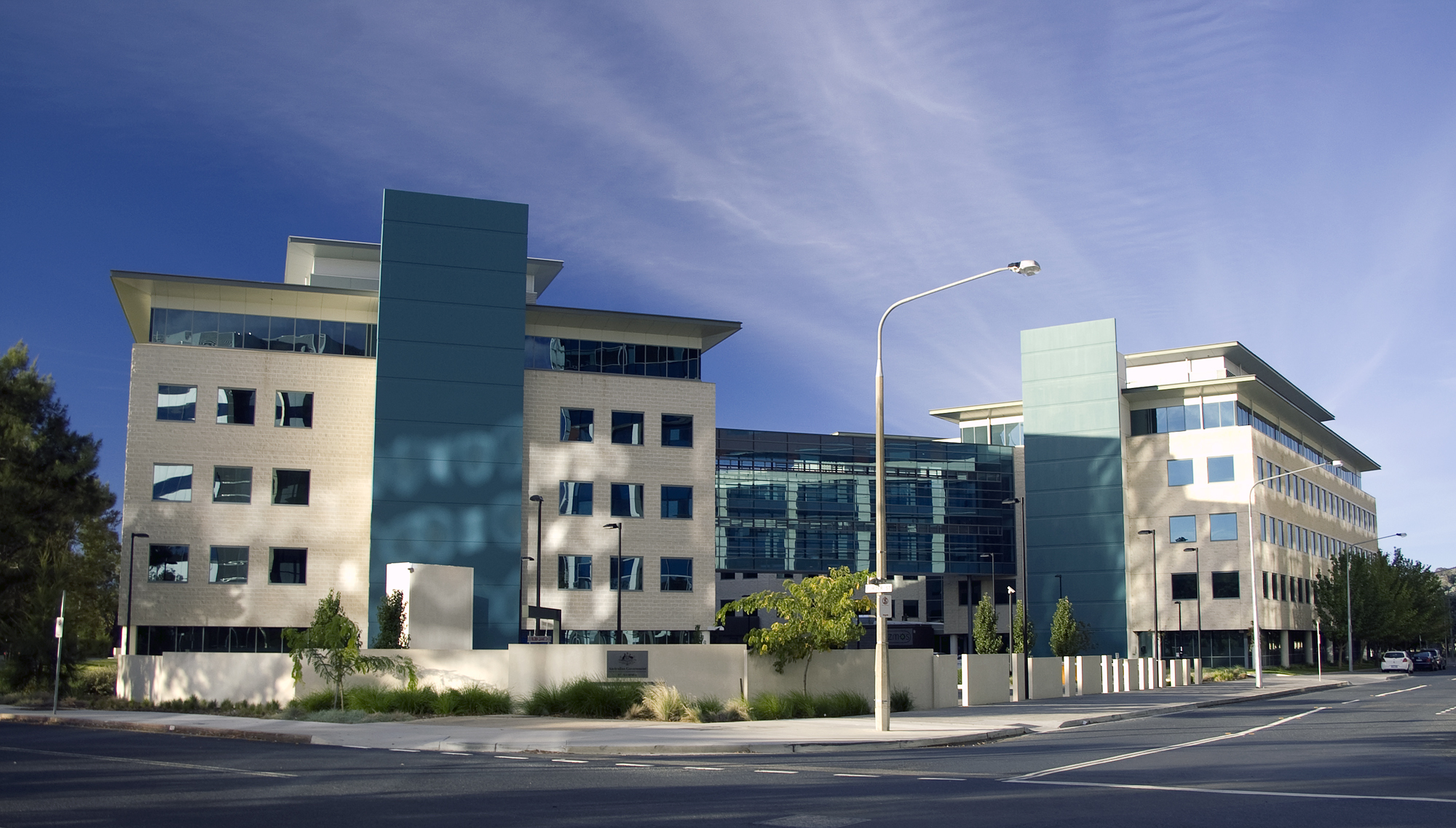
Discovery House, the headquarters of IP Australia in Canberra, Australian Capital Territory, Australia

IP Australia is an Australian Government agency, responsible for administering intellectual property law in Australia. The agency manages the registration of patents, trade marks, registered designs and plant breeder's rights in Australia. The agency sits under the Department of Industry, Science and Resources. From 1904 until 1998, the responsible government agency was called the Australian Patent Office (APO), which is now a division within IP Australia. The headquarters are located at Discovery House in Canberra, Australia, with offices in some capital cities. IP Australia has been an International Searching Authority (ISA) and International Preliminary Examining Authority (IPEA) for patent applications filed in accordance with the Patent Co-operation Treaty since 31 March 1980. Australia is also a member of the Madrid system for trade marks, the Paris Convention for designs and the UPOV for plant breeder's rights.

== Statutory basis ==
IP Australia exercises its authority under a number of Commonwealth laws:

- Patents Act 1990
- Patents Regulations 1991
- Trade Marks Act 1995 (except Part 13 which the Australian Border Force administers)
- Trade Marks Regulations 1995
- Designs Act 2003
- Designs Regulations 2004
- Plant Breeder's Rights Act 1994
- Plant Breeder's Rights Regulations 1994

== Patent examiners ==
Patent examiners are generally scientists and engineers who do not necessarily hold law degrees but have received legal training in patent law. "A patent examiner is hired based on their technical expertise, their professional qualifications and possibly their industry experience. They then undergo training within the office, and we use competency based training. An examiner will take somewhere between 12 to possibly 18 months to become what is called an acceptance delegate. That means they are assessed to be competent to assess a patent application and make a decision about it qualifying or satisfying all of the legislative provisions." [June 2009].

"If you have not attained the Commissioner of Patents Acceptance Delegation within two years of the date on which you commence duties, you may have failed to meet a condition of your engagement, failed to complete your entry-level training courses and you may lack an essential qualification for the performance of your duties. Consequently, it is likely that immediate action will be taken to terminate your employment." [October 2010]

"APO is pursuing a medium-term strategy of continuing to engage patent examiners so that we can reduce that backlog during a time when our work is a little bit quieter, so that when economic activity picks up again we will be well placed. That is adding to our costs for patent examiners, in particular where we have continued to recruit." [June 2009]

To be an ISA, APO must have "at least 100 full-time employees with sufficient technical qualifications to carry out searches." [PCT Reg. 36.1 (i)]

== Notable Australian patents ==
- On 4 August 1868, Thomas Sutcliffe Mort and Eugene Nicolle filed Victorian Patent 1139 for "Refrigeration".
- On 25 March 1885 Hugh Victor McKay filed Victorian Patent 4006 for a "Sunshine Stripper Harvester".
- On 13 February 1904 the first Federal Australian Patent Application was filed by Andrew Brown McKenzie for "Improvements in air leak preventative for Westinghouse and like brakes.".
- On 21 December 1914 George Julius filed Australian Patent 15133/14 for an "Automatic Totalizator".
- On 22 November 1926 Hume filed Australian Patent 4843/26 for the "Spun Concrete Pipe".
- On 10 September 1947 George Shepherd filed Australian Patent 136548 [Application 15008/47] for Furniture Castors.
- On 2 May 1955 Mervyn Victor Richardson filed Australian Patent 212130 [Application 8770/55] for the Victa lawn mower.
- On 22 March 1956 Lance Hill filed Australian Patent 215772 [Application 16938/56] for a fold-away handle design for the Hills rotary clothes hoist.
- On 6 July 1970 Ralph Sarich filed Australian Patent 467415 [Application 30650/71] for "An Improved Rotary Motor", which later became known as the "Sarich orbital engine".
- On 3 November 1977 The University of Melbourne filed Australian Patent 519851 [Application 41061/78] for "A Prothesis to Simulate Neural Endings", invented by I. C. Forster. This became known as the "Cochlear Bionic Ear".
- On 7 May 1982 Arthur Ernest Bishop filed Australian Patent 552975 [Application 15178/83] for "Rack and pinion Steering Gear". This became known as the "Bishop Steering Gear".
- On 6 July 1982 Norport Pty. Ltd filed Australian Patent Application 85668/82 for "Yacht Keel With Fins Near Tip", invented by Ben Lexcen. This became known as the "Winged keel" and was used on Alan Bond's Australia II yacht during its successful challenge to the America's Cup in 1983.
- On 13 October 1986 Norman Thomas Jennings filed Australian Patent Application 35064/71 for "Pelletted Poultry Manure Fertilizer" that later became more commonly known as "Dynamic Lifter".
- On 19 July 1991, CSL Limited and The University of Queensland filed Australian Patent 651727 [Application 23666/92] for "Papilloma Virus Vaccine", invented by Ian Frazer and Jian Zhou. This vaccine for cervical cancer is known as "Gardasil" or "Cervarix".
- On 27 November 1992, the CSIRO filed Australian Patent 666411 [Application 51806/93] for "A Wireless LAN", invented by John David O'Sullivan, Graham Ross Daniels, Terence Michael Paul Percival, Diethelm Ironi Ostry and John Fraser Deane.
- On 11 August 1995, Myriad Genetics, Inc. filed Australian Patent 686004 [Application 1995033212] for "In vivo mutations and polymorphisms in the 17q-linked breast and ovarian cancer susceptibility gene", invented by Donna M Shattuck-Eidens, Jacques Simard, Mitsuru Emi, Francine Durocher and Yusuke Nakamura. The patent claims the human BRCA1 gene. This patent provided the opportunity to test the legal validity of gene patents in the US. The US court held that composition patents were invalid, essentially because they are products of nature. This patent has yet to be tested in Australia.
- On 24 May 2001, John Michael Keogh filed Australian Patent 2001100012 for "Circular Transportation Facilitation Device". This was, in simple fact, the wheel. IP Australia was awarded an Ig Nobel Prize in 2001 for granting this patent for one of the world's oldest known inventions. The patent was thereafter revoked on 30 August 2001.

== Operational issues ==
=== Innovation patents ===
In 2001, the Australian Patent Office within IP Australia introduced a system that immediately granted "innovation patents" for applications which pass a formalities test. Innovation patents are aimed at providing protection for short market life products. To demonstrate the absurdity of the system, an innovation patent application was filed for the wheel and granted automatically by IP Australia. The applicant, lawyer John Keogh, was awarded an Ig Nobel Prize (a satirical award within the fields of STEM for things that are unusual, imaginative or goofy) for his patent of the wheel.

== See also ==
- Australian patent law
- List of Ig Nobel Prize winners
- Patent office
