= SR50 =

SR50 may refer to:

- Aprilia SR50, an Italian built scooter
- Simson SR50, an east-German built scooter; see Simson (company)
- TI SR-50, a calculator
- Knight's Armament Company (KAC) SR-50, a .50 caliber semi-automatic sniper rifle designed by Eugene Stoner
- State Road 50 or State Route 50; see List of highways numbered 50
