= OptiMax =

Mercury Marine's two-stroke direct injection technology

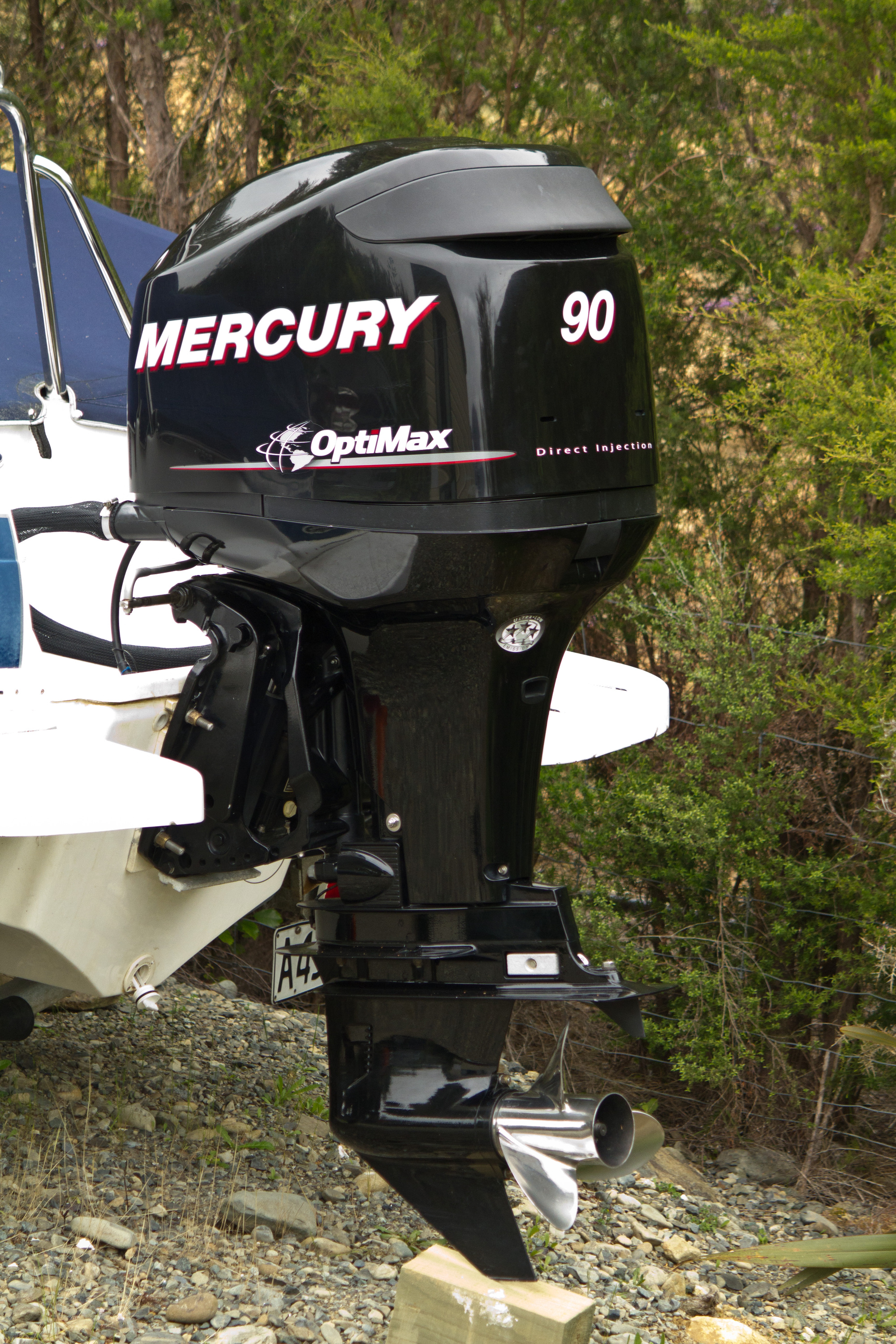
A 2008 Mercury OptiMax 90 hp outboard.

OptiMax is the brand name of Mercury Marine's two-stroke direct injection engine technology used on a range of outboard motors that were in production between 1996 and 2018. The engines were superseded by four-stroke engines, mainly due to increasingly strict emission standards in many major markets. OptiMax engines belong to a family of marine direct injection technologies which includes Evinrude's E-TEC, Yamaha's HPDI (high-pressure direct injection), and Tohatsu's TLDI (two-stroke low-pressure direct injection) engines.

OptiMax's direct injection technology provides much improved fuel efficiency and lower emissions compared to traditional two-stroke engines because the engine management system injects fuel after the exhaust port is closed. Oil is also injected into the engine when, and at the quantity required, which results in very low oil consumption, burn, and very rarely visible smoke. Because OptiMax outboards retained most of the simplicity of traditional two-stroke engines and fewer components than their four-stroke peers, they are lightweight and have a reputation for high performance, especially out-of-the-hole acceleration.

Four engine displacements were offered, with the V6 engines being first on the market with the smaller and less powerful inline 3 cylinder engines joining the range at a later date. From 2001 onwards, OptiMax engines have a distinctive wave-like top cowling.

== Models ==
Engine	Displacement	Power & model
Inline 3 cylinder	1526 cc	75 hp
Inline 3 cylinder	1526 cc	90 hp
Inline 3 cylinder	1526 cc	115 hp
Inline 3 cylinder	1526 cc	125 hp
V6	2507 cc	135 hp
V6	2507 cc	150 hp
V6	3032 cc	200 hp
V6	3032 cc	225 hp
V6	3032 cc	250 hp
V6	3160 cc	300 hp & XS (a racing model)
