= Aprilia SR GT =

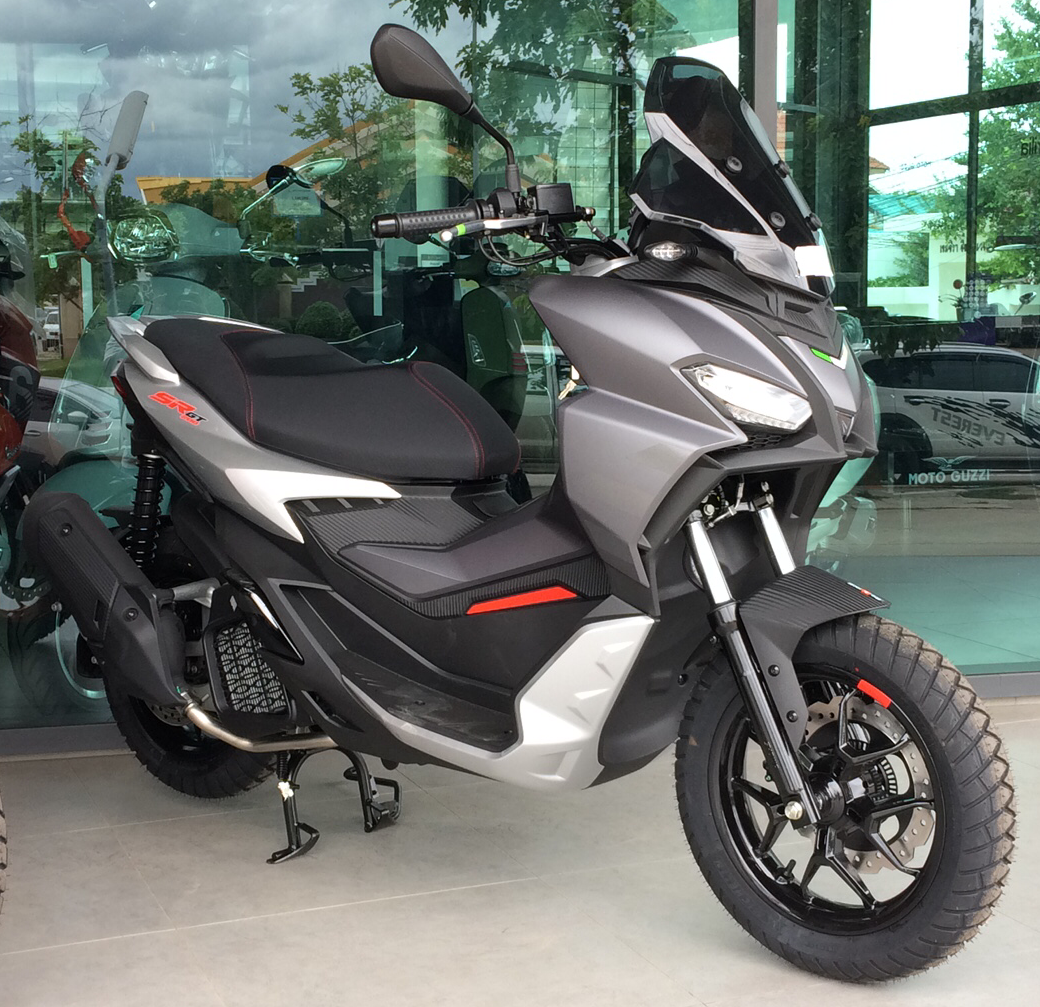
- Aprilia SR GT 200 Standard
- Manufacturer: Aprilia
- Parent company: Piaggio
- Production: 2022–present
- Assembly: Hanoi, Vietnam
- Class: Scooter
- Engine: 125 cc (7.6 cu in) Piaggio i-get 174 cc (10.6 cu in) Piaggio i-get
- Top speed: 99 km/h (125); 114 km/h (200)
- Ignition type: Capacitor discharge electronic ignition (CDI)
- Transmission: CVT automatic; gear final drive
- Frame type: Tubular steel spine
- Suspension: Front; Hydraulic telescopic fork ø 33 mm (120 mm travel); Rear; Double hydraulic shock absorber with adjustable preload (102 mm travel)
- Brakes: Front; Ø 260 mm disc Rear; Ø 220 mm disc
- Tires: Front; 110/80 R14; Rear; 130/70 R13
- Wheelbase: 1350 mm
- Dimensions: L: 1920 mm H: 765 mm
- Seat height: 799 mm
- Related: Aprilia SR50

The Aprilia SR GT is a two-wheeled scooter from the Italian manufacturer Aprilia.

== History ==
The SR GT is an "advendure" GT scooter with semi-knobbly wheels and a height of 175 mm of minimum ground clearance. It is presented at EICMA 2021 and put on sale on the European market since the spring of 2022, while on the Asian markets it has been sold since June of the same year. Production takes place at the Piaggio plant in Vinh Phuc, Hanoi, Vietnam.

It features a sporty aesthetic with a large central tunnel and a motorcycle handlebar, black and white digital instrumentation and Full LED headlights both front and rear. The compartment under the saddle has a volume of 25 liters while the compartment in the rear shield houses the USB socket.

The specific frame is a double cradle in steel tubes with Showa suspension. The front fork has 33 mm diameter stanchions with 122 mm travel, at the rear there is a pair of shock absorbers with 102 mm travel coil spring, adjustable in preload on 5 positions. The front wheels are 14” while the rear 13” with 110/80 front and 130/70 rear tires. The length is 1920 mm, width 765 mm, the wheelbase measures 1350 mm, the saddle is 799 mm high from the ground. The engines are the single-cylinder Piaggio "i-get" four-stroke in the 125 and 200 cm^{3} displacements, both Euro 5 homologated. The 125 cm^{3} produces 11 kW (15 HP) at 8,750 rpm and 12 Nm of maximum torque at 6,500 rpm. The 200 engine, also derived from the 125 unit, has an effective volume of 174 cm^{3}, delivers 13 kW (17.7 HP) of power at 8,500 rpm and 16.5 Nm of maximum torque at 7,000 rpm. Both have the Start & Stop system as standard.

The braking system consists of a double disc with 260 mm front and 220 mm rear discs both with a daisy pattern on the 200 and 125 Sport models, while the standard 125 mounts a traditional disc at the rear. CBS combined braking is standard on the 125 while the 200 is fitted with single-channel ABS. The total mass declared is 144 kg for the 125 and 148 kg for the 200.
