= Ralph Sarich =

Australian automotive engineer, inventor and businessman

Ralph Sarich AO
- Born: Ralph Tony Sarich; 10 December 1938 (age 87); Baskerville, Western Australia, Australia
- Occupations: Automotive engineer, businessman
- Known for: Developed the orbital engine and the orbital combustion process engine
- Spouse: Patricia (m. 1962)
- Children: 2
- Awards: The Churchill Medal (BSE, 1987)

Ralph Tony Sarich AO (born 10 December 1938) is an Australian automotive engineer, inventor, and businessman who developed the orbital engine and the orbital combustion process engine. Sarich founded the Orbital Engine Company, which developed the orbital combustion process (OCP) engine, based on the two-stroke concept.

== Early life ==
Sarich was born on 10 December 1938 in Baskerville, Western Australia, to an Austrian and Croat family. His parents arrived in Australia before the Great Depression of the 1930s. Sarich began an apprenticeship as a fitter and turner, studying high school years 11 and 12 subjects part-time at Midland Technical School. He qualified with top achievement at the completion of his apprenticeship, during and after which he did engineering units one day per week, night classes, and by correspondence.

== Career ==
His working career encompassed being a fitter and turner and trainee engineer with the Western Australian Government Railways between 1954 and 1963. He was a plant engineer with Thiess Brothers between 1963 and 1965, in charge of the standard gauge project before running his own business, an engineering and service station operator. Sarich was a sales engineer as well as an investor in the area of earth moving and industrial machinery before being regional general manager and an investor. As he developed the orbital engine, he became managing director of Orbital Engine Company, and chief executive officer and chairman of Orbital Engine Corporation. Following his retirement from Orbital, he became Executive Chairman of Cape Bouvard Investments, a private family investment company.

=== Orbital engine ===
Sarich concentrated on research and development of new technologies, in particular the orbital engine. The engine was first fired in 1972, and Sarich appeared on the ABC TV program The Inventors in 1972, claiming that the engine's compact design promised more power, fewer emissions and significant fuel economy. The technology was endorsed by the Royal Automobile Club of Western Australia in 1974:

"We believe this exciting and unique engine has the potential to revolutionize transport and allied technologies including automotive, aeronautical, marine and all forms of industrial and agricultural applications. "The revolution could not possibly occur in the short term, as a great deal of research and development must yet be undertaken, (but) ultimate development should see the first lightweight, reliable diesel engine and a near pollution* free petrol (gasoline) version suitable for a wide range of applications and contributing significantly to atmospheric control standards."

— Ian Miller of the Royal Automobile Club of Western Australia, 1974

The "staged combustion" process was later named the orbital combustion process (OCP). There were two distinct orbital concepts: the OCP technology and the orbital engine hardware that converted the resultant combustion energy to mechanical output to drive vehicles. Under simulated urban and highway driving cycles, it produced fuel and emission results superior to the best selected engines of the era. This was due to the OCP, often wrongly referred to as the fuel injection system because of its vital role in this technology. As the OCP technology was used on conventional engines to improve their performance this then led to inaccurate reporting claiming that the Orbital Engine Technology had failed. However, this combination was deemed to be the most cost-effective direction because it eliminated production re-tooling costs, which were inhibiting factors for mass production using orbital engine hardware.

Despite being offered A$12 million in 1973 for his stake in Orbital, Sarich refused to sell. BHP was an early investor in Sarich's Orbital Engine Company, taking a stake in the early 1970s that by 1989 represented 35% of the total company equity.

The OCP component of the engine was described in the 1980s by the Jet Propulsion Laboratories (JPL) for NASA, as the "cutting edge of world engine technology". International emission testing laboratories confirmed the Australian results. Fuel economy advantages of 50% were demonstrated against the best outboard marine engines and 20–25% under typical automobile operating conditions. Additional savings of 5–10% were considered readily achievable with further development. The savings were accompanied by a massive reduction in the "direct engine out" of several key emissions gases.

The OCP technology was sold as intellectual property (IP) to automobile, marine and motorcycle manufacturers and was incorporated in production engines to varying degrees; namely from complete systems to the improvement of their own technology, via knowledge gained from their IP purchases. All licensing payments were conditional upon the delivery of engines meeting numerous high emissions standards, fuel economies and other technical criteria. All deliveries met these criteria prior to Sarich's retirement in 1992, resulting in no dependent monetary penalties ever being incurred to that point in time.

However, key components of Sarich's engine could not be cooled and others could not be readily lubricated. The engine was susceptible to overheating, and the invention was eventually deemed too impractical.

==== In the United States ====
Sarich sought A$100 million in investment from the Australian Government in order to commence manufacture of the engine in Australia. In 1989, the government offered an industry support package of A$15–16.5 million, which Sarich declined, and he proceeded to make arrangements to establish operations in the United States. He floated Orbital Engine Corporation in the US via an initial public offering that raised A$113.8 million in 1992 and the company began trading on the New York Stock Exchange. In 1998, Sarich reported that Orbital Engine Corporation had entered into a non–exclusive licensing agreement with Ford to develop and test a pilot for the manufacture of the orbital engine. In January 1992, General Motors displayed its newest concept car called the "Ultralite", incorporating OCP technology, as its centrepiece at the Detroit International Auto Show. In April 1992, another of the world's largest automotive manufacturers signed an agreement to take a licence for OCP technology.

==== In other countries ====
In 1991, it was reported that Orbital Engine Corporation entered into a licensing agreement with Fiat, an Italian car manufacturer. Despite initial interest, Czechoslovak manufacturer, Škoda, withdrew from licensing negotiations in 1989, citing poor economic conditions in the country. Volkswagen terminated its agreement with Orbital in 1993, citing a softer European sales market.

=== Other inventions ===
In addition to the orbital engine, Sarich is credited with the following additional inventions:

- Earth moving scraper/scoop
- Initial Australian Water Watcher
- Special orchard cultivator
- Non-geared transmission for cars
- High pressure orchard spray pump
- Security Cable Gate – sold Australia wide
- Linear Wind Generator
- World's first two-speed reel for Marlin fishing

=== Value and retirement ===
As Orbital Engine Corporation sold its IP to manufacturers and the company did not manufacture engines, the success of Orbital was doubted. However, the company's financial success is reflected in the fiscal years 1989, 1990 (A$23.5m), 1991 and 1992 (A$22.75m).

Orbital's capitalised value upon Sarich's retirement as CEO in 1992 was in excess of A$1 billion. Over A$200 million at the time in cash, receivables, and research value convertible to cash, were scheduled for commercial investment as insurance against excessive dependence on the auto industry. Sarich converted a component of the risk element into relatively secure investments in synergetic corporations as patents expired and related IP income ceased. Since his retirement, Orbital's new management has invested retained earnings in further research. Sarich sold his equity for a reputed A$100 million.

Following his retirement from Orbital, Cape Bouvard Investments (CBI) became the main focus for Sarich in his capacity as Executive Chairman of the private family investment company; while his son Peter is responsible for operations. CBI invests in numerous fields such as property investment, property development, technology and equities.

== Personal life ==
Sarich met Patricia in 1957, and they married in September 1962. Her parents also migrated to Australia as little children from Britain after World War I. Patricia was born in Kellerberrin, Western Australia. They have two children, Peter and Jennifer (deceased).

Sarich donated a considerable amount of the profits from the Orbital Corporation into the community, including commitments of approximately A$65 million to various charitable organisations, including an A$20 million gift in 2008 towards neuroscience medical research facilities in Perth.

=== Net worth ===
In 2015, the Business Review Weekly (BRW) Rich List assessed Sarich's net worth to be A$1.05 billion, and on the Forbes list of Australia's 50 Richest people, Sarich's net worth was estimated at US$0.66 billion. As of May 2025, the Financial Review Rich List, which replaced the BRW, assessed Sarich's net worth at A$1.72 billion.

Year	Financial Review Rich List		Forbes Australia's 50 Richest	
Year	Rank	Net worth (A$)	Rank	Net worth (US$)
2015	46	$1.05 billion	44	$0.66 billion ▲
2016			40 ▲	$0.66 billion
2017		$1.12 billion ▲		
2018	63 ▲	$1.23 billion ▲		
2019	76 ▼	$1.20 billion ▼	46 ▼	$0.81 billion ▲
2020	94 ▼	$1.08 billion ▼		
2022	80 ▲	$1.60 billion ▲		
2023	86 ▼	$1.57 billion ▼		
2024		$1.60 billion ▲		
2025	99	$1.72 billion ▲		

Legend
Icon	Description
Steady	Has not changed from the previous year
▲	Has increased from the previous year
▼	Has decreased from the previous year

=== Awards ===
Sarich has been the recipient of many prestigious engineering, commercial and civil awards including:

- 1972 Australian Broadcasting Commission Inventor of the Year
- 1972 Citizen of the Year
- 1972 Sir Lawrence Hartnett Inventors Award – Science
- 1972 West Australian Citizen of the Year
- 1973 Jaycees Outstanding Young Australian
- 1986 Hartnett Medal of the Royal Society of Arts for contribution to manufacture and commerce
- 1987 Doctor of Science from Murdoch University
- 1988 Officer of the Order of Australia (AO) for service to engineering
- 1987 The Churchill Medal awarded by the Society of Engineers, and the first Australian to be awarded the Medal
- 1988 Honorary Fellow of the Society of Engineers
- 1991 Clunies Ross Award for automotive engineering by the National Academy of Science & Technology

== Philanthropy ==
In July 2008, Sarich pledged A$20 million toward a new neuroscience research facility at the Queen Elizabeth II Medical Centre in Perth, reported as one of Western Australia’s largest personal philanthropic gifts at the time. The resulting Ralph & Patricia Sarich Neuroscience Research Institute (SNRI) opened in April 2017 and houses multiple Western Australian research organisations, including the Perron Institute, the Ear Science Institute Australia, the Australian Alzheimer’s Research Foundation, and Curtin University’s Neuroscience Research Laboratory. The facility was officially opened by the Governor of Western Australia, Kerry Sanderson.

== Published work ==
- Sarich, Ralph; Patent, Trade Marks and Designs Office (1970). Improved rotary engines. Patent Office, Australia.
