= Aprilia SR50 =

Aprilia SR
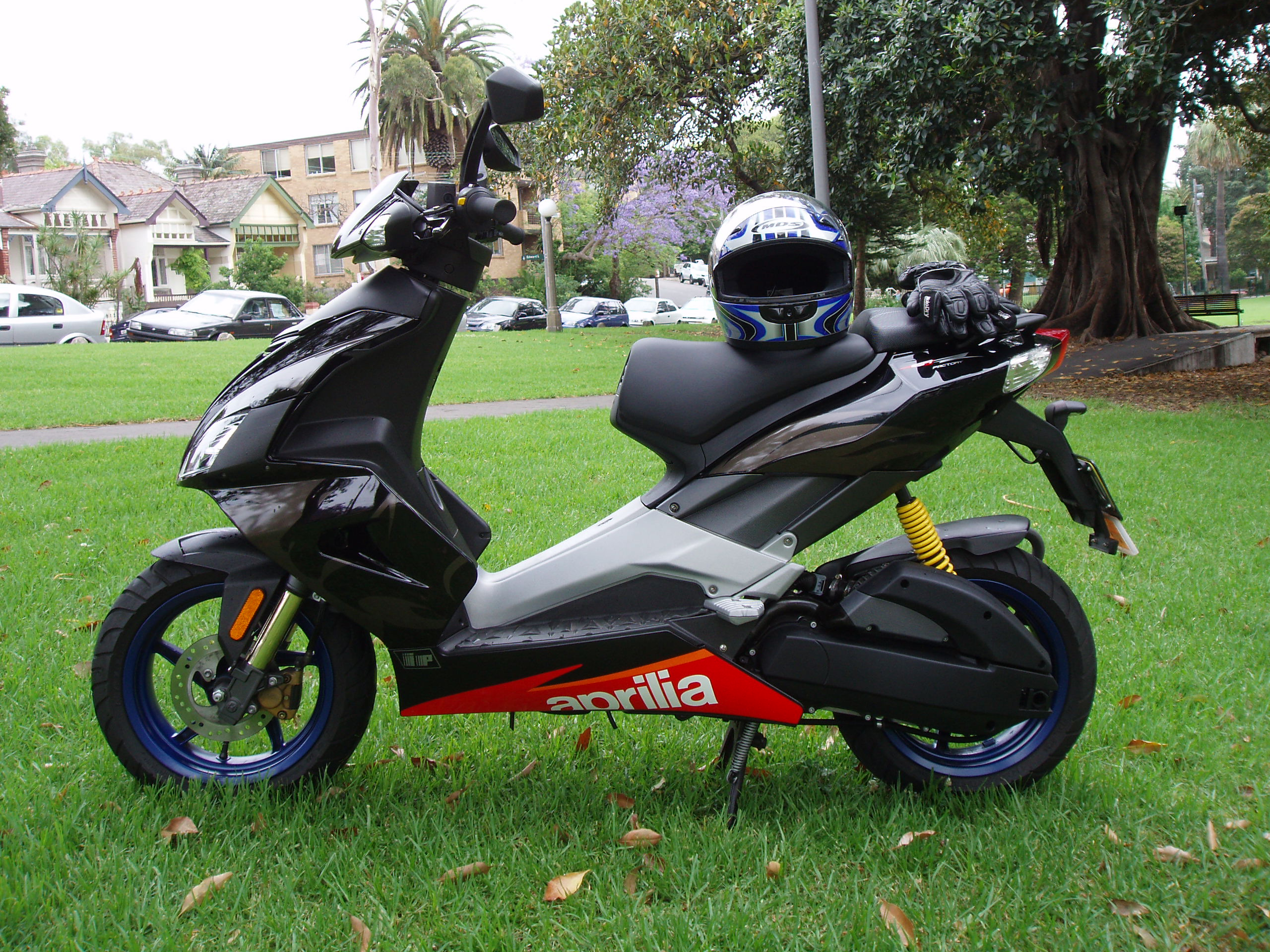
- Manufacturer: Aprilia
- Parent company: Piaggio
- Production: 1992 - January 2021
- Class: Scooter
- Engine: 49.38 cc (several different engines used)
- Top speed: 45-50 km/h restricted, up to 85-90 km/h derestricted. Optional gear up kits available, they can lift the maximum speed up to 130 km/h.
- Transmission: CVT
- Suspension: Front telescopic fork, rear hydraulic monoshock
- Brakes: 190mm disks front and rear
- Tires: 13" wheels 130/60 tyres
- Wheelbase: 1290 mm
- Dimensions: L: 1860 mm W: 705 mm
- Seat height: 765 mm
- Weight: 108 kg (wet)
- Fuel capacity: 7.45 L
- Oil capacity: 1.2 L
- Fuel consumption: 110- 145mpg
- Related: Aprilia SR GT

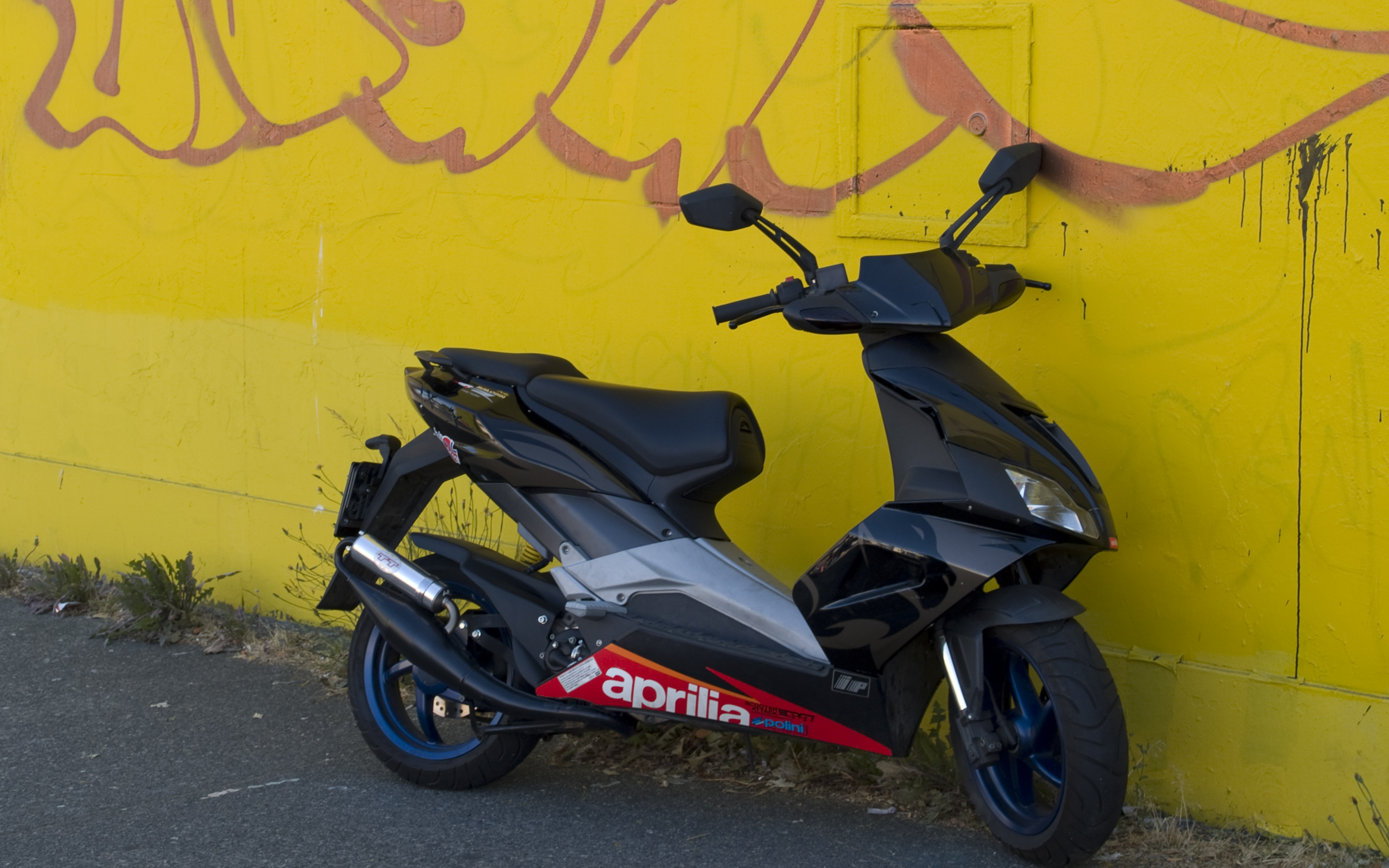
Aprilia SR50 R Factory, the latest model

The Aprilia SR50 is a scooter built by Aprilia.

== History ==
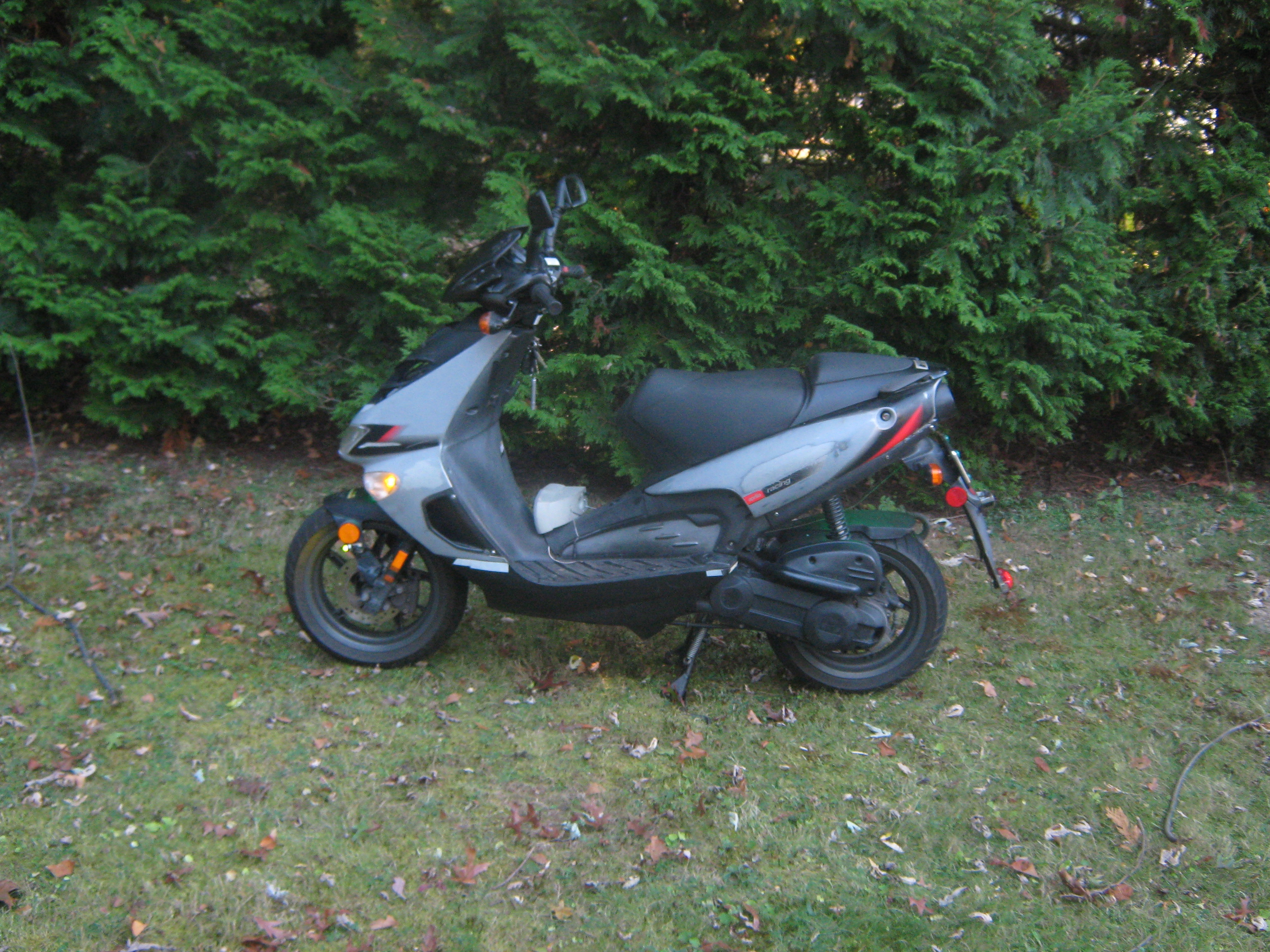
2003 Aprilia SR50

Introduced in 1992, more than 800,000 units have been sold, bucking the trend for less use of two-stroke engines. Aprilia claims several firsts for the SR50 in the scooter market, including 13 inch wheels, liquid cooling, double disc braking, and a direct injection engine.

The performance-oriented suspension, tires, and engine are consistent with its styling. Colours and graphics vary by country. The digital instrument panel gives readings for speed, clock, odometer, trip counter, fuel level, coolant temperature and battery voltage.

The SR50 has used a variety of engines, sourced from Morini, Piaggio and Minarelli. It conforms to EURO 3 emission standards. The DiTech model used an injection engine, with technology from Orbital. The current model uses a Dell'Orto carburetor. The powerful engines allow reaching very high speeds for a scooter, the SR50 can reach 90 km/h in its standard configuration after being derestricted.

== DITECH two-stroke engine ==
The SR50 DITECH uses the Synerject gasoline direct injection (GDI) system developed jointly by the Orbital Corporation and Siemens AG. The system uses a crank-driven air compressor to deliver air to the cylinder head at a pressure of 5 bars (500 kPa; 73 psi), thereby avoiding the use of carburation; the cylinder walls are not wet with gasoline, only with lubricating oil. After the port is closed and the air is compressed by the piston, gasoline is injected by an atomizer like a spray nozzle mixed with and propelled by the highly compressed air, into the main combustion chamber where, after the injection port closes, and the piston is still rising, it is ignited in the compressed main charge of air. The use of direct injection and stratified charge allows the DITECH engine to meet Euro 2 standards.

A small amount of crankcase oil is present in the compressed air used to atomize the fuel, but that was found to present no problems in the production of large numbers of the scooter. A problem was found with varying input humidity producing varying condensation water in the compressor system, and Aprilia deployed an oem retrofit solenoid valve to be installed near the injector which would drain the system of accumulated water each time the engine was switched off. Users complained that without this retrofit, the spark plug would accumulate carbon, and commented that with the retrofit, operation was trouble free.

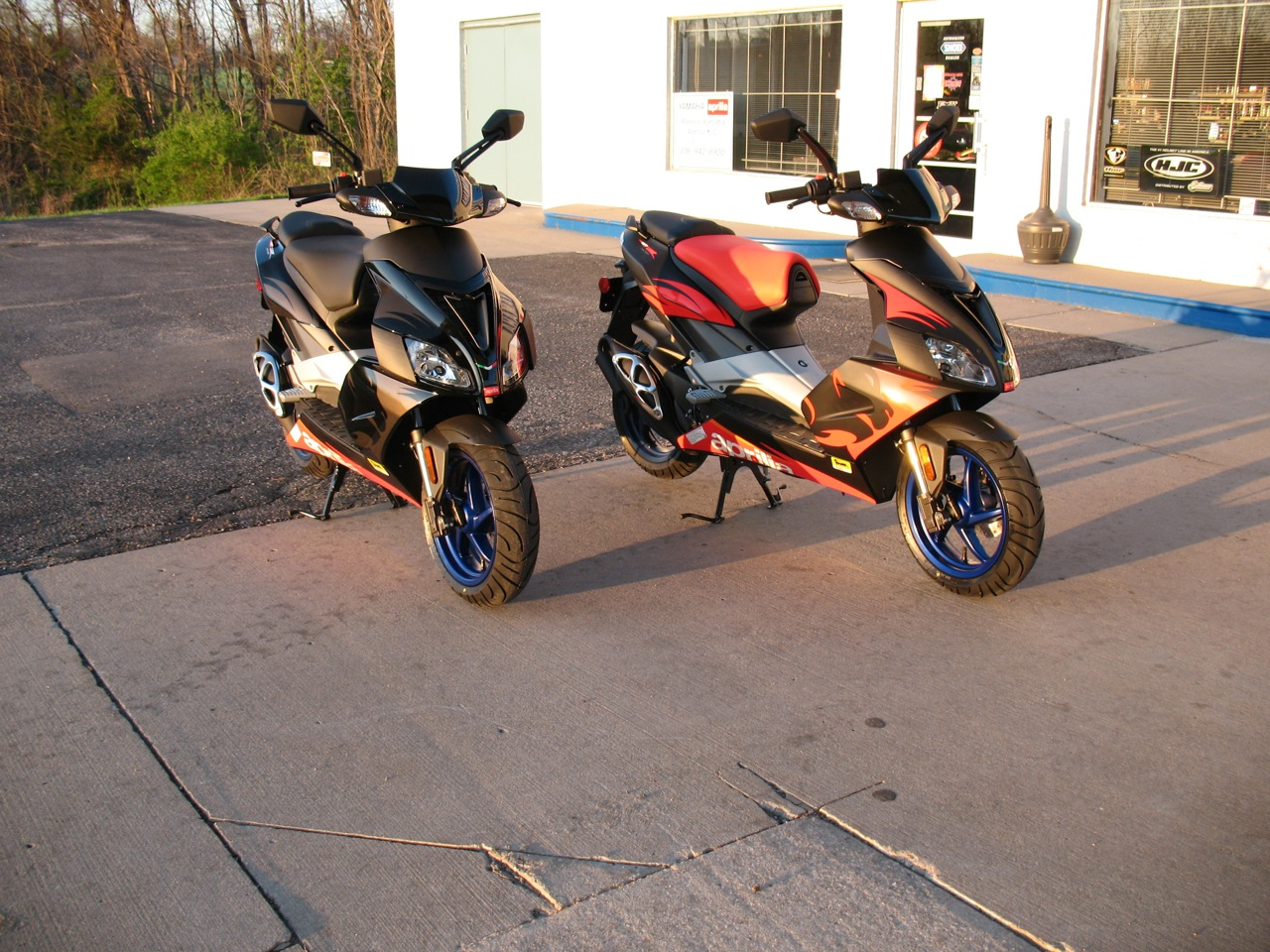
Aprilia SR50R

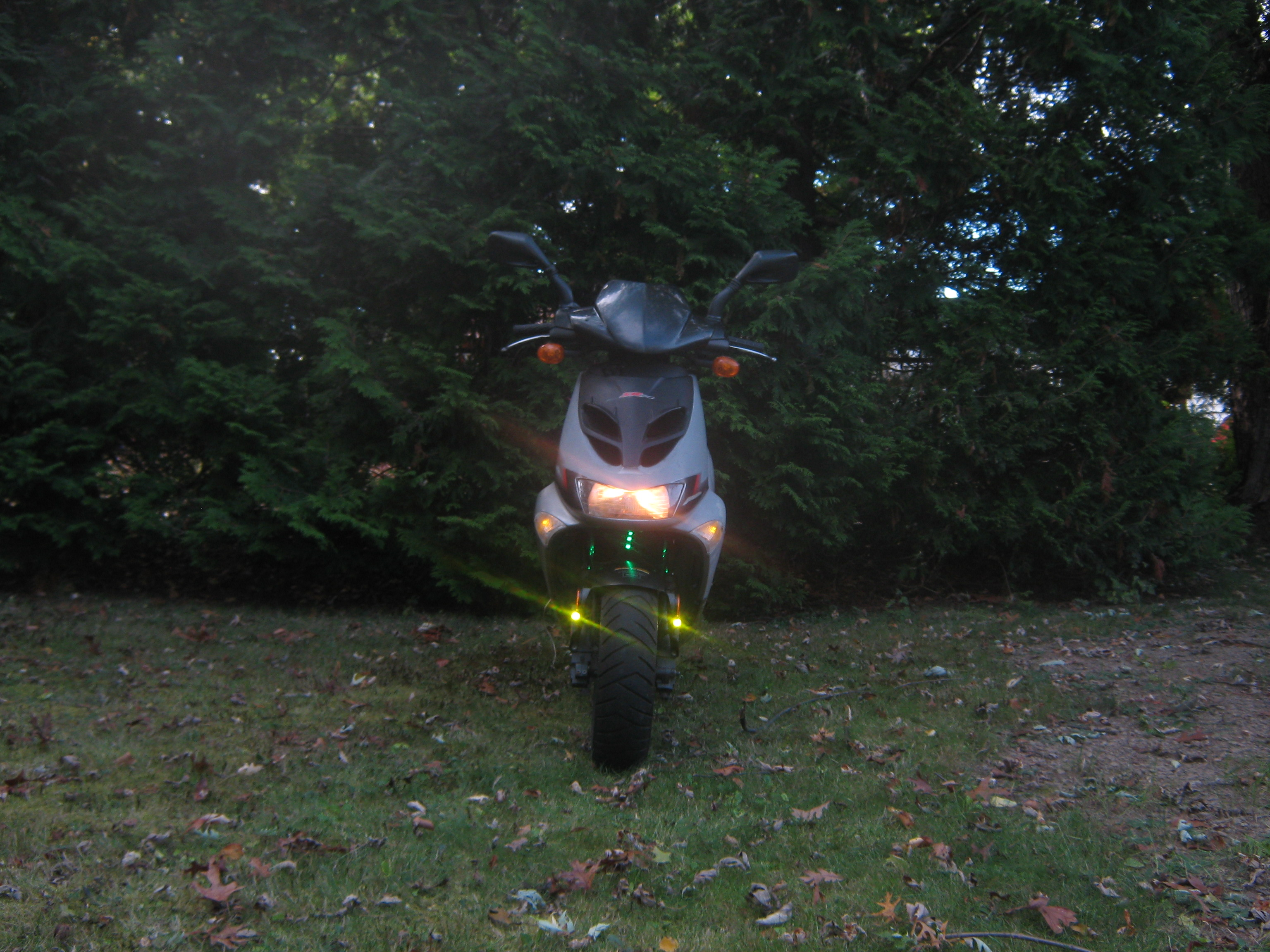
2003 Aprilia SR50 Ditech with customized lighting
