= Sarich orbital engine =

Type of internal combustion engine

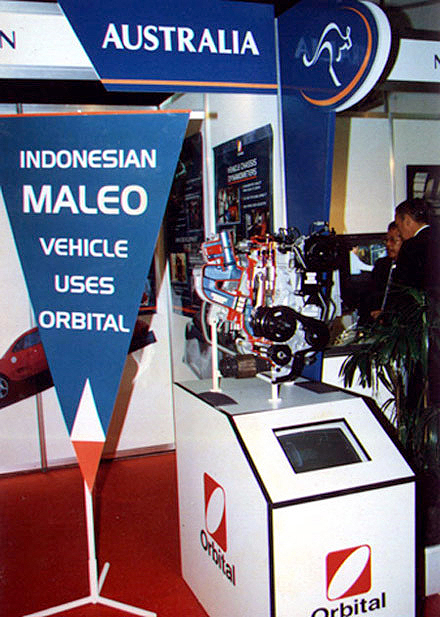
Engine incorporating OCP (Orbital Combustion Process), on display in Jakarta

The Sarich orbital engine is a type of internal combustion engine, invented in 1972 by Ralph Sarich, an engineer from Perth, Australia, which features orbital rather than reciprocating motion of its central piston. It differs from the conceptually similar Wankel engine by using a generally prismatic shaped piston that orbits the axis of the engine, without rotation, rather than the rotating trilobular rotor of the Wankel.

== Overview ==
The engine promised to be about one third the size and weight of conventional piston engines due to the compact arrangement of the combustion chambers. Another advantage is that there is no high-speed contact area with the engine walls, unlike in the Wankel engine in which edge wear is a problem. However, the combustion chambers are divided by vanes which do have contact with both the walls and the orbiting piston and are more difficult to seal due to the eight corners of the combustion chamber.

In the patent, the engine is described as two stroke internal combustion engine, but the patent claims that with a different valve mechanism it could be used as a four stroke engine. However most of the development work was done on four stroke versions with both poppet and disk valve arrangements. A supercharger is required if operated in two stroke mode since crankcase pumping can't be used to charge the combustion chamber.

Interestingly, in his seminal book researching and documenting all the possible ways to create a rotary piston displacer, Felix Wankel shows the orbiting piston and reciprocating vane mechanism used in the orbital engine.

== Research and development ==
The Orbital Engine Company, with funding from partner BHP and Federal Government R&D grants, worked on the concept from 1972 until 1983 and had a 3.5L four stroke engine performing as well as the similar petrol car engines of the day at typical road load conditions. A technical paper was presented to the Society of Automotive Engineers in 1982, and is now part of their historic transaction collection.

A major reason for the good performance of this engine was the development of a unique and patented injection system directed into the combustion chamber which created a stratified charge combustion process.

Several auto makers from around the world showed great interest in the engine, however it was realised that there was still at least $100 million of development work required to commercialise the engine and the funding sources decided this was not a sound investment. Instead it was realised the same injection and combustion system could be adapted onto existing two and four stroke petrol engines and this work became the future of the company, being called the Orbital Combustion Process.

During the prototyping process, the engine has been installed in 3 vehicles: Toyota Kijang (3 cylinder unit), and Suzuki Karimun. (2 cylinder unit), installed by Sangeet Hari Kapoor when he was working in PT Wahana Perkasa Auto Jaya, which is a company under the Texmaco group. The 3 cylinder unit is also installed in 100 units of Ford Festivas in Australia, dubbed Festiva EcoSport, and the verdict is that while the car is somewhat more powerful than the Ford Festiva 1.3, it failed to deliver emission compliance, efficiency, and NVH (noise, vibration, harshness) reduction at the same time.

== Technical problems ==
The orbital engine has two of fundamental design issues, which also plague the Wankel engine:

1. Large surface to volume ratio combustion chamber which leads to larger combustion chamber heat losses and so loss of power, which can be greatly reduced using stratified combustion;
2. Long sealing paths and multiple corner seals which mean it is harder to contain the chamber gases and so there is some loss of pressure and thus power.

== Drawings ==
Some conceptual sketches from the engine's patent:

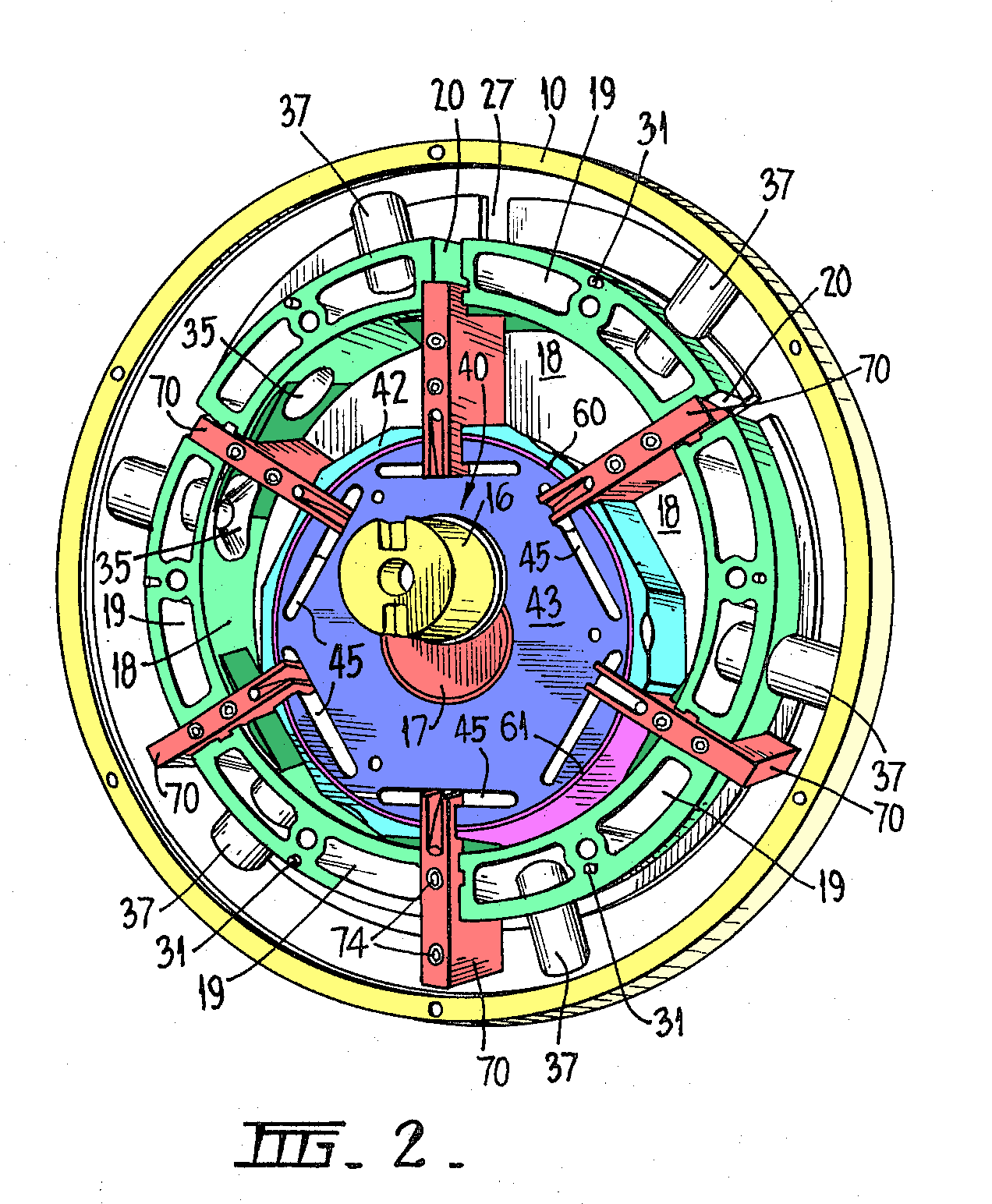
perspective view with the exhaust end cover and chamber end plates removed

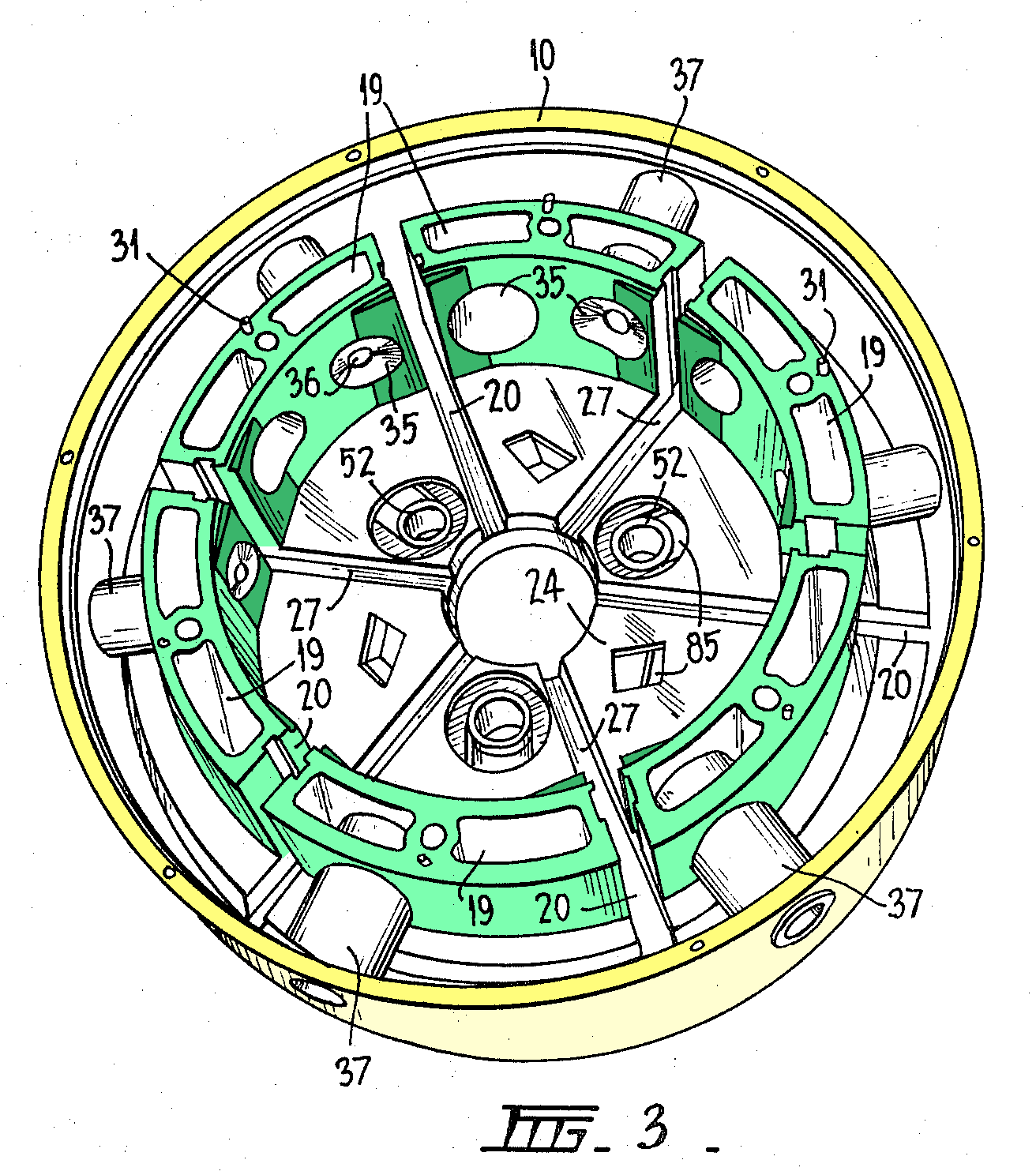
as before but with the vane and cam member also removed

== See also ==
- Orbital Corporation
- Powerplus supercharger
