= Orbital Corporation =

Australian clean-engine and alternative-fuel company

Orbital Corporation Limited
- Traded as: ASX: OEC
- Industry: orbital engine, technology licensing, propulsion systems.
- Founded: Listing 1989
- Founder: Ralph Sarich
- Headquarters: Balcatta, Western Australia
- Area served: Worldwide
- Key people: MD and CEO – Todd Alder; Chair – John Welborn
- Products: Orbital engine technology, propulsion systems for unmanned aerial vehicles
- Website: orbitaluav.com

Orbital Corporation Limited (ASX: OEC), formerly Orbital Engine Corporation Limited pioneered by Ralph Sarich, is an Australian company based in Balcatta, Western Australia, that aims to provide clean engine technologies and alternative fuel systems with reduced environmental impact from gas emissions and improved fuel economy.

== Consulting services ==
Design, manufacturing, development and testing facilities have been established at the Balcatta facility. Orbital has developed infrastructure in engine design and modelling, numerical analysis, computational fluid dynamics, combustion and fuel system development, rapid-turn-around prototyping, and engine-management system software and hardware design.

== Autogas systems ==
Orbital Autogas Systems, a former subsidiary of Orbital Corporation, used to produce a retrofit LPG system applicable to a range of vehicles. Orbital Liquid LPG injection (LLi) is claimed to be the latest generation in automotive LPG fuel systems, promising substantial fuel savings, improved fuel consumption and reduced pollution. Injection of LPG into the engine as a liquid rather than a vapour is claimed to improve engine volumetric efficiency, producing more power from less fuel. Due to falling demand for automotive LPG conversions, and the resulting decline in profitability, the business was closed in December 2015. The assets and ongoing customer and supplier contracts were sold to Sprint Gas (Aust) Pty. Ltd. for approximately A$500,000

== Variable-fuel engine ==
A technology named FlexDI purports to improve emissions and fuel consumption in internal combustion engines designed to accept any common fuel type. The invention is being promoted to marine, recreational and light commercial vehicle markets including autorickshaws.

In 2003, the company was awarded a Banksia Award for its innovative combustion technology—winning in the category 'Leadership in Sustainable Product Design'.

The Orbital Redback heavy fuel engine using FlexDI was chosen in 2012 to power an unmanned aerial vehicle (UAV) manufactured by AAIs Australian division Aerosonde.

== See also ==
- Orbital engine
