= Evinrude =

Evinrude may refer to:

- Evinrude Outboard Motors, a company that builds outboard motors for boats
- The dragonfly in the 1977 Disney animated film The Rescuers
- Ole Evinrude (1877–1934), Norwegian-American inventor, founder of Evinrude Outboard Motors
- Ralph Evinrude (1907–1986), American businessman
