= Rapiscan Systems =

Manufacturer of metal detectors and X-ray machines

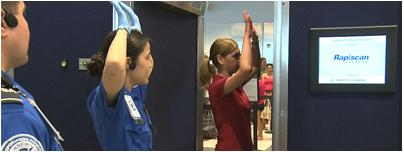
Rapiscan X-ray backscatter scanner

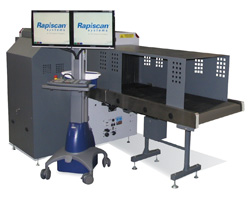
Advanced Technology (AT) X-ray systems for baggage scanning

Rapiscan Systems is an American privately held company that specialises in walk-through metal detectors and X-ray machines for screening airport luggage and cargo. The company is owned by OSI Systems.

The company headquarters, in Torrance, California, USA, is the primary location for research and development, engineering, manufacturing, sales and marketing, and customer service support. Their European headquarters, and home to Rapiscan Systems Limited, is in Salfords in Surrey, England, near Gatwick Airport. The primary centre for development and distribution of X-ray systems for hold-baggage screening is also at Salfords. In Espoo, Finland, Rapiscan Systems designed and manufactured its Metor Metal Detectors, used in people-screening applications.

Rapiscan also has significant research and development, distribution, support, and manufacturing facilities in Melbourne, Australia; Singapore; Sunnyvale, California in the USA; Johor Bahru in Malaysia; Ocean Springs, Mississippi in the USA; and Hyderabad in India.

The company is certified to the ISO 9001:2008 Quality Standard.

== History ==
Rapiscan was formed in the United Kingdom in 1972 as the Security Products Division of International Aeradio Limited (IAL). This company then acquired metal detector manufacturer Adams Electronics in 1984. Two years later Rapiscan's X-Ray Division and Adams Electronics were combined as IAL Security Products, located in Crawley, West Sussex. In 1993 Opto Sensors, Inc. in the United States formed Rapiscan Security Products, Inc., which then acquired Rapiscan in the UK. Opto Sensors, Inc. became OSI Systems.

Rapiscan Metor walk-through metal detectors stem originally from Outokumpu, which was one of the first companies to develop walk-through metal detectors for security screening. The systems were originally adapted from metal detectors used in the mining industry to locate parts of broken drill bits in minerals on a conveyor belt. The Metor company was spun off from Outokumpu and later acquired by Rapiscan.

As of 2008, the company had installed more than 50,000 security and inspection systems globally, and in April 2008, Rapiscan Systems UK won the Queen's Award for International Trade in recognition of its growth over the previous three years, tripling its revenue during 2005–2007.

Rapiscan manufactures a controversial backscatter X-ray system for screening airport passengers, the Rapiscan Secure 1000. On 23 September 1998 the device's inventor, Steven Smith, assuaged the concerns of radiation security experts about the possible risk posed to people by the device, saying "The places I think you are not going to see these in the next five years is lower-security facilities, particularly power plants, embassies, courthouses, airports, and governments...I would be extremely surprised in the next five to 10 years if the Secure 1000 is sold to any of these."

The company has developed a fast 3D X-ray CT scanner for hold-luggage, the RTT80. They announced in 2008 that this scanner would undergo tests in Manchester Airport and that it would shortly undergo testing by the TSA. The system was originally developed by CXR Ltd in Surrey, and the Engineering and Physical Sciences Research Council (EPSRC) funded a grant for the School of Mathematics, University of Manchester to work on the reconstruction problem for Rapiscan. The RTT80 has an 80 cm diameter opening, and the RTT110, a 1.02m aperture.

Teaming with the University of Manchester and Manchester Airport, they started a research project, EMBody, to develop the "next generation walk-by metal detector". Rapiscan, the University of Manchester, and the Mines Advisory Group have a project initiated by Bobby Charlton on civilian land mine clearance.

== See also ==
- Backscatter X-ray
- Full body scanner
