= Millimeter wave scanner =

Body screening device

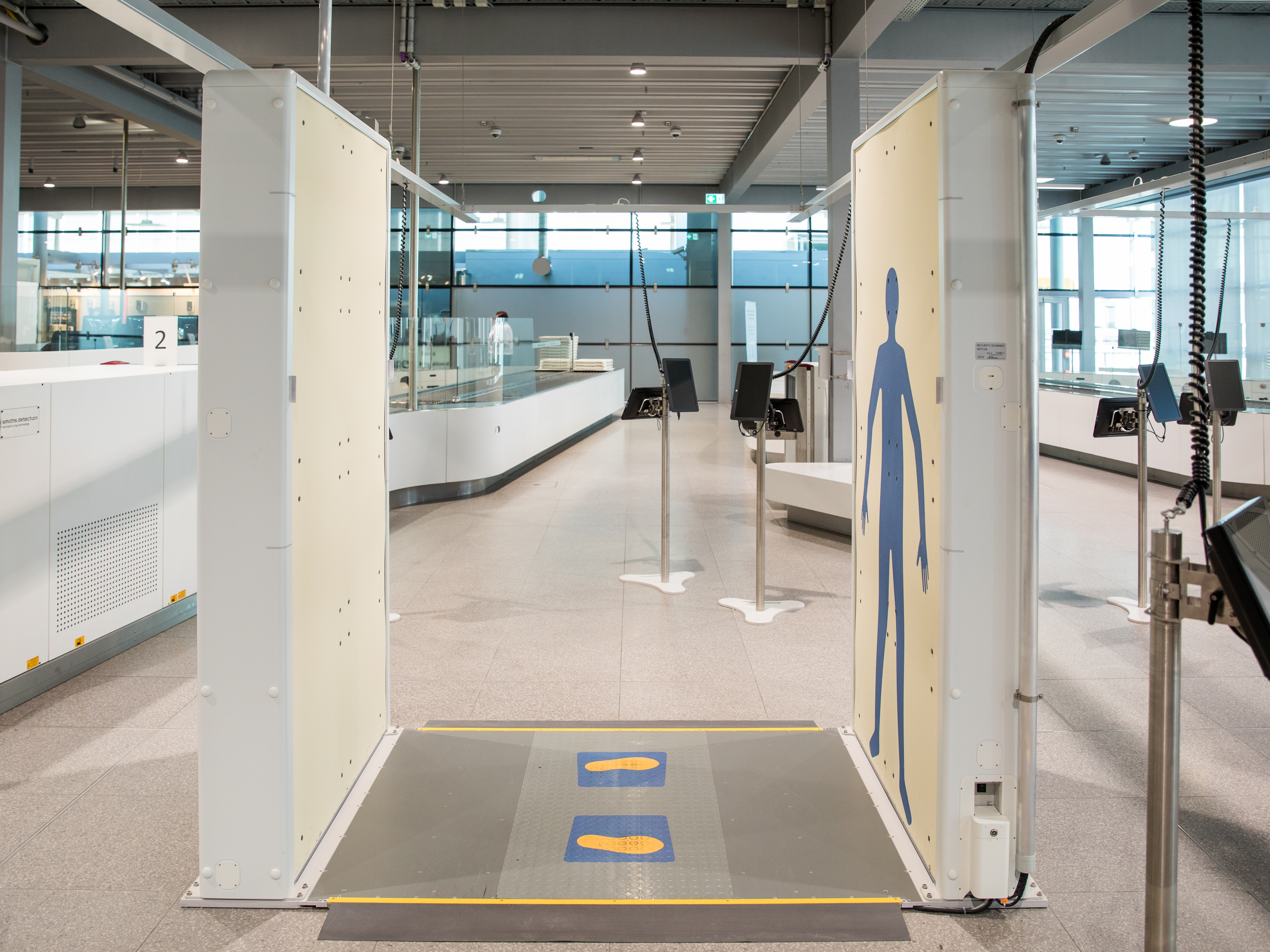
A millimeter wave scanner at Cologne Bonn Airport, Germany, Europe

A millimeter wave scanner is a whole-body imaging device used for detecting objects concealed underneath a person’s clothing using a form of electromagnetic radiation. Typical uses for this technology include detection of items for commercial loss prevention, smuggling, and screening for weapons at government buildings and airport security checkpoints.

It is one of the common technologies of full body scanner used for body imaging; a competing technology is backscatter X-ray. Millimeter wave scanners come in two varieties: active and passive. Active scanners direct millimeter wave energy at the subject and then interpret the reflected energy. Passive systems create images using only ambient radiation and radiation emitted from the human body or objects.

== Technical details ==
In active scanners, the millimeter wave (a type of microwave) is transmitted from two antennas simultaneously as they rotate around the body. The wave energy reflected back from the body or other objects on the body is used to construct a three-dimensional image, which is displayed on a remote monitor for analysis.

== History ==
The first millimeter-wave full body scanner was developed at the Pacific Northwest National Laboratory (PNNL) in Richland, Washington. The operation is one of the eight national laboratories Battelle manages for the U.S. Department of Energy. In the 1990s, they patented their 3-D holographic-imagery technology, with research and development support provided by the TSA and the Federal Aviation Administration (FAA). In 2002, Silicon Valley startup SafeView, Inc. obtained an exclusive license to PNNL's (background) intellectual property, to commercialize their technology. From 2002 to 2006, SafeView developed a production-ready millimeter body scanner system, and software which included scanner control, algorithms for threat detection and object recognition, as well as techniques to conceal raw images in order to resolve privacy concerns. During this time, SafeView developed foreground IP through several patent applications. By 2006, SafeView's body scanning portals had been installed and trialed at various locations around the globe. They were installed at border crossings in Israel, international airports such as Mexico City and Amsterdam's Schiphol, ferry landings in Singapore, railway stations in the UK, government buildings like The Hague, and commercial buildings in Tokyo. They were also employed to secure soldiers and workers in Iraq's Green Zone. In 2006, SafeView was acquired by L-3 Communications. From 2006 and 2020, L-3 Communications (later L3Harris) continued to make incremental enhancements to their scanner systems, while deploying thousands of units world wide. In 2020, Leidos acquired L3Harris Security Detection and Automation businesses, which included their body scanner business unit.

== Privacy concerns ==
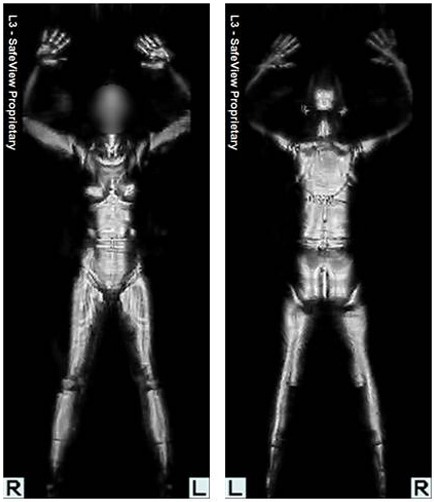
Millimeter-wave image of a person with their face blurred

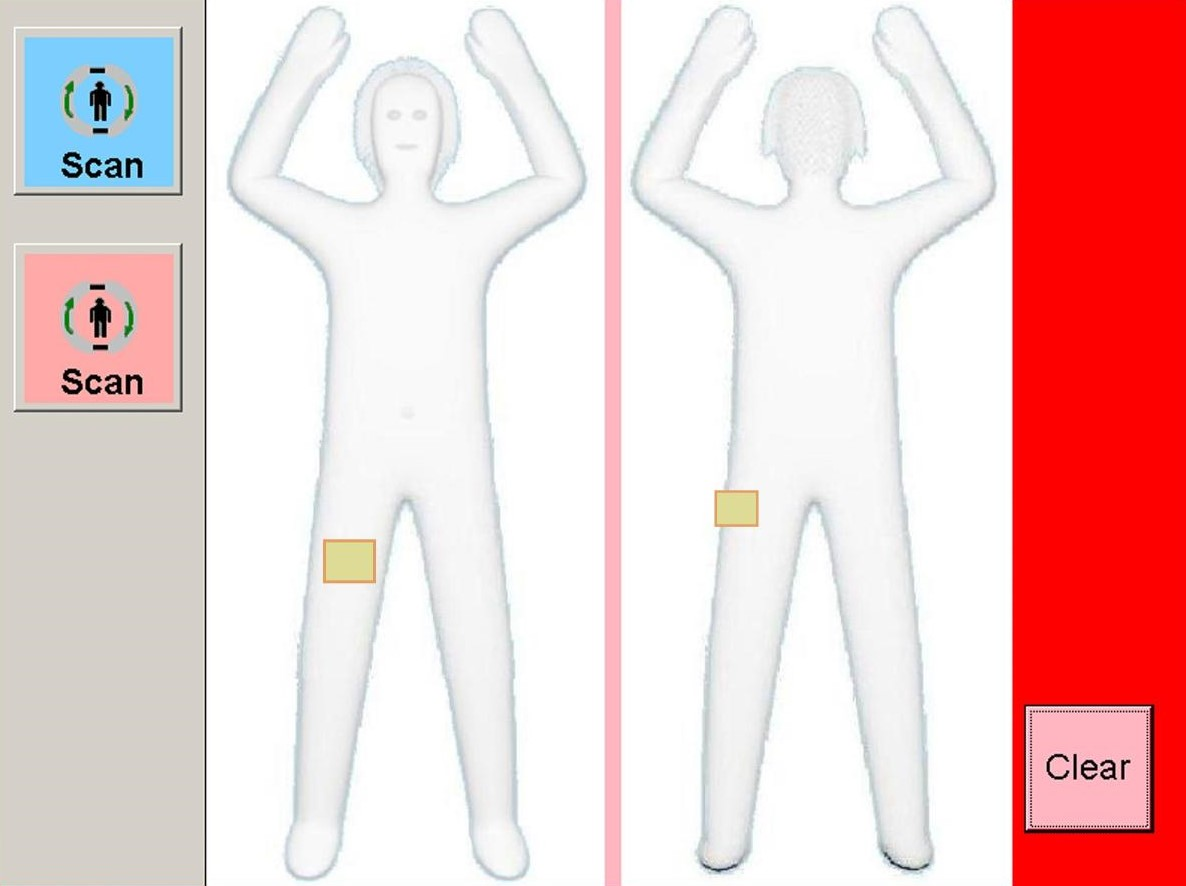
Generic body outline showing the locations of objects detected by a TSA millimeter wave scanner

Historically, privacy advocates were concerned about the use of full body scanning technology because it used to display a detailed image of the surface of the skin under clothing, prosthetics including breast prostheses, and other medical equipment normally hidden, such as colostomy bags. These privacy advocates called the images "virtual strip searches". However, in 2013 the U.S. Congress prohibited the display of detailed images and required the display of metal and other objects on a generic body outline instead of the person's actual skin. Such generic body outlines can be made by Automatic Target Recognition (ATR) software. As of June 1, 2013, all back-scatter full body scanners were removed from use at U.S. airports, because they could not comply with TSA's software requirements. Millimeter-wave full body scanners utilize ATR, and are compliant with TSA software requirements.

Software imaging technology can also mask specific body parts. Proposed remedies for privacy concerns include scanning only people who are independently detected to be carrying contraband, or developing technology to mask genitals and other private parts. In some locations, travelers have the choice between the body scan or a "patdown". In Australia, the scans are mandatory; in the UK, however, passengers may opt out of being scanned. In this case, the individual must be screened by an alternative method which includes at least an enhanced hand search in private as set out on the UK government website.

In the United States, the Transportation Security Administration (TSA) claimed to have taken steps to address privacy objections. The TSA claimed that the images captured by the machines were not stored. On the other hand, the U.S. Marshals Service admitted that it had saved thousands of images captured from a Florida checkpoint. The officer sitting at the machine does not see the image; rather that screen shows only whether the viewing officer has confirmed that the passenger has cleared. Conversely, the officer who views the image does not see the person being scanned by the device. In some locations, updated software has removed the necessity of a separate officer in a remote location. These units now generate a generic image of a person, with specific areas of suspicion highlighted by boxes. If no suspicious items are detected by the machine, a green screen instead appears indicating the passenger is cleared.

Concerns remain about alternative ways to capture and disseminate the image. Additionally, the protective steps often do not entirely address the underlying privacy concerns. Subjects may object to anyone viewing them in a state of effective undress, even if it is not the agent next to the machine or the image is not retrievable.

Reports of full-body scanner images being improperly and perhaps illegally saved and disseminated have emerged.

== Possible health effects ==
Millimeter wavelength radiation is a subset of the microwave radio frequency spectrum. Even at its high-energy end, it is still more than 3 orders of magnitude lower in energy than its nearest radiotoxic neighbour (ultraviolet) in the electromagnetic spectrum. As such, millimeter wave radiation is non-ionizing and incapable of causing cancers by radiolytic DNA bond cleavage. Due to the shallow penetration depth of millimeter waves into tissue (typically less than 1 mm), acute biological effects of irradiation are localized in epidermal and dermal layers and manifest primarily as thermal effects. There is no clear evidence to date of harmful effects other than those caused by localised heating and ensuing chemical changes (expression of heat shock proteins, denaturation, proteolysis, and inflammatory response, see also mobile phone radiation and health). The energy density required to produce thermal injury in skin is much higher than that typically delivered in an active millimeter wave scanner.

The fragmented or misfolded molecules resulting from thermal injury may be delivered to neighbouring cells through diffusion and into the systemic circulation through perfusion. Increased skin permeability under irradiation exacerbates this possibility. It is therefore plausible that the molecular products of thermal injury (and their distribution to areas remote from the site of irradiation) could cause secondary injury. Note that this would be no different from the effects of a thermal injury sustained in a more conventional fashion. Due to the increasing ubiquity of millimeter wave radiation (see WiGig), research into its potential biological effects is ongoing.

Independent of thermal injury, a 2009 study funded by National Institutes of Health, conducted by U.S. Department of Energy's Los Alamos National Laboratories Theoretical Division and Center for Nonlinear Studies and Harvard University Medical School found that terahertz range radiation creates changes in DNA breathing dynamics, creating apparent interference with the naturally occurring local strand separation dynamics of double-stranded DNA and consequently, with DNA function. The same article was referenced by MIT Technology Journal article on October 30, 2009.

Millimeter wave scanners should not be confused with backscatter X-ray scanners, a completely different technology used for similar purposes at airports. X-rays are ionizing radiation, more energetic than millimeter waves by more than five orders of magnitude, and raise concerns about possible mutagenic potential.

== Effectiveness ==
The efficacy of millimeter wave scanners in detecting threatening objects has been questioned. Formal studies demonstrated the relative inability of these scanners to detect objects—dangerous or not—on the person being scanned. Additionally, some studies suggested that the cost–benefit ratios of these scanners is poor. As of January 2011, there had been no report of a terrorist capture as a result of a body scanner. In a series of repeated tests, the body scanners were not able to detect a handgun hidden in an undercover agent's undergarments, but the agents responsible for monitoring the body scanners were deemed at fault for not recognizing the concealed weapon.

Millimeter wave scanners also have problems reading through sweat, in addition to yielding false positives from buttons and folds in clothing. Some countries, such as Germany, have reported a false-positive rate of 54%.

== Deployment ==
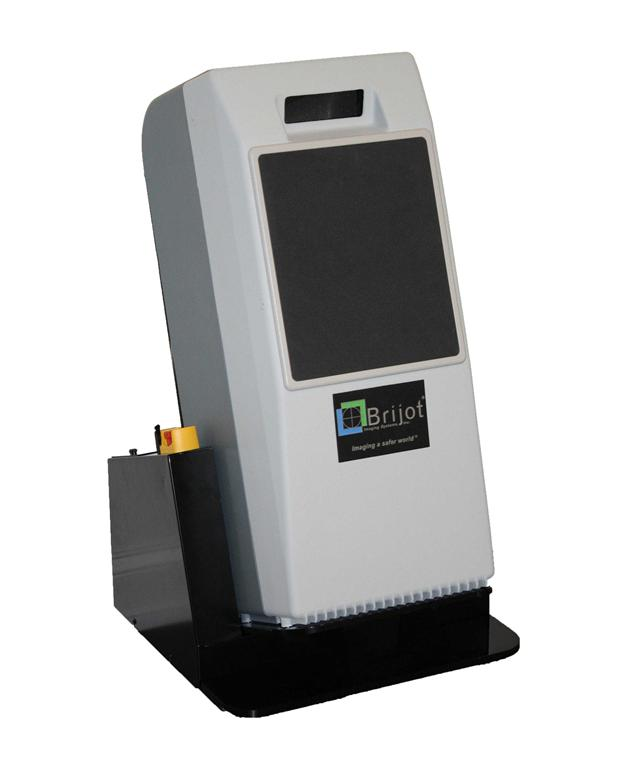
Passive millimeter wave unit

While airport security may be the most visible and public use of body scanners, companies have opted to deploy passive employee screening to help reduce inventory shrink from key distribution centers.

The UK Border Agency (the predecessor of UK Visas and Immigration) initiated use of passive screening technology to detect illicit goods.

As of April 2009, the U.S. Transportation Security Administration began deploying scanners at airports, e.g., at the Los Angeles International Airport (LAX). These machines have also been deployed in the Jersey City PATH train system. They have also been deployed at San Francisco International airport (SFO), as well as Salt Lake International Airport (SLC), Indianapolis International Airport (IND), Detroit-Wayne County Metropolitan Airport (DTW), Minneapolis-St. Paul International Airport (MSP), and Las Vegas International Airport (LAS).

Three security scanners using millimeter waves were put into use at Schiphol Airport in Amsterdam on 15 May 2007, with more expected to be installed later. The passenger's head is masked from the view of the security personnel.

Passive scanners are also currently in use at Fiumicino Airport, Italy. They will next be deployed in Malpensa Airport.

The federal courthouse in Orlando, Florida employs passive screening devices capable of recording and storing images.

=== Canada ===
In 2008, the Canadian Air Transport Security Authority held a trial of the scanners at Kelowna International Airport in Kelowna, British Columbia. Before the trial, the Office of the Privacy Commissioner of Canada (OPCC) reviewed a preliminary Privacy Impact Assessment and CATSA accepted recommendations from the OPCC. In October 2009, an Assistant Privacy Commissioner, Chantal Bernier, announced that the OPCC had tested the scanning procedure, and the privacy safeguards that CATSA had agreed to would “meet the test for the proper reconciliation of public safety and privacy”. In January 2010, Transport Canada confirmed that 44 scanners had been ordered, to be used in secondary screening at eight Canadian airports. The announcement resulted in controversies over privacy, effectiveness and whether the exemption for those under 18 would be too large a loophole.

Scanners are currently used in Saskatoon (YXE), Toronto (YYZ), Montréal (YUL), Quebec (YQB), Calgary (YYC), Edmonton (YEG), Vancouver (YVR), Halifax (YHZ), and Winnipeg (YWG).

=== Philippines ===
Ninoy Aquino International Airport in Manila installed body scanners from Smiths in all four airport terminals in 2015. The scanners are not yet in use, and are controversial among some airport security screeners.

== Other applications ==
Scanners can be used for 3D physical measurement of body shape for applications such as apparel design, prosthetic devices design, ergonomics, entertainment and gaming.

== See also ==
- Backscatter X-ray (in security scanning applications)
- Explosives trace-detection portal machine (puffer machine)
- Full body scanner
- Security theater
- Electromagnetic radiation
- Extremely high frequency
- Microwave
