= Full body scanner =

Device which detects objects in or around a person's body

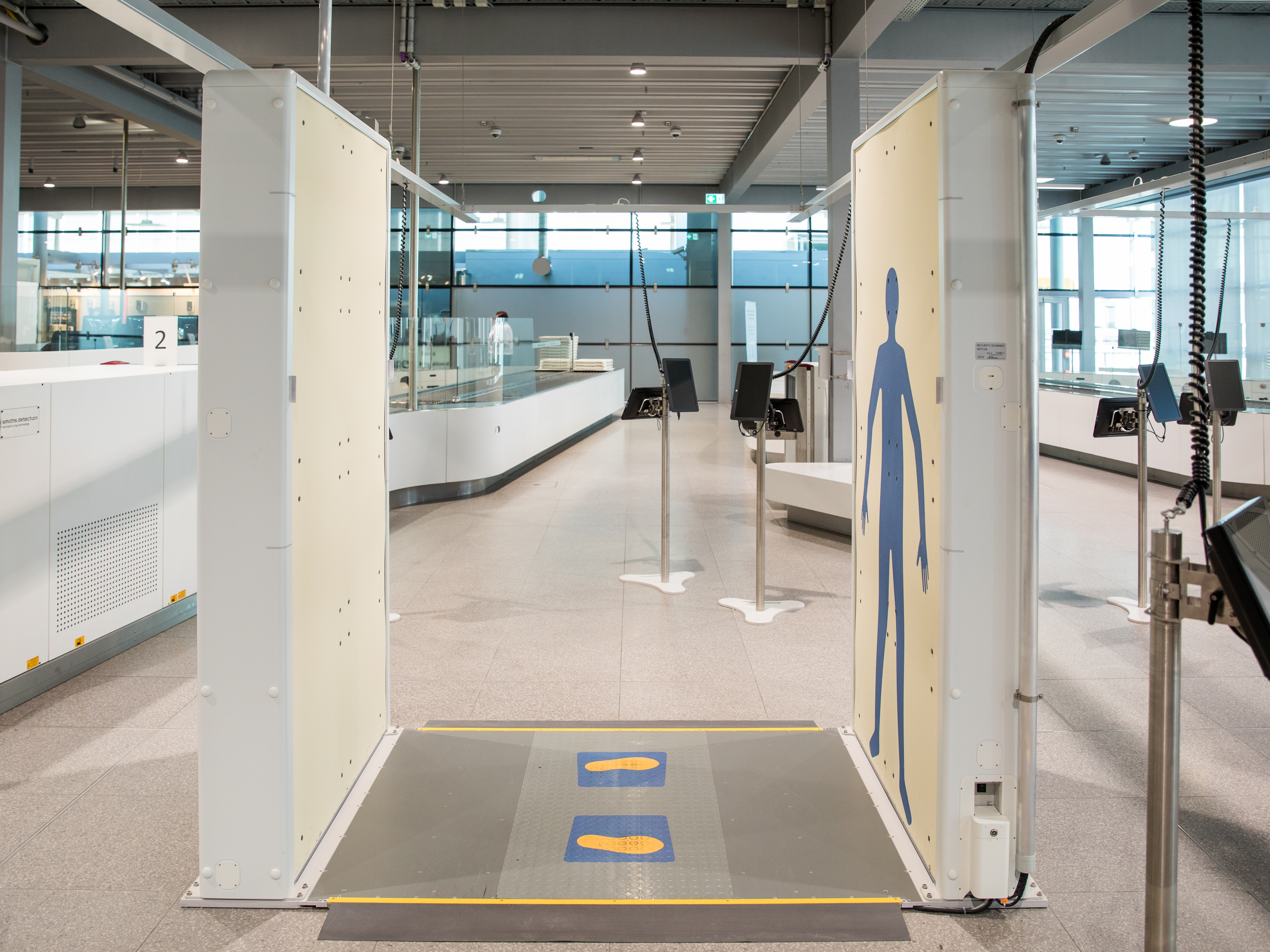
Full body scanner in millimeter wave scanners technique at Cologne Bonn Airport

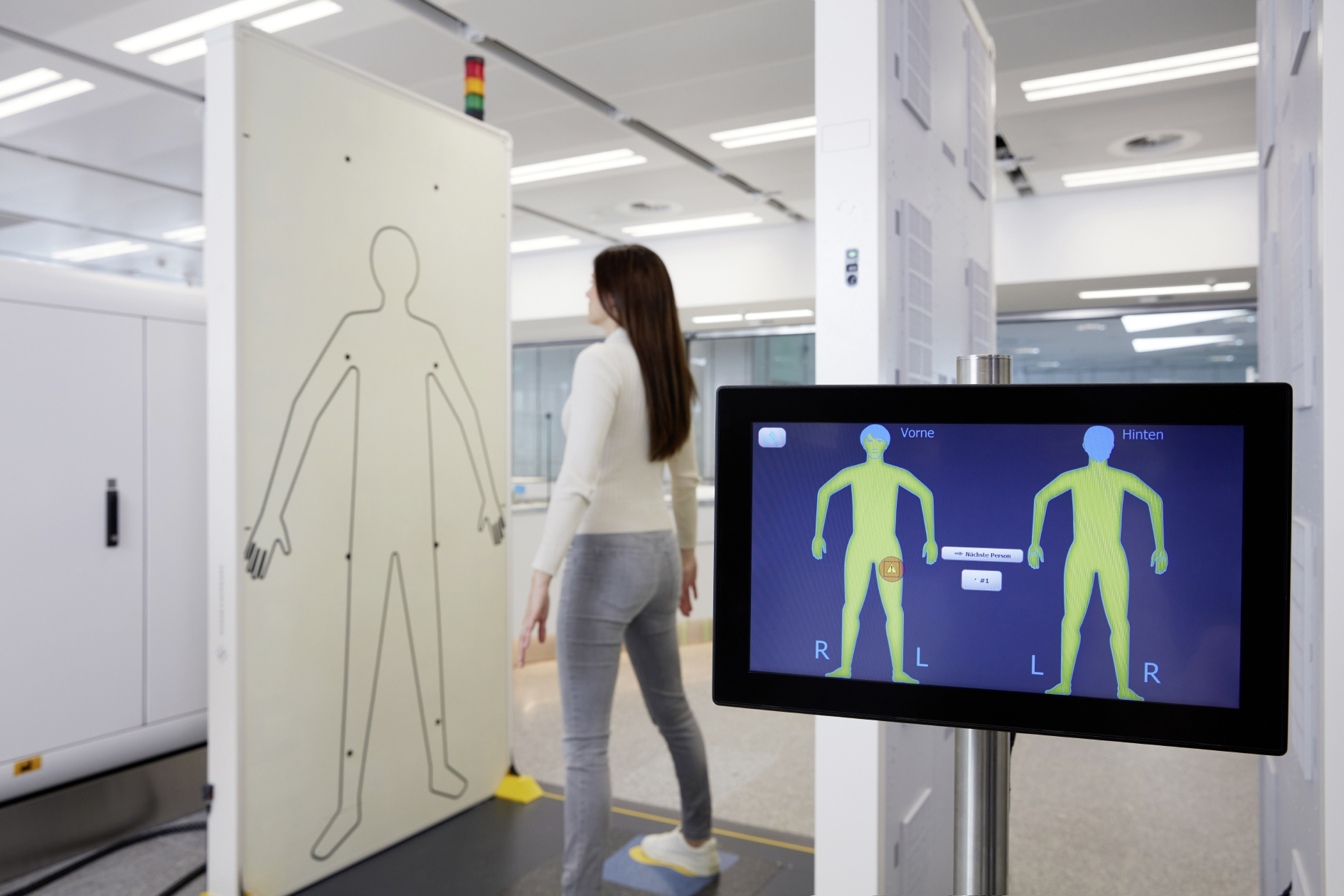
Image from an active millimeter wave body scanner

A full-body scanner is a device that detects objects on or inside a person's body for security screening purposes, without physically removing clothes or making physical contact. Unlike metal detectors, full-body scanners can detect non-metal objects, which became an increasing concern after various airliner bombing attempts in the 2000s. Some scanners can also detect swallowed items or items hidden in the body cavities of a person. Starting in 2007, full-body scanners started supplementing metal detectors at airports and train stations in many countries.

Three distinct technologies have been used in practice:

- Millimeter wave scanners use non-ionizing electromagnetic radiation similar to that used by wireless data transmitters, in the extremely high frequency (EHF) radio band (which is a lower frequency than visible light). The health risks posed by these machines are still being studied, and the evidence is mixed, though millimeter wave scanners do not generate ionizing radiation.
- X-ray-based scanners
  - Backscatter X-ray scanners use low dose radiation for detecting suspicious metallic and non-metallic objects hidden under clothing or in shoes and in the cavities of the human body. The dosage of radiation received is usually between 0.05 and 0.1 μSv Considerable debate regarding the safety of this method sparked investigations, ultimately leading multiple countries to ban the usage of them.
  - Transmission X-ray scanners use higher dosage penetrating radiation which passes through the human body and then is captured by a detector or array of detectors. This type of full body scanners allows to detect objects hidden not only under the clothes, but also inside the human body (for example, drugs carried by drug couriers in the stomach) or in natural cavities. The dosage received is usually not higher than 0.25 μSv and is mainly regulated by the American radiation safety standard for personal search systems using gamma or X-ray radiation
- Infra-red thermal conductivity scanners do not use electromagnetic radiation to penetrate the body or clothing, but instead use slight temperature differences on the surface of clothing to detect the presence of foreign objects. Thermal conductivity relies on the ability of contraband hidden under clothing to heat or cool the surface of the clothing faster than the skin surface. Warm air is used to heat up the surface of the clothing. How fast the clothing cools is dependent, in part, on what is beneath it. Items that cool the clothing faster or slower than the surface of the skin will be identified by a thermal image of the clothing. These scanners are less often used compared to X-ray-based and mmWave-based scanners.

Passengers and advocates have objected to images of their naked bodies being displayed to screening agents or recorded by the government. Critics have called the imaging virtual strip searches without probable cause, and have suggested they are illegal and violate basic human rights. However, current technology is less intrusive and because of privacy issues most people are allowed to refuse this scan and opt for a traditional pat-down. Depending on the technology used, the operator may see an alternate-wavelength image of the person's naked body, merely a cartoon-like representation of the person with an indicator showing where any suspicious items were detected, or full X-ray image of the person. For privacy and security reasons, the display is generally not visible to other passengers, and in some cases is located in a separate room where the operator cannot see the face of the person being screened. Transmission X-ray scanners claim to be more privacy neutral as there is almost no way to distinguish a person but they also have software able to hide privacy issues.

== History ==
The first (ultra-low-dose backscatter X-ray) full body security scanner was developed by Dr. Steven W Smith, who developed the Secure 1000 whole body scanner in 1992. He subsequently sold the device and associated patents to Rapiscan Systems, who now manufacture and distribute the device.

Safety aspects of the Secure 1000 have been assessed in the US by the Food and Drug Administration, the National Council on Radiation Protection and Measurements and other independent sources since the early 1990s.

In 2000, Dr. Vladimir Linev patented a system for scanning a person based on transmission (penetrating) X-ray technology focused on the search for unwanted objects and contraband, which was later the base for CONPASS body scanner.

The first millimeter-wave full body scanner was developed at the Pacific Northwest National Laboratory (PNNL) in Richland, Washington. The operation is one of the four national laboratories Battelle manages for the U.S. Department of Energy. In the 1990s, they patented their 3-D holographic-imagery technology, with research and development support provided by the TSA and the Federal Aviation Administration (FAA). In 2002, Silicon Valley startup SafeView, Inc. obtained an exclusive license to PNNL's (background) intellectual property, to commercialize their technology. From 2002 to 2006, SafeView developed a production-ready millimeter body scanner system, and software which included scanner control, algorithms for threat detection and object recognition, as well as techniques to conceal raw images in order to resolve privacy concerns. During this time, SafeView developed foreground IP through several patent applications. By 2006, SafeView's body scanning portals had been installed and trialed at various locations around the globe. They were installed at border crossings in Israel, international airports such as Mexico City and Amsterdam's Schiphol, ferry landings in Singapore, railway stations in the UK, government buildings like The Hague, and commercial buildings in Tokyo. They were also employed to secure soldiers and workers in Iraq's Green Zone. In 2006, SafeView was acquired by L-3 Communications. From 2006 and 2020, L-3 Communications (later L3Harris) continued to make incremental enhancements to their scanner systems, while deploying thousands of units worldwide. In 2020, Leidos acquired L3Harris, which included their body scanner business unit.

The first passive, non-radiating full body screening camera device was developed by Lockheed Martin through a sponsorship by the National Institute of Justice (NIJ)'s Office of Science and Technology and the United States Air Force Research Laboratory. Proof of concept was conducted in 1995 through the Defense Advanced Research Projects Agency (DARPA). Rights to this technology were subsequently acquired by Brijot Imaging Systems, who further matured a commercial-grade product line and now manufacture, market and support the passive millimeter wave camera devices.

== Usage ==
Video from the TSA explaining the procedure

Schiphol in the Netherlands was the first airport in the world to implement SafeView's millimeter-wave body scanner on a large scale after a test with flight personnel the previous year. On May 15, 2007, two of 17 purchased security scans were installed.

The Italian government had planned to install full-body scanners at all airport and train stations throughout the country, but announced in September 2010 plans to remove the scanners from airports, calling them "slow and ineffective".

The European Union currently allows member states to decide whether to implement full body scanners in their countries:

It is for each member state to decide to authorise the use of scanners in national airports. That will not change ... But where this scanning technology is used it should be covered by EU-wide standards on detection capability as well as common safeguards to ensure compliance with EU health and fundamental rights provisions.

— EU Transport Commissioner Siim Kallas

=== Australia ===
In Australia, the government has decided a no opt-out policy will be enforced in relation to screening at airports. Persons with medical or physical conditions that prevent them from undertaking a body scan will be offered alternative screening methods suitable to their circumstances. Infants and young children under 140 cm will not be selected to undergo a body scan. Body-scanners are being used at eight of Australia's international airports – Adelaide, Brisbane, Cairns, Darwin, Gold Coast, Melbourne, Perth and Sydney. So far only passengers exiting via international flights are affected. Domestic and international passengers departing Newcastle Port Stephens airport have been subject to body scanning since October 2019. Passengers who refuse a scan may be banned from flying. The scanners proposed to be used in Australia have shown a high rate of error in testing. Public outrage over the nude images created by the body scanners being collected by policy resulted in a lawsuit in 2010 to stop body scanning.

=== Canada ===
In Canada, 24 airports currently have these scanners in use, using millimeter-wave technology. Transport Canada notes that "Passengers selected for a secondary search can choose between the full body scanner or a physical search."

=== United States ===
In the U.S. full-body scanners have been installed at train stations, subways, penitentiaries and airports. In 2012, the United States Department of Homeland Security deployed full body scanners to assist the United States Secret Service.

After having previously used X-ray-based scanners the TSA currently uses Millimeter Wave AIT scanners exclusively, which show no identifying characteristics of the person being scanned. Instead, a generic outline of a person is used. As of December 2015, "While passengers may generally decline AIT screening in favor of physical screening, TSA may direct mandatory AIT screening for some passengers as warranted by security considerations in order to safeguard transportation security."

Regarding privacy concerns the Transportation Security Administration (TSA) has stated in 2010 that they "[have] not, will not and the machines cannot store images of passengers at airports". However the TSA later disclosed, in a response to the house chair on homeland security, that its procurement of airport scanners requires manufacturers to include image storage and transmission features but that these features should be disabled before being placed in an airport. The TSA shows 45 individuals have the ability to turn these machines into 'test mode' which enables recording images, but states that they would never do this on a production system. The US Marshal Service did operate a backscatter machine in a courthouse that records images. However, in a statement, they noted that only individuals involved in a test were recorded. A sample of these images was received and disseminated by Gizmodo in 2010, using a Freedom Of Information Request. It is not clear if the US Marshal service has put these new scanning machines, that have recording capabilities, into production. The analyst is in a different room and is not supposed to be able to see the person being scanned by the Backscatter X-ray AIT, but is in contact with other officials who can halt the scanned person if anything suspicious shows up on the scan.

US Penitentiary is also constantly purchasing X-ray full-body scanners for contraband and weapons detection purposes. The scanners are generally Transmission X-ray scanners since these are the only devices capable of detecting metallic and non-metallic contraband hidden underneath clothing as well as contraband hidden inside body cavities.

=== United Kingdom ===
Civil rights groups in Britain in 2010 argued that the body scanning of children contravened the law relating to child pornography.

Passive infra-red scanners have been developed for use in public spaces to collect and analyze natural heat radiation given off by the human body to detect both metallic and non-metallic "threat objects". No external radiation source is used and privacy is preserved as no body details are revealed. Police are conducting a trial of the equipment at London rail stations.

=== Asia Pacific ===
During the forecast period of 2020–2025, the Asia–Pacific region is projected to grow at the highest market CAGR (Compound Annual Growth Rate). The growth of this region is possibly due to the high airport investments and improvements in prison systems. China and India are heavily investing in greenfield airport construction. In January 2020, the Indian government decided to equip 84 airports with full-body scanners, which has led the Indian market to grow at a higher rate.

== Controversies ==
=== Privacy ===
Some argue that using a full-body scanner is equivalent to a strip search, and if used without probable cause violates basic human rights.

Full-body scanning allows screeners to see the surface of the skin under clothing. Prosthetics including breast prostheses and prosthetic testicles may require a potentially embarrassing physical inspection once detected. The scanners can also detect other medical equipment normally hidden, such as colostomy bags and catheters. The transgender community also has privacy concerns that body scanners could lead to their harassment.

In the UK, in 2010, the Equality and Human Rights Commission argued that full-body scanners were a risk to human rights and might be breaking the law.

In 2010 the National Human Rights Commission of Korea opposed the use of full-body scanners and recommended that they not be deployed at airports.

Opponents in the US argue that full body scanners and the new TSA patdowns are unconstitutional. A comprehensive student note came out in the Fall 2010 issue of the University of Denver Transportation Law Journal arguing that full-body scanners are unconstitutional in the United States because they are (1) too invasive and (2) not effective enough because the process is too inefficient.

In the United States, in 2010 the TSA required that their full-body scanners "allow exporting of image data in real time", and cases of the government's storing of images have been confirmed.

Travelers at U.S. airports have complained that when they opted not to be scanned, they were subjected to a new type of invasive pat-down that one traveler in 2010 described as "probing and pushing ... in my genital area." Another traveler in the United States complained in 2010 that the TSA employee "inserted four fingers of both hands inside my trousers and ran his fingers all the way around my waist, his fingers extending at least 2–3 inches below my waistline."

A ruling of the European Council in 2013 required that persons analyzing the image shall be in a separate location and the image shall not be linked to the screened person.

As of December 15, 2015 the TSA published a new policy which required AIT to be "mandatory" for "some" passengers for "security reasons". However, most individuals in the US can still opt out of the scanner and choose a pat-down if they are uncomfortable going through the scanner. Individuals also have the right to be patted down in a private room and have it witnessed by a person of the individual's choice.

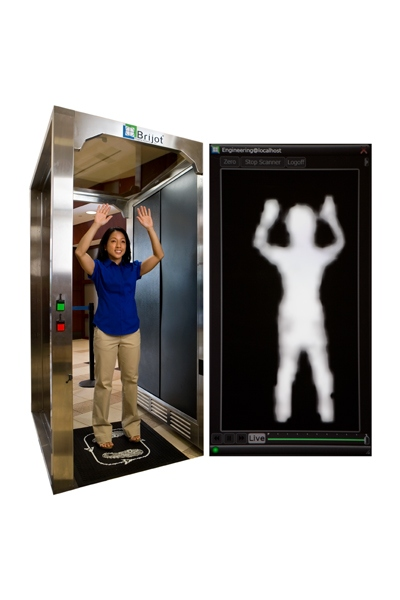
Passive millimeter wave image and subject being screened

=== Treatment of minorities ===
Current backscatter and millimeter wave scanners installed by the TSA are unable to screen adequately for security threats inside turbans, hijab, burqas, casts, prosthetics and loose clothing. This technology limitation of current scanners often requires these persons to undergo additional screening by hand or other methods and can cause additional delay or feelings of harassment.

According to a manufacturer of the machines, the next generation of backscatter scanners will be able to screen all types of clothing. These improved scanners have been designed to equalize the screening process for religious minorities.

=== Health concerns ===
Health concerns relating to the use of full-body scanning technology are present, especially pertaining to the use of X-ray scanners. The issue is mainly regulated by ANSI 43.17.2009, which limits the dose on a per-person basis. However this 2010-era document is intended to apply primarily in the context of standard civilian-airport security. It is generally not considered applicable to unusual terrorism-threat detection concerns in high-security environments (prisons, special-purpose airports) or military institutions. Nor is ANSI 43.17.2009 considered to be the appropriate standard for highly concealed threats such as liquid bombs inside body cavities or swallowed drugs. Due to fundamental physical limitations of how each type of detection technology functions, these highly covert types of threats are impossible to detect by any means other than transmission X-rays.

From the perspective of annual dosage, the ANSI 43.17.2009 standard stipulates that a transmission X-ray dosage of 0.25 μSv per scan, in conjunction with an annual total limit at 250 μSv, equates to a per-person maximum of such 1000 scans per year for a civilian-aviation passenger. However, counting all medical X-ray procedures (as a typical person might undergo in an average year), and if the total annual dose of 250 μSv is taken to include all medical-related doses, then the number of flights/scans permitted for that person could be greatly reduced, assuming that transmission-type X-ray technology is used at each security screening that the civil-aviation passenger undergoes. But because the medical X-ray dosages vary tremendously (over several orders of magnitude) depending on the diagnostic procedures that the patient is subjected to, the proportional contribution of airport-security X-raying to the person's total annual dosage cannot be calculated unless an accounting of the medical X-ray dosages is also present.

==== Millimeter wave scanners ====
Currently adopted millimeter wave scanners operate in the millimeter or sub-terahertz band, using non-ionizing radiation, and have no proven adverse health effects, though no long-term studies have been done. Thomas S. Tenforde, president of the National Council on Radiation Protection and Measurements, said in 2010 that millimeter wave scanners are probably within bounds [of standards for safe operation], but there should be an effort to verify that they are safe for frequent use.

==== Backscatter X-ray scanners ====
In the United States, the FAA Modernization and Reform Act of 2012 required that all full-body scanners operated in airports by the Transportation Security Administration use "Automated Target Recognition" software, which replaces the picture of a nude body with the cartoon-like representation. As a result of this law, all backscatter X-ray machines formerly in use by the Transportation Security Administration were removed from airports by May 2013, since the agency said the vendor (Rapiscan) did not meet their contractual deadline to implement the software.

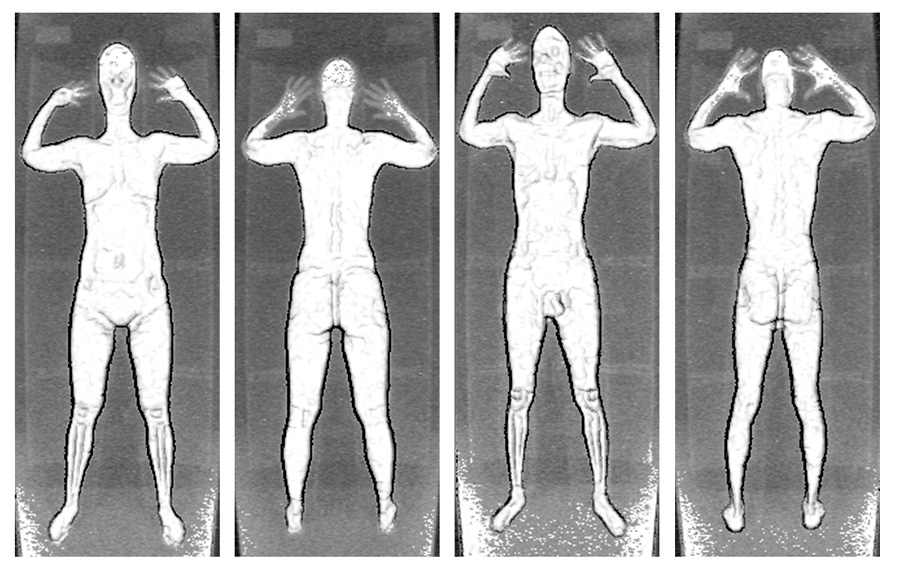
Some backscatter technology produces an image that resembles a chalk etching, though other configurations produce much more detailed images, and there is still a possibility that the lower quality images can be easily switched to a higher resolution.

Several radiation safety authorities including the National Council on Radiation Protection and Measurements, The Health Physics Society, and the American College of Radiology, have stated that they are "not aware of any evidence" that full-body scans are unsafe. However, other radiation authorities, including the International Atomic Energy Agency and Nuclear Energy Agency recommend against using ionizing radiation on certain populations like pregnant women and children, and opponents of the devices say that no long-term studies have been done on the health effects of either backscatter X-ray or millimeter wave scanners:

Perhaps the most notable and debated professional opinion in regard to the safety of scanners is the so-called "Holdren Letter" from a number of world-renowned biochemists and biophysics researchers from the University of California to the Assistant to the US President for Science and Technology, Dr. John P. Holdren. The opening paragraph of their letter of concern reads: "We, a number of University of California, San Francisco faculty, are writing—see attached memo—to call your attention to our concerns about the potential serious health risks of the recently adopted whole body back scatter X-ray airport security scanners. This is an urgent situation as these X-ray scanners are rapidly being implemented as a primary screening step for all air travel passengers."

Critics of backscatter X-ray scanners, including the head of the Center for Radiological Research at Columbia University, say that the radiation emitted by some full-body scanners is as much as 20 times stronger than officially reported and is not safe to use on large numbers of persons because of an increased risk of cancer to children and at-risk populations. Researchers at the University of California, San Francisco, (UCSF) have argued that the amount of radiation is higher than claimed by the TSA and body scanner manufacturers because the doses were calculated as if distributed throughout the whole body, but the radiation from backscatter X-ray scanners is focused on just the skin and surrounding tissues:

However other professors in the UCSF radiology department disagree, saying that the radiation dose is low. "The conclusions are wrong", Ronald Arenson, professor of radiology, tells SF Weekly of his own institution's letter. "People who are totally unrelated to radiation wrote it. ... It was senior faculty at UCSF. They're smart people and well-intended, but their conclusions, I think, were off-base. They don't understand how radiation translates to an actual dose in the human body".

Dr. Steve Smith, inventor of the body scanner in 1991, and president of Tek84, one of the companies that produces the machines, has stated that the concerns of Dr. Brenner and UCSF Scientists regarding the skin dose of backscatter scanners are incorrect. He states the values used for X-ray penetration were incorrectly based on the description of the imaging depth which describes what the instrument sees and is a few mm into the skin and the dosage depth which is deeper. He describes experimental proof that the X-rays have the same properties as any other X-rays and the penetration is correct to be averaged over the whole body. Dr. Smith has provided measured data from an operating body scanner to explain his position.

Scanners also concentrate the dose in time, because they deliver a high dose-rate at the moment of exposure. High dose-rate exposure has been shown to cause greater damage than the same radiation dose delivered at lower rates. This raises further questions about comparisons to background radiation.

The U.S. TSA has also made public various independent safety assessments of the Secure 1000 Backscatter X-ray Scanner.

All the same the Inter-Agency Committee on Radiation Safety which includes the International Atomic Energy Agency, Nuclear Energy Agency and the World Health Organization, reported that, "Pregnant women and children should not be subject to scanning, even though the radiation dose from body scanners is 'extremely small'".

It has also been suggested that defects in the machines, damage from normal wear-and-tear, or software errors could focus an intense dose of radiation on just one spot of the body.

Proponents of backscatter X-ray scanners argue that the ANSI N43.17 standard addresses safety requirements and engineering design of the systems to prevent the occurrence of accidental high radiation due to defects and errors in hardware and software. Safety requirements include "fail-safe" controls, multiple overlapping interlocks and engineering design to ensure that failure of any systems result in safe or non-operation of the system to reduce the chance of accidental exposures. Furthermore, TSA requires that certification to the ANSI N43.17 standard is performed by a third party and not by the manufacturer themselves. But there are cases where types of medical scanning machines, operated by trained medical personnel, have malfunctioned, causing serious injury to patients that were scanned. Critics of full-body scanners cite these incidents as examples of how radiation-based scanning machines can overdose people with radiation despite all safety precautions.

The X-rays from backscatter scanners "are a form of ionizing radiation, that is, radiation powerful enough to strip molecules in the body of their electrons, creating charged particles that cause cell damage and are thought to be the mechanism through which radiation causes cancer." Humans are exposed to background radiation every day, anywhere on earth, and proponents of backscatter X-ray scanners say that the devices expose subjects to levels of radiation equivalent to background radiation. Furthermore, when traveling on an airplane, passengers are exposed to much higher levels of radiation than on earth due to altitude. Proponents say that a backscatter X-ray scan is equivalent to the radiation received during two minutes of flying.

The UK Health Protection Agency has also issued a statement that the radiation dose from backscatter scanners is very low and "about the same as one hour of background radiation".

The European Commission issued a report stating that backscatter X-ray scanners pose no known health risk, but suggested that backscatter X-ray scanners, which expose people to ionizing radiation, should not be used when millimeter-wave scanners that "have less effects on the human body" are available.

Assuming all other conditions equal, there is no reason to adopt X‐ray backscatters, which expose the subject to an additional – although negligible – source of ionizing radiations. Other WBI (Whole Body Imaging) technologies should be preferred for standard use. However, the European Commission's report provides no data substantiating the claim that "all other conditions are equal". One area where backscatter X-ray scanners can provide better performance than millimeter wave scanners, for example, is in the inspection of the shoes, groin and armpit regions of the body. The European Commission also recommended that alternate screening methods should be "used on pregnant women, babies, children and people with disabilities".

The U.S. government is also supplying higher-radiation through-body X-ray machines to at least two African countries "for the purposes of airport security – the kind that can see through flesh, and which deliver real doses of radiation. The U.S.-supplied scanners have apparently been deployed at one airport in Ghana and four in Nigeria". This has caused some to question how far the U.S. government intends to go with the technology.

Unions for airline pilots working for American Airlines and US Airways have urged pilots to avoid the full body scanners.

=== Child scanning ===
There is controversy over full-body scanners in some countries because the machines create images of virtual strip searches on persons under the age of 18 which may violate child pornography laws. In the UK, the scanners may be breaking the Protection of Children Act of 1978 by creating images or pseudo-images of nude children.

Parents have complained that their young children are being virtually strip searched, sometimes without their parents present.

=== Ineffectiveness ===
==== Backscatter and millimeter ====
Some critics suggest that full-body scanner technology is ineffective for multiple reasons, including that they can easily be bypassed and a study published in the November 2010 edition of the Journal of Transportation Security suggested terrorists might fool the Rapiscan machines and others like it employing the X-ray "backscatter" technique. A terrorist, the report found, could tape a thin film of explosives of about 15–20 centimeters in diameter to the stomach and walk through the machine undetected.

Terrorists have already evolved their tactics with the use of surgically implanted bombs or bombs hidden in body cavities.

Again, despite the scanners, the TSA has been unable to stop weapons like box cutters and pistols from being carried onto airplanes.

Two alternatives that have been argued for by experts, such as Prof Chris Mayhew from Birmingham University, are chemical-based scanners and bomb-sniffing dogs. Others have argued that passenger profiling, as done by Israeli airport security, should replace full body scanners and patdowns.

==== Transmission (penetrating) ====
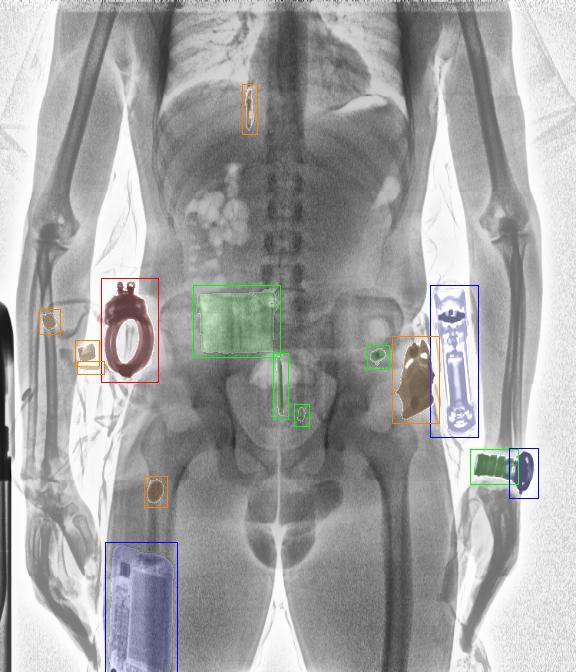
Artificial intelligence software detecting objects on the human body X-ray image in transmission (penetrating) body scanner

Unlike the above, transmission technology allows to detect objects swallowed or hidden inside the objects. This is the main reason it is commonly used in prisons and jails. However the current technology does not allow the dual-energy body scanning (and detecting the object by its atomic number like it is used in baggage or vehicle X-ray scanners) which could give the image the same detection effectiveness as regular black and white X-ray. This leads to the idea that human-held detection (finding threats by looking at the image and finding non-common to the human body items) is the most effective way to find a contraband. However counting a human factor (fatigue, decreased attention) threats still could be missed. Modern software based on Artificial Intelligence in full body scanners is designed to minimize human faults and rise the detection effectiveness of this method.

=== US public opinion ===
A Gallup poll given just after the 2009 Christmas Day bombing attempt suggested that 78% of American airline travelers approved of body scanners while 20% disapproved. 51% indicated that they would have some level of discomfort with full-body scans, while 48% said they would not be uncomfortable with the idea. The poll was given in the context of the 2009 Christmas Day bombing attempt, and some opponents of full body scanners say that the explosives used in that bombing attempt would not have been detected by full-body scanners.

An ABC/Washington Post poll conducted by Langer Associates and released November 22, 2010, found that 64 percent of Americans favored the full-body X-ray scanners, but that 50 percent think the "enhanced" pat-downs go too far; 37 percent felt so strongly. In addition the poll states opposition is lowest amongst those who fly less than once a year.

As of November 23, 2010 an online poll of 11,817 people on The Consumerist website, 59.41% said they would not fly as a result of the new scans. Additionally, as of November 23, 2010, a poll of MSNBC 8,500 online readers indicated 84.1% believe the new procedures would not increase travel safety. According to a CBS telephone poll of 1,137 people published in November 2010, 81% (+/- 5%) percent of those polled approved TSA's use of full-body scans.

=== "No nudity" full-body scanner ===
Millimeter-wave scanner software transitioned to featureless male or female 'cartoons' in 2011, in response to widescale privacy concerns.

Currently, the millimeter-wave scanner monitor shows a generic cookie-cutter-like outline of a person and highlights potential threats. It is the same image no matter the individual's gender, height, or body type. The scanner software recognizes metallic and non-metallic items hiding under clothing. The machine then processes an image using yellow boxes to point out any areas that may need additional screening.

== See also ==
- 3D scanner
- 3D body scanning
- Explosives trace-detection portal machine (puffer machine)
- Full-body CT scan (in medical imaging)
