= NYPD X-ray vans =

X-ray surveillance vehicles operated by the NYPD

The New York City Police Department is reported to have a number of military-grade X-ray vans that contain X-ray equipment for inspecting vehicles.

== Technology and functionality ==
They are described as being able to see into walls and other vehicles using Z backscatter technology. They are estimated to cost between $729,000 and $825,000.

The NYPD has not disclosed how this technology is used as it would reveal investigation techniques, however Police Commissioner William Bratton states that they are not used to scan people for weapons.

According to the New York University School of Law Policing Project, the manufacturer of the vans is American Science and Engineering. The product website for the van depicts a video where the van slowly drives past empty passenger cars, and in real time generates an x-ray image.

The x-ray van manufacturer found that the vans expose bystanders to a 40% larger dose of ionizing radiation than the radiation delivered by airport scanners utilizing similar technology. In airports, The European Union and United States Transportation Security Administration banned the use of this type of radiation technology citing privacy and health concerns such as cancer.

== Legislative controversy ==
On December 18, 2019, the NYCLU submitted testimony in support of Intro. 487, the Public Oversight of Surveillance Technology (“POST”) Act. In it, the NYCLU cited the example of X-ray vans as a violation of privacy, and stated in general that, "Left unchecked, police surveillance has the potential to chill the exercise of First Amendment-protected speech and religious worship, intrude on Fourth Amendment-protected privacy rights, and cast entire communities under a cloak of suspicion in contravention of the Fourteenth Amendment’s guarantee of equal protection."

== Media coverage ==
In 2015 ProPublica issued an Article 78 proceeding in order to have the NYPD respond to FOIL requests to give further information about the usage and health risks of the x-ray technology. Although initially the lower court granted the request, the NYPD issued an appeal and the lower court ruling was overturned.

The NYPD has refused to release details of the uses and operation of these vans. The New York Civil Liberties Union have filed an amici curiae brief in support of a legal action by the journalist Michael Grabell, who is attempting to obtain more information about these vehicles.

The NYU Policing project asserts that exposure to the levels of Ionizing radiation that are used in these vans is linked to increased rates of cancer.

== See also ==
- Backscatter X-ray
- Police surveillance in New York City
