= Puffer machine =

Security device

An explosives trace-detection portal machine, also known as a trace portal machine and commonly known as a puffer machine, is a security device that seeks to detect explosives and illegal drugs at airports and other sensitive facilities as a part of airport security screening. The machines are intended as a secondary screening device, used as a complement to, rather than a substitute for, traditional X-ray machines.

The term "trace-detection" refers to the machine's ability to detect extremely small "traces" of these compounds. The exact sensitivities of these machines are not published, but a mass spectrometer detects compounds on a molecular level and would only be limited by the efficiency of the collection from the air puffed to obtain a sample for analysis.

== Available models and technologies ==
Entry Scan, developed by General Electric, and Ionscan Sentinel II, developed by Smiths Detection, use ion mobility spectrometry (IMS) technology and can detect explosives such as RDX, PETN, TNT, and nitroglycerin. It can also detect controlled substances such as marijuana, cocaine, heroin, PCP, methamphetamine, and MDMA.

The Guardian, developed by Syagen Technology with preconcentration technology licensed from Sandia National Laboratories, is physically similar but internally different. The Guardian uses mass spectrometry (MS) technology, which can detect 16 explosive compounds with 10–100x more sensitivity than IMS, resolve multiple compounds at the same time, and perform shoe bomb detection without removing shoes. The collection technology licensed from Sandia Laboratories is also significantly different from those used in Entry Scan and the Sentinel II. Syagen offers a narcotics screening portal as a separate product.

== Improvements ==
The Sentinel ll, unlike the Sentinel l, "requires less power, has a more modular frame design, which incorporates the compressor into the unit for easier installation and as a result, requires less space". It also "has a more ergonomic design, improved passenger interface and easier maintenance". According to the Transportation Security Administration's website, the machines "can be instantly updated through their vast information technology network to stay ahead of the curve".

The Guardian has been under development since 2001 but was introduced commercially after Entry Scan and The Sentinel. It improved the GE and Smiths Detection machines by providing a MS analyzer rather than IMS analyzer to do the sample analyses and detection. The National Academy of Sciences recommends the use of MS technology over IMS, calling it the "Gold Standard for resolving high-consequence analyses". The Guardian is the first and only trace portal machine that can perform shoe bomb detection as part of its scanning process, resulting in no removal of shoes is required. Most US airports currently require passengers to remove their shoes, a common complaint about airport security hassles.

== Process ==
The machine operates by releasing multiple puffs of air at a passenger who is standing upright within the machine. This will flush out any particles on the person inside the machine then analyze and identify them in seconds. According to an article in the 16 June, 2005, New York Times, it is capable of screening up to 180 passengers an hour. This sample is then analyzed using IMS or MS technology to search for specific explosive or narcotic compounds. If a substance of concern is detected, the security personnel are notified by a visible and/or audible alarm.

== Development ==
The machines were originally developed by Sandia National Laboratories in 1997. Prototypes have been under improvement since 2001 at the Science and Technology division of the Homeland Security Department of the United States. Sandia National Laboratories currently licenses its "puffer" preconcentration collection technology in collaboration with Syagen Technology in the production of the industry's only mass spectrometer-based puffer machine. According to an article in the 3 September, 2006, New York Times, they are also manufactured by General Electric and Smiths Detection using ion mobility spectrometry (IMS) technology at a cost of about $160,000 each. Delays in testing at the Homeland Security Department laboratory and questions about reliability have hindered their deployment. Early models were loud and slow, and required a lot of power. Durability has also been a concern. Trace portal machines are currently the only airport screening devices that automatically examine passengers for explosives.

== Usage ==
At their peak, about 95 machines were installed in 34 airports. The majority of these were GE's Entry Scan and a few were Smith's Sentinels. According to an article on the 10 October, 2007 in USA Today, the TSA had planned on installing 434 machines; however, due to maintenance problems, they have halted installation and "have no plans to acquire more." The Department of Homeland Security (DHS) has reported involvement with Syagen's MS trace portal machine recently, funding them in 2008 with one unit tested at Orange County Airport shortly afterwards. At most airports, the machines were replaced either by millimeter wave scanners or backscatter X-ray machines.

As well as having been implemented in US airports, there are also puffer machines at the Statue of Liberty (GE EntryScan3), just before visitors enter the statue itself. This is one example of the many increased security measures taken for popular New York landmarks post September 11, 2001.

The Israeli Border Police use trace portal machines at border crossings into areas under their jurisdiction such as the Allenby Bridge.

Three machines are installed at the security check for the CN Tower in Toronto, Canada.

Five machines are also currently operating at the "Gentilly-2" nuclear plant in Quebec.

== See also ==
- Full body scanner
- Millimeter wave scanner
- Backscatter X-ray
- Explosives trace detector
