= Whole body imaging =

- MeSH: D051598

Whole body imaging (WBI) refers to the display of the entire body in a single procedure. In medical imaging, it may refer to full-body CT scan or magnetic resonance imaging.

It may also refer to different types of Full body scanner technologies used for security screening such as in airports.
