= Customs officer =

Law enforcement official who enforces customs laws

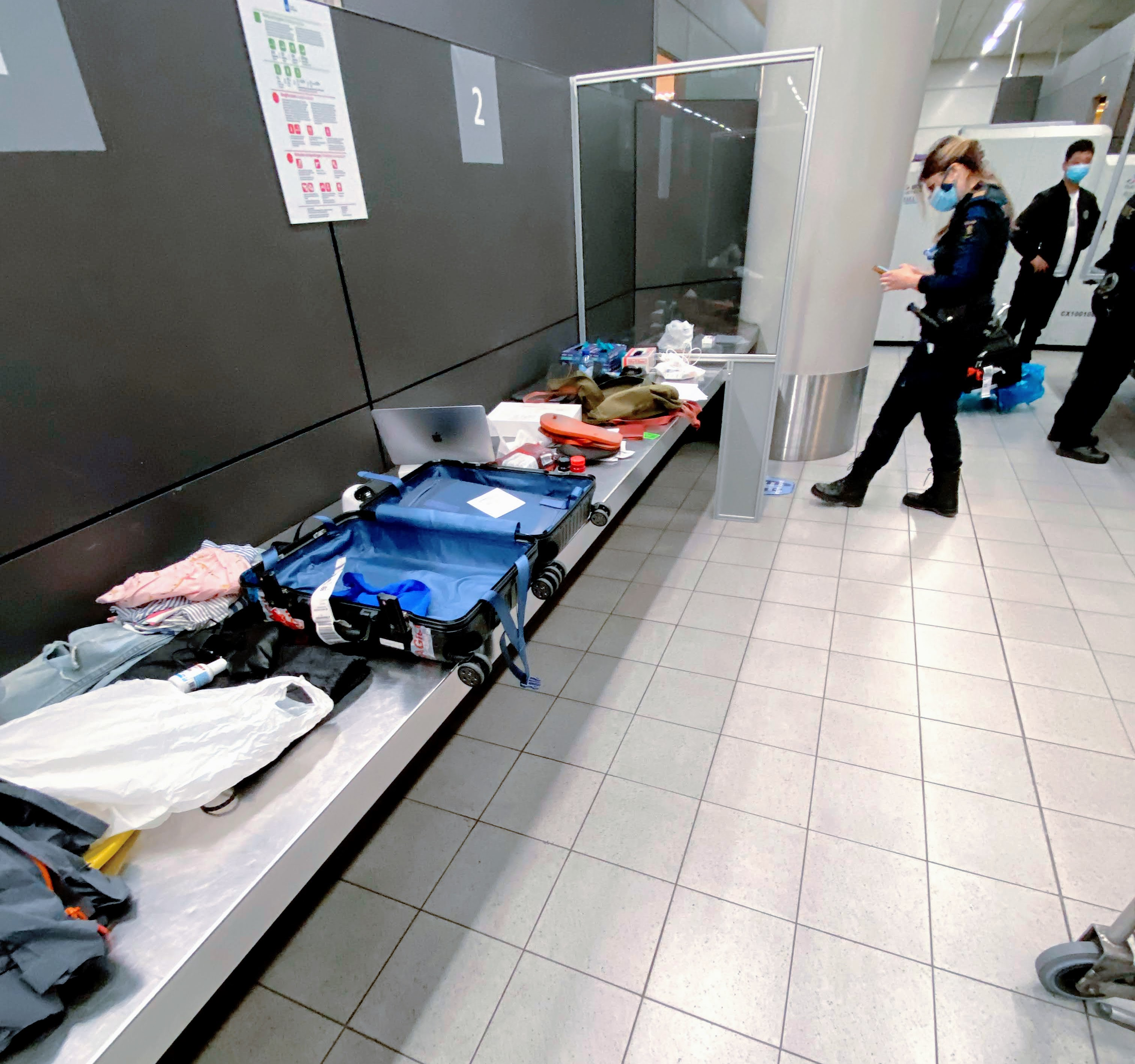
Dutch customs officers at work at Schiphol Airport

A customs officer is a law enforcement official who enforces customs laws. The customs officer makes sure that visitor travellers are not taking goods into the host country without paying taxes.

== Canada ==
Canadian customs officers are members of the Canada Border Services Agency. It was created in 2003 and preceded by the Canada Customs and Revenue Agency (1999-2003). Customs officers has existed since 1868 under various departments: Customs Office, Customs and Inland Revenue from 1918 to 1923, Customs and Excise from 1923 to 1927 and Revenue Department from 1927 to 1999. They are most visible at 117 land border crossings and 13 international airports between Canada and US, but are also founded at 3 seaports, 3 mail centres within Canada.

== Hong Kong ==
4,931 posts, of which nine are directorate officers, 3,804 are members of the Customs and Excise Department, 504 are Trade Controls Officers and 614 are staff of the General and Common Grades.

Hong Kong is one of the busiest container ports in the world. It handled 20.4 million TEUs (Twenty-foot Equivalent Units) in 2003. Of these, 12.1 million TEUs were handled at the Kwai Chung Container Terminal. In 2003, 70,910 ocean-going ships and 365,190 coastal vessels entered and left Hong Kong.

Ships and vessels are subject to customs check. Cargoes are either examined on board sea freighters or after off-loading.

In 2004, a total of 8.6 million passengers arrived in Hong Kong from the Mainland and Macau by sea and by helicopters. They were processed at the China Ferry Terminal in Tsim Sha Tsui and the Hong Kong-Macau Ferry Terminal in Central. In addition, a daily average of 49 helicopter flights between Hong Kong and Macau are operated at the Hong Kong-Macau Ferry Terminal. Four Customs launches conduct maritime patrol in the territorial waters round the clock whereas four high-speed pursuit crafts and two shallow water patrol launches are employed to carry out interception at sea.

The C&ED is an active member of the World Customs Organization (WCO) and Asia Pacific Economic Cooperation (APEC). It exchanges intelligence and works closely with overseas customs administrations and law enforcement agencies. The department has also entered bilateral Cooperative Arrangements with other customs authorities on administrative assistance. At the working level, the department and the China Customs have each established designated liaison officers to facilitate the exchange of intelligence through direct telephone hotlines.

=== Mission ===
- To protect the Hong Kong Special Administrative Region against smuggling
- To protect and collect revenue on dutiable goods
- To detect and deter narcotics trafficking and abuse of narcotic drugs
- To protect intellectual property rights
- To protect consumer interests
- To protect and facilitate legitimate trade and industry and to uphold Hong Kong's trading integrity
- To fulfill international obligations

== United Kingdom ==
=== Ancient usage ===
In ancient usage a "customer" was a person to whom the right to collect customs in a particular port had been granted by the crown, often for a consideration in the form of a farm (an arrangement whereby one rents the income that derives from a revenue stream).

=== Modern usage ===
Officers working for HM Revenue and Customs (HMRC) and the UK Border Force collect a range of taxes and duties, control imported and exported goods, and prevent banned items from entering or leaving the United Kingdom.

The powers of customs officers ("officers") derive from the Customs and Excise Management Act 1979. Officers are appointed by the Commissioners of Revenue and Customs, who are in turn appointed by the King. Failure to return a commission by an officer is an offence, as is imitating or obstructing an officer. Officers at ports are now officially part of the Border Force (Home Office) and as such have their powers conferred by the Borders, Citizenship and Immigration Act 2009.

At any time, any officer may board and search:

- ships within the limits of a port,
- aircraft at aerodromes, or
- vehicles that are:
  - entering, leaving or about to leave the United Kingdom,
  - within the prescribed area,
  - within the limits of or entering or leaving a port or any land adjacent to a port and occupied wholly or mainly for the purpose of activities carried on at the port,
  - at, entering or leaving an aerodrome,
  - at, entering or leaving an approved wharf, transit shed, customs warehouse or free trade zone, or
  - at, entering or leaving any such premises as are mentioned in subsection (1) of section 112 of the 1979 Act.

Officers shall have free access to every part of any ship or aircraft at a port or aerodrome and of any vehicle as described above or is brought to a customs and excise station, and may:

- cause any goods to be marked before they are unloaded from that ship, aircraft or vehicle,
- lock up, seal, mark or otherwise secure any goods carried in the ship, aircraft or vehicle or any place or container in which they are so carried,
- break open any place or container which is locked and of which the keys are withheld, and
- seize any goods found concealed on board any such ship, aircraft or vehicle.

Carrying away an officer is an offence.

Officers may inspect aircraft and aerodromes, and prevent the departure of aircraft if they have not given their permission for them to depart. They may stop ships in UK territorial waters for the purposes of checking that they have been cleared to leave the UK.

Officers may examine any goods carried or to be carried in a coasting ships at any time while they are on board the ship, or at any place in the United Kingdom to which the goods have been brought for shipment in, or at which they have been unloaded from, the ship.

Officers may ask questions with respect to the baggage of people entering or leaving the United Kingdom and any thing contained therein or carried with them. They may inspect such baggage. Since the amendments to CEMA 1979 inserted by the Policing and Crime Act 2009 Officers may also require a person entering or leaving the United Kingdom to produce a Passport (or National ID Card when that may be used as an alternative) and answer questions about their journey. Any person entering the UK from outside the EU who fails to declare any thing or to produce any baggage or thing as required (unless it they are entitled to exemption from duty and tax by virtue of any order under section 13 of the Customs and Excise Duties (General Reliefs) Act 1979) commits an offence. Any thing chargeable with any duty or tax which is found concealed, or is not declared, and any thing which is being taken into or out of the UK contrary to any prohibition or restriction can be seized.

Officers on anti-smuggling duties may haul up, leave or moor vessels where they wish. They may also enter any part of the coast (or of the shore or bank of any river or creek), railway or aerodrome (or land adjoining any aerodrome), and over any land in Northern Ireland within the prescribed area. They may not, however, enter any garden or pleasure ground.

An officer may board or enter any ship, aircraft, vehicle, house or place and take such steps as are reasonably necessary to stop or prevent the sending of a signal or message connected with smuggling.

Officers may seize:

- ships or aircraft that have been in the UK or vehicles that have been in a port or aerodrome and are constructed, adapted, altered or fitted for concealing goods,
- ships that have thrown overboard, staved or destroyed any part of the cargo to prevent seizure while the ship is in United Kingdom waters or where the ship, having been properly summoned to bring to by any vessel in the service of Her Majesty, fails so to do and chase is given,
- ships or aircraft that have been within the limits of any port in the United Kingdom or the Isle of Man, or any aircraft has been in the United Kingdom or the Isle of Man where the master or commander fails to account for a substantial part of the cargo that has been on board.

Officers may fire upon ships liable to forfeiture or examination where they have failed to bring to after the commander of any vessel in the service of Her Majesty has hoisted the proper ensign and caused a gun to be fired as a signal and chase has been given.

Officers may ask any person entering or leaving a free trade zone (as designated by the Treasury) questions with respect to any goods. That person shall, if required by the officer, produce those goods for examination at such place as the Commissioners may direct. Officers may board a vehicle at any time while it is entering or leaving a free trade zone search any part of it. Officers may, at any time, enter upon and inspect a free trade zone and all buildings and goods within the zone.

Officers may enter any premises, vehicles, vessels, aircraft, hovercraft or structures used in connection with an excise licence, and may inspect the premises and search for, examine and take account of any machinery, vehicles, vessels, utensils, goods or materials belonging to or in any way connected with that trade. Officers must be accompanied by a constable at night. If the premises are those of a distiller, rectifier, compounder, brewer for sale, producer of wine, producer of made-wine, maker of cider or occupier of an excise warehouse, an officer, after having demanded admission into the premises and declared his name and business at the entrance may break open any door or window of the premises or break through any wall for the purpose of obtaining admission. Officers or people acting in their aid must be accompanied by a constable at night.

If an officer has reasonable grounds to suspect that any secret pipe or other means of conveyance, cock, vessel or utensil is kept or used by a distiller, rectifier, compounder, registered brewer, producer of wine, producer of made-wine and maker of cider, that officer may, at any time, break open any part of the premises of that trader and forcibly enter them and so far as is reasonably necessary break up the ground in or adjoining those premises or any wall thereof to search for that pipe or other means of conveyance, cock, vessel or utensil.

If the officer finds any such pipe or other form of conveyance leading to or from the trader's premises, he may enter any other premises from or into which it leads, and so far as is reasonably necessary break up any part of those other premises to trace its course, and may cut it away and turn any cock thereon, and examine whether it conveys or conceals any goods chargeable with a duty of excise, or any materials used in the manufacture of such goods, in such manner as to prevent a true account thereof from being taken. Every such pipe or other means of conveyance, cock, vessel or utensil as mentioned, and all goods chargeable with a duty of excise or materials for the manufacture of such goods found therein, may be seized. Officers must be accompanied by a constable at night, and damage caused by unsuccessful searches shall be made good by the Commissioners.

Officers may, at a reasonable time of day, enter any premises used for the conduct of a business. If they have reasonable cause to believe that any premises are used for gaming to which section 10 of the Finance Act 1997 (gaming duty) applies or are used in connection with the supply, importation or exportation of goods of a class or description chargeable with a duty of excise and that any such goods are on those premises, they may inspect those premises and any goods found on them. If they believe serious fraud is occurring in connection with such gaming, they may obtain a court warrant to enter the premises using reasonable force.

Officers may detain any person who has committed, or whom there are reasonable grounds to suspect of having committed, any offence for which he is liable to be detained under the customs and excise Acts at any time within 20 years from the date of the commission of the offence. Officers may seize any ship, aircraft, vehicle, animal, container (including any article of passengers’ baggage) or other thing which has been used for the carriage, handling, deposit or concealment of any thing that has become liable to forfeiture under the customs and excise Acts, or any other thing mixed, packed or found with the thing so liable. They may also seize all the tackle, apparel or furniture in any ship, aircraft, vehicle or animal that has become liable to forfeiture under the customs and excise Acts. Ships (but not their contents) of over 250 tons (but not hovercraft) are exempt unless the voyage itself was the offence that caused the seizure, or the ship was being chased.

Officers may "examine and take account of" any goods:

- which are imported,
- which are in a warehouse or Queen's warehouse,
- which are in a free trade zone,
- which have been loaded into any ship or aircraft at any place in the United Kingdom or the Isle of Man,
- which are entered for exportation or for use as stores,
- which are brought to any place in the United Kingdom for exportation or for shipment for exportation or as stores, or
- in the case of which any claim for drawback, allowance, rebate, remission or repayment of duty is made.

Officers may take samples of certain goods, enter premises with a writ of assistance or search warrant and stop and search vehicles or vessels where there are reasonable grounds to suspect that they are carrying or may be carrying any goods which are:

- chargeable with any duty which has not been paid or secured,
- in the course of being unlawfully removed from or to any place, or
- otherwise liable to forfeiture under the customs and excise Acts

Officers may detain people to search their possessions for dutiable alcoholic liquor, or tobacco products, which are chargeable with any duty of excise, and liable to forfeiture under the customs and excise Acts.

If an officer has reasonable grounds to suspect that

- any person who is on board or has landed from any ship or aircraft,
- any person entering or about to leave the United Kingdom,
- any person within the dock area of a port,
- any person at a customs and excise airport,
- any person in, entering or leaving any approved wharf or transit shed which is not in a port,
- any person in, entering or leaving a free trade zone, or
- in Northern Ireland, any person travelling from or to any place which is on or beyond the boundary

is carrying any article which is chargeable with any duty which has not been paid or secured or (if being imported or exported) of which any prohibition or restriction is in force, they may detain them and search them. This search may be a rub down, strip or intimate search, and must be approved by a superior officer or justice of the peace.

== Sri Lanka ==
In Sri Lanka, as per the Customs Ordinance, enforcement is carried out by the Sri Lanka Customs headed by the Director General of Customs. They wear an all white (without insignia) or khaki (with insignia) uniform.

== United States ==
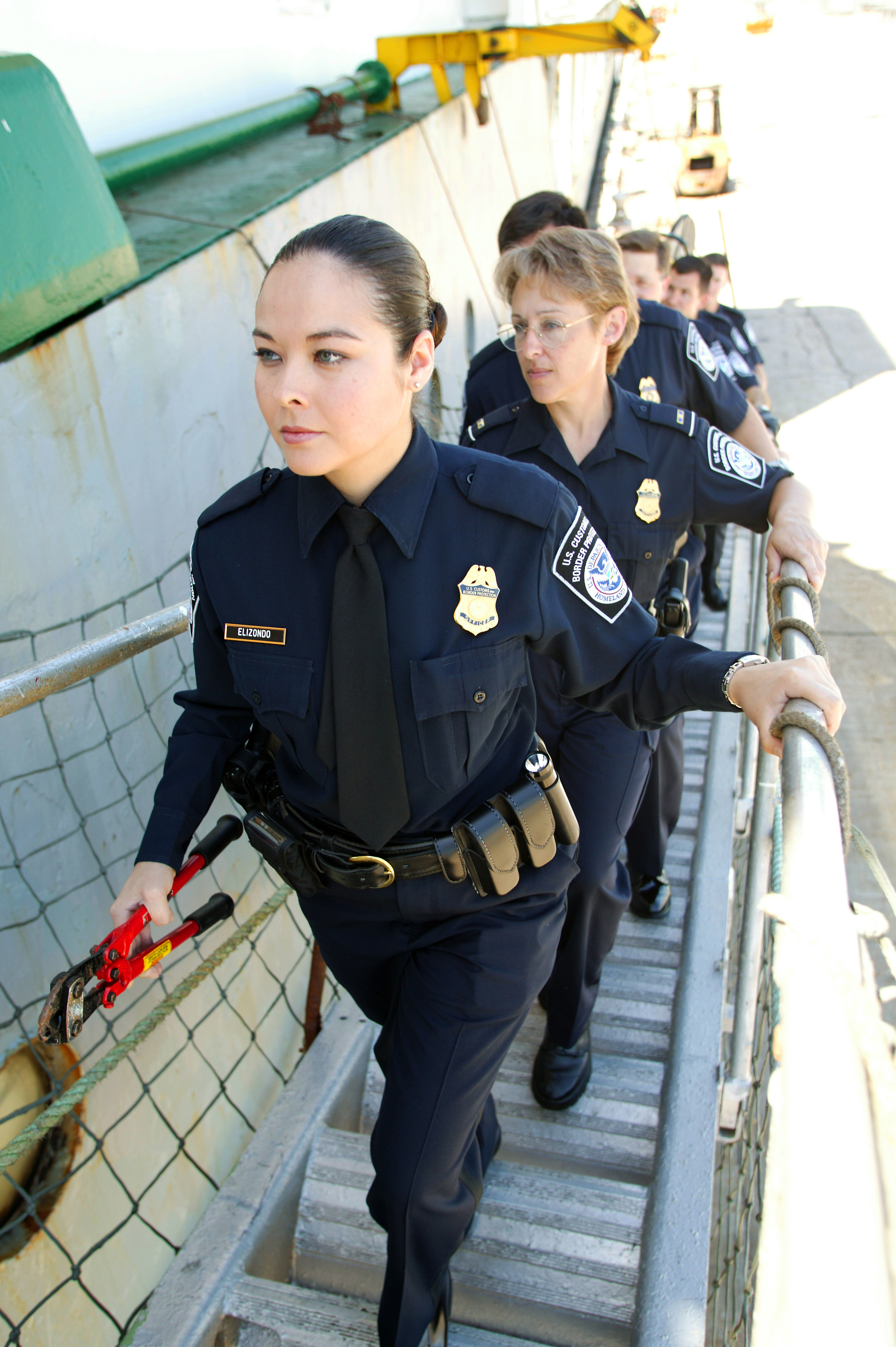
US Officers boarding a ship

In the United States, a customs officer is a federal law enforcement officer working to enforce customs laws as well as over 400 laws for other federal agencies. Customs officers enforce these laws for every person or thing that enters or leaves U.S. Among their many functions are detecting and confiscating contraband, making sure that import duties are paid, and preventing those without legal authorization from entering the United States. In the past, American customs officers were part of the Department of the Treasury, the oldest law enforcement agency in the U.S., dating back to 1789. U.S. Customs (CBP) is the second highest revenue collector in the United States through fines, collection of duties, and illegal money seized; only the IRS collects more money for the federal government. Every day, on average, U.S. Customs arrests 135 suspects of different crimes, seizes 2,313 pounds of narcotics, confiscate 196 firearms, intercept 210 fraudulent documents, prevents 54 criminal aliens from entering the U.S., and detains one suspected terrorist. Customs officers need no probable cause to search, detain, or seize anything or any person. Today customs officers work for the Department of Homeland Security within U.S. Customs and Border Protection (CBP) and U.S. Immigration and Customs Enforcement (ICE) Office of Investigations. They are present at every international airport, seaport, and all land border crossings.
