= Outline of law enforcement =

Overview of and topical guide to law enforcement

The following outline is provided as an overview of and introduction to law enforcement:

Law enforcement – subsystem of society that promotes adherence to the law by discovering and punishing persons who violate rules and norms governing that society. Although the term may encompass entities such as courts and prisons, it most frequently applies to those who directly engage in patrols or surveillance to dissuade and discover criminal activity, and those who investigate crimes and apprehend offenders.

== Essence of law enforcement ==
- The Thin Blue Line
- Criminal law
  - Coming into force
  - Unenforced law
- Law enforcement agency
- Law enforcement officer

=== Disciplines ===
- Criminology
  - Forensic science
  - Penology

=== Basis of law enforcement ===
The reasons law enforcement exists:

- Crime – breaking the law. Without crime, there would be little need for law enforcement.
- Law and order (politics)
  - Criminal law
  - Criminal justice

== Law enforcement agencies ==
Law enforcement agency (list) – government agency responsible for enforcement of laws. Outside North America, such organizations are called police services. In North America, some of these services are called police while some have other names (e.g. sheriff's office/department; investigative police services in the United States are often called bureaus (e.g. FBI, USMS, ICE, CBP, ATF, DEA, USSS etc.).

- Law enforcement agency powers
- Types of law enforcement agencies
  - Police
    - Airport police
    - Border police
    - County police
    - Federal police
    - National Police
    - State police
    - Local police
    - Military police
    - Private police
    - Traffic police
    - Secret police
    - Tribal Police
  - Specialist law enforcement agency
    - Gendarmerie
    - Police tactical unit such as SWAT

== Law enforcement officers ==
- Border patrolman
- Coast guardman
- Constable
- Correctional officer
- Detective
- Federal agent
- Gendarme
- Marshal
- Private investigator
- Peace officer
- Police officer
- Park ranger
- Sheriff’s deputy
- Highway patrolman
- State trooper
- Inspector

== Law enforcement by region ==
- Law enforcement by country
- List of countries and dependencies by number of police officers

== History of law enforcement ==
History of law enforcement

- History of criminal justice
- Police box
- History of law enforcement in China
- History of law enforcement in South Africa
- History of law enforcement in the United Kingdom
- History of law enforcement in the United States

== Law enforcement equipment ==
- Armor
  - Ballistic vest
  - Shield
    - Ballistic shield
    - Riot shield
- Police dog
- Police duty belt
- Police radio
- Police vehicle
- Policeware
- Police psychology
- Weapons
  - Club
  - Taser
  - Firearm
  - Handgun
  - Riot gun
- Uniform
- Uniforms and equipment of the British police

== Law enforcement techniques and procedures ==
- Baton charge
- Body cavity search
- Crime analysis
- Crime displacement
- Crime mapping
- Criminal intelligence
- Crowd control
- Deadly force
- Defendo
- Dignitary Protection
- Door breaching
- Double tap
- Dragnet
- Forcible entry
- Immediate Action Rapid Deployment
- Lawful interception
- Mail cover
- Mozambique drill
- Pain compliance
- Police psychology
- Riot control
- Rough ride
- Search of persons
- Sobriety checkpoints
- Speed trap
- Traffic break
- Tueller Drill
- Use of force

=== Criminal investigation ===
Criminal Investigation – applied science involving the study of facts, used to identify, locate and prove the guilt of a criminal. Modern-day criminal investigations commonly employ many scientific techniques known collectively as forensic science.

- Bait car
- Computer forensics
- Dawn raid
- Facial composite
- FBI method of profiling
- Hunting strategy
- Indictment
- Interrogation
- Manhunt
- Mug shot
- Offender profiling
- Police diving
- Police lineup
- Re-creation
- Search and seizure
- Stakeout
- Sting operation
- Strip search
- Surveillance
- Telephone tapping
- Vehicular accident reconstruction
- Warrant

==== Components of a crime ====
- Criminal – person who committed a crime
- Evidence
  - Forensic science
- Suspect
- Victim

=== Law enforcement training ===
- Police academy
- Police training officer

== Law enforcement issues ==
- Law enforcement and society
- Police accountability
- Police brutality
- Police corruption
- Public security
- Vigilantism

== Law enforcement organizations ==
- Law enforcement organization

== Law enforcement leaders and scholars ==
- Julian Fantino
- J. Edgar Hoover
- Robert Peel
- Garda Síochána
- August Vollmer
- Buford Pusser
- Pahal Singh Lama
- Khadgajeet Baral
- Dil Bahadur Lama

== See also ==
- Outline of law
- Code enforcement
- List of intelligence agencies
- List of protective service agencies
