= Smuggling =

Illegal movement of goods or people

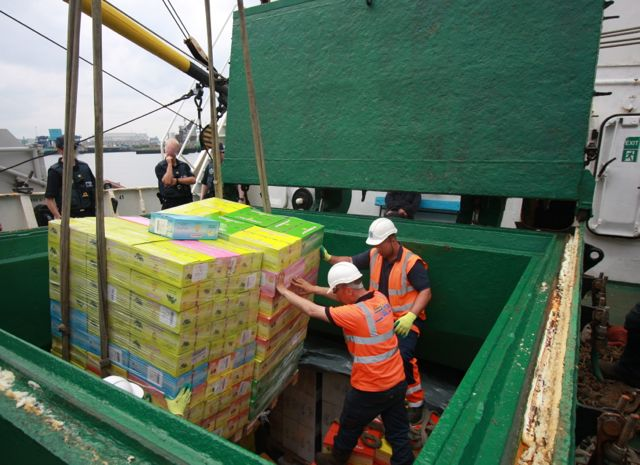
British H.M. Revenue & Customs officers with seized smuggled tobacco, 2014.

Smuggling or trafficking is the illegal and often covert transportation of goods, substances, people or intelligence across a border or in and out of buildings and facilities (such as a prison), in violation of applicable laws or other regulations. More broadly, social scientists define smuggling as the purposeful movement across a border in contravention to the relevant legal frameworks.

There are various motivations to smuggle. These include the participation in illegal trade, such as in the illegal drug trade/cartel, illegal weapons trade, human trafficking, wildlife smuggling or wildlife trade, counterfeiting, game of chance, prostitution, kidnapping, heists, copyright infringement (piracy), chop shops, illegal immigration or illegal emigration, tax evasion, import restrictions, export restrictions, providing contraband to prison inmates, or the theft of the items being smuggled.

Smuggling is a common theme in literature, from Bizet's opera Carmen to the James Bond spy books (and later films) Diamonds Are Forever and Goldfinger.

== Etymology ==
The verb smuggle, from Low German smuggeln or Dutch smokkelen ("to transport (goods) illegally"), apparently a frequentative formation of a word meaning "to sneak", most likely entered the English language during the 1600s–1700s.

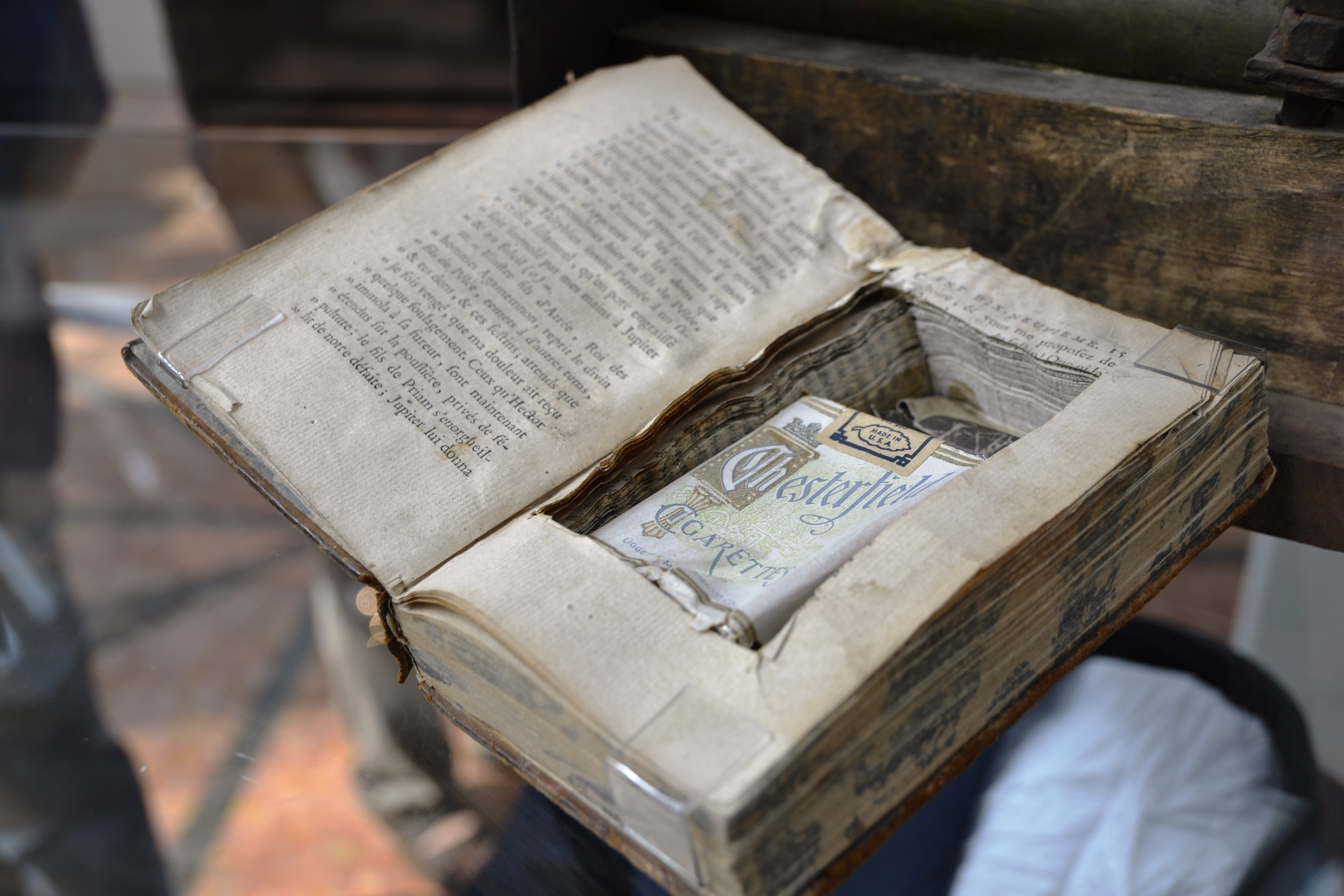
A book with cigarettes

== History ==
Smuggling has a long and controversial history, probably dating back to the first time at which duties were imposed in any form, or any attempt was made to prohibit a form of traffic. Smuggling is often associated with efforts by authorities to prevent the importation of certain contraband items or non-taxed goods; however, there has also been smuggling based on illegally exporting goods. In England smuggling first became a recognised problem in the 13th century, following the creation of a national customs collection system by Edward I in 1275. Medieval smuggling tended to focus on the export of highly taxed export goods — notably wool and hides. Merchants also, however, sometimes smuggled other goods to circumvent prohibitions or embargoes on particular trades. Grain, for instance, was usually prohibited from export, unless prices were low, because of fears that grain exports would raise the price of food in England and thus cause food shortages and civil unrest. Following the loss of Gascony to the French in 1453, imports of wine were also sometimes embargoed during wars to try to deprive the French of the revenues that could be earned from their main export.

Most studies of historical smuggling have been based on official sources — such as court records, or the letters of Revenue Officers. A senior academic of the University of Bristol states that they only detail the activities of those dumb enough to get caught. This has led him and others, such as Prof. H. V. Bowen of the University of Swansea to use commercial records to reconstruct smuggling businesses. Jones' study focuses on smuggling in Bristol in the mid-16th century, arguing that the illicit export of goods like grain and leather represented a significant part of the city's business, with many members of the civic elite engaging in it, whether by disguised/hidden transport or mis-description of goods. Grain smuggling by members of the civic elite, often working closely with corrupt customs officers, has also been shown to have been prevalent in East Anglia during the later 16th century.

In England wool was smuggled to the continent in the 17th century, under the pressure of high excise taxes. In 1724 Daniel Defoe wrote of Lymington, Hampshire, on the south coast of England

I do not find they have any foreign commerce, except it be what we call smuggling and roguing; which I may say, is the reigning commerce of all this part of the English coast, from the mouth of the Thames to the Land's End in Cornwall.

The high rates of duty levied on tea and also wine and spirits, and other luxury goods coming in from mainland Europe at this time made the clandestine import of such goods and the evasion of the duty a highly profitable venture for impoverished fishermen and seafarers. In certain parts of the country such as the Romney Marsh, East Kent, Cornwall and East Cleveland, the smuggling industry was for many communities more economically significant than legal activities such as farming and fishing. The principal reason for the high duty was the need for the government to finance a number of extremely expensive wars with France and the United States.

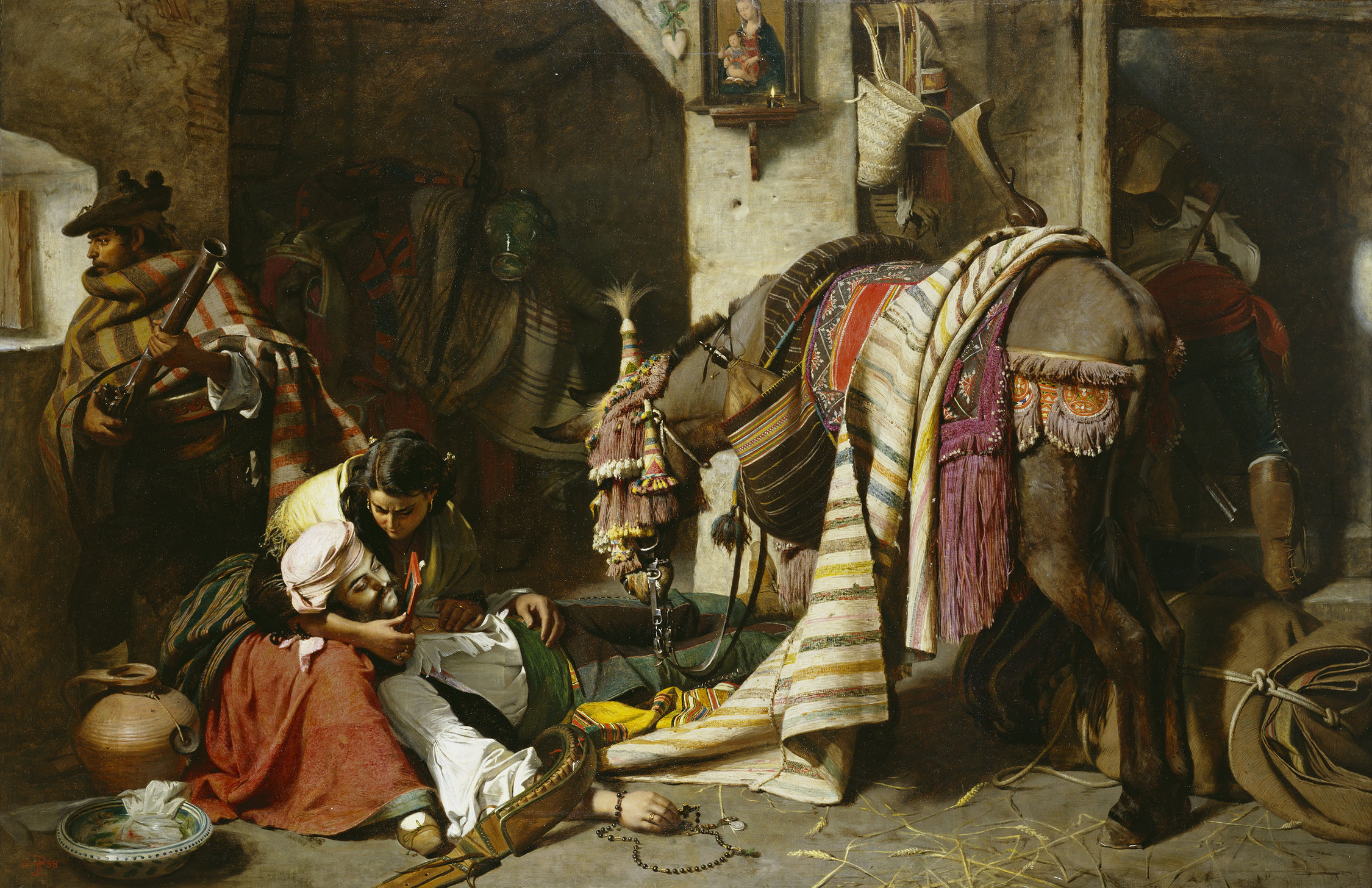
The Dying Contrabandista by John Phillip, 1858

Before the era of drug smuggling and human trafficking, smuggling had acquired a kind of nostalgic romanticism, in the vein of Robert Louis Stevenson's Kidnapped:

Few places on the British coast did not claim to be the haunts of wreckers or mooncussers. The thievery was boasted about and romanticized until it seemed a kind of heroism. It did not have any taint of criminality and the whole of the south coast had pockets vying with one another over whose smugglers were the darkest or most daring. The Smugglers Inn was one of the commonest names for a bar on the coast.

In North America, smuggling in colonial times was a reaction to the heavy taxes and regulations imposed by mercantilist trade policies. After American independence in 1783, smuggling developed at the edges of the United States at places like Passamaquoddy Bay, St. Mary's in Georgia, Lake Champlain, and Louisiana. During Thomas Jefferson's embargo of 1807–1809, these same places became the primary places where goods were smuggled out of the nation in defiance of the law. Like Britain, a gradual liberalization of trade laws as part of the free trade movement meant less smuggling. in 1907 President Theodore Roosevelt tried to cut down on smuggling by establishing the Roosevelt Reservation along the United States–Mexico Border. Smuggling revived in the 1920s during Prohibition, and drug smuggling became a major problem after 1970. In the 1990s, when economic sanctions were imposed on Serbia, a large percent of the population lived off smuggling petrol and consumer goods from neighboring countries. The state unofficially allowed this to continue or otherwise the entire economy would have collapsed.

In modern times, as many first-world countries have struggled to contain a rising influx of immigrants, the smuggling of people across national borders has become a lucrative extra-legal activity, as well as the extremely dark side, people-trafficking, especially of women who may be enslaved typically as prostitutes.

== Types of smuggling ==
=== Goods ===
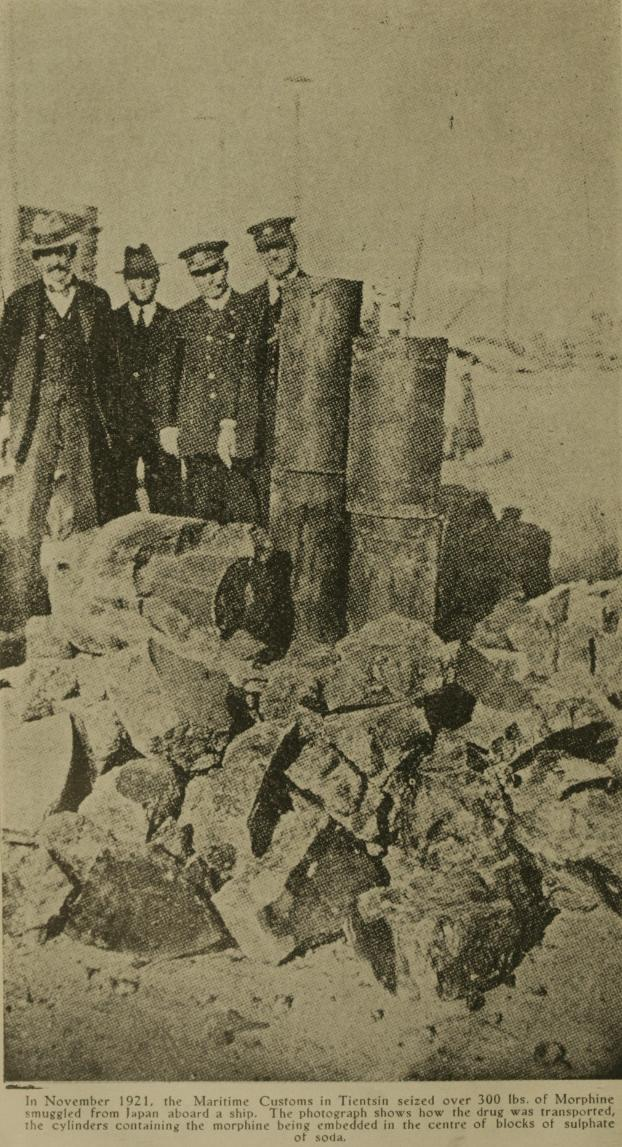
The International Anti-Opium Association, Peking "The War Against Opium"

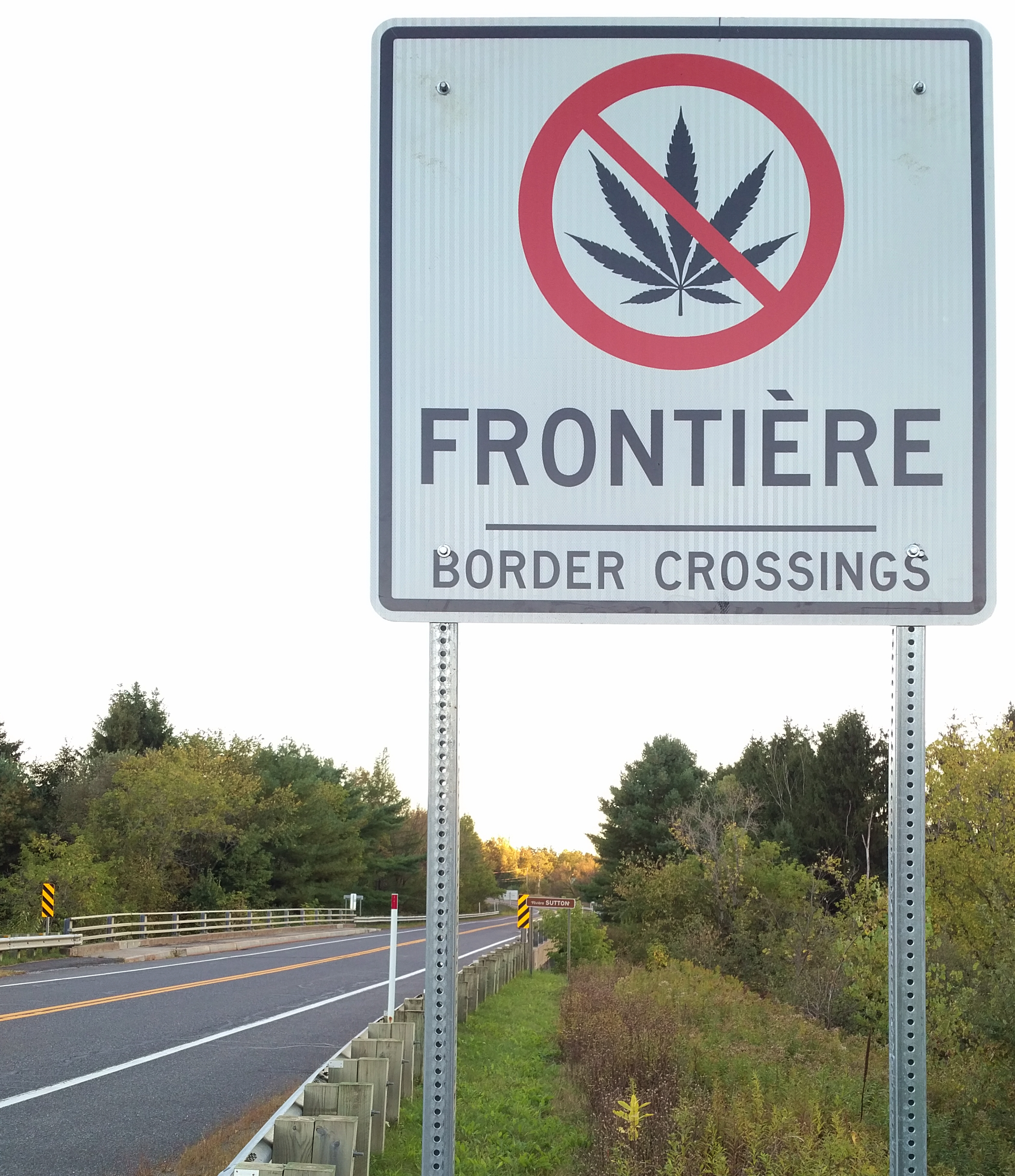
Road sign at the Canada–US border prohibiting cannabis, Abercorn, Québec (2018)

Much smuggling occurs when enterprising merchants attempt to supply demand for a good or service that is illegal or heavily taxed. As a result, illegal drug trafficking, and the smuggling of weapons (illegal arms trade), as well as the historical staples of smuggling, alcohol (rum-running) and tobacco, are widespread. As the smuggler faces significant risk of civil and criminal penalties if caught with contraband, smugglers are able to impose a significant price premium on smuggled goods. The profits involved in smuggling goods appear to be extensive. The iron law of prohibition posits that greater enforcement results in more potent alcohol and drugs being smuggled.

Profits also derive from avoiding taxes or levies on imported goods. For example, a smuggler might purchase a large quantity of cigarettes in a place with low taxes and smuggle them into a place with higher taxes, where they can be sold at a far higher margin than would otherwise be possible. It has been reported that smuggling one truckload of cigarettes within the United States can lead to a profit of US$2 million.

==== Maritime drug smuggling ====
Maritime drug smuggling takes place under conditions that differ from those associated with a single land-border crossing. Maritime routes can connect several jurisdictions, ports and transshipment points before reaching a destination market, while vessels and cargo may pass through multiple commercial and logistical systems along the way. The scale, mobility and transnational character of maritime activity can therefore make responsibility and surveillance more fragmented. Drug smuggling at sea has consequently been conceptualized as a form of "blue crime", referring to serious criminal activity occurring in or across the maritime domain. Research on maritime drug smuggling further shows how ports and shipping routes connect production regions with transit and consumer markets across long-distance supply chains.

Rather than operating through entirely separate transport systems, drug-smuggling networks frequently exploit legitimate commercial shipping and port infrastructure. Maritime drug smuggling can involve sourcing and preparation for export, concealment, maritime transportation and transshipment, retrieval at a destination port, and subsequent inland distribution. These stages resemble functions found in legitimate logistics, including transport planning, storage, cargo handling and distribution, while concealment distinguishes the illicit flow from the legal goods moving through the same systems. Drugs may, for example, be inserted into otherwise legitimate cargo flows and removed at a later stage of the journey.

The actors involved in these operations do not necessarily form a single hierarchical organization. Research on drug-supply networks instead identifies flexible and partly decentralized structures in which organizers, financiers, brokers, transport specialists, facilitators and local distribution groups can perform separate functions. Brokers and intermediaries can be particularly important in connecting geographically separated actors and stages of an operation where direct relationships do not exist. This division of labor can distribute both information and risk across the supply chain, meaning that individual participants may only have knowledge of the specific stage in which they are involved.

Commercial ports form an important part of this system because they connect maritime and land-based transport while concentrating cargo, infrastructure, workers and logistical information. Research on European ports shows that criminal networks can exploit legitimate port processes to conceal, locate and retrieve drug shipments. Access to restricted areas, information about containers and knowledge of port procedures can therefore become valuable resources. Port and logistics workers may knowingly facilitate smuggling, but studies also show that involvement can result from social relationships, financial incentives, pressure or coercion. The available literature does not always make clear whether companies and employees were knowingly involved in smuggling operations or whether their infrastructure and services were used without their awareness.

Smuggling methods vary according to route, cargo and vessel type. Containerized commercial shipping features prominently in the academic literature because illicit consignments can be concealed within large legitimate cargo flows. One commonly referred to incident is the case of MSC Gayane, where nearly 20 tons of cocaine was discovered by US authorities. Other forms of maritime transportation include fishing vessels and smaller craft, which can operate between ports, coastal areas and maritime transit routes. Research on fisheries and drug smuggling shows that fishing vessels can provide both mobility and access to maritime spaces used for transnational drug movements. Studies of ports also demonstrate that smugglers adapt their routes, concealment methods and use of infrastructure in response to changes in policing and security.

Because drug smuggling is deliberately concealed, knowledge about its scale and organization remains incomplete. Academic research often relies on seizures, criminal investigations, court material and detected networks, which provide detailed knowledge about identified cases but cannot directly capture successful undetected shipments. Spatial and supply-chain research therefore treats observed routes and seizures as partial indicators rather than complete measurements of maritime drug flows. The available research nonetheless demonstrates that maritime drug smuggling is embedded in interconnected systems of commercial transport, criminal organization and port logistics rather than consisting only of the physical movement of drugs across a maritime border.

=== People smuggling ===
With regard to people smuggling, a distinction can be made between people smuggling as a service to those wanting to illegally migrate and the involuntary trafficking of people. An estimated 90% of people who illegally crossed the border between Mexico and the United States are believed to have paid a smuggler to lead them across.

People smuggling can be used to rescue a person from oppressive circumstances. For example, when the Southern United States allowed slavery, many slaves moved north via the Underground Railroad. Similarly, during the Holocaust, Jewish people were smuggled out of Germany by people such as Algoth Niska.

In October 2023, Spanish police arrested 11 individuals involved in smuggling migrants hidden in trucks at Algeciras sea border, connected to a network providing forged documents. In the same month, they dismantled another criminal organization focused on supplying fake documents to migrants in Spain, primarily in the agricultural sector.

=== Human trafficking ===
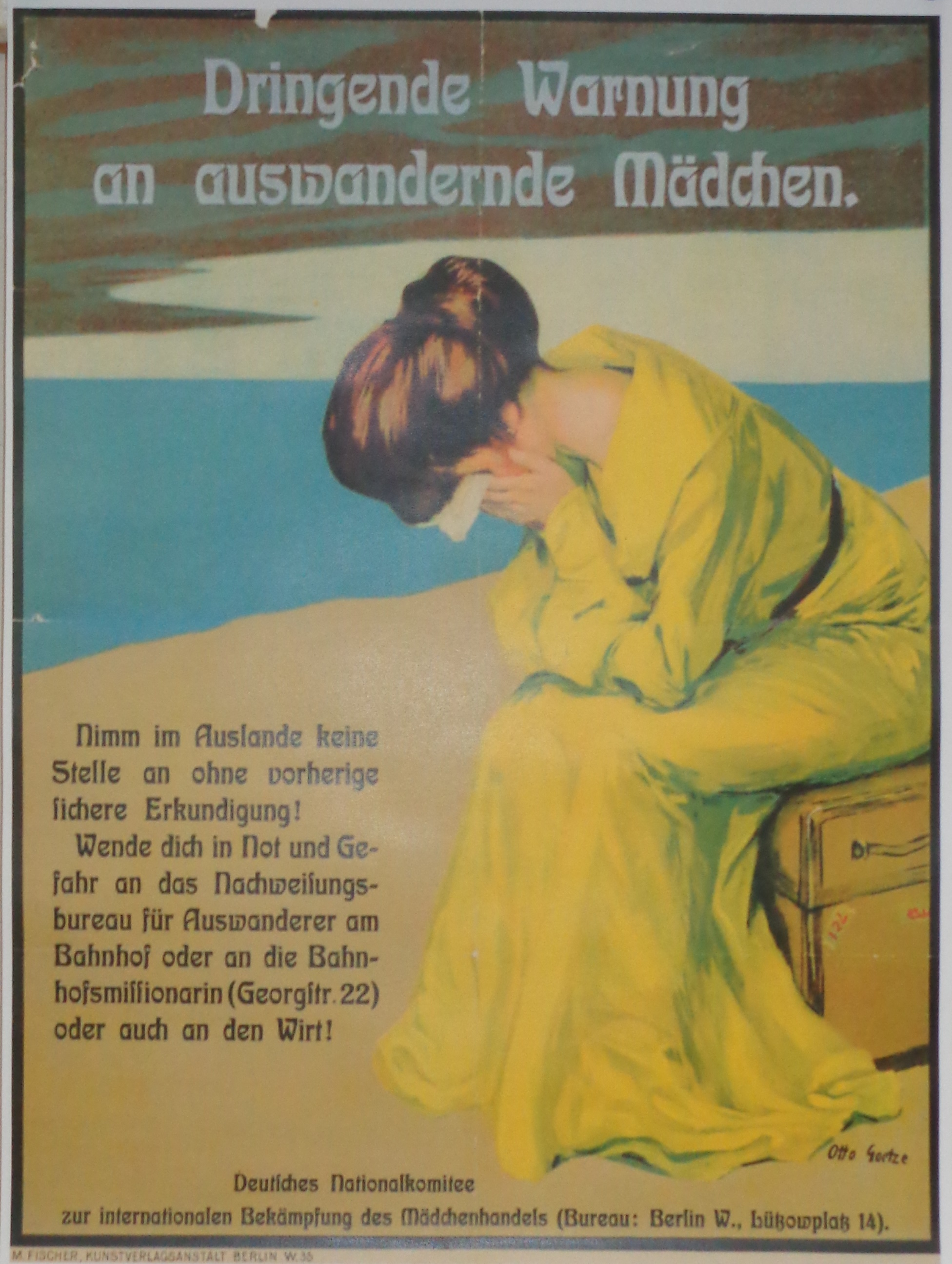
A poster warning the German women and girls about the danger of human traffic in the USA (ca 1900)

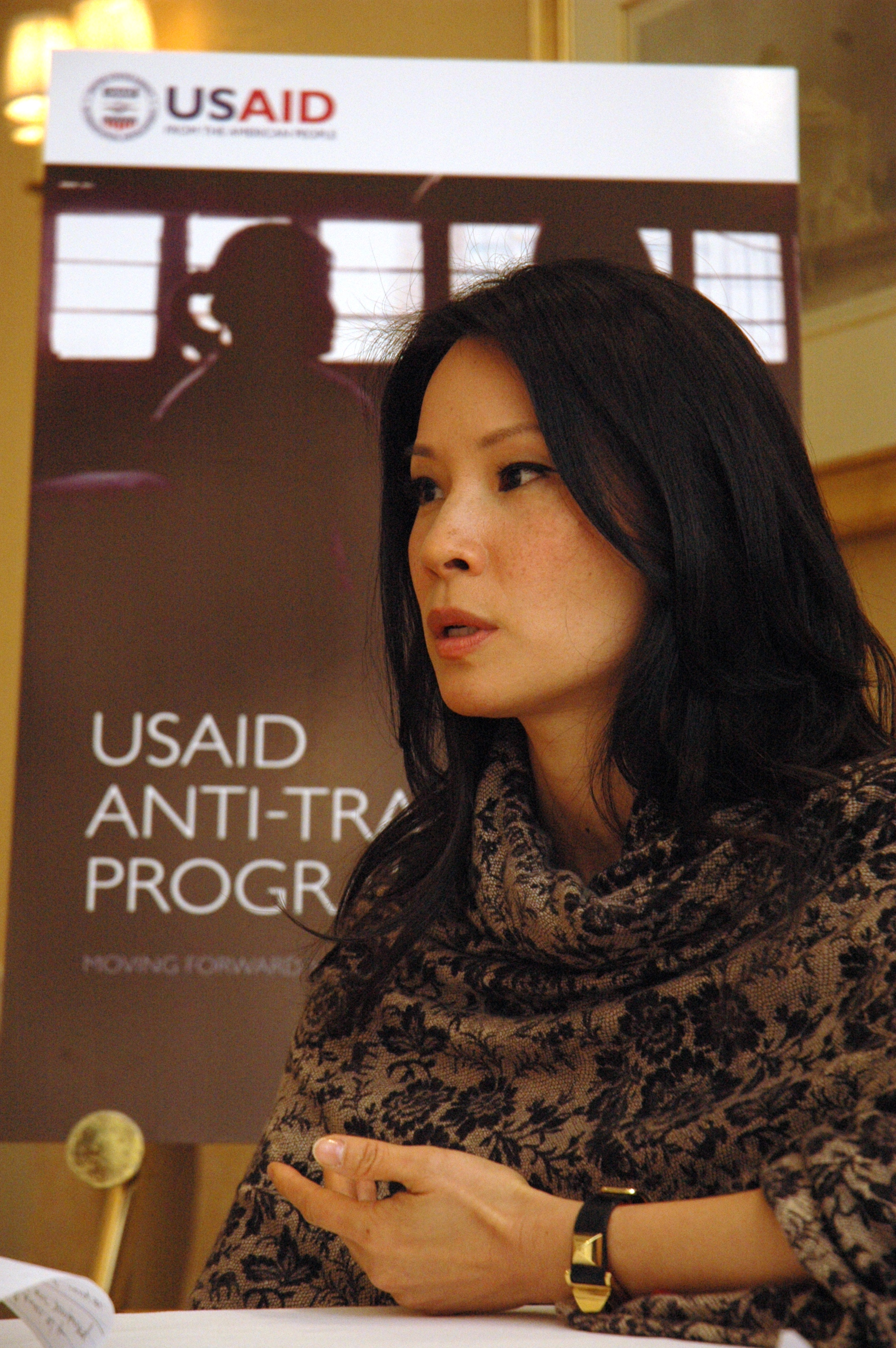
Actress and UNICEF Ambassador Lucy Liu spoke out against human trafficking and lauded USAID efforts to increase awareness

Trafficking of human beings — sometimes called human trafficking or, in the case of sexual services, sex trafficking — is not the same as people smuggling. A smuggler will facilitate illegal entry into a country for a fee, and on arrival at their destination, the smuggled person is free; the trafficking victim is coerced in some way. Victims do not agree to be trafficked; they are tricked, lured by false promises, or forced into it. Traffickers use coercive tactics including deception, fraud, intimidation, isolation, physical threats and use of force, debt bondage or even force-feeding drugs to control their victims.

While the majority of victims are women, and sometimes children, other victims include men, women and children forced or conned into manual or cheap labor. Due to the illegal nature of trafficking, the exact extent is unknown. A U.S. government report published in 2003 estimates that 800,000-900,000 people worldwide are trafficked across borders each year. This figure does not include those who are trafficked internally.

==== Child trafficking ====
According to a study by Alternatives to Combat Child Labour Through Education and Sustainable Services in the Middle East and North Africa Region (ACCESS-MENA) 30% of school children living in border villages of Yemen had been smuggled into Saudi Arabia. Child trafficking is commonly referenced as "transporting". Smuggled children were in danger of being sexually abused or even killed. Poverty is one of the reasons behind child trafficking and some children are smuggled with their parents' consent via a transporter. As many as 50% of those smuggled are children. In the Philippines, between 60,000 and 100,000 children are trafficked to work in the sex industry.

==== Human trafficking and migration ====
Each year, hundreds of thousands of migrants are moved illegally by highly organized international smuggling and trafficking groups, often in dangerous or inhumane conditions. This phenomenon has been growing in recent years as people of low income countries are aspiring to enter developed countries in search of jobs. Migrant smuggling and human trafficking are two separate offences and differ in a few central respects. While "smuggling" refers to facilitating the illegal entry of a person into a State, "trafficking" includes an element of exploitation.

The trafficker retains control over the migrant—through force, fraud or coercion—typically in the sex industry, through forced labour or through other practices similar to slavery. Trafficking violates the idea of basic human rights. The overwhelming majority of those trafficked are women and children. These victims are commodities in a multibillion-dollar global industry. Criminal organizations are choosing to traffic human beings because, unlike other commodities, people can be used repeatedly and because trafficking requires little in terms of capital investment.

Smuggling is also reaping huge financial dividends to criminal groups who charge migrants massive fees for their services. Intelligence reports have noted that drug-traffickers and other criminal organizations are switching to human cargo to obtain greater profit with less risk.

It is acknowledged that the smuggling of people is a growing global phenomenon. It is a transnational crime. Currently, economic instability appears to be the main reason for illegal migration movement throughout the world. Nevertheless, many of the willing migrants undertake the hazardous travel to their destination country with criminal syndicates specialized in people smuggling. These syndicates arrange everything for the migrants, but at a high price.

Very often the traveling conditions are inhumane: the migrants are overcrowded in trucks or boats and fatal accidents occur frequently. After their arrival in the destination country, their illegal status puts them at the mercy of their smugglers, which often force the migrants to work for years in the illegal labor market to pay off the debts incurred as a result of their transportation.

=== Wildlife ===
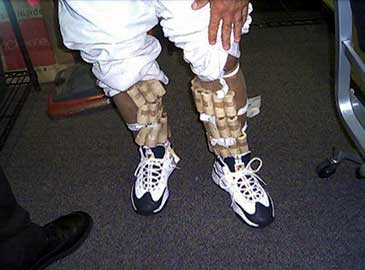
A smuggler of rare birds arrested by the U.S. Customs and Border Protection at a U.S. border

Wildlife smuggling results from the demand for exotic species and the lucrative nature of the trade. The CITES (Convention on International Trade in Endangered Species of Wild Fauna and Flora) regulates the movement of endangered wildlife across political borders.

== Economics of smuggling ==
Research on smuggling as economic phenomenon is scant. Jagdish Bhagwati and Bent Hansen first forwarded a theory of smuggling in which they saw smuggling essentially as an import-substituting economic activity. Their main consideration, however, was the welfare implications of smuggling. Against common belief that the private sector is more efficient than the public sector, they showed that smuggling might not enhance social welfare though it may divert resources from governments to the private sector.

In contrast, Faizul Latif Chowdhury, in 1999, suggested a production-substituting model of smuggling in which price disparity due to cost of supply is critically important as an incentive for smuggling. This price disparity is caused by domestic consumption-taxes and import duties. Drawing attention to the case of cigarettes, Chowdhury suggested that, in Bangladesh, smuggling of cigarettes reduced the level of domestic production. Domestic production of cigarettes is subject to value added tax (VAT) and other consumption tax. Reduction of domestic taxes enables the local producer to supply at a lower cost and bring down the price disparity that encourages smuggling.

However, Chowdhury suggested that there is a limit beyond which reducing domestic taxes on production cannot confer a competitive advantage versus smuggled cigarettes. Therefore, government needs to upscale its anti-smuggling drive so that seizures (taking possession of person or property by legal process) can add to the cost of smuggling and thus render smuggling uncompetitive. Notably, Chowdhury modeled the relationship of the smuggler to the local producer as one of antagonistic duopoly.

On the other hand, research by Tat Chee Tsui in 2016 suggests that even if increasing cigarette duty may encourage smuggling, total cigarette-consumption still declines because the price of illicit goods, as substitutes of taxed cigarettes, also increases because of higher tax rate.

One economic view sees smuggling as monopoly-busting - as a challenge to state-sponsored restrictions or taxes on trade.

== Methods ==
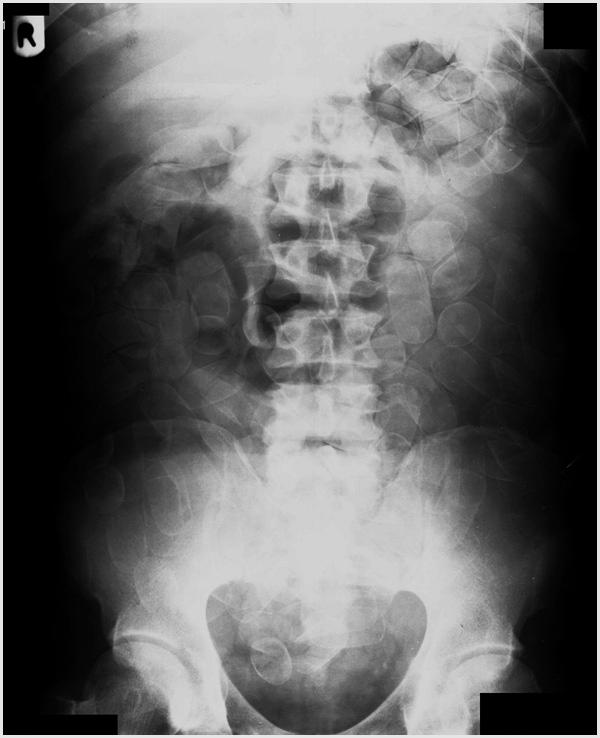
X-ray of an abdomen piled up with cocaine

In smuggling, concealment can involve concealing the smuggled goods on a person's clothing, luggage or inside a body cavity. Some smugglers hide the whole transportation vehicle or ship used to bring the items into an area. Avoiding border checks, such as by small ships, private airplanes, through overland smuggling routes, smuggling tunnels and even small submersibles. This also applies for illegally passing a border oneself, for illegal immigration or illegal emigration. In many parts of the world, particularly the Gulf of Mexico, the smuggling vessel of choice is the go-fast boat.

Submitting to border checks with the goods or people hidden in a vehicle or between (other) merchandise, or the goods hidden in luggage, in or under clothes, inside the body (see body cavity search, balloon swallower and mule), etc. Many smugglers fly on regularly scheduled airlines. A large number of suspected smugglers are caught each year by customs worldwide. Goods and people are also smuggled across seas hidden in containers, and overland hidden in cars, trucks, and trains. A related topic is illegally passing a border oneself as a stowaway. The high level of duty levied on alcohol and tobacco in Britain has led to large-scale smuggling from France to the UK through the Channel Tunnel. The combination of acknowledged corruption at the border and high import tariffs led smugglers in the 1970s and '80s to fly electronic equipment such as stereos and televisions in cargo planes from one country to clandestine landing strips in another, thereby circumventing encounters at the frontier between countries.

For illegally passing a border oneself, another method is with a false passport (completely fake, or illegally changed, or the passport of a lookalike).

At Border checkpoints, especially for shipping cargo, Border agents must inspect cargo for smuggled and illegal goods. However, because of what is called Gridlock a maximum of 5% inspections per cargo holds worldwide. Since it can take a proper and complete inspection four to six hours, major global trade routes such as Singapore offer great opportunity for smugglers and traders alike. As the leading Cape Town Customs Official argues, if a shipping port stops and inspects every ship it would cause a total shipping grid lock, which is trade gridlock, which is also economic gridlock. By under-declaring and misrepresenting, even the most surprising goods is common practice when smuggling. What popular culture does not communicate, is that illegal drugs and arms are not the bane of customs officers and the ultimate threat to their economy. In reality, the most commonly smuggled items are everyday items one believes to be common and thus causes higher losses in tax revenue. An anonymous shipping agent said that smuggling becomes second nature to businessmen, taking finished products and misrepresenting them to offer the cheapest possible rate. What the majority of people do not realize, is that the media and popular culture focus on criminal organizations as primary smugglers, but in reality legitimate businesses are the biggest offenders. By incorporating their label on merchandise or products, it leaves bias towards their goods as the popular media portrays them as reliable. Smuggling, however, is produced through the very culture of the shipping industry and is affected by institutionalized tariffs and taxes around the world.

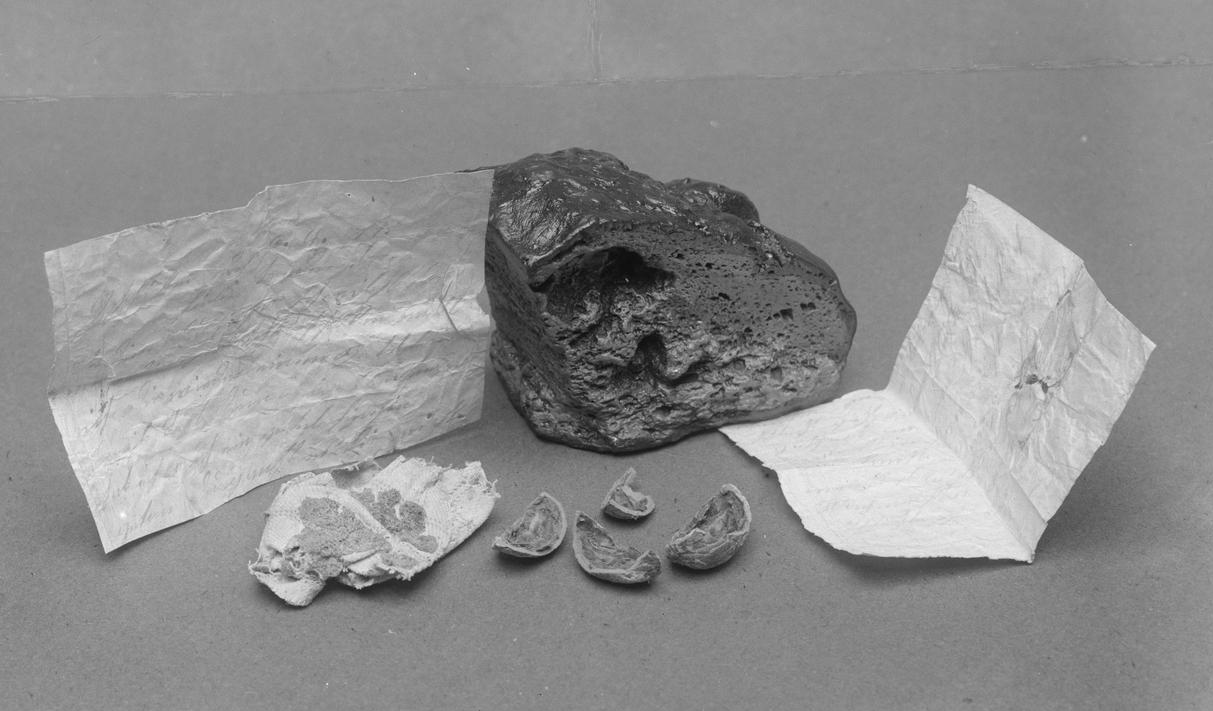
A walnut shell containing a letter, concealed in a loaf of bread, which was sent from Germany to a German prisoner of war in France during World War I

The existence of the Multi-Consignment Contraband (MCC) smuggling method (smuggling two or more different types of contraband such as drugs and illegal immigrants or drugs and guns at the same time) was verified following the completion of a study that found 16 documented cases of smugglers transporting more than one type of contraband in the same shipment. MCC shipments were frequently associated with Phase II and Phase III smuggling organizations.

=== Use of animals ===
In addition to human couriers, smugglers have been known to transport illicit goods with the use of trained animals. One advantage to smugglers using animals is that unlike human couriers, who might turn state's evidence if caught, an animal courier, if caught with any contraband on them, would be unable to provide any verbal information to the authorities.

==== Dogs ====
One way that smugglers have used animals to transport contraband at times is through the use of dogs. Often smugglers have been known to strap drugs onto the backs of canine and then use such dogs as pack animals to transport the contraband across further distances or across borders.

==== Cats ====
Another way smugglers have used to transport contraband on multiple occasions is cats. Usually the cats are used to sneak drugs into prisons, where prison gangs can then sell the drugs to other inmates. Often a smuggler from the outside will attach small amounts of drugs to a cat and then the cat will either be lured inside the prison by inmates with cat treats or the cat might be trained to enter the prison. In addition to drugs, cats have also been used to smuggle other kinds of contraband into prison such as cellphones, tools, batteries and phone chargers. The reason why cats can make good drug couriers is due to the fact that felines are naturally stealthy animals and because the prison guards are often less likely to suspect that contraband might be on a cat.

==== Birds ====
Additionally smugglers have also used homing pigeons to transport contraband by air at times. Carrier pigeons have been used to smuggle drugs into prisons and across borders. Additionally homing pigeons have also been used to transport cellphones and SIM cards into prisons. The reason why pigeons have been useful for smugglers, is that they can fly for long distances and because the birds are usually unlikely to arouse much suspicion from authorities, due to the fact that pigeons are such widespread and commonly witnessed birds, in both rural and urban areas.

==== Livestock ====
Smugglers have also been known to transport contraband with the use of livestock. One such example is the use of horses, donkeys, mules and ponies. The traffickers often strap the illicit goods to the packhorses pack saddle, so that the animal can carry more loads of contraband further and across more rugged terrain than a human courier. In addition to Packhorses, Smugglers have also been known to transport contraband with the use of horse-drawn vehicles. Additionally there are also livestock that smugglers have used as living body couriers, in such instances the animals are either made to swallow the drugs or the drugs are surgically implanted inside the animals before they are herded to another destination, at a later date when the animals are slaughtered for their meat, the drugs are then removed and given to associates. One such example is the use of cattle. Cattle have been used as 'body couriers' to transport contraband in multiple ways, often by inserting the drugs into the cattle, to be removed at a later time after slaughter. Another animal that traffickers have used as body couriers are goats, which they remove drugs from after slaughter. Additionally another animal that has been used by smugglers to transport contraband are sheep. Oftentimes, the traffickers either attach the drugs to the sheep's wool or they insert the drugs inside the sheep to be removed at a later date after slaughter. What type of livestock or pack animals do organized criminals use to carry contraband, often depends on availability and region. For example, in parts of South America, traffickers have used llamas as pack animals to transport drugs across rugged terrain or across borders. In certain parts of Asia, elephants have been used as pack animals to carry large amounts of drugs across wilderness areas or across borders. In Middle Eastern countries, smugglers have also been known to use camels as pack animals to transport drugs across further distances or across borders.

== See also ==
- Arms trafficking
- Battle of Mudeford – 1784 skirmish between smugglers and customs officers
- Carding (fraud) – Crime involving the trafficking of credit card data
- Counterfeiting
- Daigou – Purchases of goods for Chinese consumers made overseas
- French Connection – Infamous 20th-century crime scheme
- Illicit cigarette trade
- Iron law of prohibition – Drug enforcement leads to higher potency
- Pizza Connection Trial – Criminal trial against Mafia members
- Rescates – Term for smuggling in 16th century Spanish Caribbean
- Snakehead (gang) – Chinese human smuggling gang
- The Yogurt Connection – American drug smuggling ring
