= Mule (smuggling) =

Person who smuggles contraband and illegal drugs to another border

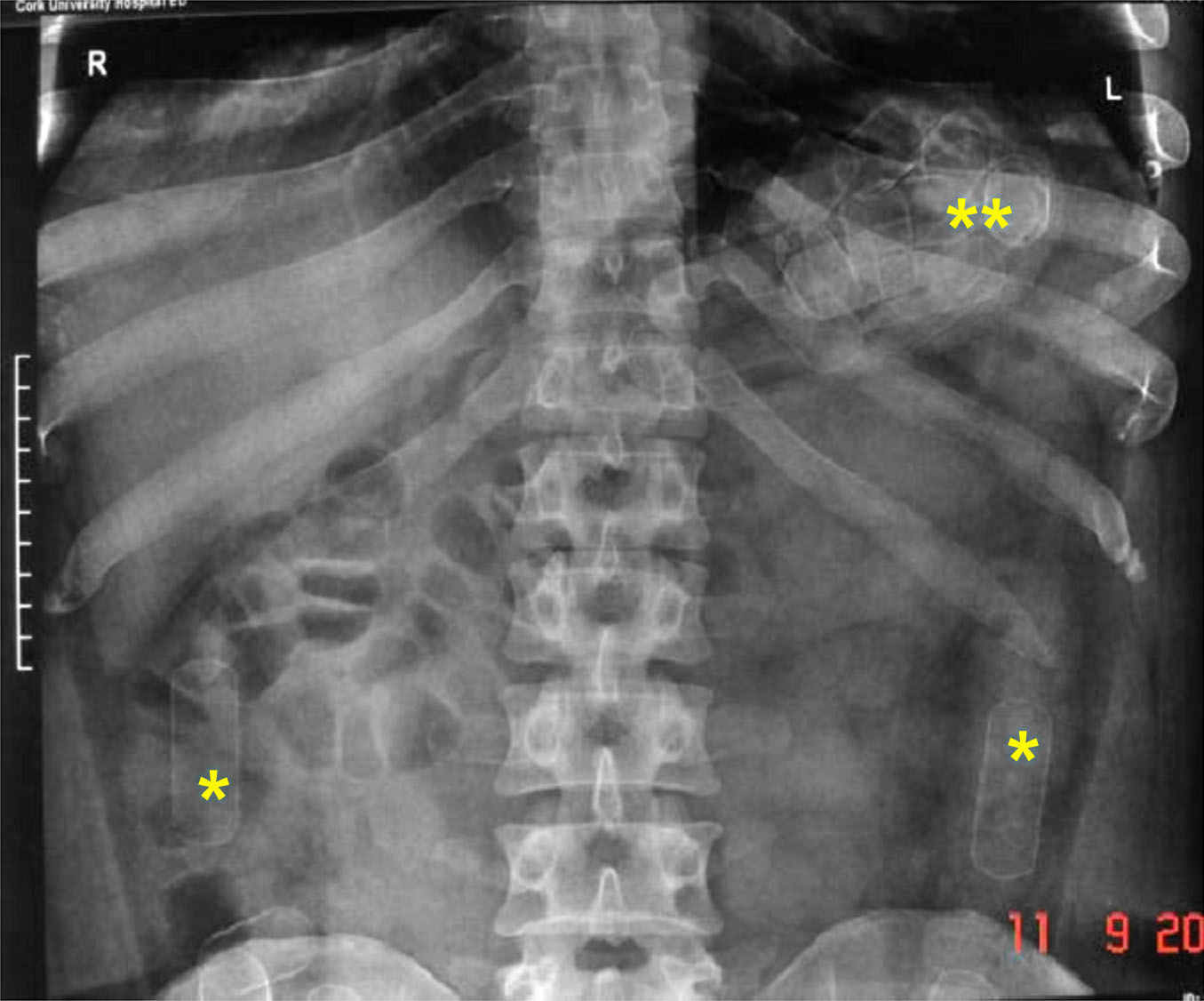
Plain radiograph of the abdomen of a drug "mule" showing swallowed drug capsules

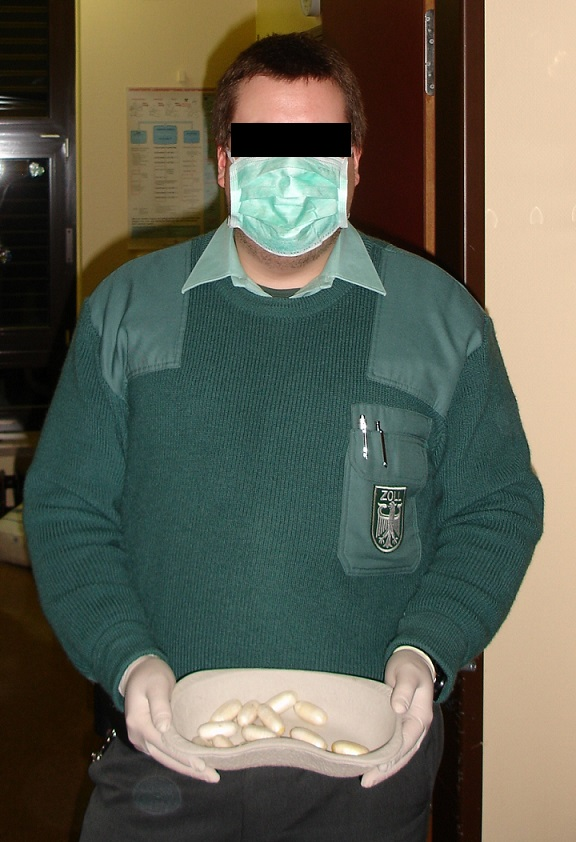
German Customs Officer with seized cocaine containers (bodypacks)

A mule or courier is someone who personally smuggles contraband across a border (as opposed to sending by mail, etc.) for a smuggling organization. The organizers employ mules to reduce the risk of getting caught themselves. Methods of smuggling include hiding the goods in vehicles or carried items, attaching them to one's body, or using the body as a container.

In the case of transporting illegal drugs, the term drug mule applies. Other slang terms include Kinder Surprise and Easter egg. Small-scale operations, in which one courier carries one piece or a very small quantity, are sometimes called the ant trade.

== Recruitment ==
The kind of mules recruited by smugglers can vary by how expensive the product being moved is and how easy it is to replace. Moving more expensive to produce product like heroin or cocaine generally requires at least a little trust and training in the mule, and taking detection seriously. Moving cheap to produce product such as fentanyl can cause smugglers to just grab anyone though - as fentanyl is easy to replace, any one courier getting caught is their problem, and not a huge loss to the smugglers. Cartels have historically been willing to simply threaten people and force them into the life of a drug mule. However, despite cultural depictions of coyotes covertly crossing the desert to escape detection, one of the most common ways of smuggling across the Mexico–United States border in the 21st century has been to recruit American citizens, and have them legally cross the border. These kinds of mules are not forced into the job, but the pay for even a few successful trips is highly tempting for the financially desperate.

== Techniques ==
=== Concealment ===
Methods of smuggling include hiding the goods in a large vehicle, luggage, or clothes. In a vehicle, the contraband is hidden in secret compartments.

Sometimes the goods are hidden in the bag or vehicle of an innocent person, who does not know about the contraband, for the purpose of retrieving the goods elsewhere.

Some contraband is legal to possess but is subject to taxes or other import restrictions, such as second-hand clothes and computers, and the purpose of the smuggling is to get around these restrictions. In this case, smuggling may be done in plain sight, in smaller quantities, so that a suitcase full of used clothes or a new computer can be passed off as a personal possession rather than an importing business.

=== Body packing ===
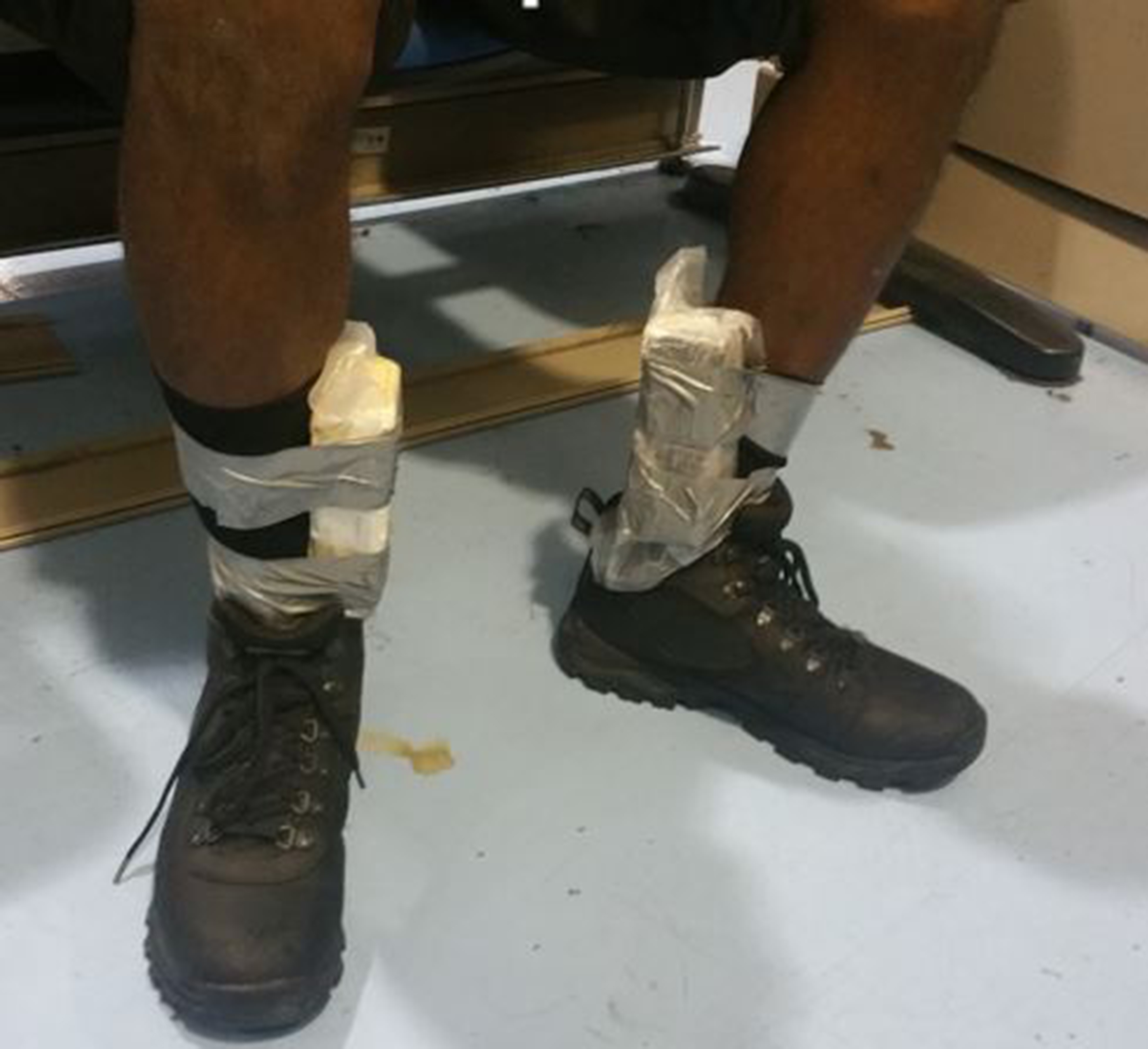
CBP officers arrest man at Port Everglades with cocaine wrapped around ankles

The practice of transporting goods outside or inside of the body is called body packing. This is done by a person usually called a mule or bait. The contraband is attached to the outside of the body using adhesive tape, glue, or straps, often in such places as between the cheeks of the buttocks or between rolls of fat. Other inconspicuous places, like the soles of cut out shoes, inside belts, or the rim of a hat, were used more often prior to the early 1990s. Due to increased airport security the "body packing" method is rarely used anymore.

Some narcotics-trafficking organizations, such as the Mexican cartels, will purposely send one or two people with drugs on the outside of their body to be caught, so that the authorities are preoccupied while dozens of mules pass by undetected with drugs inside their body. However, even these diversionary tactics are becoming less prevalent as airport security increases.

=== Swallowing ===
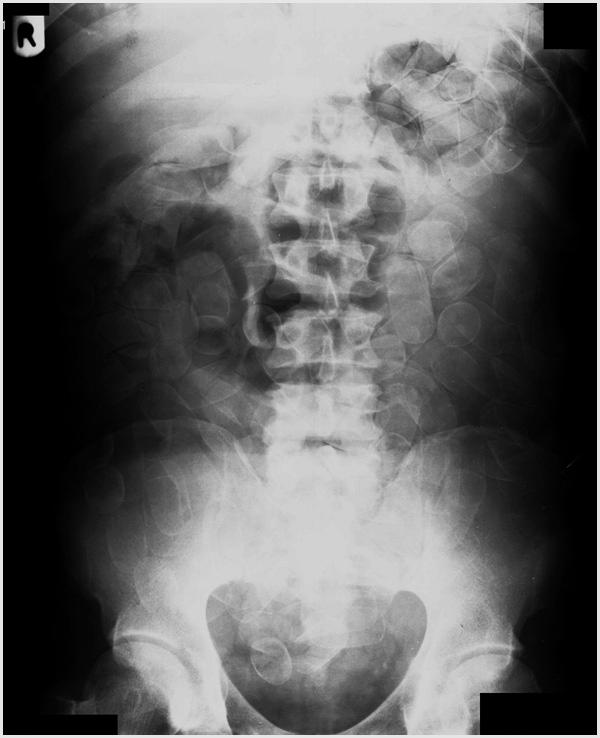
Abdominal X-ray showing swallowed packages of cocaine.

This is often done using a mule's gastrointestinal tract or other body cavities as containers. Swallowing has been used for the transportation of heroin, cocaine, and MDMA (ecstasy). A swallower typically fills tiny balloons with small quantities of a drug. The balloons may be made with multilayered condoms, fingers of latex gloves, or more sophisticated hollow pellets. One smuggling method involves swallowing the balloons, which are recovered later from the excreted feces. Alternatively, the balloons may be hidden in other natural or artificial body cavities – such as rectum, colostomy, vagina, and mouth – although this method is far more vulnerable to body cavity searches. A drug mule may swallow dozens upon dozens of balloons. The swallower then attempts to cross international borders, excrete the balloons, and sell the drugs.

It is most common for the swallower to be making the trip on behalf of a drug lord or drug dealer. Swallowers are often impoverished and agree to transport the drugs in exchange for money or other favors. In fewer cases, the drug dealers can attempt extortion against people by threatening physical harm against friends or family, but the more common practice is for swallowers to willingly accept the job in exchange for big payoffs. As reported in Lost Rights by James Bovard: "Nigerian drug lords have employed an army of 'swallowers', those who will swallow as many as 150 balloons and smuggle drugs into the United States. Given the per capita yearly income of Nigeria is $2,100, Nigerians can collect as much as $15,000 per trip." Swallowers have been apprehended from a variety of age groups, including adults, teens, and children.

== Detection and medical treatment ==
Routine detection of the smuggled packets is extremely difficult, and many cases come to light because a packet has ruptured or because of intestinal obstruction. Unruptured packets may sometimes be detected by rectal or vaginal examination, but the only reliable way is by X-ray of the abdomen. Hashish appears denser than stool, cocaine is approximately the same density as stool, while heroin looks like air.

An increasingly popular type of swallowing involves having the drug in the form of liquid-filled balloons or condoms/packages. These are impossible to detect unless the airport has high-sensitivity X-Ray equipment, as a liquid mixture of water and the drug will most likely not be detected using a standard X-Ray machine. Most of the major airports in Europe, Canada, and the US have the more sensitive machines.

In most cases, it is only necessary to wait for the packets to pass normally, but if a packet ruptures or if there is intestinal obstruction, then it may be necessary to operate and surgically remove the packets. Oil-based laxatives should never be used, as they can weaken the latex of condoms and cause packets to rupture. Emetics like syrup of ipecac, enemas, and endoscopic retrieval all carry a risk of packet rupture and should not be used. Repeat imaging is only necessary if the mule does not know the packet count.

Ruptured packets can be fatal, leading to a drug overdose and may require admission to an ICU. Body packers are not always reliable sources of information about the contents of the packages (either because of fears about information being passed on to law enforcement agencies or because the mule genuinely does not know). Urine toxicology may be necessary to determine what drugs are being carried and what antidotes are needed.

== International incidents ==
=== China ===
Some mobile phones and electronics are available for less in Hong Kong, one of China's Special Administrative Regions where the tax laws are relaxed. Mules employed by smugglers have been found with devices strapped to their bodies in an effort to smuggle them across the border from Hong Kong to Shenzhen. According to Customs Law of China and Smuggling Penalties, a person shall be subject to a criminal charge if found smuggling small quantities of goods three times in one year. The maximum jail sentence is three years.

=== United States ===
The U.S. Supreme Court dealt with body packing in United States v. Montoya De Hernandez. In Hernandez, a woman attempted to smuggle 88 balloons of cocaine in her gastrointestinal tract. She had been detained for over 16 hours by customs inspectors before she finally passed some of the balloons. She was being held because her abdomen was noticeably swollen (she claimed to be pregnant), and a search of her body had revealed that she was wearing two pairs of elastic underpants and had lined her crotch area with paper towels. This is done because balloon swallowing makes bowel movements difficult to control. The woman claimed her Fourth Amendment rights had been violated, but the court found in favor of the border authorities.

With regard to traffic from South America to the US, the US Drug Enforcement Administration reports: "Unlike cocaine, heroin is often smuggled by people who swallow large numbers of small capsules (50–90), allowing them to transport up to 1.5 kilograms of heroin."

=== United Kingdom ===
In 2003, over 50% of foreign female prisoners in UK jails were drug mules from Jamaica. Nigerian women make a large contribution to the remaining figure.

In all, around 18% of the UK's female jail population are foreigners, 60% of whom are serving sentences for drug-related offences – most of them drug mules.

== Russian Federation ==
=== Wholesalers ===
Since the import of drugs into the territory of the Russian Federation practically does not occur, and the production of so-called "bath salts" is localized even in the Far North, therefore, drug transportation is almost always within the country. Wholesalers carrying approximately 1 to 10 kg drive cars, loading their prohibited goods into places not intended for cargo transportation, for example, in the hood or under the body.

=== Local drug runners ===
The retail sale of drugs in Russia usually takes place through the darknet. The purchase is paid for in cryptocurrency, then the courier tells the buyer the geolocation of the drug drop, after which the recipient comes and picks it up. Local drug couriers in Russia usually come from the poorest part of the indigenous population of the Russian Federation or foreign citizens of Central Asian states.

Today, the salary of such runners reaches one million rubles per month, which is approximately 10 times the average salary in the Russian Federation. However, their criminal work often lasts less than a month, after which they are arrested under Article 228 of the Russian Criminal Code, which carries a prison sentence of 10 to 20 years. On average, 20,000 to 50,000 such couriers are arrested in Russia each year.

== See also ==
- Illegal drug trade in Colombia
- Leo Sharp – described as "the oldest drug courier in the world", served the Sinaloa cartel.
- Money mule
- U.S. Immigration and Customs Enforcement
- United States Border Patrol
- War on drugs
