= Rough ride (police brutality) =

Form of police brutality

A rough ride is a form of police brutality in which a handcuffed prisoner is placed in a police van or other patrol vehicle without a seatbelt, and is thrown violently about as the vehicle is driven erratically. Rough rides have been implicated in a number of injuries sustained in police custody, and commentators have speculated that the practice contributed to the death of Freddie Gray in Baltimore, Maryland, in April 2015. Throughout the U.S., police have been accused of using aggressive driving tactics to "rough suspects up", resulting in numerous injuries, and millions of dollars of damages awarded to victims and their families.

Baltimore lawyer Phil Federico described the practice as "definitely intentional", saying "they're unbelted, the inside of these wagons are not padded, they can't protect themselves, and they get thrown from one side to the other, usually landing on their head, and fracturing their neck." The practice has been described as torture by Philadelphia-based activist and academic Marc Lamont Hill. University of South Carolina professor Geoffrey Alpert, an expert in police use of force, has asserted that the practice was common in the 1980s and 1990s, but has become less so with the increased presence of video recording equipment in police vehicles. There are no reliable records of the frequency of these incidents.

Other terms for the practice include "nickel ride" (a reference to carnival rides), "cowboy ride", "joyride", "bringing them up front" (referring to sudden braking), and "screen test" (as the prisoner may hit the protective screen behind the driver).

== Alleged incidents ==
=== Baltimore ===
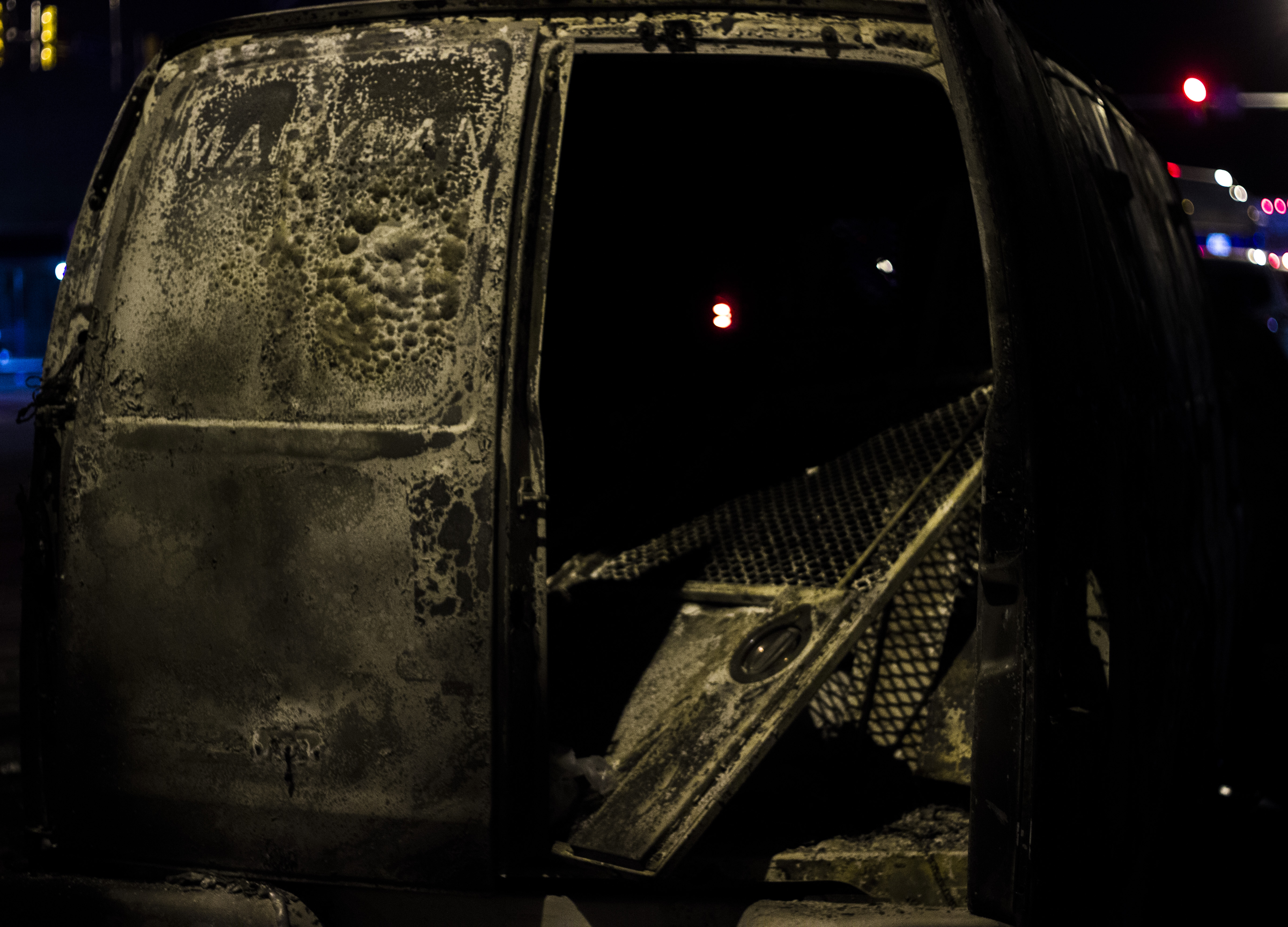
A Baltimore Police Department van, similar to the one which carried Freddie Gray, burnt during the subsequent 2015 Baltimore protests

In 1980, 58-year-old John Wheatfall broke his neck and became paralyzed during a ride to Baltimore's Southwestern District. Wheatfall was seated on a bench with his hands cuffed behind his back, when he was thrown to the floor and hit his head against the wall. Baltimore police vans did not have seatbelts at the time. The officer driving stated he had swerved to avoid an oncoming car, and an investigation did not find evidence of negligence. Wheatfall sued for $3 million, and was awarded $20,000 for his injury.

In 2004, Jeffrey Alston was awarded $39 million after becoming paralyzed from the neck down as a result of a ride in a Baltimore police van.

In 2005, Dondi Johnson Sr., a plumber, was arrested in Baltimore for public urination. Apparently uninjured at the time of his arrest, Johnson emerged from the police van paralyzed with a broken neck, and died two weeks later from pneumonia resulting from his injuries. Johnson stated he had been thrown face-first into the interior of the van during a sharp turn. His family sued the Baltimore police and were awarded $7.4 million, which was reduced to $219,000 under a cap imposed by Maryland state law.

In 2012, Christine Abbott, a 27-year-old assistant librarian at Johns Hopkins University, was arrested at a party she was hosting at her home in Baltimore's Hampden neighborhood. She was handcuffed and put into a police van. Abbott later sued the officers in federal court, describing her ride as "like a roller coaster", and accusing the officers of braking short and taking "wide, fast turns" which slammed her into the walls. Police acknowledged that Abbott was not buckled in during her ride.

Some media commentators have suggested that the "rough ride" practice was a factor in the 2015 death of Freddie Gray, although state prosecutors have not alleged that Gray was subjected to a rough ride. Gray was arrested on April 12, and was conscious and able to speak before being placed into a police van. Following a thirty-minute ride, Gray was comatose and not breathing. He was treated at the R Adams Cowley Shock Trauma Center of the University of Maryland Hospital, where his spinal cord was found to be 80% severed, an injury consistent with a serious car accident. Gray died a week after his arrest. Medical experts say Gray may have sustained a neck injury during his arrest which could have been exacerbated during his transport. Police acknowledged that Gray was not buckled in, contrary to departmental policy. On September 9, 2015, the City of Baltimore approved a $6.4 million civil settlement with Gray's family. The first criminal case to be tried of the police officers involved with Gray's arrest resulted in a mistrial.

=== Los Angeles ===
On April 15, 1990, Fernando Martinez was arrested by the Los Angeles County Sheriff's Department. In a 1991 class-action lawsuit filed by the NAACP Legal Defense and Educational Fund, it was alleged that a deputy drove recklessly while Martinez, then a minor, was handcuffed in the back seat of a patrol car, causing his head to strike the partition separating the front and back seats, and that Martinez was further beaten, choked, and kicked upon arriving at the police station. The case proceeded to trial, resulting in a $6 million award to the 54 plaintiffs, and a $1.5 million allocation for use of force training of the Sheriff's Department.

Following a traffic stop on October 19, 1997, a Los Angeles Police Department disciplinary panel concluded that officer Ray Logan had carried out a "screen test", among other abuses. Logan was subsequently fired.

=== Philadelphia ===
A 2001 investigation by The Philadelphia Inquirer documented twenty people injured in rough rides in Philadelphia. Three suffered spinal injuries, and two were paralyzed. As of 2001, courts had awarded $2.3 million in legal settlements resulting from these cases, but no officer had ever been disciplined for the practice. The Philadelphia Police Department began to introduce vans with padding and safety restraints in December 2000.

On April 10, 1994, Gino Thompson was thrown from his seat when the police van carrying him stopped suddenly. Thompson sustained a spinal cord injury which paralyzed him from the waist down. Thompson was awarded $600,000.

On March 31, 1995, John DeVivo was arrested, handcuffed, and placed in a police van. DeVivo reported that the driver slammed on the brakes, throwing him to the floor and fracturing his tailbone. The police claimed that a dog had run into the road, and denied wrongdoing. DeVivo sued and was awarded $11,000.

On September 29, 1996, Bernadette Moore, age 34, sustained injuries to her shoulder and back after a police ride in which she reported that the driver was "swerving and slamming on the brakes". She was later awarded $15,000.

In 1997, Calvin Saunders was thrown from his seat and slammed his head against the wall of a police van. He became paralyzed from the neck down, and was awarded $1.2 million.

On April 15, 1998, Robert Schwartz Sr., age 44, broke a vertebra in his neck during what he described as a wild police wagon ride. He was awarded $110,000.

On February 21, 1999, Carlice Harris, age 44, sustained injuries to her face, knees, and wrists during police transport. She was awarded $22,500.

In 2011, James McKenna was arrested outside a Philadelphia bar. McKenna alleged that he heard an officer tell the driver of the van to "fuck him up." During a 20-minute ride including quick stops and sharp turns, he repeatedly slammed his head into the walls, ultimately breaking three vertebrae in his neck. McKenna was awarded $490,000.

=== Other incidents ===
In 1980, Chicago plumber Freddie Franklin alleged in a federal lawsuit that he was wrongfully arrested by six members of the Chicago Police Department and forced into the back of a police van in handcuffs. The van was allegedly driven recklessly, throwing Franklin around the van and causing him to bite off his lower lip. Franklin received $135,000 from the city in a settlement of the lawsuit.

In 1999, a former police chaplain in Aurora, Illinois, sued that city's police department, alleging that it was a common practice for police in Aurora to drive recklessly so as to attempt to injure handcuffed suspects. The department denied the allegations and the lawsuit was eventually settled.

In November 2017, Andreu Van den Eynde, a lawyer for several ministers of the Republican Left of Catalonia sentenced to prison in Spain, questioned how his clients "were contained mechanically" during transport from the Audiencia Nacional to a prison in Estremera, 100 kilometres (62 mi) away. Spain's Ministry of the Interior did not confirm whether the prisoners were cuffed in the vans or not. Van den Eynde did not immediately file a complaint of mistreatment, pending medical reports.

In November 2022, five members of the New Haven Police Department were charged with second-degree reckless endangerment and cruelty, after neglecting the injuries of a black suspect injured in their custody. In the June 2022 incident, the driver of a police van braked hard, allegedly to avoid a collision, causing Randy Cox, 36, to hit the metal partition headfirst, resulting in his paralysis. After being placed in a detention center, Cox's pleas for help were met with mockery, captured on surveillance and body-worn cameras. The five officers charged are next due in court on December 8. The city agreed with him on a payment of $45 million.

== See also ==
- Law enforcement techniques and procedures
- Saskatoon freezing deaths
- Gypsy cop
