= Rescates =

Term for smuggling in 16th century Spanish Caribbean

Rescates was a term for the smuggling trade in the sixteenth-century Spanish Caribbean. The word is derived from the Spanish verb rescatar, meaning 'to ransom' or 'to rescue'.

One of the earliest records that cited this phenomenon was a document written in November 1598 by Baltzar de Castro, a royal standard-bearer of the city of Santo Domingo, which described a plan to address the rescates menace in Hispaniola. He stated that "from the port of Santo Domingo alone, more than a million [ducat's worth] of sugar, ginger, and other products... not counting the gold, silver, and pearls" were traded and contributed to the royal coffers. However, such prosperous state of affairs collapsed due to the rescates and that "all the vecinos, the church, the monasteries, and the hospitals, were so poor and were invaded and robbed."

An account claimed that the smuggling activities was ambiguous since the contraband trading relationship involved willing participation on the local side while, in some, it was coerced. For instance, some local functionaries called alcalde ordinarios sent to investigate rescate ports were also involved in the trade as well.
