= Don't touch my junk =

Phrase

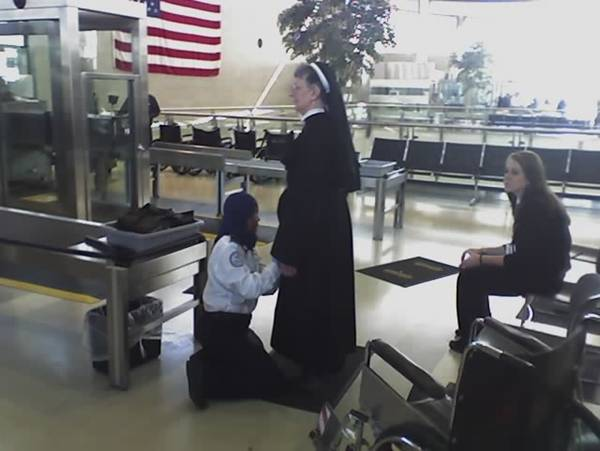
A nun is frisked by a Transportation Security Administration officer at Detroit Metro Airport.

"Don't touch my junk" is a phrase that became popular in the United States in 2010 as a criticism of Transportation Security Administration (TSA) patdowns. The word "junk" is American English slang for a man's genitals. The phrase refers to the offense many people took to the November 2010 decision by TSA to begin full body patdowns of airline passengers in the U.S. who refused to go through a full body scanner.

== Origin of the phrase ==
The phrase was inadvertently coined in 2010 by passenger John Tyner, an Oceanside, California computer programmer who released an audio recording from San Diego International Airport in which he told TSA agents: "If you touch my junk, I'm going to have you arrested." Tyner had initially chosen to undergo a pat-down rather than going through a full-body scan machine, citing health concerns and a view that the machines were a threat to privacy. The TSA refused to allow him to pass without this search and so he declined to travel and got a refund on his ticket. An official then demanded that he submit to a search regardless. He declined and was threatened with prosecution, as well as a fine of $10,000.

In response to being asked by a reporter if he thought he looked like a terrorist, Tyner said “No, I'm a 6-foot-1 [1.85 m], white man". He subsequently uploaded a video onto YouTube based on his experience, which went viral and received 70,000 views by the end of the same day. Most of the comments posted on the video were supportive of Tyner.

== Support and criticism ==
Conservative columnist Charles Krauthammer subsequently wrote an editorial in which he expressed support for Tyner and described "Don't Touch My Junk" as the "anthem of the modern man, the Tea Party patriot, the late-life libertarian, the midterm election voter" and even compared it to the American patriotic phrase Don't Tread on Me. At least two "Don't Touch My Junk" songs have since been released, one of which was written by Houston, Texas, musician Danny Kristensen and was based on a James Cotton song, "Cut You Loose".

Michael Kinsley weighed in on Politico in a column entitled "Go ahead, touch my junk", in which he defended the TSA against criticism from Tyner and others. Wendy Kaminer, a left-wing contributor to The Atlantic, argued that the intentions of those, such as Krauthammer, who were criticizing the indiscriminate screening of passengers were actually promoting racial profiling. Kaminer described Krauthammer's suggestion that screening should be conducted on the "profile of the airline attacker [which] is... universally known," as more aptly summed up as "Don't Touch My Junk, Touch His".

On his radio show, Rush Limbaugh offered a slightly different formulation of the slogan: "Keep your hands off my tea bag, Mr. President", alluding to the recent use of the phrase "tea bag" in reference to the Tea Party Movement. In another variation, news anchor Brian Williams said on the Late Show with David Letterman, "I always get it at [Los Angeles International Airport]. I get nailed. They go, they go right in. This new thing, they go right after Dave and the twins."

"Don't touch my junk" was parodied, to the tune of Parliament's "Give Up the Funk (Tear the Roof off the Sucker)", at the 2011 Gridiron Club dinner, with President Obama in attendance. Also in March 2011, two New Hampshire state representatives introduced proposed legislation, colloquially called the "don't touch my junk bill", that would criminalize as sexual assault invasive TSA patdowns made without probable cause.

== See also ==
- Airport security
- Strip search
- Body cavity search
