= Undress code =

Limit on how much clothing should be worn

An undress code is a social norm which sets an upper limit on the amount of clothing that can or should be worn.

Promoters of the entertainment industry, including sport, attempt to "sex-up" the entertainment by under-dressing the entertainers or sportspeople. For example, in 1999, the beach volleyball regulatory body, the International Volleyball Federation, set a limit on the amount of clothing allowed for the athletes to wear during competition. The women's uniform comprises a bikini with a width limit on the bottoms of 2.5 inches (6.4 cm) on the sides, which has led to some controversy, and in 2012 these limits were relaxed. In July 2021, a beach handball team was fined because its women members wore shorts instead of bikini bottoms in a match, which requires no more than 10cm of their behind to be covered. Similarly, organisers of some swimsuit competitions set a low maximum threshold for swimwear for contestants.

Some restaurants, sometimes called breastaurants, require female waiting staff to be skimpily-dressed.

The social norm in some countries is to wear considerably less or briefer clothing than in others. Fashions since the mid-20th century has been towards briefer, more form-fitting styles, as well as thinner and sheer materials. In some cultures, including some in Africa, Latin America and South-East Asia/Oceania, traditional dress consists of less clothing than those of the West. Some religious traditions or rituals require the members to be nude, as was the case with the ancient Indian gymnosophists or the Christian sect of the Adamites (the custom is still practised by ascetics of certain Indian religions, such as Hinduism or Jainism). (See also Christian naturism.)

Laws in many countries require a person to undress in some circumstances when requested by a customs or police officer in a strip search.

== See also ==
- Western dress codes
