= Strip search =

Searching a person with clothing removed

"The Correct Procedure for a Visual Search" – A 1990 video produced by the Federal Bureau of Prisons

A strip search is a practice of searching a person for weapons or other contraband suspected of being hidden on their body or inside their clothing, and not found by performing a frisk search, but by requiring the person to remove some or all clothing. The search may involve an official performing an intimate person search and inspecting their personal effects and body cavities (mouth, vagina, rectum, etc.). A strip search is more intrusive than a frisk and requires legal authority. Regulations covering strip searches vary considerably and may be mandatory in some situations or discretionary in others.

A strip search of a suspect of a recent violent crime may additionally be useful for finding blood of the victim, signs of a fight, etc.

== Legality of strip searches ==
In North America, civil lawsuits, as well as criminal code charges against strip searches have usually been successful when a person is strip searched by someone of the opposite sex, especially in cases where a woman has been strip searched by a male guard or guards. The more disputed legal cases have often involved the presence of people of the other gender during a strip search. Some of these cases have been less successful because of the legal technicality of who was actually performing the strip search, i.e. if more than one guard is present, the search is often (legally) said to be performed by the person or people giving the orders or instructions to the person or people being searched.

Another legal issue is that of blanket strip searches, such as in jails where detainees are routinely strip searched prior to conviction of a crime. Courts have often held that blanket strip searches are acceptable only for convicted persons. For detainees pending trial, there must be a reasonable suspicion that the detainee is in possession of weapons or other contraband before a strip search can be conducted. The same often holds true for other situations such as airport security personnel and customs officers, but the dispute often hinges on what constitutes reasonable suspicion.

=== Incidental strip searches ===
In order to bypass the legal reasonable suspicion requirement, and because strip searches can be humiliating, the search is often made less overt, as part of an intake process, that includes a mandatory shower. For example, most prisons also include a mandatory shower along with a change of clothes. The shower serves to make the strip search less blatant as well as providing the additional benefit of removing contamination (in addition to removing weapons or other contraband). Many shelters require new arrivals to hand over all their clothing for a wash, as well as requiring them to have a shower. These rules also enable a discreet check for weapons or other contraband, with less legal implications, being less objectionable because the requirement is applied to everyone entering a facility. It is less offensive to clients than requiring them to undergo an overt strip search.

Security procedures at facilities that mine and process gold, silver, copper, and other high-value minerals may constitute an incidental strip search. At the end of the workday, miners must remove all work clothes before entering a shower facility and then exit nude through a metal detector to a separate changing room where street clothes are stored.

The courts have often held that requiring a person to have a shower as a condition of entry into a space (such as a prison, shelter, or the like) does not, in itself, constitute a strip search, even if the shower and surrounding space are so constructed as to afford visibility of the unclothed body by guards during the showering process.

Hospitals often also have a mandatory shower, during lockdown, when mass decontamination is called for. Paul Rega, M.D., FACEP has specifically identified mass decontamination as providing the added benefit of checking for weapons or other contraband, as well as searching for clues among the clothes of persons found at a terrorist attack crime scene where it is recognized that the perpetrator(s) could be among the persons detained for decontamination.

== Procedure of strip searches ==
Partial strip searches are common at airports, for airport security, which often consists of:

- removal of shoes (and sometimes socks)
- removal of coat and jacket
- removal of belt;
- untucking of shirt.

If there is reason to suspect hidden objects, the person is then taken to a private room, which may consist of:

- removal of shirt
- removal of trousers
- removal of underwear and bra

== Electronic strip searches ==
Backscatter X-ray machines, Millimeter wave scanners, T-ray scans, and other modern technology provide the ability to see through clothing, to achieve a similar result to an actual strip search.

== Notable incidents ==
=== Australia ===
==== New South Wales ====
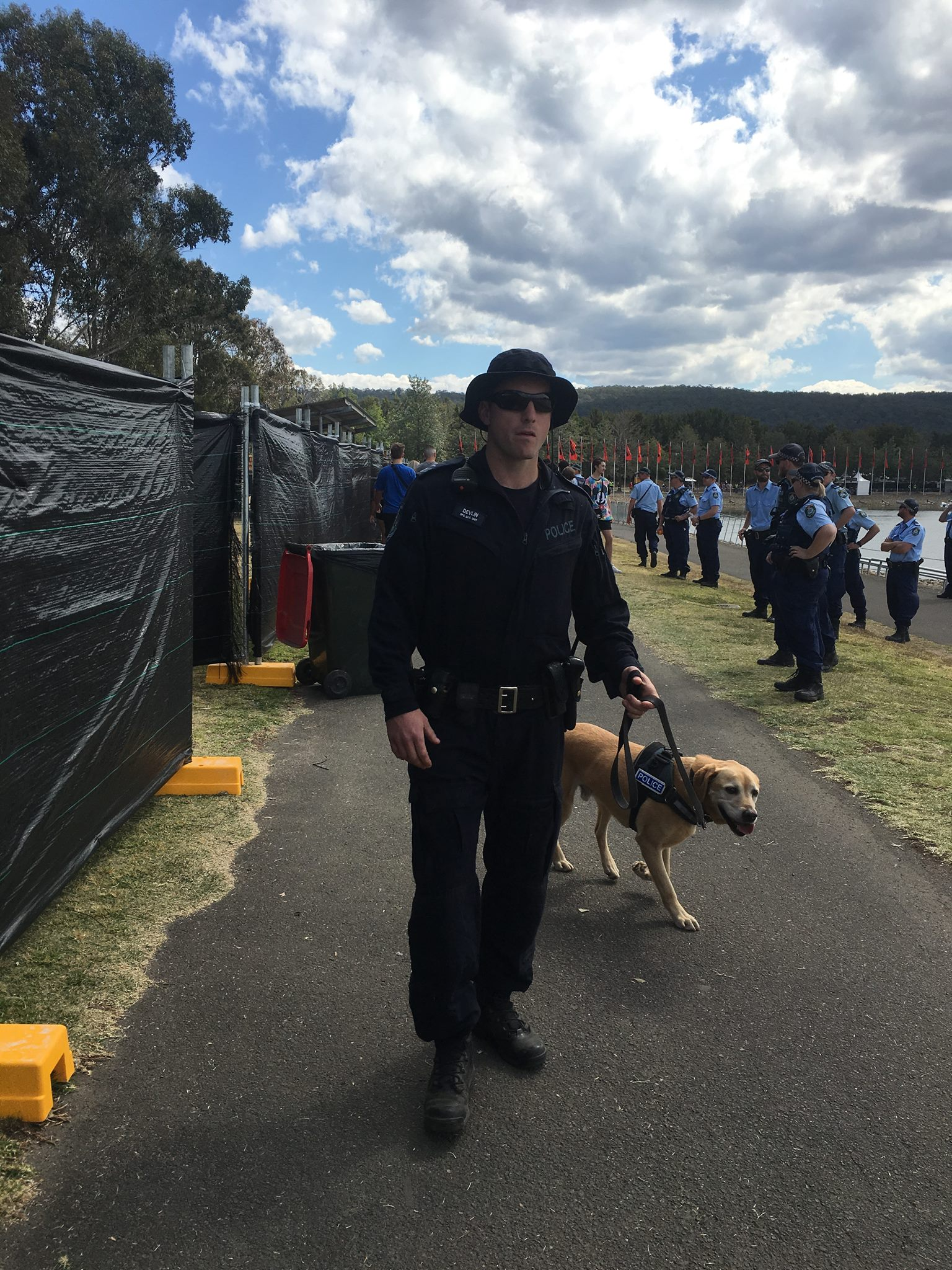
Police and a drug detection dog at the entrance of the Defqon music festival in Sydney in 2017

Following the introduction of a controversial law in 2001, New South Wales Police were given the power to deploy drug detection dogs at major public events such as music festivals, inside licensed premises (venues that serve alcohol) and at stations across the Sydney Trains network.

In late 2014, reports were first published alleging that NSW Police were routinely using drug detection dog indications as a justification for conducting invasive strip searches, particularly at major events such as music festivals. At these events, officers have employed the use of structures such as ticket booths, tents, makeshift partitions and police vans to strip search attendees. In some cases, it was alleged that these structures did not offer adequate privacy to individuals being searched, leaving them exposed to other festivalgoers or officers outside. After stripping partially or completely naked, festival patrons have been asked to do things such as lift their breasts or genitals, bend over, spread their buttocks apart or squat and cough. Similar searches have reportedly been conducted during drug detection dog operations at train stations and licensed venues as well.

In October 2018, the Law Enforcement Conduct Commission launched a formal investigation into the use of strip searches by NSW Police. In a final report handed down in December 2020, the Commission found that "a recurrent issue throughout the inquiry was the failure of officers to comply with, or at least to properly account for their compliance with, the legal thresholds for conducting a strip search". In several cases investigated by the Commission, it was found that officers had acted unlawfully. The commission also noted that there had been a "significant increase" in the "number and proportion" of strip searches carried out following drug detection dog indications in the five years between 2014 and 2019.

In July 2022, a class action was filed in the Supreme Court of New South Wales on behalf of patrons strip searched at music festivals by NSW Police from July 2016 onwards. Head plaintiff for the class action is a then 27-year-old woman who was allegedly strip searched at the Splendour in the Grass music festival in 2018. A trial for the class action is expected to be held in mid-2025.

==== Victoria ====
In the early hours of 7 August 1994, approximately 40 officers from Victoria Police took part in a raid at the Tasty nightclub in Melbourne, a popular venue for LGBT partygoers. Over the course of seven hours, all 463 staff and patrons inside the venue were detained and strip searched, supposedly under the auspices of finding illicit drugs. A class action subsequently launched against Victoria Police was finalised in 1996, with more than 200 patrons who were present at time each being awarded $10,000 in damages. In 2014, Victoria Police formally apologised for the Tasty nightclub raid.

=== Canada ===
As part of policing operations for the 2010 G20 Summit in Toronto, a makeshift detention centre was set up by Toronto Police at a disused film studio on Eastern Avenue. Over the course of the event, approximately 900 protestors were detained at the facility, where they were subjected poor conditions and mistreatment by police.

While being held at the Eastern Avenue detention centre, some protesters were strip searched, with officers using cubicles described as “large plywood cells without roofs” to conduct these searches. In 2014, footage obtained by Vice showed that CCTV cameras could see into these cubicles, leading to fears that protestors detained at the facility were filmed while strip searches were taking place. When asked by Vice, Toronto Police did not respond to questions about the matter and it’s not clear if any such footage exists. In August 2020, the Toronto Police Services Board agreed to pay $16.5 million dollars to settle a class action lawsuit brought on behalf of around 1100 people who were arrested during the 2010 G20 protests, including some who were detained at the Eastern Avenue detention centre.

=== United Kingdom ===
In 2014, it was reported that more than 4,600 children had been strip-searched by the Metropolitan Police in the preceding five years, with the youngest being ten years old. This was out of a total of 134,000 strip-searched. A charity described the number of younger children searched in this way as being "disturbing". In 2022, it was reported that 650 children (between 10 and 17 years old) had been strip-searched by the same agency between 2018 and 2020. 58% of these children were described as black by the arresting officer; in 2018, this rose to 75%. 70% of children who were strip-searched without an appropriate adult present – contrary to official Metropolitan Police guidance – were black boys.

In January 2022, the Metropolitan Police formally apologised to Dr Koshka Duff, an academic who was strip searched at Stoke Newington police station in 2013. The woman had been arrested for obstruction after attempting to offer a legal advice card to a black teenager during a stop and search in London. Once in custody, a Sergeant ordered two female officers to strip search the woman. Her clothes were cut off and she claimed that once she was naked the officers touched her breasts and between her legs. She described the search as a "very violating and humiliating experience" and said she was left with multiple injuries and PTSD after the incident. The woman was charged with obstructing and assaulting police but was later acquitted. In 2018, the officer who ordered the strip search of Dr Duff was cleared of gross misconduct charges. In November 2021, a civil claim brought against the Metropolitan Police was settled, with Dr Duff being awarded £6,000 in damages. In January 2022, CCTV footage of the incident was made public. In the footage, the Sergeant who ordered the search can be heard telling officers to "treat her like a terrorist", while others can be heard making derogatory comments about the woman's underwear and pubic hair. After the footage was released, a Metropolitan Police spokesperson apologised for the "sexist, derogatory and unacceptable language used" by the officers involved.

In March 2022, it was reported that Metropolitan Police officers had strip searched a 15-year-old black girl at her school in Hackney in 2020 after she was wrongly accused of possessing cannabis. The 15-year-old, referred to as "Child Q", was menstruating at the time and was searched without her parents present. Shortly after the story was made public, a protest involving several hundred people was held outside Stoke Newington police station, amid concerns that the girl had been targeted because of her race. In September 2023, the Independent Officer for Police Conduct (IOPC) recommended disciplinary action against four of the officers involved in the incident.

In 2023, Sky News launched an investigation into the use of strip searches by Greater Manchester Police. In a story published in July, three women alleged that they had been subjected to unjustified strip searches while in police custody. In one instance, a 38-year-old woman claimed that she was drugged and raped by officers after being arrested in 2021. After the story was published, several other women contacted Sky News alleging that they had been subjected to similar searches by Greater Manchester Police and other police forces across the UK. In response to the story, Greater Manchester Mayor Andy Burnham announced that former Victims Commissioner Vera Baird would conduct a formal inquiry into the treatment of women in police custody by Greater Manchester Police, with a focus on strip searches. A final report is due to be published in late 2024.

== Notable lawsuits ==
The Supreme Court of Canada ruled in R v Golden (2001) that "strip-searches may only be done out of clear necessity with the permission of a supervisor and by members of the same sex."

In Florence v. Board of Chosen Freeholders (2012), the United States Supreme Court ruled that strip-searches are permitted for all arrests, including non-indictable, minor offenses.

The Beard v. Whitmore Lake School District (2005) case arose in Michigan when a student reported that $364 had been stolen from her gym bag during a physical education class. In response to the alleged theft, teachers searched the entire class of 20 boys and five girls in their respective locker rooms. Boys were required to undress down to their underwear. Similarly, girls were required to do so as well in front of each other. The alleged theft was reported to the local police who sent an officer who arrived midway through the search. Based on court records, the officer encouraged school personnel to continue the search. At the conclusion of the search, no money was found. A suit was filed by the American Civil Liberties Union of Michigan on behalf of students impacted by the search claiming Fourth Amendment rights violations against unreasonable search and seizure and the Fourteenth Amendment rights violation involving an equal protection violation. The case was ultimately ruled on by the Sixth Circuit Court of Appeals. The Sixth Circuit Court focused on several factors that made the strip search unreasonable. One, recovery of money was the primary basis for conducting the search, which did not, in the court's opinion, pose a health or safety threat. Secondly, the search did not involve one or two students but rather a large number of students who did not consent to the search. While the search was held to be unreasonable, the court stopped short of ruling that it was entirely unconstitutional based on prior law involving strip searches of students. Thirdly, school personnel had no reason to suspect any of the students individually. The court emphasized that school leaders have a real interest in maintaining an atmosphere free of theft but a search undertaken to find money serves a less weighty governmental interest than a search undertaken for items that pose a threat to the health and safety of students. Based on the court's position, clearly a search to recover money will not meet the court's expectation regarding the standards associated with a strip search.^{1}

In Safford Unified School District v. Redding (2009), the Supreme Court held that it was unconstitutional for school employees to strip search minor students, in this case students in the Safford, Arizona Unified School District.

== See also ==
- Don't touch my junk
- New South Wales Police Force strip search scandal
- Strip search phone call scam
- Undress code
