= Frisking =

Act of searching a person's outer clothing to detect concealed objects

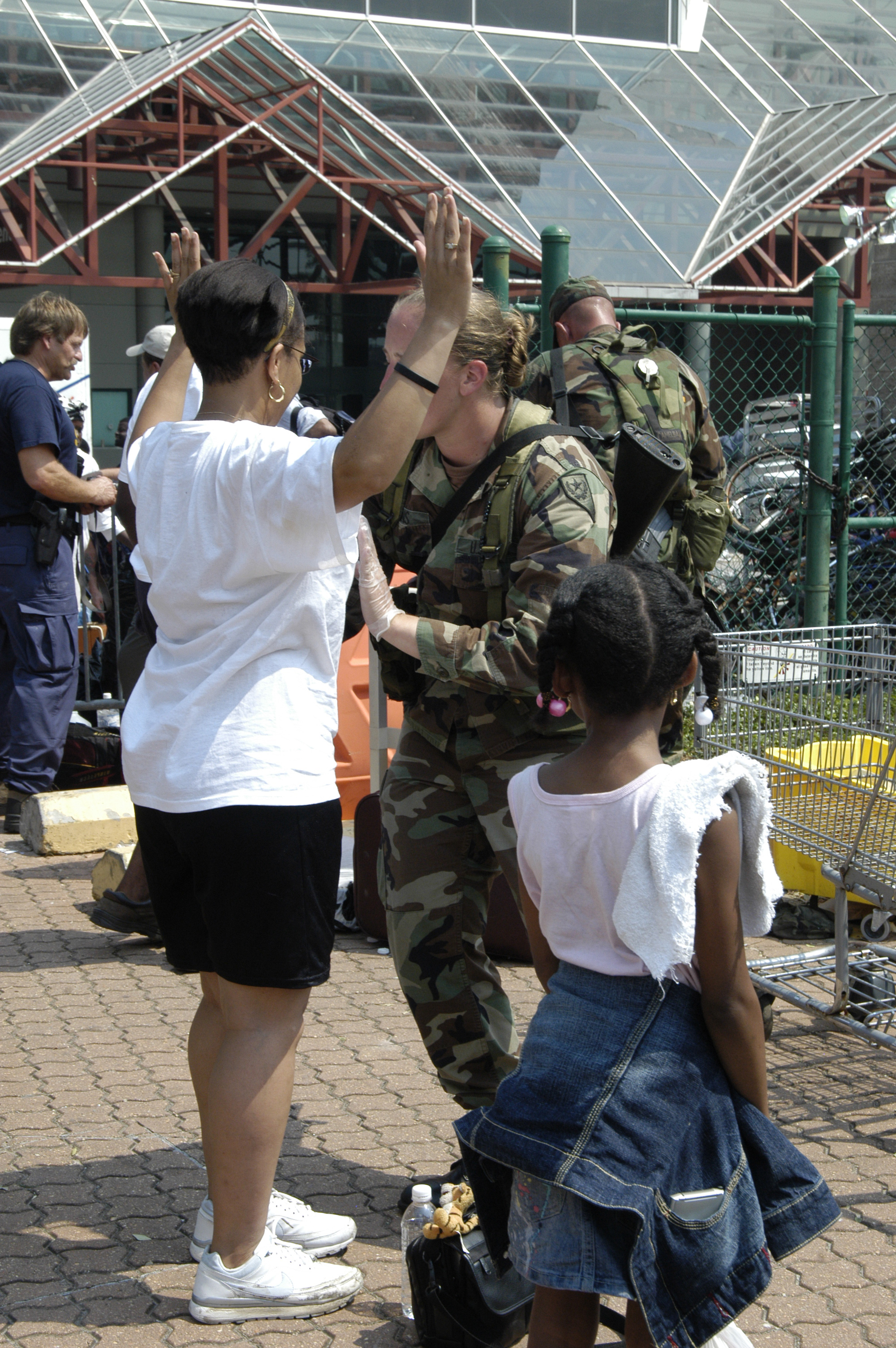
An evacuee is frisked before being airlifted out of New Orleans after Hurricane Katrina.

Frisking (also called a patdown, pat down, or pat-down) is a search of a person's outer clothing wherein a person runs their hands along the outer garments of another to detect any concealed weapons or objects with them.

== U.S. law ==
In the United States, a law enforcement officer may briefly detain a person upon reasonable suspicion of involvement in a crime but short of probable cause to arrest; such a detention is known as a Terry stop. When a search for weapons is also authorized, the procedure is known as a stop and frisk. To justify the stop, a law enforcement officer must be able to point to "specific and articulable facts" that would indicate to a reasonable person that a crime has been, is being, or is about to be committed.

If the officer reasonably suspects that the suspect is in possession of a weapon that is of danger to the officer or others, the officer may conduct a frisking of the suspect's outer garments to search for weapons. The search must be limited to what is necessary to discover weapons; however, pursuant to the "plain feel" doctrine, police may seize contraband discovered in the course of a frisk, but only if the contraband's identity is immediately apparent.

=== New York City program ===
The New York City Police Department has come under scrutiny for its use of the Terry stop. Supporters say that it reduces crime, but civil rights advocates say it is racial profiling. John A. Eterno, a former city police captain describes: "My take is that this has become more like a 'throw a wide net and see what you can find' kind of thing. I don't see it as targeted enforcement, especially when you see numbers that we are talking about." Looking at "eight odd blocks of Brownsville, Brooklyn, a study found that between January 2006 and March 2010, the police made nearly 52,000 stops." In a later review of that article about NYC's "Stop, Question, and Frisk" program, as well as the larger issue of Black people's welcome in the city, a columnist wrote "there were a record 580,000 stop-and-frisks in the city in 2009. Most of those stopped (55 percent) were Black (a large portion were also Hispanic), most were young and almost all were male. For reference, according to the Census Bureau, there were about only 300,000 Black men between the ages of 13 and 34 living in the city that year. Six percent of the stops resulted in arrests."

== See also ==
- Don't touch my junk
- Full body scanner
- Proactive policing
- Search and seizure
- Search of persons (UK)
- Stop and identify statutes
