= Smuggling organization =

Smuggling is a behavior that has occurred ever since there were laws or a moral code that tax or forbid access to a specific person or object. At the core of any smuggling organization is the economic relationship between supply and demand. From the organization's point of view, the issues are what the consumer wants, and how much the consumer is willing to pay the smuggler or smuggling organization to obtain it.

== Developmental Smuggling Model (DSM) ==
The Developmental Smuggling Model is a unified model in that it describes phases of smugglers and organizations. Smugglers are reported to fall within one of three different phases. Organizations in which there is smuggling occurring also fall within one of three different phases. Phase II is subdivided into three types of corporations.

=== Phase I Smugglers ===
Phase I smugglers are usually smuggling contraband to meet their own needs although they might smuggle enough to cover their expenses by selling some of the contraband. Mules and those who meet law enforcement "smuggler profiles" fall within this cluster of individuals.

Occasionally, individuals are enticed to carry contraband by more experienced smugglers because the professional smuggler wishes to test the security through which the mule must travel or to create a diversion when the novice smuggler is caught; thus, allowing a breach through which a larger shipment of contraband can be moved. Once the contraband is placed, the individual or family is referred to as the virgin (See Lichtenwald, 2003). The use of a "virgin smuggler" allows the professional smuggler to check his or her assessment of the security and to make sure that the contraband was not detected because "the virgin smuggler" could not control his or her emotions or behavior or because of the way the contraband was packaged, or because a bribe was not effective. The use of a "virgin smuggler" also allows the professional smuggler not to be identified.

Phase I smugglers is the group most frequently caught by the police and government agencies. These agencies focus their security and enforcement efforts on arresting individuals within this group. In May 2005 the MITRE Corporation released a press announcement reporting that they had created a computer simulation program capable of modeling the complex adaptive behaviors of smugglers. The Modeling Complex Adaptive Behavior Project was headed by Daniel Venese and sponsored by MITRE's Center for Enterprise Modernization. The program is capable of generating a steady stream of novel smuggling techniques so that strategies can be crafted to combat them. Once an agency produces these strategies, it can feed them into the simulation to test how smugglers may adapt their methods in response. Information regarding The Modeling Complex Adaptive Behavior Project can be found in The MITRE Digest.

=== Phase II Smugglers ===
Phase II smugglers are divided into two subtypes of individuals. Subtype 1 is a group of individuals who know each other and have a shared value system. The members of Subtype 1 often refer to each other as friends. Subtype 2 individuals belong to a group who have a shared value system but may not know each other as well. Subtype 2 may be a subgroup of coworkers or members of a group such as a gang or a more peaceful groups. When street gangs venture into smuggling they are a Phase II smuggling organization. The money the gangs make from smuggling is spent on supporting their criminal lifestyle. The members of Subtype 2 may have applied for a specific jobs such as bag handlers or inspectors within an industry because it allows them to be in a position to engage in crimes such as smuggling.

Phase II organizations fall into three different type of structures:

- Type 1 organizations are formed for the sole purpose of smuggling. Type 1 businesses are usually small, with only a few employees. The individuals have limited experience smuggling, although they are likely to have wanted to engage in smuggling for some time. The Type 1 businesses have yet to make a substantial profit from smuggling and have only limited contacts with individuals who can secure the contraband.
- The Type 2 organization is a legitimate business, which turned to smuggling to cover its operational expenses (as a facade).
- The Type 3 of organization is usually large and the smugglers belong to either the management or the rank and file (hourly wage earners) who exploit the smuggling opportunities inherent in the business. Type 3 smuggling organizations include the airline, shipping, boating, and land transportation industries.

The Phase II smugglers is the group that receives the most media attention.

=== Phase III Smugglers ===
Phase III smugglers and organizations are formed for the sole purpose of smuggling. There are several factors that distinguish Phase III smugglers and organization from a Phase II smuggler and organization. The Phase III individual or business smuggles with sophistication. In general, the individuals in Phase III are raised in an environment where smuggling is encouraged and considered an acceptable behavior. The individual is raised with a family history of smuggling. Phase III smugglers are very experienced at smuggling, (The smuggler captured and studied for two years in Lichtenwald's research (Lichtenwald, 2003, 2004) had worked his way up from a Phase I smuggling business to being made a member of a Phase II business, and then a Phase III smuggling organization).

The Phase III smuggling corporation is divided into formal departments such as counter intelligence, bribes, money laundering, and others. An example is when the smugglers purchase a trucking corporation that ships products such as fruits and vegetables that must be moved from location to location before an expiration date. Due to spoilage risks, the smuggling corporation can protest delays due to screening for contraband at entry ports. The smuggling corporation can select, based on their assessment of the risk of being caught, which shipments will contain the contraband. The smuggling organization invests in other businesses that offer smuggling opportunities. It may also engage in border jumping given specific opportunities. For example, when the radar balloons are not working, the smuggling organization may take advantage of the situation and jump the border.

The Phase III smuggling organization endears itself to the country from where the contraband is produced or taken and to the country that stores the contraband. Finally, it esteems itself to the country which is the final destination for the smuggled contraband. Individuals in the Phase III smuggling organization will keep their own governments and other governments focused on Phase I smugglers and Phase II smugglers and organizations, to avoid causing another government any problems or draw any attention or suspicion.
