= Search of persons =

Criminal law procedure

Police officers in various jurisdictions have power to search members of the public, for example, for weapons, drugs and stolen property.

== England and Wales ==
Police powers in England and Wales, allowing police officers to search members of the public for weapons, drugs, stolen property, terrorism-related evidence or evidence of other crimes are known as stop and search powers.

== United States ==
Searches in the United States are governed by the Fourth Amendment to the U.S. Constitution, which generally requires that the police obtain a warrant before a search is legally permissible. However, certain exceptions to the warrant requirement exist.

After stopping a person based upon the reasonable belief that the person might be engaged in unlawful activity, or following a routine encounter such as a traffic stop, the police in the United States may perform a cursory search of the persons outer clothing for their own safety. Terry v. Ohio. However, unless the object is reasonably identified by feel as a possible weapon or contraband, they may not remove objects from pockets, as that would constitute a search. Minnesota v. Dickerson. When performing a pat-down following a Terry stop that results in the officer identifying a weapon by feel, a police officer is allowed to remove the weapon from the person's clothing.

== See also ==
- Proactive policing
- Strip search
