= Paul Biddle =

British photographer

'British Food' exemplifies Paul Biddle's witty art photography.

Paul Biddle is an English fine art photographer, who specialises in creating carefully studied surreal artworks using real objects and studio lighting for artistic effects. He has exhibited widely both in Britain and around the world. He has won at least 15 international photography prizes.

Biddle describes his inspirations and influences as ranging "from Renaissance art to Dadaism and Surrealism, from Picasso to the flotsam and jetsam that I pick up on my walks by the sea near my home".

== Awards ==
- The Association of Photographers: 1 Gold, 2 Merits.
- The Royal Photographic Society: 2 Golds.
- Kodak Triple Exposure: Winner.
- 3D Illustrators (USA): I Gold, 6 Bronzes.
- Hasselblad Austrian Super Circuit: 1996 Overall Winner (27,000 entries - 101 countries).
- Polaroid European Final Awards.

== Exhibitions ==
=== UK ===
- The Association of Photographers
- Tapestry
- The Image Bank (Getty Images)
- Euro RSCG
- Lowe Lintas
- The Royal Photographic Society

=== Worldwide ===
- New York City
- Fort Lauderdale
- Tokyo
- Cologne
- Vienna
- Linz
- Arles
- Amsterdam
- The Leonardo da Vinci Museum (Milan)
- Musée de la Civilisation (Quebec)

=== Permanent Collections ===
- The Royal Photographic Society (London)
