= Peter Dazeley =

British photographer

Peter Dazeley BEM FRPS known as Dazeley, is a British photographer living and working in London, known for fine art, advertising, anamorphic and nude photography, as well as flower photography.

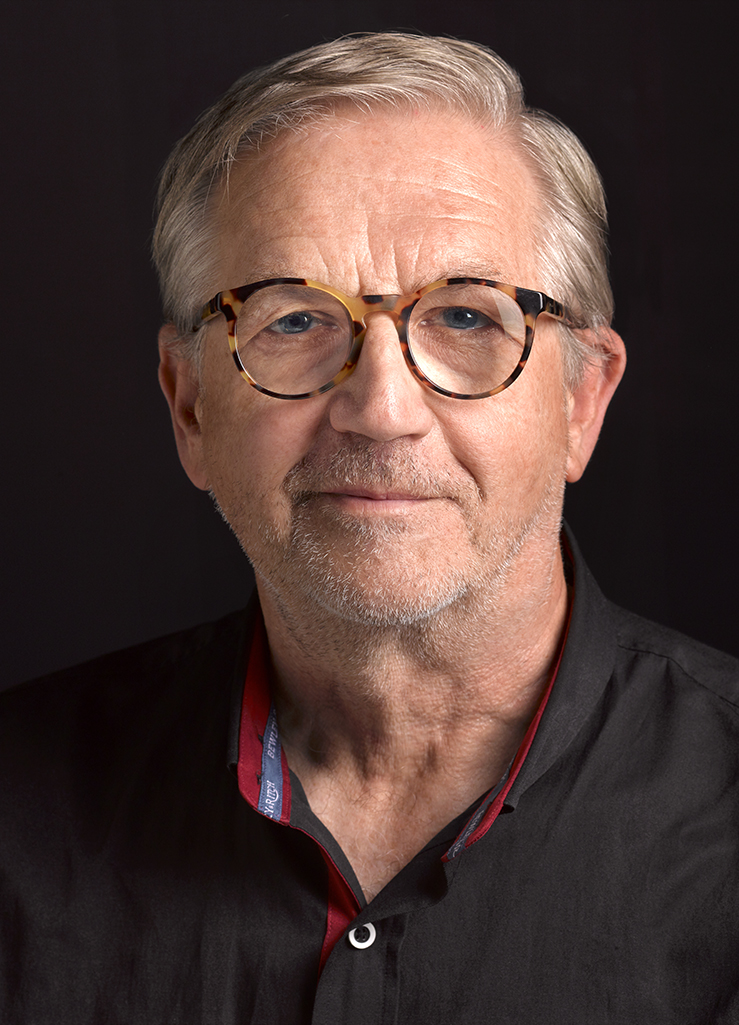

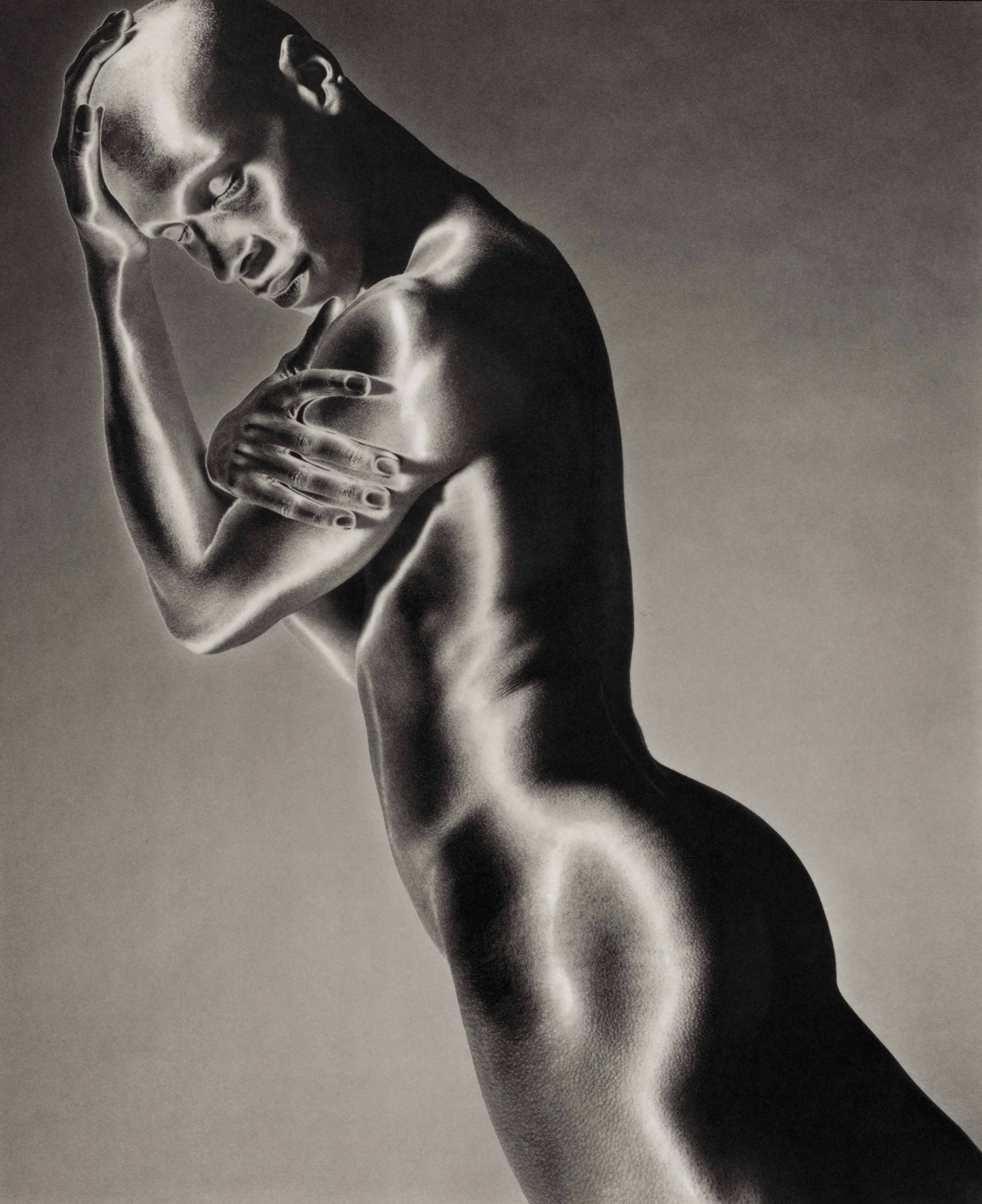
Solarised Platinum Man Photography Dazeley

== Biography ==
Dazeley was born in West Kensington, London, England, in 1948. Dazeley, son of William and Freda Dazeley MBE, is dyslexic and left school at 15 without formal qualifications. He is married and has a daughter and a son; they live in Coombe Hill, Surrey, England.

Dazeley was awarded the British Empire Medal in the Queen's New Year's Honours List, January 2017, for his services to photography and charity

== Photographic career ==
Dazeley studied photography at Holland Park Comprehensive (sometimes called the Socialist Eton) and started assisting the photographer Peter Sowerby at Essex West Studios off Fleet Street, London in 1963. His work has won awards from organisations across the world, including the Association of Photographers, the Royal Photographic Society in the UK, EPICA in France, Applied Arts Magazine in Canada, Graphis Inc. in the USA . Dazeley works with Platinum prints and is currently working on several projects including X-ray, flowers, pregnant women, anamorphic nude and solarisation (Sabattier effect) photography.

Dazeley became a member of the Association of Photographers in 1977 and became a life member in 1984.

In June 2013 Dazeley was awarded a Fellowship by the Royal Photographic Society, which is the highest distinction of the RPS and recognises original work and outstanding ability.

== Style ==
He has developed a number of imaging techniques in advertising photography, including the use of limited depth of field and the out of focus anamorphic figures as used in the Assume Nothing Campaign for the Terrence Higgins Trust. He has also used x-ray and mammogram photography for artistic purposes.

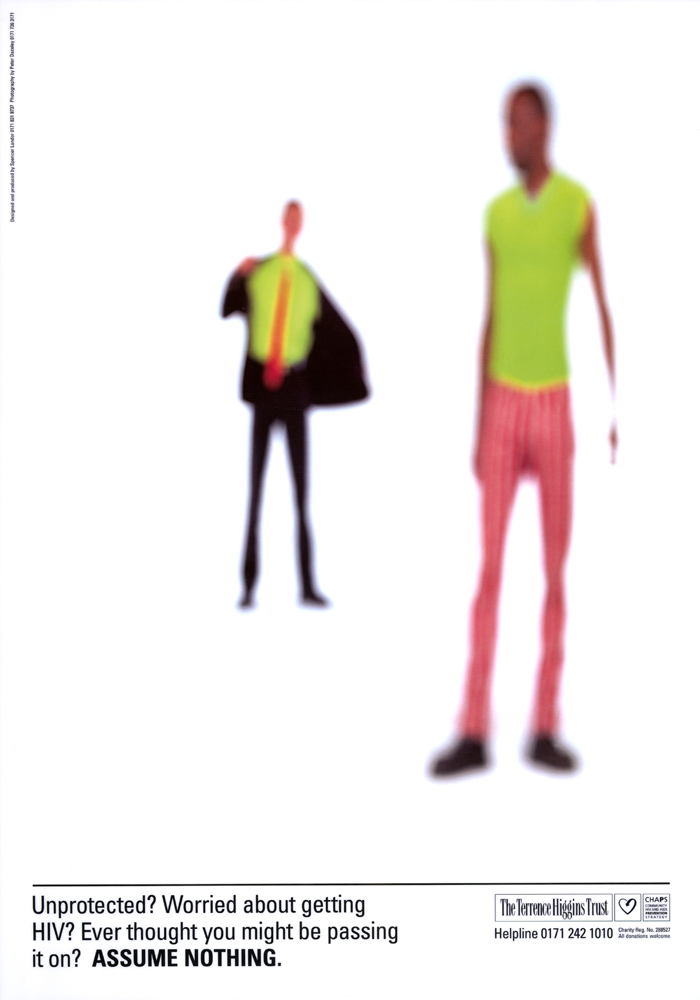
Terrence Higgins Trust photography:Dazeley

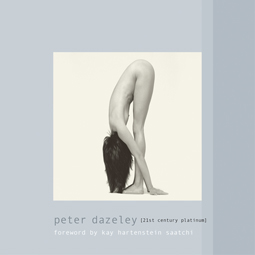

‘Jan 2010 – Dazeley has been voted amongst the top 30 most influential photographers of the decade, (Photo District News magazine, Survey Results: The 30 Most Influential Photographers of The Decade? online survey by number of votes received)’

== Books ==
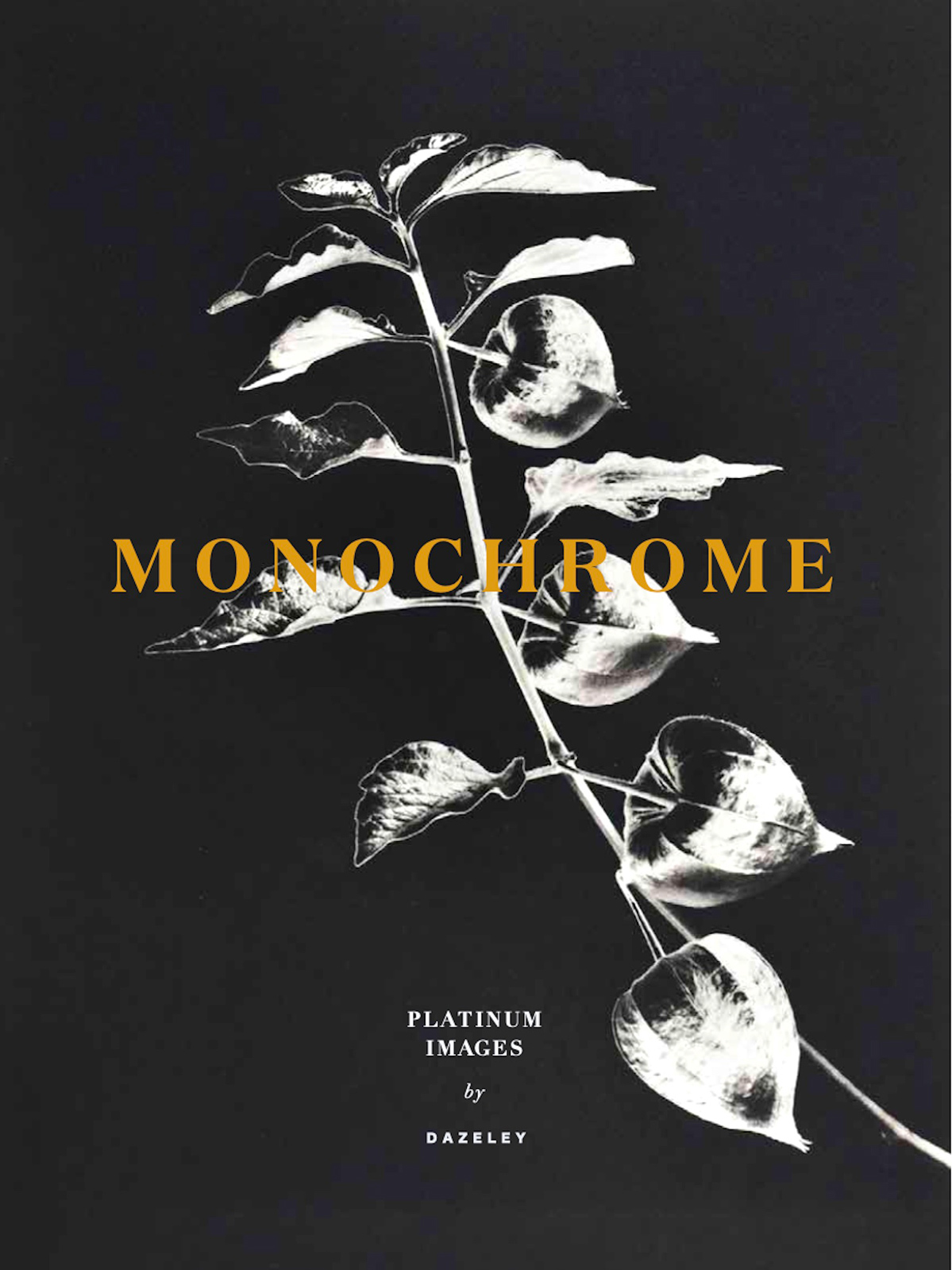
Book cover from 'Monochrome' Platinum prints by Dazeley

- London Secret & Hidden Places by Peter Dazeley, text by Mark Daly. Published by Frances Lincoln, ISBN 978-1-80570-545-1
- London Explored by Peter Dazeley, text by Mark Daly. Published by Frances Lincoln, ISBN 978-0-7112-4035-3
- Monochrome - Platinum Prints by Peter Dazeley. Published by Trope Publishing Co., ISBN 978-1951963200
- London Theatres by Peter Dazeley, text by Michael Coveney and foreword by Sir Mark Rylance. Published by Frances Lincoln, ISBN 978-0-71123-861-9
- London Uncovered by Peter Dazeley, text by Mark Daly. Published by Frances Lincoln, ISBN 978-0-71123-809-1
- Unseen London by Peter Dazeley, text by Mark Daly. Published by Frances Lincoln, ISBN 978-0-71123-551-9
- 21st Century Platinum. Design by David Clare, Exposed Design Consultants. Published by Rawkus, ISBN 0-9545138-0-0.
- Cover of One Chance my Life and Rugby by Josh Lewsey Virgin Books London, 2009 ISBN 978-1-905264-53-7
- Cover of Silverfin by Charlie Higson Puffin, London, ISBN 0-14-131859-7
- The Complete Woman Golfer. (With text by Vivien Saunders) London: Hutchinson, ISBN 0-09-124090-5
- Cliff Thorburn's Snooker Skills. (With text by Cliff Thorburn, edited by Peter Arnold.) London: Hamlyn, ISBN 0-600-55210-1.
- Platinum Prints 1988–2007 by 31 Studio
- Nudes Index 1 ISBN 3-8290-0502-4
- Nudes Index X1 ISBN 3-936761-13-2
- Graphis Photo ISBN 3-85709-294-7
- Naked Women, Quarto Books ISBN 1-56025-336-3
- Into the Light (Photographic Printing out of the Darkroom) by Coriander, 31 Studio, Permaprint and Stoneman Graphics
- Cover of High Flyer by John Francome, Headline Press, ISBN 978-0-7472-1896-8
- Wicked World by Benjamin Zephaniah, Cover Portrait of the author, Puffin, London, ISBN 0-14-130683-1

== Sources and resources ==
- https://web.archive.org/web/20110608214538/http://www.lbhf.gov.uk/Images/34_PeterDazeley_tcm21-105720.pdf
- http://dodho.com/solarized-by-peter-dazeley/
