= Dynamic Roentgen stereophotogrammetry =

Dynamic Roentgen stereophotogrammetry (also referred to as dynamic RSA) is a modern and sophisticated x-ray recording method, used to measure real-time 3D motions of prostheses and bones during motion with high accuracy. It is mostly used in orthopedic research settings and is an advancement of conventional RSA.

Conventional static RSA is used to evaluate migration of prosthesis with respect to the bone in three dimensions as a function of time. Migration of the prosthesis are normal 12‐24 months after the surgery. Ongoing migration increase the risk of aseptic loosening with revision surgery as a consequence. The method has proven valuable in the evaluation of fixation for hip and knee arthroplasty, as early RSA evaluations have shown high predictive value for later aseptic component loosening.

In contrast, Dynamic RSA makes it possible to accurately assess both micro movements in the fixation interface and kinematics of the prosthetic components in three dimensions, during active motions.
