= Clarence Madison Dally =

American glassblower and early victim of radiation dermatitis

Clarence Madison Dally (January 8, 1865 – October 2, 1904) was an American glassblower, noted as an assistant to Thomas Edison in his work on X-rays and as an early victim of radiation dermatitis and its complications. His is thought to be the first human death resulting from X-ray exposure.

== Early life and education ==
Clarence Dally was born in Woodbridge, New Jersey, one of four brothers. He enlisted in the United States Navy at the age of sixteen, and served for six years. For a time he served as a gunner's mate on the USS Enterprise.

== Glassblowing ==
After obtaining an honorable discharge he went to work at the Edison Lamp Works in Harrison with his father and brothers as a glassblower. Around 1890 he moved to the Edison Laboratory in West Orange to assist in experiments with the incandescent lamp.

== Working with Edison ==
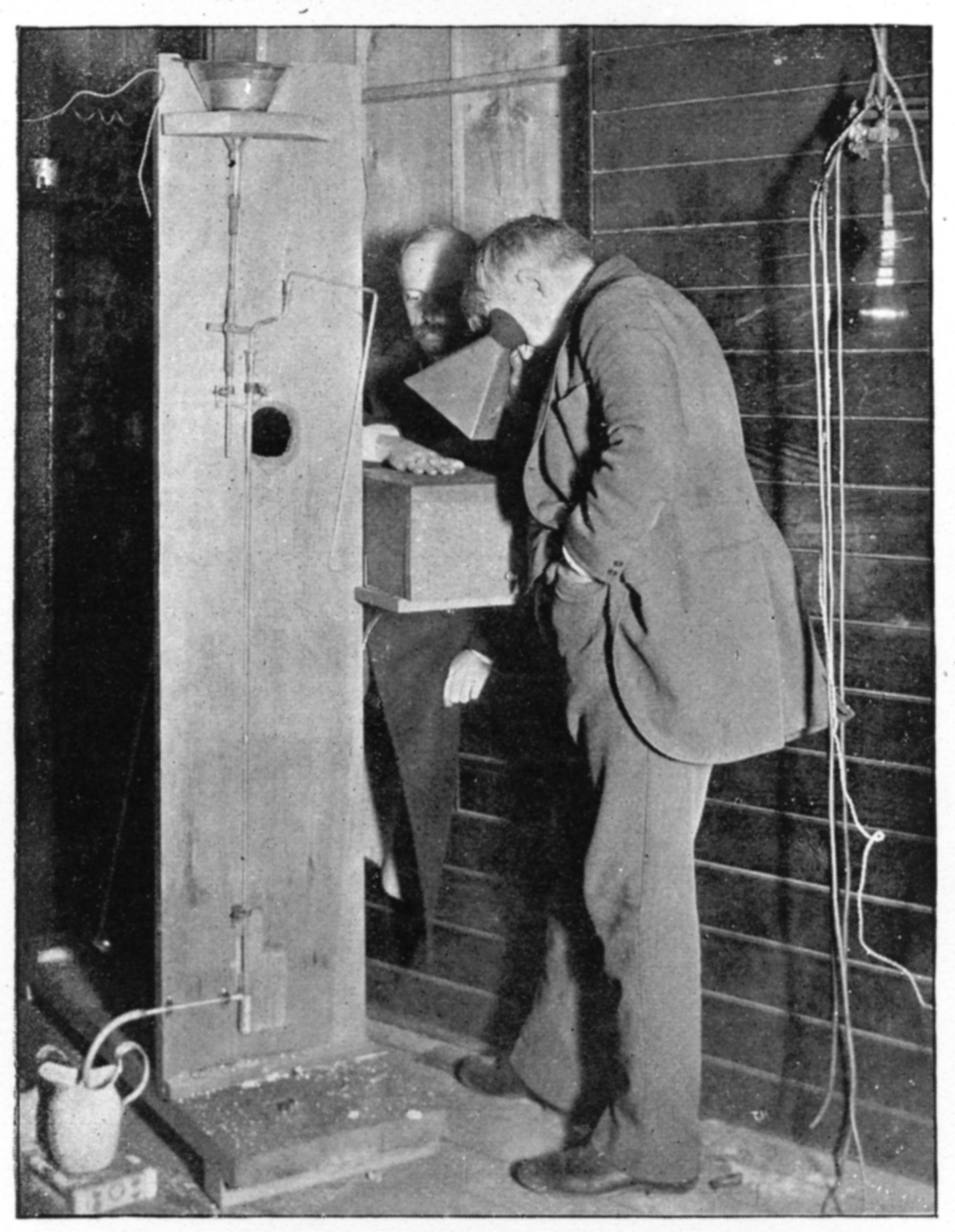
Edison using a calcium tungstate fluoroscope to examine a hand by X-rays. The man with Edison has been identified as Thomas Commerford Martin but may be Clarence Dally.

Dally was a favored employee of Thomas Edison. He was entrusted to help demonstrate Edison's new fluoroscopic machine at the 1896 National Electric Light Association exhibition. Some sources list Clarence Dally as having been on standby with the X-ray equipment in Buffalo, New York, in case it was to be needed by doctors operating on President William McKinley after he was shot on September 6, 1901. However, this was not Clarence Dally, but his brother, Charles, also an assistant of Edison. He was accompanied by fellow Edison employee Charles Luhr.

== Edison X-ray focus tube ==
Following Röntgen's work on X-rays in 1895, Clarence and his brother Charles worked on the development of the Edison X-ray focus tube, developing the fluoroscope using calcium tungstate. The Edison fluoroscope produced sharper images than the Röntgen fluoroscope, which used barium platinocyanide. At the time, the levels of X-rays produced were not believed to be dangerous. However, Edison noted how "the x-ray had affected poisonously my assistant, Mr. Dally."

== Radiation effects ==
By 1900, Clarence Dally was suffering radiation damage to his hands and face sufficient to require time off work. Due to him being right handed, he used his left to test the beam from the machine. This caused his left hand to be affected before his right. In 1902, one lesion on his left wrist was treated unsuccessfully with multiple skin grafts and eventually his left hand was amputated. An ulceration on his right hand necessitated the amputation of four fingers.

These procedures failed to halt the progression of his carcinoma, and despite the amputation of his arms at the elbow and shoulder, he died from mediastinal cancer. Dally is thought to be the first American to die from the effects of experimentation with radiation. Following this, Thomas Edison abandoned his research on X-rays; he said "Don't talk to me about X-rays; I am afraid of them" in 1903.

== Personal life ==
Dally was survived by his wife Maud and two sons, Ralph and Clarence.

== See also ==
- Nuclear labor issues
- List of civilian radiation accidents
