= Tim Flach =

British photographer

- Born: London
- Occupation: Photographer
- Website: timflach.com (requires Flash)

Tim Flach is a British photographer who specialises in studio photography of animals. He has published several books of photographs.

== Life ==
Flach was born in London, where he works and lives with his wife and son.

== Work ==
Flach works in a studio in Shoreditch, in the East End of London. Many of his photographs are of captive animals and are taken under highly controlled conditions with the help of a large support team; he sometimes employs techniques more usual in human portraiture. For his book Endangered, published in 2017, he also photographed some wild animals in their natural habitat.

His work has appeared in National Geographic, Creative Review, The New York Times, The Guardian and The New Scientist. He has lectured at various universities, and at institutions such as the Zoological Society of London and the St Petersburg International Economic Forum.

== Publications ==
- Equus (2008). New York; London: Abrams. ISBN 9780810971424
- Dogs (2010). New York; London: Abrams. ISBN 9780810997646
- More Than Human (2012). New York; London: Abrams. ISBN 9781419706677 (text by Lewis Blackwell)
- Evolution (2013). Hamburg: Stern Gruner + Jahr. ISBN 9783652001588
- Endangered (2017). New York: Abrams. ISBN 9781419726514 (with Jonathan E.M. Baillie and Sam Wells)
- Feline (2025). New York: Abrams. ISBN 9798896840466

== Positions held and awards ==
- 2013: Honorary Doctorate | Norwich University of the Arts, "for services to Photography".
- 2013: Honorary Fellow of the Royal Photographic Society (HonFRPS)
- 2019 to present: President of the Association of Photographers (AOP)
