= Roentgen stereophotogrammetry =

- Purpose: assessment of three-dimensional migration/micromotion of joint replacement prosthesis

Roentgen stereophotogrammetry (RSA) is a highly accurate technique for the assessment of three-dimensional migration and micromotion of a joint replacement prosthesis relative to the bone it is attached to. It was introduced in 1974 by Göran Selvik.

Several studies have found implant migration to be predictive of long-term implant survival and, for most devices, measurement over 2 years might therefore provide a surrogate outcome measure with relatively low numbers of subjects, e.g. from 15 to 25 patients in each group in randomized studies. A smaller number of subjects can be used in these studies as a consequence of the high accuracy of the measurement technique. Because of this, RSA is an important technique in early clinical trials for screening new joint replacement prostheses.

== Methodology ==
To achieve the high accuracy, the following steps are carried out: Small radio opaque markers are introduced in the bone and attached to the prosthesis to serve as well-defined artificial landmarks. Two synchronised x-ray foci are used to obtain a stereo image of the bone and the prosthesis. The positions of the foci are assessed using a calibration object that holds tantalum markers at accurately known positions. The coordinates of the bone and prosthesis markers are accurately measured and the three-dimensional position of the markers is reconstructed using software. The change in the position (translation and rotation) of the prosthesis markers relative to the bone markers is then determined. The reported accuracy of RSA ranges between 0.05 and 0.5 mm for translations and between 0.15˚ and 1.15˚ for rotations (95% confidence interval). New RSA techniques that avoid the need for attaching markers to the prosthesis have been introduced.

== Computed tomography based RSA ==
Computed tomography-based RSA (CT-RSA) has emerged as a promising alternative for implant migration measurements as it overcomes some of the limitations of conventional RSA, for example it only requires a regular CT scanner compared to RSA which can only be performed in specialized laboratories. It has so far demonstrated comparable precision and accuracy to conventional RSA for early implant migration measurements.

CT-RSA measures the change in position of one radiodense object (bone or implant) relative to another reference object (bone or implant) and therefore requires two subsequent CT-examination volumes. The technique can detect relative micromotion between vertebrae with high accuracy. Below is a brief summary of the method; a more detailed description is available in the referenced articles.

1. The two CT volumes are imported to the CT-RSA system where the reference body (typically bone which is a stationary object) is identified from baseline and follow-up CT examinations.
2. The moving body (typically a part of the metallic implant) is identified in a similar way.
3. The images are aligned and matched using landmark-based computer assisted merging which ensures accurate matching of the moving body across the different time points for the scans.
4. A coordinate system is adjusted based on anatomical landmarks and/or implant geometry.
5. Migration data is calculated and the data is reported as translation in millimeters and rotation in degrees, similar to conventional RSA. The longitudinal axis is termed Z and measures translation in distal to proximal direction and internal rotation. The sagittal axis is termed Y and measures anterior to posterior translation and abduction of the implant. The transverse axis is termed X and measures translation in the lateral to medial direction and anterior tilt of the implant.

== See also ==
- Roentgen radiation
- Stereophotogrammetry
- Dynamic Roentgen stereophotogrammetry
