= Platinocyanide =

Chemical compound

Platinocyanide, also known as tetracyanoplatinate (IUPAC), cyanoplatinate, or platinocyanate, is a polyatomic ion with the molecular formula [Pt(CN)_{4}]^{2−}. The name also applies to compounds containing this ion, which are salts of the hypothetical platinocyanic acid (sometimes platinocyanhydric acid).

Barium platinocyanide, Ba[Pt(CN)_{4}], is a phosphor and a scintillator. It fluoresces green in the presence of x-rays and gamma rays. It was important in the discovery of X-rays, and in the development of the fluoroscope.

One platinocyanide salt, Krogmann's salt (dipotassium tetracyanoplatinate bromide trihydrate), has unusually high electronic conductivity, which - at room temperature- resembles metallic conductivity more than polaronic conductivity.
