= X-ray =

Form of electromagnetic radiation

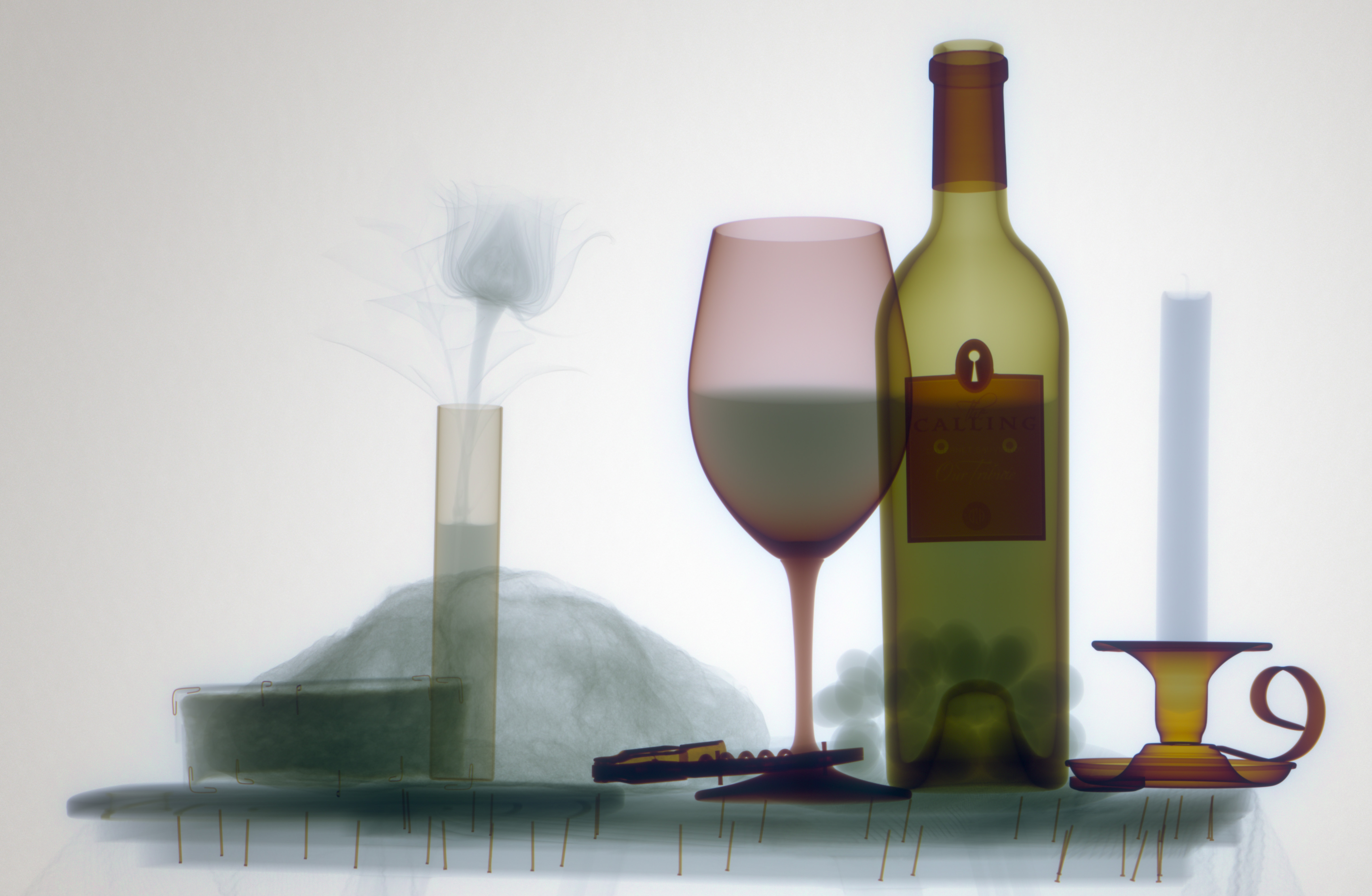
Natural color X-ray photogram of a wine scene. Note the edges of hollow cylinders as compared to the solid candle.

William Coolidge explains medical imaging and X-rays.

An X-ray is a form of high-energy electromagnetic radiation with a wavelength shorter than those of ultraviolet rays and longer than those of gamma rays. Roughly, X-rays have a wavelength ranging from 10 nanometers to 10 picometers, corresponding to frequencies in the range of 30 petahertz to 30 exahertz (3×10^{16} Hz to 3×10^{19} Hz) and photon energies in the range of 100 eV to 100 keV, respectively.

X-rays were discovered in 1895 by the German scientist Wilhelm Conrad Röntgen, who named it X-radiation to signify an unknown type of radiation.

X-rays can penetrate many solid substances such as construction materials and living tissue, so X-ray radiography is widely used in medical diagnostics (e.g., checking for broken bones) and materials science (e.g., identification of some chemical elements and detecting weak points in construction materials). However X-rays are ionizing radiation and exposure can be hazardous to health, causing DNA damage, cancer and, at higher intensities, burns and radiation sickness. Their generation and use is strictly controlled by public health authorities.

== History ==
=== Pre-Röntgen observations and research ===
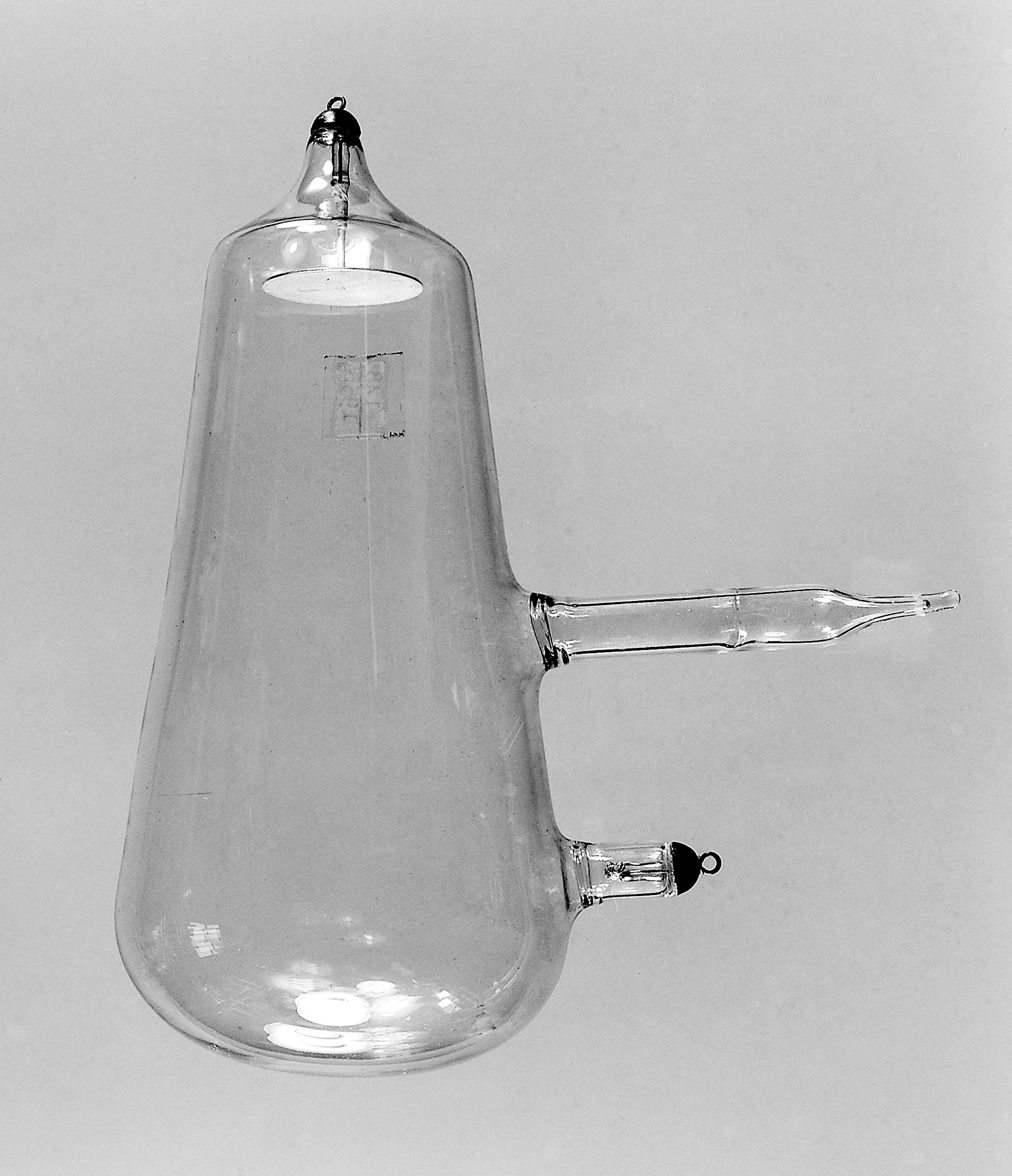
Example of a Crookes tube, a type of discharge tube that emitted X-rays

X-rays were originally noticed in science as a type of unidentified radiation emanating from discharge tubes by experimenters investigating cathode rays produced by such tubes, which are energetic electron beams that were first observed in 1869. Early researchers noticed effects that were attributable to them in many of the early Crookes tubes (invented around 1875). Crookes tubes created free electrons by ionization of the residual air in the tube by a high DC voltage of anywhere between a few kilovolts and 100 kV. This voltage accelerated the electrons coming from the cathode to a high enough velocity that they created X-rays when they struck the anode or the glass wall of the tube.

The earliest experimenter thought to have (unknowingly) produced X-rays was William Morgan. In 1785, he presented a paper to the Royal Society of London describing the effects of passing electrical currents through a partially evacuated glass tube, producing a glow created by X-rays. This work was further explored by Humphry Davy and his assistant Michael Faraday.

Starting in 1888, Philipp Lenard conducted experiments to see whether cathode rays could pass out of the Crookes tube into the air. He built a Crookes tube with a "window" at the end made of thin aluminium, facing the cathode so the cathode rays would strike it (later called a "Lenard tube"). He found that something came through, that would expose photographic plates and cause fluorescence. He measured the penetrating power of these rays through various materials. It has been suggested that at least some of these "Lenard rays" were actually X-rays.

Hermann von Helmholtz formulated mathematical equations for X-rays. He postulated a dispersion theory before Röntgen made his discovery and announcement. He based it on the electromagnetic theory of light. However, he did not work with actual X-rays.

In early 1890 photographer William Jennings and associate professor of the University of Pennsylvania Arthur W. Goodspeed were making photographs of coins with electric sparks. On 22 February after the end of their experiments two coins were left on a stack of photographic plates before Goodspeed demonstrated to Jennings the operation of Crookes tubes. While developing the plates, Jennings noticed disks of unknown origin on some of the plates, but nobody could explain them, and they moved on. Only in 1896 they realized that they accidentally made an X-ray photograph (they didn't claim a discovery).

Also in 1890, Röntgen's assistant Ludwig Zehnder noticed a flash of light from a fluorescent screen immediately before the covered tube he was switching on punctured.

When Stanford University physics professor Fernando Sanford conducted his "electric photography" experiments in 1891–1893 by photographing coins in the light of electric sparks, like Jennings and Goodspeed, he may have unknowingly generated and detected X-rays. His letter of January 6, 1893 to the Physical Review was duly published and an article entitled Without Lens or Light, Photographs Taken With Plate and Object in Darkness appeared in the San Francisco Examiner.

In 1894, Nikola Tesla noticed damaged film in his lab that seemed to be associated with Crookes tube experiments and began investigating this invisible, radiant energy. After Röntgen identified the X-ray, Tesla began making X-ray images of his own using high voltages and tubes of his own design, as well as Crookes tubes.

=== Discovery by Röntgen ===
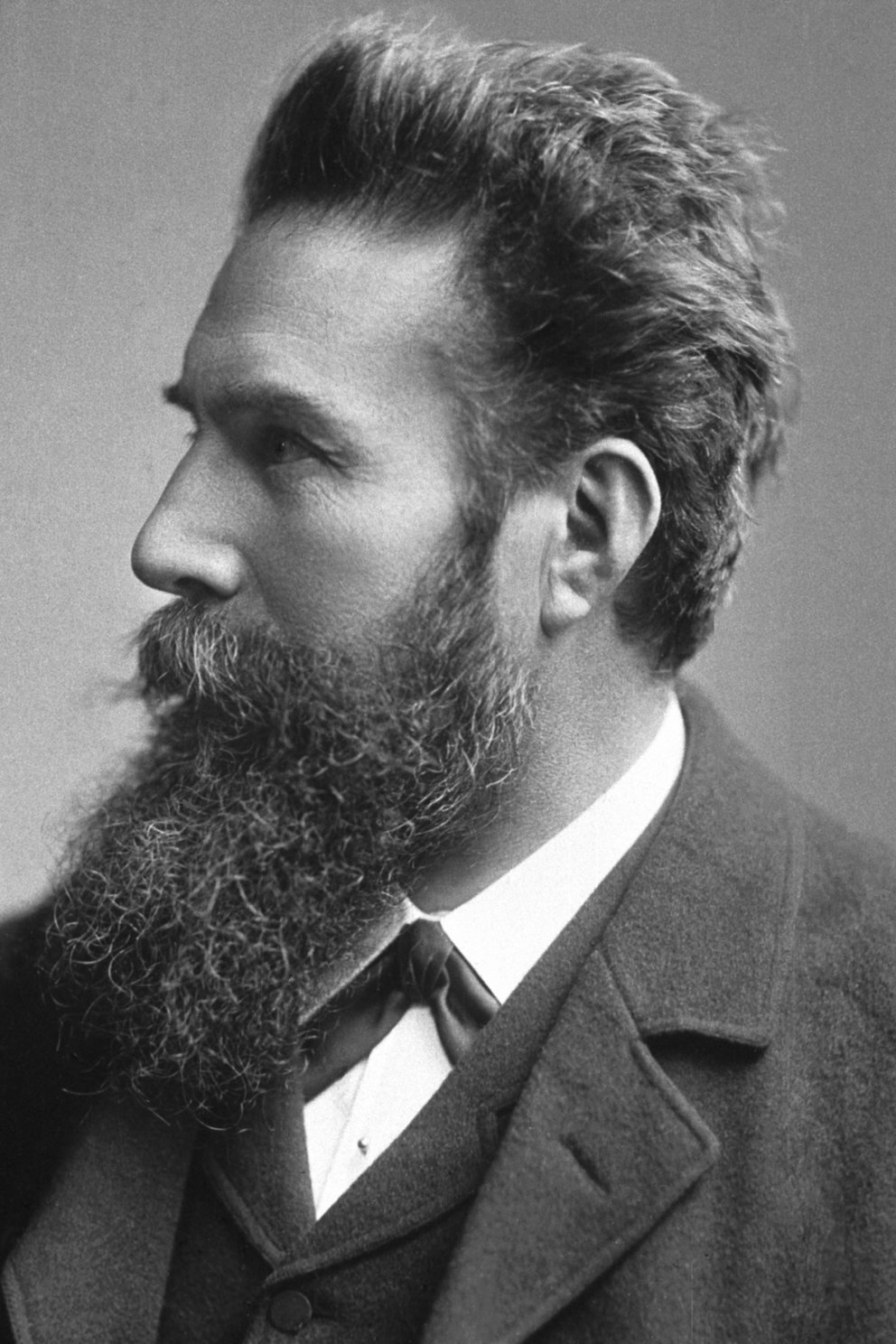
Wilhelm Röntgen

On 8 November 1895, German physics professor Wilhelm Röntgen discovered X-rays while experimenting with Lenard tubes and Crookes tubes and began studying them. He wrote an initial report "On a new kind of ray: A preliminary communication" and on 28 December 1895, submitted it to Würzburg's Physical-Medical Society journal. This was the first paper written on X-rays. Röntgen referred to the radiation as "X", to indicate that it was an unknown type of radiation. Some early texts refer to them as Chi-rays, having interpreted "X" as the uppercase Greek letter Chi, Χ.

There are conflicting accounts of his discovery because Röntgen had his lab notes burned after his death, but this is a likely reconstruction by his biographers: Röntgen was investigating cathode rays from a Crookes tube which he had wrapped in black cardboard so that the visible light from the tube would not interfere, using a fluorescent screen painted with barium platinocyanide. He noticed a faint green glow from the screen, about 1 meter (3.3 ft) away. Röntgen realized some invisible rays coming from the tube were passing through the cardboard to make the screen glow. He found they could also pass through books and papers on his desk. Röntgen threw himself into investigating these unknown rays systematically. Two months after his initial discovery, he published his paper.

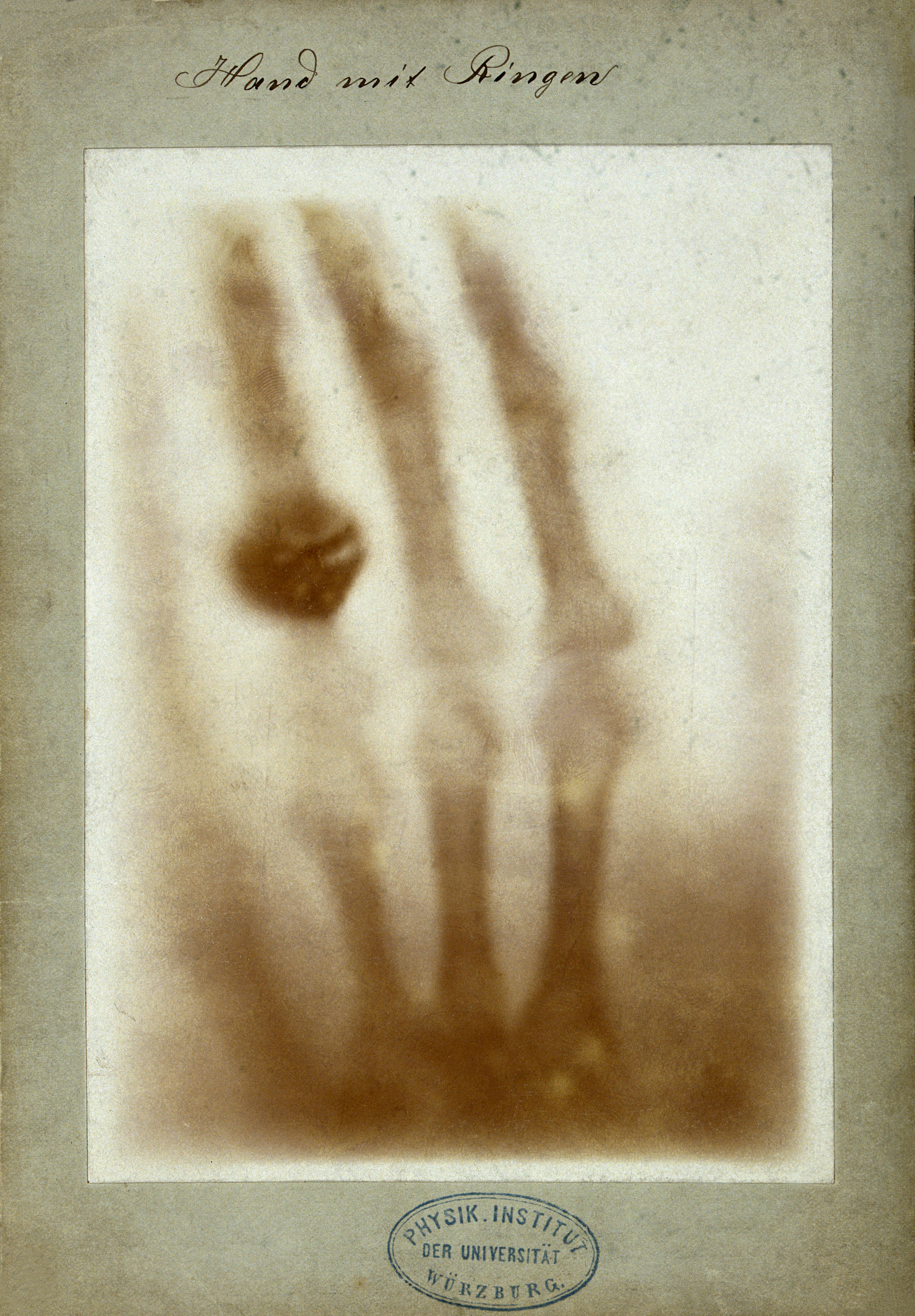
Hand mit Ringen (Hand with Rings): print of Wilhelm Röntgen's first "medical" X-ray, of his wife's hand, taken on 22 December 1895, and presented to Ludwig Zehnder of the Physik Institut, University of Freiburg, on January 1, 1896

Röntgen discovered their medical use when he made a picture of his wife Anna Bertha Ludwig's hand on a photographic plate formed due to X-rays. The photograph of his wife's hand was the first photograph of a human body part using X-rays. When she saw the picture, she said "I have seen my death."

The discovery of X-rays generated significant interest. Röntgen's biographer Otto Glasser estimated that, in 1896 alone, as many as 49 essays and 1044 articles about the new rays were published. This was probably a conservative estimate, if one considers that nearly every paper around the world extensively reported about the new discovery, with a magazine such as Science dedicating as many as 23 articles to it in that year alone. Sensationalist reactions to the new discovery included publications linking the new kind of rays to occult and paranormal theories, such as telepathy.

The name X-rays stuck, although (over Röntgen's great objections) many of his colleagues suggested calling them Röntgen rays. They are still referred to as such in many languages, including German, Hungarian, Ukrainian, Danish, Polish, Czech, Bulgarian, Swedish, Finnish, Portuguese, Estonian, Slovak, Slovenian, Turkish, Russian, Latvian, Lithuanian, Albanian, Japanese, Dutch, Georgian, Hebrew, Icelandic, and Norwegian.

Röntgen received the inaugural Nobel Prize in Physics for his discovery.

=== Advances in radiology ===
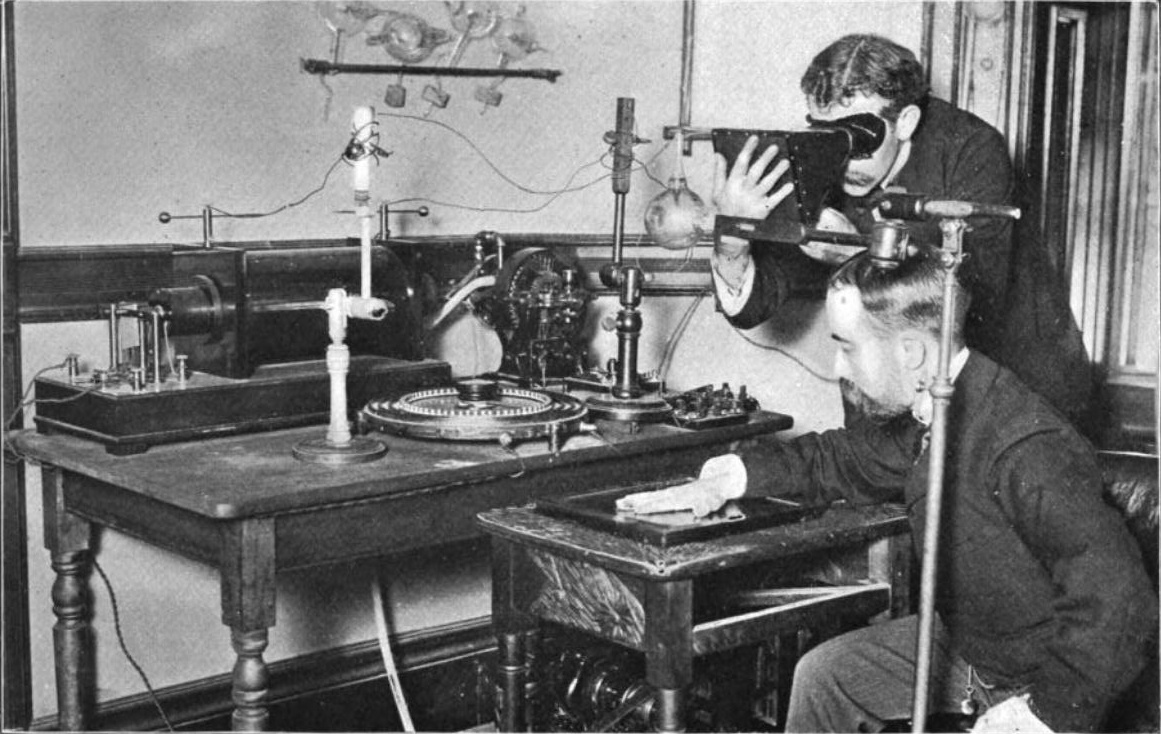
Taking an X-ray image with early Crookes tube apparatus, late 1800s. The Crookes tube is visible in center. The standing man is viewing his hand with a fluoroscope screen. The seated man is taking a radiograph of his hand by placing it on a photographic plate. No precautions against radiation exposure are taken; its hazards were not known at the time.

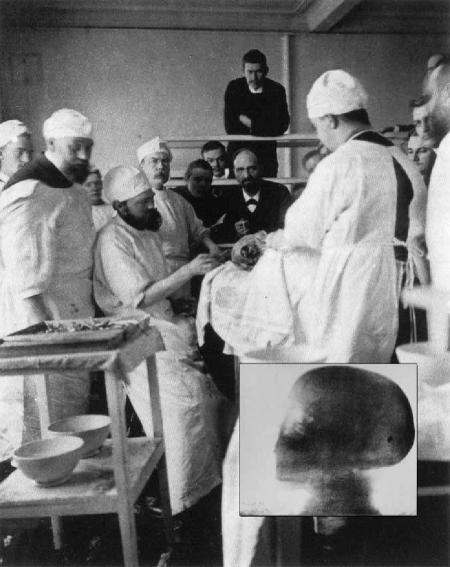
Surgical removal of a bullet whose location was diagnosed with X-rays (see inset) in 1897

Röntgen immediately noticed X-rays could have medical applications. Along with his 28 December Physical-Medical Society submission, he sent a letter to physicians he knew around Europe (1 January 1896). News (and the creation of "shadowgrams") spread rapidly with Scottish electrical engineer Alan Archibald Campbell-Swinton being the first after Röntgen to create an X-ray photograph (of a hand). Through February, there were 46 experimenters taking up the technique in North America alone.

The first use of X-rays under clinical conditions was by John Hall-Edwards in Birmingham, England on 11 January 1896, when he radiographed a needle stuck in the hand of an associate. On 14 February 1896, Hall-Edwards was also the first to use X-rays in a surgical operation.

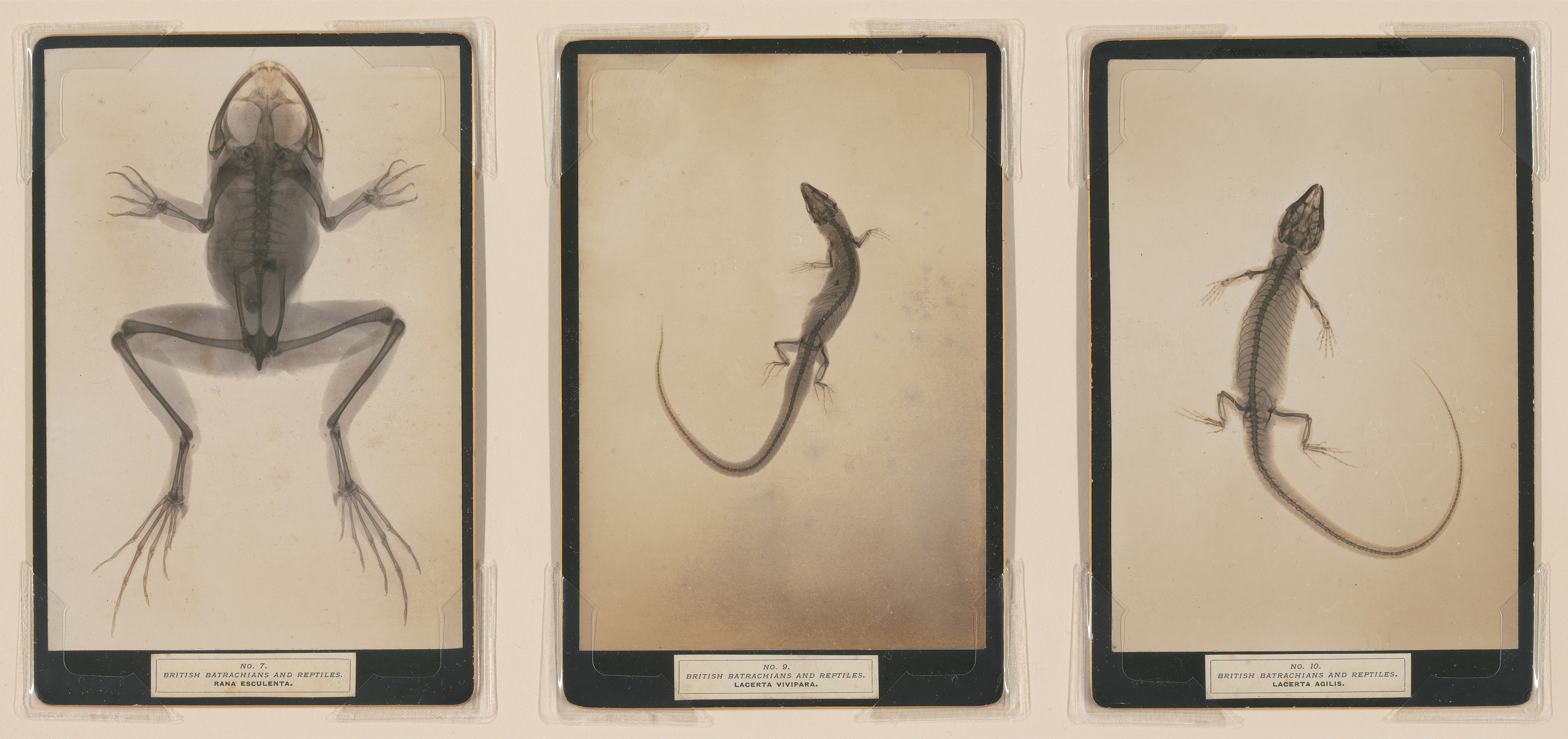
Images by James Green, from "Sciagraphs of British Batrachians and Reptiles" (1897), featuring (from left) Rana esculenta (now Pelophylax lessonae), Lacerta vivipara (now Zootoca vivipara), and Lacerta agilis

In early 1896, several weeks after Röntgen's discovery, Ivan Romanovich Tarkhanov irradiated frogs and insects with X-rays, concluding that the rays "not only photograph, but also affect the living function". At around the same time, the zoological illustrator James Green began to use X-rays to examine fragile specimens. George Albert Boulenger first mentioned this work in a paper he delivered before the Zoological Society of London in May 1896. The book Sciagraphs of British Batrachians and Reptiles (sciagraph is an obsolete name for an X-ray photograph), by Green and James H. Gardiner, with a foreword by Boulenger, was published in 1897.

The first medical X-ray made in the United States was obtained using a discharge tube of Ivan Puluj's design. In January 1896, on reading of Röntgen's discovery, Frank Austin of Dartmouth College tested all of the discharge tubes in the physics laboratory and found that only the Puluj tube produced X-rays. This was a result of Puluj's inclusion of an oblique "target" of mica, used for holding samples of fluorescent material, within the tube. On 3 February 1896, Gilman Frost, professor of medicine at the college, and his brother Edwin Frost, professor of physics, exposed the wrist of Eddie McCarthy, whom Gilman had treated some weeks earlier for a fracture, to the X-rays and collected the resulting image of the broken bone on gelatin photographic plates obtained from Howard Langill, a local photographer also interested in Röntgen's work.

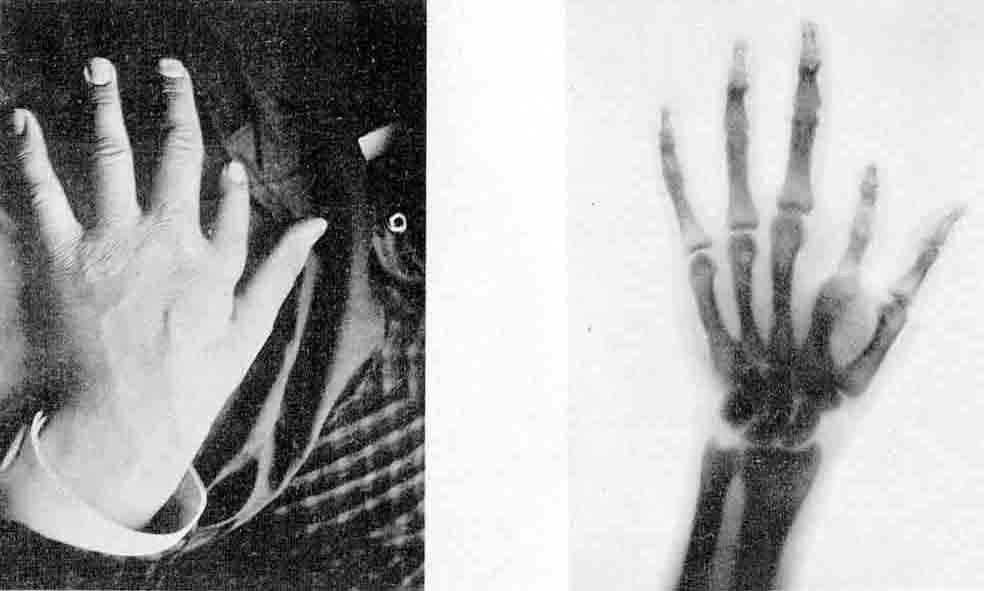
1896 plaque published in "Nouvelle Iconographie de la Salpetrière", a medical journal. On the left a hand deformity, on the right the same hand seen using radiography. The authors named the technique Röntgen photography.

Many experimenters, including Röntgen himself in his original experiments, came up with methods to view X-ray images "live" using some form of luminescent screen. Röntgen used a screen coated with barium platinocyanide. On 5 February 1896, live imaging devices were developed by both Italian scientist Enrico Salvioni (his "cryptoscope") and William Francis Magie of Princeton University (his "Skiascope"), both using barium platinocyanide. American inventor Thomas Edison started research soon after Röntgen's discovery and investigated materials' ability to fluoresce when exposed to X-rays, finding that calcium tungstate was the most effective substance. In May 1896, he developed the first mass-produced live imaging device, his "Vitascope", later called the fluoroscope, which became the standard for medical X-ray examinations. Edison dropped X-ray research around 1903, before the death of Clarence Madison Dally, one of his glassblowers. Dally had a habit of testing X-ray tubes on his own hands, developing a cancer in them so tenacious that both arms were amputated in a futile attempt to save his life; in 1904, he became the first known death attributed to X-ray exposure. During the time the fluoroscope was being developed, Serbian American physicist Mihajlo Pupin, using a calcium tungstate screen developed by Edison, found that using a fluorescent screen decreased the exposure time it took to create an X-ray for medical imaging from an hour to a few minutes.

In 1901, U.S. President William McKinley was shot twice in an assassination attempt while attending the Pan American Exposition in Buffalo, New York. While one bullet only grazed his sternum, another had lodged somewhere deep inside his abdomen and could not be found. A worried McKinley aide sent word to inventor Thomas Edison to rush an X-ray machine to Buffalo to find the stray bullet. It arrived but was not used. While the shooting itself had not been lethal, gangrene had developed along the path of the bullet, and McKinley died of septic shock due to bacterial infection six days later.

=== Hazards discovered ===
With the widespread experimentation with X‑rays after their discovery in 1895 by scientists, physicians, and inventors came many stories of burns, hair loss, and worse in technical journals of the time. In February 1896, Professor John Daniel and William Lofland Dudley of Vanderbilt University reported hair loss after Dudley was X-rayed. A child who had been shot in the head was brought to the Vanderbilt laboratory in 1896. Before trying to find the bullet, an experiment was attempted, for which Dudley "with his characteristic devotion to science" volunteered. Daniel reported that 21 days after taking a picture of Dudley's skull (with an exposure time of one hour), he noticed a bald spot 5 centimeters (2 in) in diameter on the part of his head nearest the X-ray tube: "A plate holder with the plates towards the side of the skull was fastened and a coin placed between the skull and the head. The tube was fastened at the other side at a distance of one-half-inch [1.3 cm] from the hair."

In August 1896, H. D. Hawks, a graduate of Columbia College, suffered severe hand and chest burns from an X-ray demonstration. It was reported in Electrical Review and led to many other reports of problems associated with X-rays being sent in to the publication. Many experimenters including Elihu Thomson at Edison's lab, William J. Morton, and Nikola Tesla also reported burns. Elihu Thomson deliberately exposed a finger to an X-ray tube over a period of time and suffered pain, swelling, and blistering. Other effects were sometimes blamed for the damage including ultraviolet rays and (according to Tesla) ozone. Many physicians claimed there were no effects from X-ray exposure at all. On 3 August 1905, in San Francisco, California, Elizabeth Fleischman, an American X-ray pioneer, died from complications as a result of her work with X-rays.

Hall-Edwards developed a cancer (then called X-ray dermatitis) sufficiently advanced by 1904 to cause him to write papers and give public addresses on the dangers of X-rays. His left arm had to be amputated at the elbow in 1908, and four fingers on his right arm soon thereafter, leaving only a thumb. His amputated left hand was placed at the University of Birmingham as a specimen. He died of cancer in 1926.

=== 20th century and beyond ===
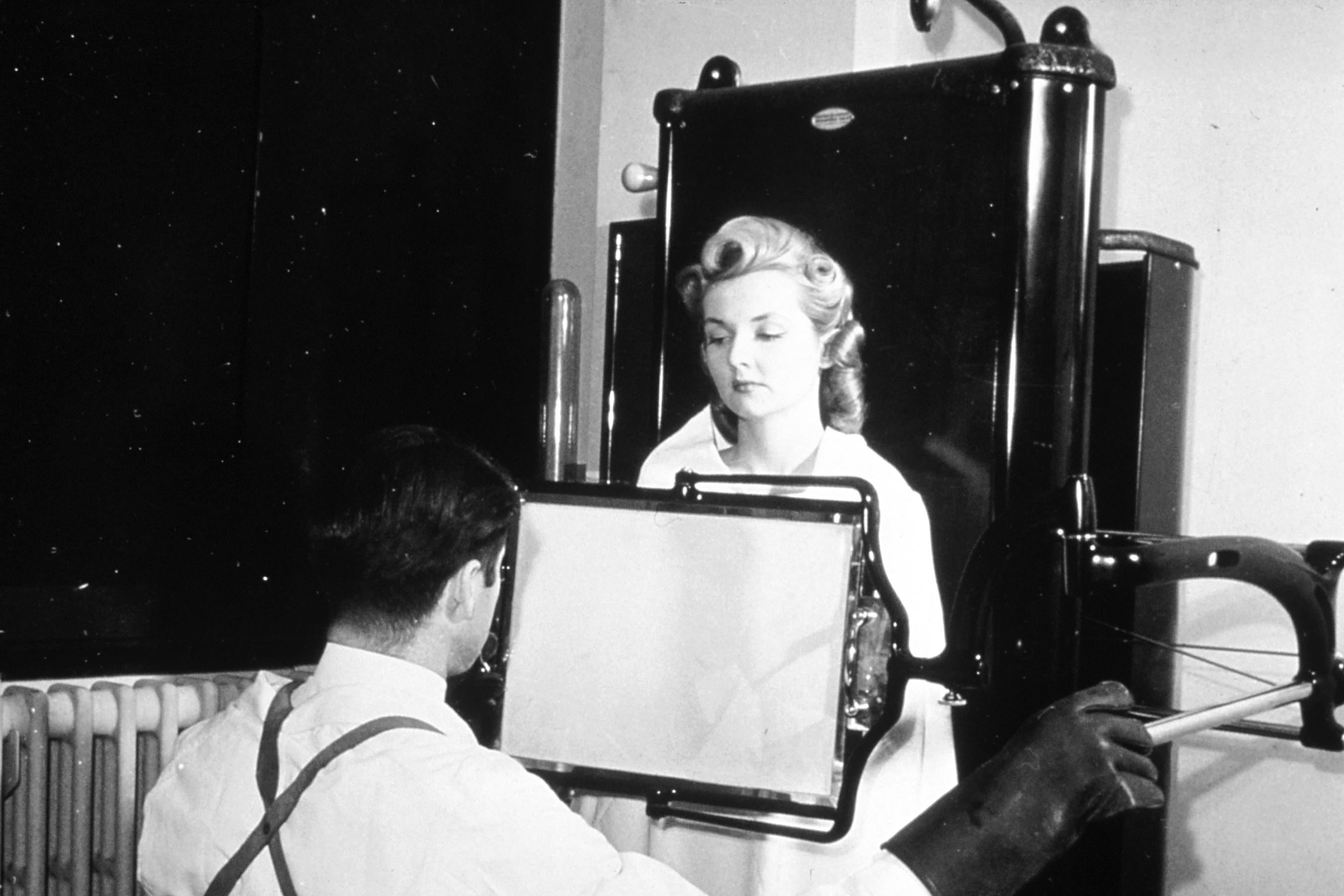
A patient being examined with a thoracic fluoroscope in 1940, which displayed continuous moving images. This image was used to argue that radiation exposure during the X-ray procedure would be negligible.

The many applications of X-rays immediately generated enormous interest. Workshops began making specialized versions of Crookes tubes for generating X-rays and these first-generation cold cathode or Crookes X-ray tubes were used until about 1920.

A typical early 20th-century medical X-ray system consisted of a Ruhmkorff coil connected to a cold cathode Crookes X-ray tube. A spark gap was typically connected to the high voltage side in parallel to the tube and used for diagnostic purposes. The spark gap allowed detecting the polarity of the sparks, measuring voltage by the length of the sparks thus determining the "hardness" of the vacuum of the tube, and it provided a load in the event the X-ray tube was disconnected. To detect the hardness of the tube, the spark gap was initially opened to the widest setting. While the coil was operating, the operator reduced the gap until sparks began to appear. A tube in which the spark gap began to spark at around 6.4 centimeters (2.5 in) was considered soft (low vacuum) and suitable for thin body parts such as hands and arms. A 13-centimeter (5 in) spark indicated the tube was suitable for shoulders and knees. An 18-to-23-centimeter (7 to 9 in) spark would indicate a higher vacuum suitable for imaging the abdomen of larger individuals. Since the spark gap was connected in parallel to the tube, the spark gap had to be opened until the sparking ceased to operate the tube for imaging. Exposure time for photographic plates was around half a minute for a hand to a couple of minutes for a thorax. The plates may have a small addition of fluorescent salt to reduce exposure times.

Crookes tubes were unreliable. They had to contain a small quantity of gas (invariably air) as a current will not flow in such a tube if they are fully evacuated. However, as time passed, the X-rays caused the glass to absorb the gas, causing the tube to generate "harder" X-rays until it soon stopped operating. Larger and more frequently used tubes were provided with devices for restoring the air, known as "softeners". These often took the form of a small side tube that contained a small piece of mica, a mineral that traps relatively large quantities of air within its structure. A small electrical heater heated the mica, causing it to release a small amount of air, thus restoring the tube's efficiency. However, the mica had a limited life, and the restoration process was difficult to control.

In 1904, John Ambrose Fleming invented the thermionic diode, the first kind of vacuum tube. This used a hot cathode that caused an electric current to flow in a vacuum. This idea was quickly applied to X-ray tubes, and hence heated-cathode X-ray tubes, called "Coolidge tubes", completely replaced the troublesome cold cathode tubes by about 1920.

In about 1906, the physicist Charles Barkla discovered that X-rays could be scattered by gases, and that each element had a characteristic X-ray spectrum. He won the 1917 Nobel Prize in Physics for this discovery.

In 1912, Max von Laue, Paul Knipping, and Walter Friedrich first observed the diffraction of X-rays by crystals. This discovery, along with the early work of Paul Peter Ewald, William Henry Bragg, and William Lawrence Bragg, gave birth to the field of X-ray crystallography.

In 1913, Henry Moseley performed crystallography experiments with X-rays emanating from various metals and formulated Moseley's law which relates the frequency of the X-rays to the atomic number of the metal.

The Coolidge X-ray tube was invented the same year by William D. Coolidge. It made possible the continuous emissions of X-rays. Modern X-ray tubes are based on this design, often employing the use of rotating targets which allow for significantly higher heat dissipation than static targets, further allowing higher quantity X-ray output for use in high-powered applications such as rotational CT scanners.

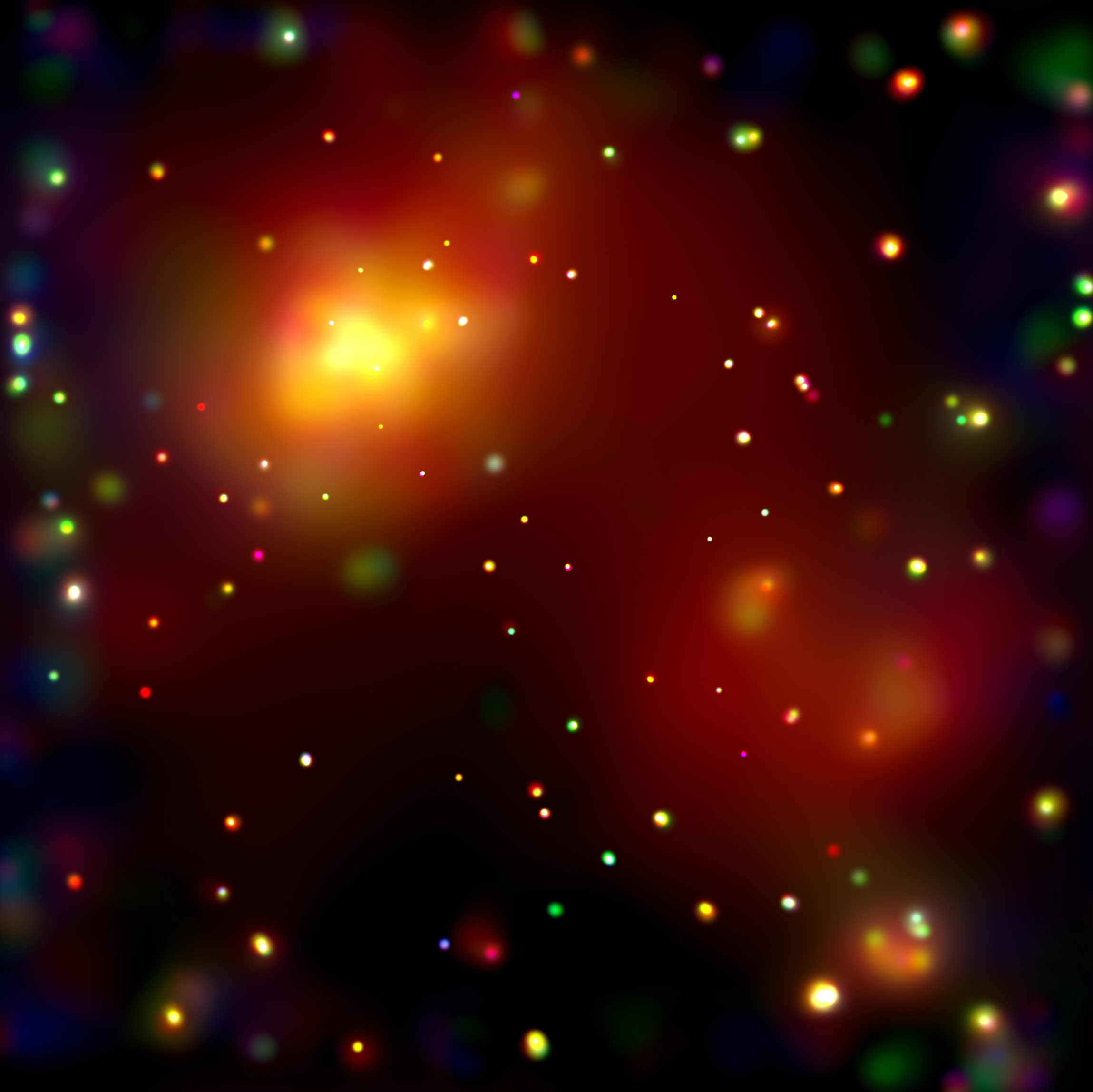
Chandra's image of the galaxy cluster Abell 2125 reveals a complex of several massive multimillion-degree-Celsius gas clouds in the process of merging.

The use of X-rays for medical purposes (which developed into the field of radiation therapy) was pioneered by Major John Hall-Edwards in Birmingham, England. Then in 1908, he had to have his left arm amputated because of the spread of X-ray dermatitis on his arm.

Medical science also used the motion picture to study human physiology. In 1913, a motion picture was made in Detroit showing a hard-boiled egg inside a human stomach. This early X-ray movie was recorded at a rate of one still image every four seconds. Dr Lewis Gregory Cole of New York was a pioneer of the technique, which he called "serial radiography". In 1918, X-rays were used in association with motion picture cameras to capture the human skeleton in motion. In 1920, it was used to record the movements of tongue and teeth in the study of languages by the Institute of Phonetics in England.

In 1914, Marie Curie developed radiological cars to support soldiers injured in World War I. The cars would allow for rapid X-ray imaging of wounded soldiers so battlefield surgeons could quickly and more accurately operate.

From the early 1920s through to the 1950s, X-ray machines were developed to assist in the fitting of shoes and were sold to commercial shoe stores. Concerns regarding the impact of frequent or poorly controlled use were expressed in the 1950s, leading to the practice's eventual decline. Canberra proposed a ban in 1957, while Switzerland prohibited the machines in 1989.

The X-ray microscope was developed during the late 1940s and early 1950s.

The Chandra X-ray Observatory, launched on July 23, 1999, has been allowing the exploration of the very violent processes in the universe that produce X-rays. Unlike visible light, which gives a relatively stable view of the universe, the X-ray universe is unstable. It features stars being torn apart by black holes, galactic collisions, and novae, and neutron stars that build up layers of plasma that then explode into space.

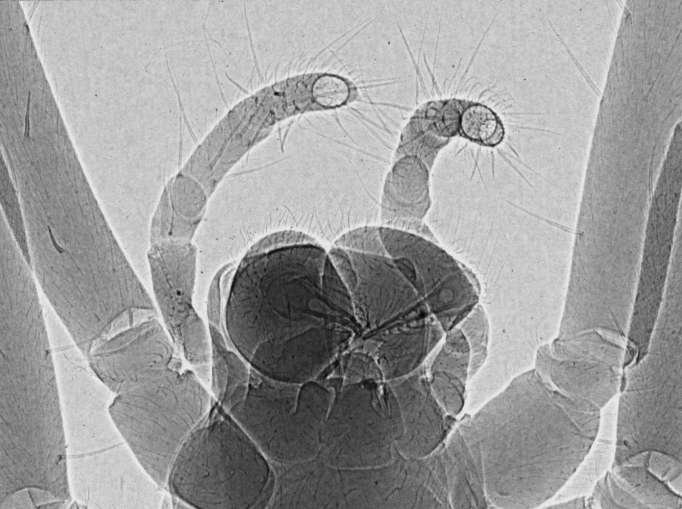
Phase-contrast X-ray image of a spider

An X-ray laser device was proposed as part of the Reagan Administration's Strategic Defense Initiative in the 1980s, but the only test of the device (a sort of laser "blaster" or death ray, powered by a thermonuclear explosion) gave inconclusive results. For technical and political reasons, the overall project (including the X-ray laser) was defunded (though was later revived by the second Bush Administration as National Missile Defense using different technologies).

Phase-contrast X-ray imaging refers to a variety of techniques that use phase information of an X-ray beam to form the image. Due to its good sensitivity to density differences, it is especially useful for imaging soft tissues. It has become an important method for visualizing cellular and histological structures in a wide range of biological and medical studies. There are several technologies being used for X-ray phase-contrast imaging, all using different principles to convert phase variations in the X-rays emerging from an object into intensity variations. These include propagation-based phase contrast, Talbot interferometry, refraction-enhanced imaging, and X-ray interferometry. These methods provide higher contrast compared to normal absorption-based X-ray imaging, making it possible to distinguish from each other details that have almost similar density. A disadvantage is that these methods require more sophisticated equipment, such as synchrotron or microfocus X-ray sources, X-ray optics, and high resolution X-ray detectors.

== Energy ranges ==
X-rays are part of the electromagnetic spectrum, with wavelengths shorter than UV light. Different applications use different parts of the X-ray spectrum.

=== Soft and hard X-rays ===
X-rays with high photon energies above 5–10 keV (below 0.2–0.1 nm wavelength) are called hard X-rays, while those with lower energy (and longer wavelength) are called soft X-rays. The intermediate range with photon energies of several keV is often referred to as tender X-rays. Due to their penetrating ability, hard X-rays are widely used to image the inside of objects (e.g. in medical radiography and airport security). The term X-ray is metonymically used to refer to a radiographic image produced using this method, in addition to the method itself. Since the wavelengths of hard X-rays are similar to the size of atoms, they are also useful for determining crystal structures by X-ray crystallography. By contrast, soft X-rays are easily absorbed in air; the attenuation length of 600 eV (~2 nm) X-rays in water is less than 1 micrometer.

=== Gamma rays ===
There is no consensus for a definition distinguishing between X-rays and gamma rays. One common practice is to distinguish between the two types of radiation based on their source: X-rays are emitted by electron deexcitation, while gamma rays are emitted by the decay of atomic nuclei. This definition has some limitations. For example, since there is overlap in the energy ranges of gamma and x-rays, if the origin of a photon is not known, it might not be clear what to classify the photon as. Another practice is to distinguish X- and gamma radiation on the basis of wavelength (or, equivalently, frequency or photon energy), with radiation shorter than some arbitrary wavelength, such as 10^{−11} m (0.1 Å), defined as gamma radiation. This criterion assigns a photon to an unambiguous category, but is only possible if wavelength is known. (Some measurement techniques do not distinguish between detected wavelengths.) However, these two definitions often coincide since the electromagnetic radiation emitted by X-ray tubes generally has a longer wavelength and lower photon energy than the radiation emitted by radioactive nuclei. Occasionally, one term or the other is used in specific contexts due to historical precedent, based on measurement (detection) technique, or based on their intended use rather than their wavelength or source. Thus, gamma-rays generated for medical and industrial uses, for example radiotherapy, in the ranges of 6–20 MeV, can in this context also be referred to as X-rays.

== Properties ==
Ionizing radiation hazard symbol

X-ray photons carry enough energy to ionize atoms and disrupt molecular bonds. This makes it a type of ionizing radiation, and therefore harmful to living tissue. A very high radiation dose over a short period of time causes burns and radiation sickness, while lower doses can give an increased risk of radiation-induced cancer. In medical imaging, this increased cancer risk is generally greatly outweighed by the benefits of the examination. The ionizing capability of X-rays can be used in cancer treatment to kill malignant cells using radiation therapy. It is also used for material characterization using X-ray spectroscopy.

Hard X-rays can traverse relatively thick objects without being much absorbed or scattered. For this reason, X-rays are widely used to image the inside of visually opaque objects. The most often seen applications are in medical radiography and airport security scanners, but similar techniques are also important in industry (e.g. industrial radiography and industrial CT scanning) and research (e.g. small animal CT). The penetration depth varies with several orders of magnitude over the X-ray spectrum. This allows the photon energy to be adjusted for the application so as to give sufficient transmission through the object and at the same time provide good contrast in the image.

X-rays have much shorter wavelengths than visible light, which makes it possible to probe structures much smaller than can be seen using a normal microscope. This property is used in X-ray microscopy to acquire high-resolution images, and also in X-ray crystallography to determine the positions of atoms in crystals.

== Interaction with matter ==
Attenuation length of X-rays in water showing the oxygen absorption edge at 540 eV, the energy^{−3} dependence of photoabsorption, as well as a leveling off at higher photon energies due to Compton scattering. The attenuation length is about four orders of magnitude longer for hard X-rays (right half) compared to soft X-rays (left half).

X-rays interact with matter in three main ways, through photoabsorption, Compton scattering, and Rayleigh scattering. The strength of these interactions depends on the energy of the X-rays and the elemental composition of the material, but not much on chemical properties, since the X-ray photon energy is much higher than chemical binding energies. Photoabsorption or photoelectric absorption is the dominant interaction mechanism in the soft X-ray regime and for the lower hard X-ray energies. At higher energies, Compton scattering dominates.

=== Photoelectric absorption ===
The probability of a photoelectric absorption per unit mass is approximately proportional to $Z^3/E^3$, where $Z$ is the atomic number and $E$ is the energy of the incident photon. This rule is not valid close to inner shell electron binding energies where there are abrupt changes in interaction probability, so called absorption edges. However, the general trend of high absorption coefficients and thus short penetration depths for low photon energies and high atomic numbers is very strong. For soft tissue, photoabsorption dominates up to about 26 keV photon energy where Compton scattering takes over. For higher atomic number substances, this limit is higher. The high amount of calcium ($Z=20$) in bones, together with their high density, is what makes them show up so clearly on medical radiographs.

A photoabsorbed photon transfers all its energy to the electron with which it interacts, thus ionizing the atom to which the electron was bound and producing a photoelectron that is likely to ionize more atoms in its path. An outer electron will fill the vacant electron position and produce either a characteristic X-ray or an Auger electron. These effects can be used for elemental detection through X-ray spectroscopy or Auger electron spectroscopy.

=== Compton scattering ===
Compton scattering is the predominant interaction between X-rays and soft tissue in medical imaging. Compton scattering is an inelastic scattering of the X-ray photon by an outer shell electron. Part of the energy of the photon is transferred to the scattering electron, thereby ionizing the atom and increasing the wavelength of the X-ray. The scattered photon can go in any direction, but a direction similar to the original direction is more likely, especially for high-energy X-rays. The probability for different scattering angles is described by the Klein–Nishina formula. The transferred energy can be directly obtained from the scattering angle from the conservation of energy and momentum.

=== Rayleigh scattering ===
Rayleigh scattering is the dominant elastic scattering mechanism in the X-ray regime. Inelastic forward scattering gives rise to the refractive index, which for X-rays is only slightly below 1.

== Production ==
Whenever charged particles (electrons or ions) of sufficient energy hit a material, X-rays are produced.

=== Production by electrons ===
Characteristic X-ray emission lines for some common anode materials.
Anode material	Atomic number	Photon energy [keV]		Wavelength [nm]	
Anode material	Atomic number	K_{α1}	K_{β1}	K_{α1}	K_{β1}
W	74	59.3	67.2	0.0209	0.0184
Mo	42	17.5	19.6	0.0709	0.0632
Cu	29	8.05	8.91	0.154	0.139
Ag	47	22.2	24.9	0.0559	0.0497
Ga	31	9.25	10.26	0.134	0.121
In	49	24.2	27.3	0.0512	0.0455
Al	13	1.4867	1.5574	0.8340	0.7961

Spectrum of the X-rays emitted by an X-ray tube with a rhodium target, operated at 60 kV. The smooth, continuous curve is due to bremsstrahlung, and the spikes are characteristic K lines for rhodium atoms.

X-rays can be generated by an X-ray tube, a vacuum tube that uses a high voltage to accelerate the electrons released by a hot cathode to a high velocity. The high velocity electrons collide with a metal target, the anode, creating the X-rays. In medical X-ray tubes the target is usually tungsten or a more crack-resistant alloy of rhenium (5%) and tungsten (95%), but sometimes molybdenum for more specialized applications, such as when softer X-rays are needed as in mammography. In crystallography, a copper target is most common, with cobalt often being used when fluorescence from iron content in the sample might otherwise present a problem. When even lower energies are needed, as in X-ray photoelectron spectroscopy, the K_{α} X-rays from an aluminium or magnesium target are often used.

The maximum energy of the produced X-ray photon is limited by the energy of the incident electron, which is equal to the voltage on the tube times the electron charge, so an 80 kV tube cannot create X-rays with an energy greater than 80 keV. When the electrons hit the target, X-rays are created by two different atomic processes:

1. Characteristic X-ray emission (X-ray electroluminescence): If the electron has enough energy, it can knock an orbital electron out of the inner electron shell of the target atom. After that, electrons from higher energy levels fill the vacancies, and X-ray photons are emitted. This process produces an emission spectrum of X-rays at a few discrete frequencies, sometimes referred to as spectral lines. Usually, these are transitions from the upper shells to the K shell (called K lines), to the L shell (called L lines) and so on. If the transition is from 2p to 1s, it is called Kα, while if it is from 3p to 1s it is Kβ. The frequencies of these lines depend on the material of the target and are therefore called characteristic lines. The Kα line usually has greater intensity than the Kβ one and is more desirable in diffraction experiments. Thus the Kβ line is filtered out by a filter. The filter is usually made of a metal having one proton less than the anode material (e.g. Ni filter for Cu anode or Nb filter for Mo anode).
2. Bremsstrahlung: This is radiation given off by the electrons as they are scattered by the strong electric field near the nuclei. These X-rays have a continuous spectrum. The frequency of Bremsstrahlung is limited by the energy of incident electrons.

So, the resulting output of a tube consists of a continuous Bremsstrahlung spectrum falling off to zero at the tube voltage, plus several spikes at the characteristic lines. The voltages used in diagnostic X-ray tubes range from roughly 20 kV to 150 kV and thus the highest energies of the X-ray photons range from roughly 20 keV to 150 keV.

Both of these X-ray production processes are inefficient, with only about one percent of the electrical energy used by the tube converted into X-rays, and thus most of the electric power consumed by the tube is released as waste heat. When producing a usable flux of X-rays, the X-ray tube must be designed to dissipate the excess heat.

A specialized source of X-rays which is becoming widely used in research is synchrotron radiation, which is generated by particle accelerators. Its unique features are X-ray outputs many orders of magnitude greater than those of X-ray tubes, wide X-ray spectra, excellent collimation, and linear polarization.

Short nanosecond bursts of X-rays peaking at 15 keV in energy may be reliably produced by peeling pressure-sensitive adhesive tape from its backing in a moderate vacuum. This is likely to be the result of recombination of electrical charges produced by triboelectric charging. The intensity of X-ray triboluminescence is sufficient for it to be used as a source for X-ray imaging.

=== Production by fast positive ions ===
X-rays can also be produced by fast protons or other positive ions. The proton-induced X-ray emission or particle-induced X-ray emission is widely used as an analytical procedure. For high energies, the production cross section is proportional to Z_{1}^{2}Z_{2}^{−4}, where Z_{1} refers to the atomic number of the ion, Z_{2} refers to that of the target atom. An overview of these cross sections is given in the same reference.

=== Production in lightning and laboratory discharges ===
X-rays are also produced in lightning accompanying terrestrial gamma-ray flashes. The underlying mechanism is the acceleration of electrons in lightning related electric fields and the subsequent production of photons through Bremsstrahlung. This produces photons with energies of some few keV and several tens of MeV. In laboratory discharges with a gap size of approximately 1 meter length and a peak voltage of 1 MV, X-rays with a characteristic energy of 160 keV are observed. A possible explanation is the encounter of two streamers and the production of high-energy run-away electrons; however, microscopic simulations have shown that the duration of electric field enhancement between two streamers is too short to produce a significant number of run-away electrons. Recently, it has been proposed that air perturbations in the vicinity of streamers can facilitate the production of run-away electrons and hence of X-rays from discharges.

== Detectors ==
X-ray detectors vary in shape and function depending on their purpose. Imaging detectors such as those used for radiography were originally based on photographic plates and later photographic film, but are now mostly replaced by various digital detector types such as image plates and flat panel detectors. For radiation protection direct exposure hazard is often evaluated using ionization chambers, while dosimeters are used to measure the radiation dose the person has been exposed to. X-ray spectra can be measured either by energy dispersive or wavelength dispersive spectrometers. For X-ray diffraction applications, such as X-ray crystallography, hybrid photon counting detectors are widely used.

== Medical uses ==
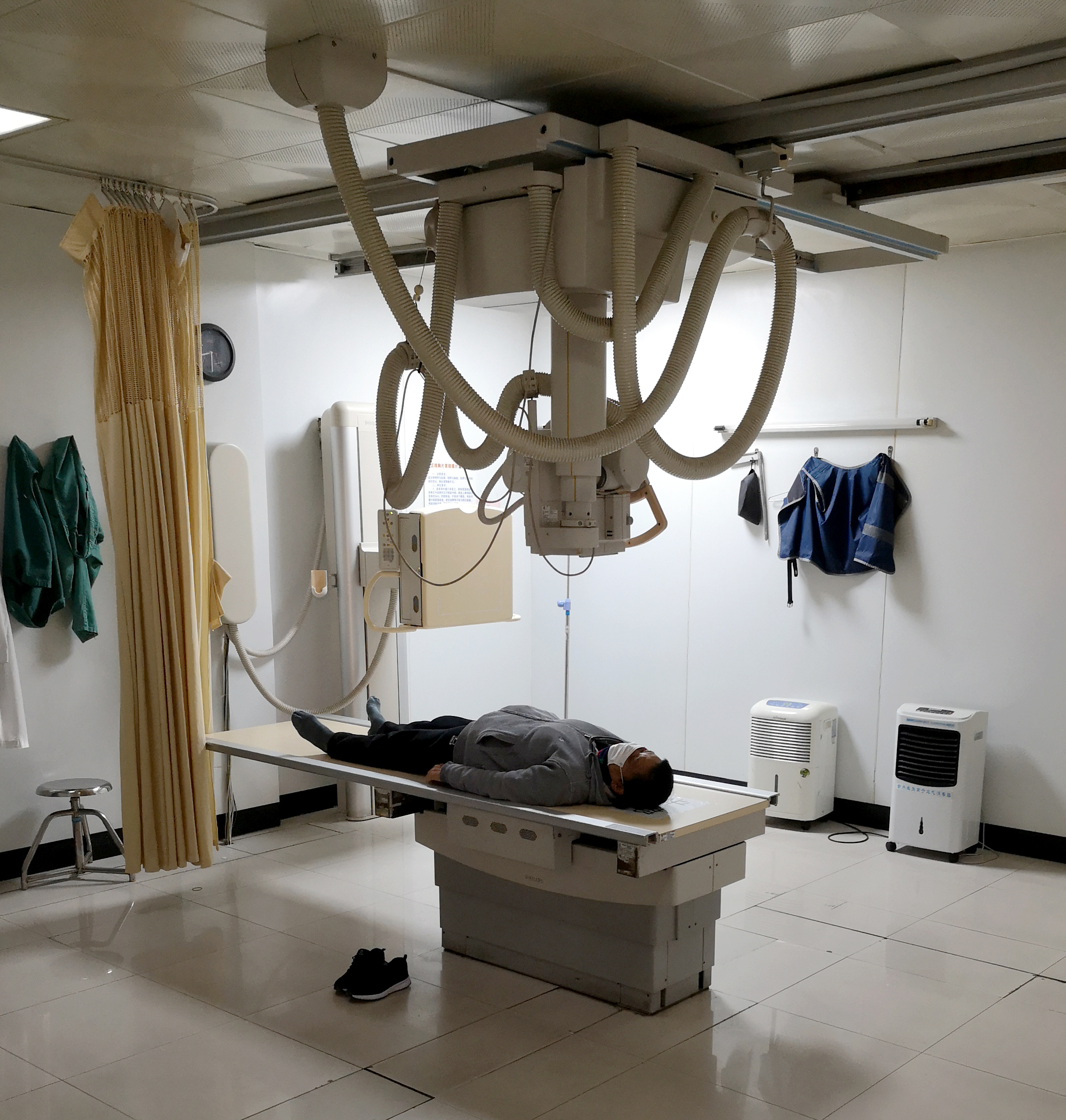
Patient undergoing an X-ray exam in a hospital radiology room

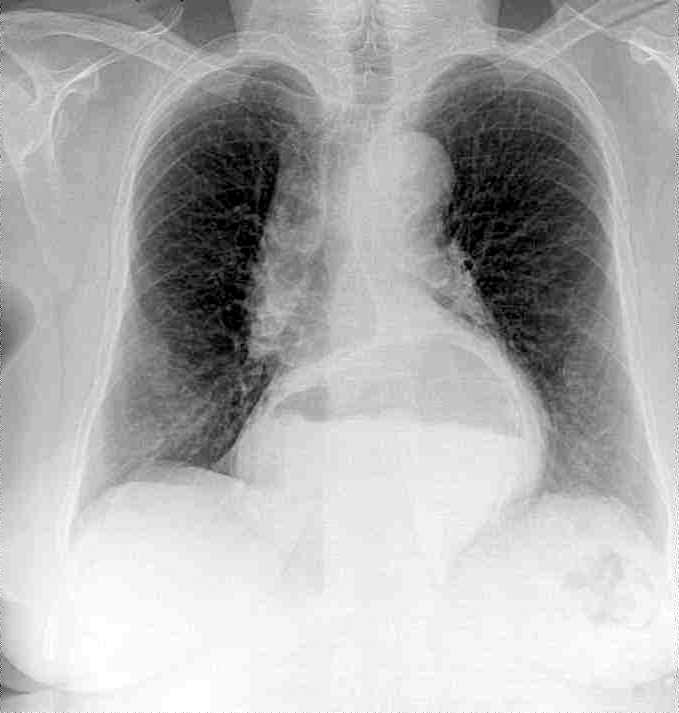
A chest radiograph of a female patient, demonstrating a hiatal hernia

Since Röntgen's discovery that X-rays can identify bone structures, X-rays have been used for medical imaging. The first medical use was less than a month after his paper on the subject. Up to 2010, five billion medical imaging examinations had been conducted worldwide. Radiation exposure from medical imaging in 2006 made up about 50% of total ionizing radiation exposure in the United States.

=== Projectional radiographs ===
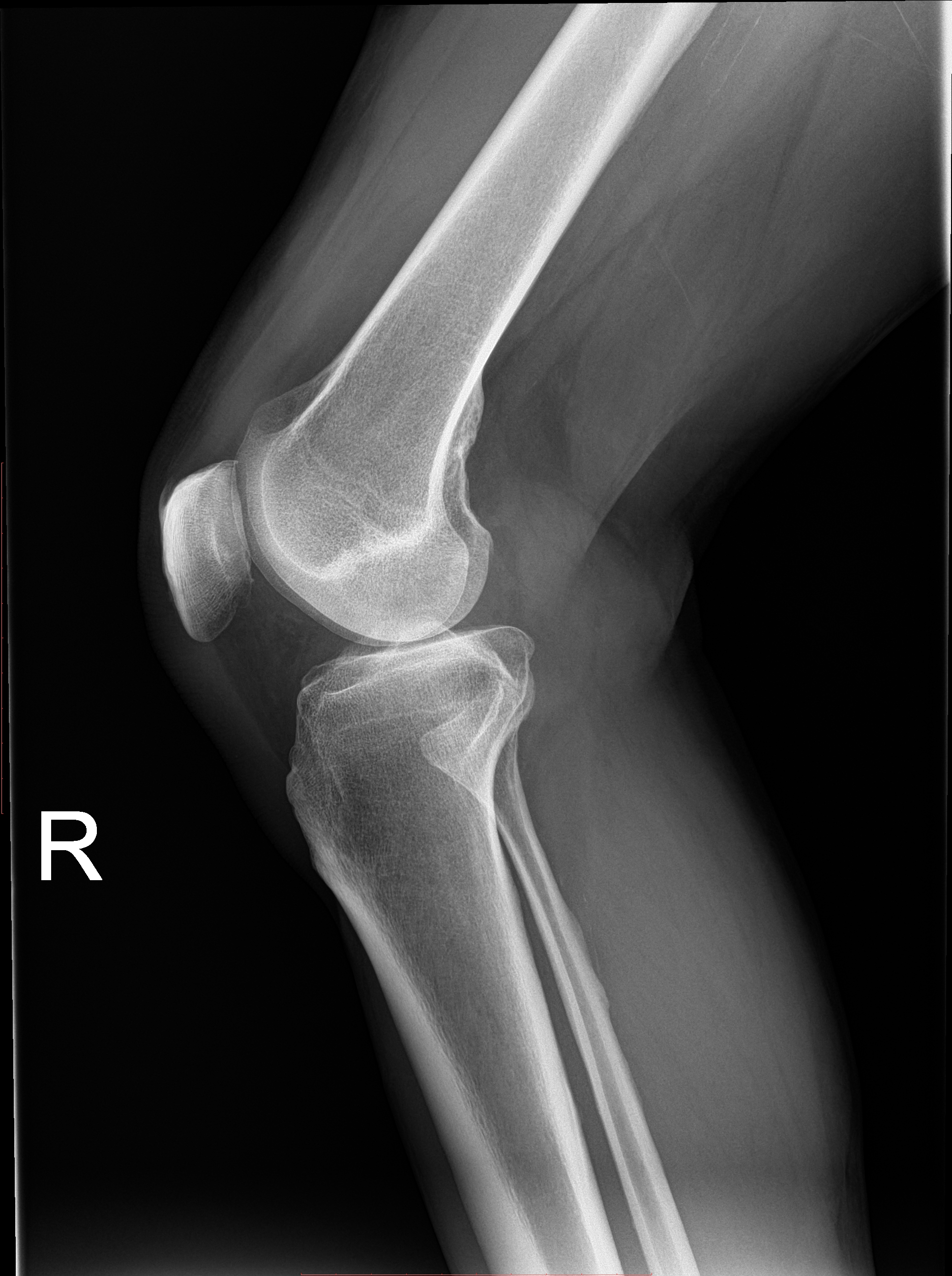
Plain radiograph of the right knee

Projectional radiography is the practice of producing two-dimensional images using X-ray radiation. Bones contain a high concentration of calcium, which, due to its relatively high atomic number, absorbs X-rays efficiently. This reduces the amount of X-rays reaching the detector in the shadow of the bones, making them clearly visible on the radiograph. The lungs and trapped gas also show up clearly because of lower absorption compared to tissue, while differences between tissue types are harder to see.

Projectional radiographs are useful in the detection of pathology of the skeletal system as well as for detecting some disease processes in soft tissue. Some notable examples are the very common chest X-ray, which can be used to identify lung diseases such as pneumonia, lung cancer, or pulmonary edema, and the abdominal x-ray, which can detect bowel (or intestinal) obstruction, free air (from visceral perforations), and free fluid (in ascites). X-rays may also be used to detect pathology such as gallstones (which are rarely radiopaque) or kidney stones which are often (but not always) visible. Traditional plain X-rays are less useful in the imaging of soft tissues such as the brain or muscle. One area where projectional radiographs are used extensively is in evaluating how an orthopedic implant, such as a knee, hip or shoulder replacement, is situated in the body with respect to the surrounding bone. This can be assessed in two dimensions from plain radiographs, or it can be assessed in three dimensions if a technique called '2D to 3D registration' is used. This technique purportedly negates projection errors associated with evaluating implant position from plain radiographs.

Dental radiography is commonly used in the diagnoses of common oral problems, such as cavities.

In medical diagnostic applications, the low energy (soft) X-rays are unwanted, since they are totally absorbed by the body, increasing the radiation dose without contributing to the image. Hence, a thin metal sheet, often of aluminium, called an X-ray filter, is usually placed over the window of the X-ray tube, absorbing the low energy part in the spectrum. This is called hardening the beam since it shifts the center of the spectrum towards higher energy (or harder) X-rays.

To generate an image of the cardiovascular system, including the arteries and veins (angiography) an initial image is taken of the anatomical region of interest. A second image is then taken of the same region after an iodinated contrast agent has been injected into the blood vessels within this area. These two images are then digitally subtracted, leaving an image of only the iodinated contrast outlining the blood vessels. The radiologist or surgeon then compares the image obtained to normal anatomical images to determine whether there is any damage or blockage of the vessel.

=== Computed tomography ===
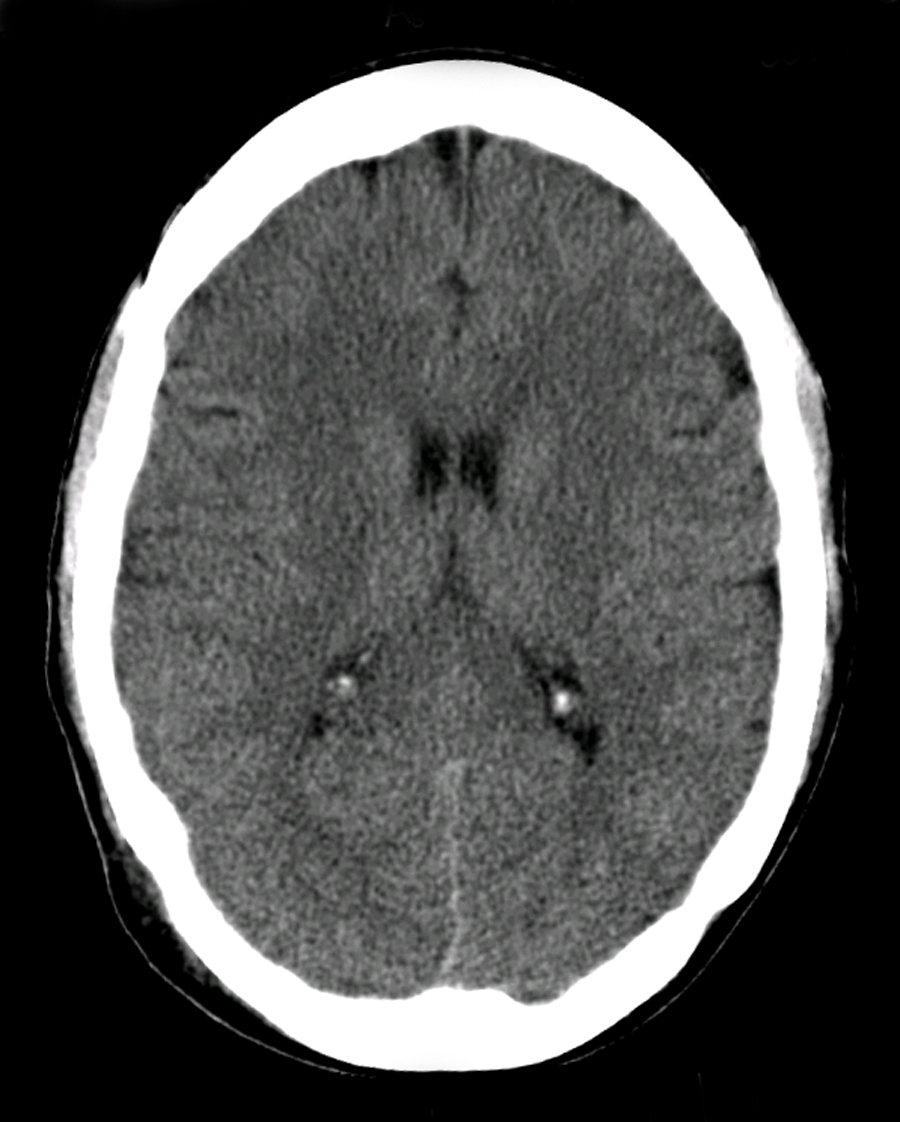
Head CT scan (transverse plane) slice – a modern application of medical radiography

Computed tomography (CT scanning) is a medical imaging modality where tomographic images or slices of specific areas of the body are obtained from a large series of two-dimensional X-ray images taken in different directions. These cross-sectional images can be combined into a three-dimensional image of the inside of the body. CT scans are a quicker and more cost effective imaging modality that can be used for diagnostic and therapeutic purposes in various medical disciplines.

=== Fluoroscopy ===
Fluoroscopy is an imaging technique commonly used by physicians or radiation therapists to obtain real-time moving images of the internal structures of a patient through the use of a fluoroscope. In its simplest form, a fluoroscope consists of an X-ray source and a fluorescent screen, between which a patient is placed. However, modern fluoroscopes couple the screen to an X-ray image intensifier and CCD video camera allowing the images to be recorded and played on a monitor. This method may use a contrast material. Examples include cardiac catheterization (to examine for coronary artery blockages), embolization procedures (to stop bleeding during hemorrhoidal artery embolization), and barium swallow (to examine for esophageal disorders and swallowing disorders). As of recent, modern fluoroscopy uses short bursts of x-rays, rather than a continuous beam, to effectively lower radiation exposure for both the patient and operator.

=== Radiotherapy ===
The use of X-rays as a treatment is known as radiation therapy and is largely used for the management (including palliation) of cancer; it requires higher radiation doses than those received for imaging alone. X-rays beams are used for treating skin cancers using lower energy X-ray beams while higher energy beams are used for treating cancers within the body such as brain, lung, prostate, and breast.

== Adverse effects ==
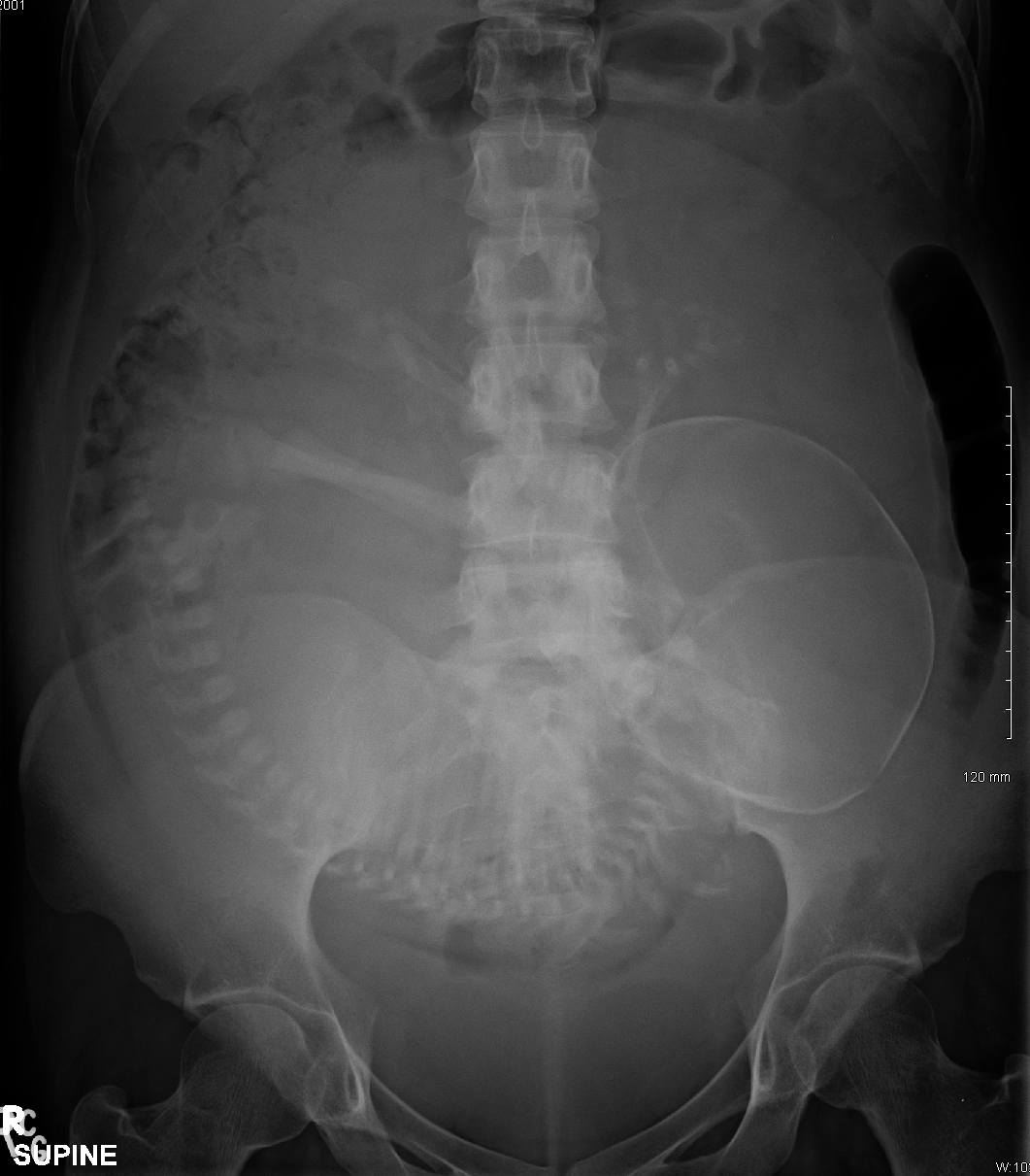
Abdominal radiograph of a pregnant woman

X-rays are a form of ionizing radiation, and are classified as a carcinogen by both the World Health Organization's International Agency for Research on Cancer and the U.S. government. Diagnostic X-rays (primarily from CT scans due to the large dose used) increase the risk of developmental problems and cancer in those exposed. It is estimated that 0.4% of current cancers in the United States are due to computed tomography (CT scans) performed in the past and that this may increase to as high as 1.5–2% with 2007 rates of CT usage.

Experimental and epidemiological data currently do not support the proposition that there is a threshold dose of radiation below which there is no increased risk of cancer. However, this is under increasing doubt. Cancer risk can start at the exposure of 1100 mGy. It is estimated that the additional radiation from diagnostic X-rays will increase the average person's cumulative risk of getting cancer by age 75 by 0.6–3.0%. The amount of absorbed radiation depends upon the type of X-ray test and the body part involved. CT and fluoroscopy entail higher doses of radiation than do plain X-rays.

To place the increased risk in perspective, a plain chest X-ray will expose a person to the same amount from background radiation that people are exposed to (depending upon location) every day over 10 days, while exposure from a dental X-ray is approximately equivalent to 1 day of environmental background radiation. Each such X-ray would add less than 1 per 1,000,000 to the lifetime cancer risk. An abdominal or chest CT would be the equivalent to 2–3 years of background radiation to the whole body, or 4–5 years to the abdomen or chest, increasing the lifetime cancer risk between 1 per 1,000 to 1 per 10,000. This is compared to the roughly 40% chance of a US citizen developing cancer during their lifetime. For instance, the effective dose to the torso from a CT scan of the chest is about 5 mSv, and the absorbed dose is about 14 mGy. A head CT scan (1.5 mSv, 64 mGy) that is performed once with and once without contrast agent, would be equivalent to 40 years of background radiation to the head. Accurate estimation of effective doses due to CT is difficult with the estimation uncertainty range of about ±19% to ±32% for adult head scans depending upon the method used.

The risk of radiation is greater to a fetus, so in pregnant patients, the benefits of the investigation (X-ray) should be balanced with the potential hazards to the fetus. If there is 1 scan in 9 months, it can be harmful to the fetus. Therefore, women who are pregnant get ultrasounds as their diagnostic imaging because this does not use radiation. If there is too much radiation exposure there could be harmful effects on the fetus or the reproductive organs of the mother. In the US, there are an estimated 62 million CT scans performed annually, including more than 4 million on children. Avoiding unnecessary X-rays (especially CT scans) reduces radiation dose and any associated cancer risk.

Medical X-rays are a significant source of human-made radiation exposure. In 1987, they accounted for 58% of exposure from human-made sources in the United States. Since human-made sources accounted for only 18% of the total radiation exposure, most of which came from natural sources (82%), medical X-rays only accounted for 10% of total American radiation exposure; medical procedures as a whole (including nuclear medicine) accounted for 14% of total radiation exposure. By 2006, however, medical procedures in the United States were contributing much more ionizing radiation than was the case in the early 1980s. In 2006, medical exposure constituted nearly half of the total radiation exposure of the U.S. population from all sources. The increase is traceable to the growth in the use of medical imaging procedures, in particular computed tomography (CT), and to the growth in the use of nuclear medicine.

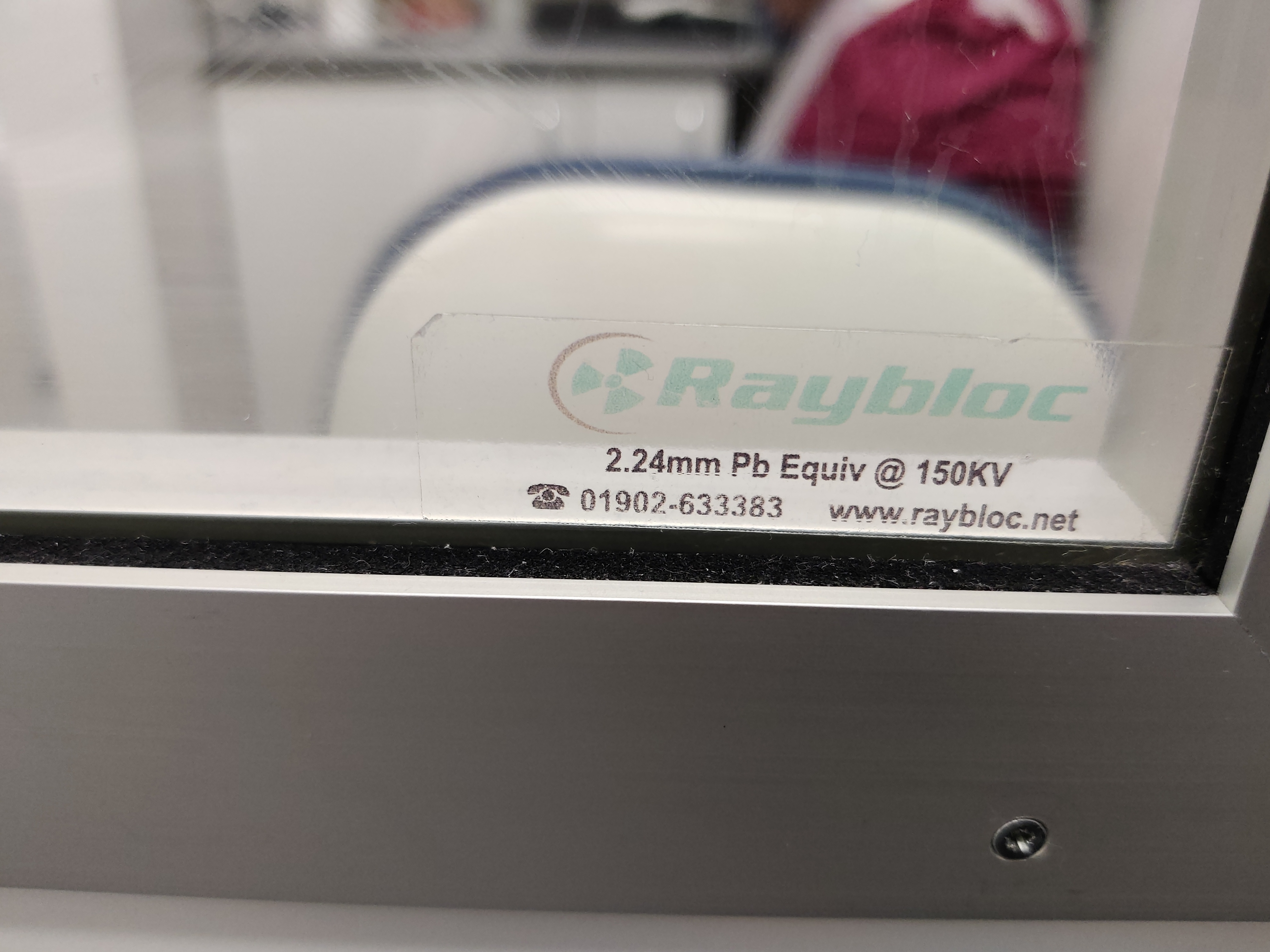
An X-ray protective window at Birmingham Dental Hospital, England. The maker's sticker states that it is equivalent to 2.24mm of lead at 150Kv.

Dosage due to dental X-rays varies significantly depending on the procedure and the technology (film or digital). Depending on the procedure and the technology, a single dental X-ray of a human results in an exposure of 5 to 40 μSv. A full mouth series of X-rays may result in an exposure of up to 60 (digital) to 180 (film) μSv, for a yearly average of up to 400 μSv.

Financial incentives have been shown to have a significant impact on X-ray use with doctors who are paid a separate fee for each X-ray providing more X-rays.

Early photon tomography or EPT (as of 2015) along with other techniques are being researched as potential alternatives to X-rays for imaging applications.

== Other uses ==
Other notable uses of X-rays include:

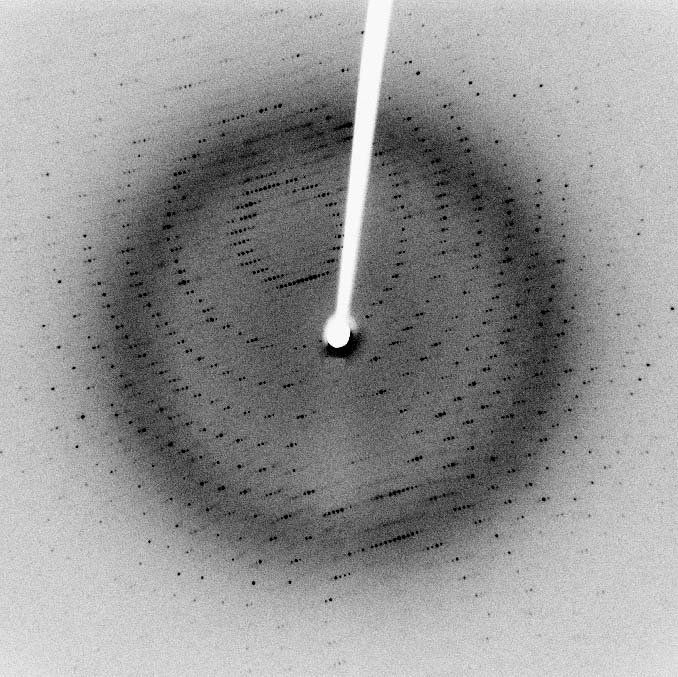
Each dot, called a reflection, in this diffraction pattern forms from the constructive interference of scattered X-rays passing through a crystal. The data can be used to determine the crystalline structure.

- X-ray crystallography in which the pattern produced by the diffraction of X-rays through the closely spaced lattice of atoms in a crystal is recorded and then analysed to reveal the nature of that lattice. A related technique, fiber diffraction, was used by Rosalind Franklin to discover the double helical structure of DNA.
- X-ray astronomy, an observational branch of astronomy that studies X-ray emission from celestial objects.
- X-ray microscopic analysis, which uses electromagnetic radiation in the soft X-ray band to produce images of very small objects.
- X-ray fluorescence, a phenomenon that occurs when a sample is hit with high-energy X-rays. The sample fluoresces with a radiation profile that is characteristic of its atomic makeup. This provides a means for non-destructive analysis of many different things.
- X-ray photoelectron spectroscopy is a chemical analysis technique relying on the photoelectric effect, usually employed in surface science.
- Industrial radiography uses X-rays for inspection of industrial parts, particularly welds.
- Radiography of cultural objects, most often X-rays of paintings to reveal underdrawing, pentimenti alterations in the course of painting or by later restorers, and sometimes previous paintings on the support. Many pigments such as lead white show well in radiographs.

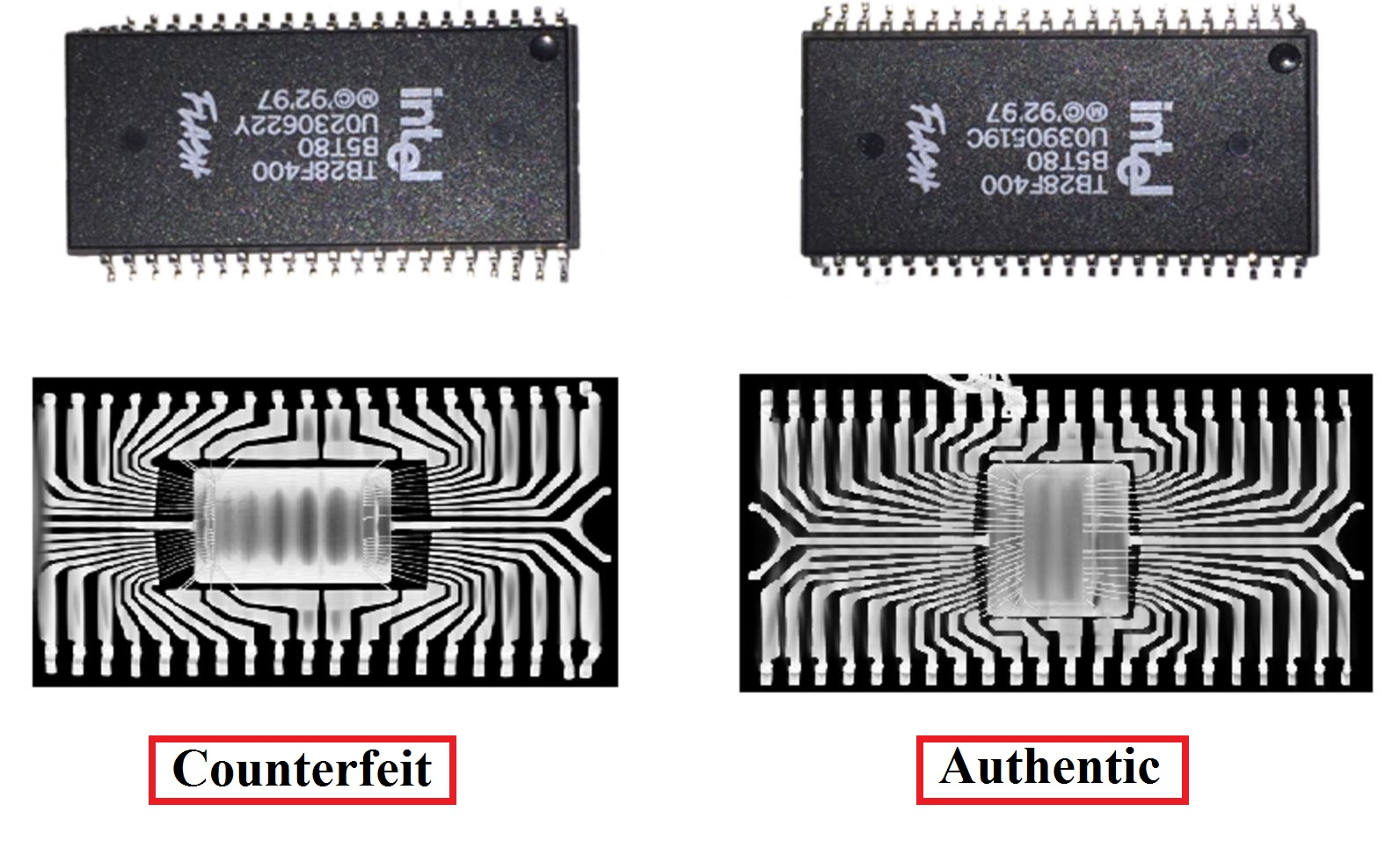
Using X-ray for inspection and quality control: the differences in the structures of the die and bond wires reveal the left chip to be counterfeit.

- Automated X-ray inspection is the use of X-rays for authentication and quality control of packaged items. It can also be used to identify foreign material in foods and pharmaceuticals.
- Industrial CT (computed tomography), a process that uses X-ray equipment to produce three-dimensional representations of components both externally and internally. This is accomplished through computer processing of projection images of the scanned object in many directions.
- Airport security luggage scanners use X-rays for inspecting the interior of luggage for security threats before loading on aircraft.
- Border control truck scanners and domestic police departments use X-rays for inspecting the interior of trucks.

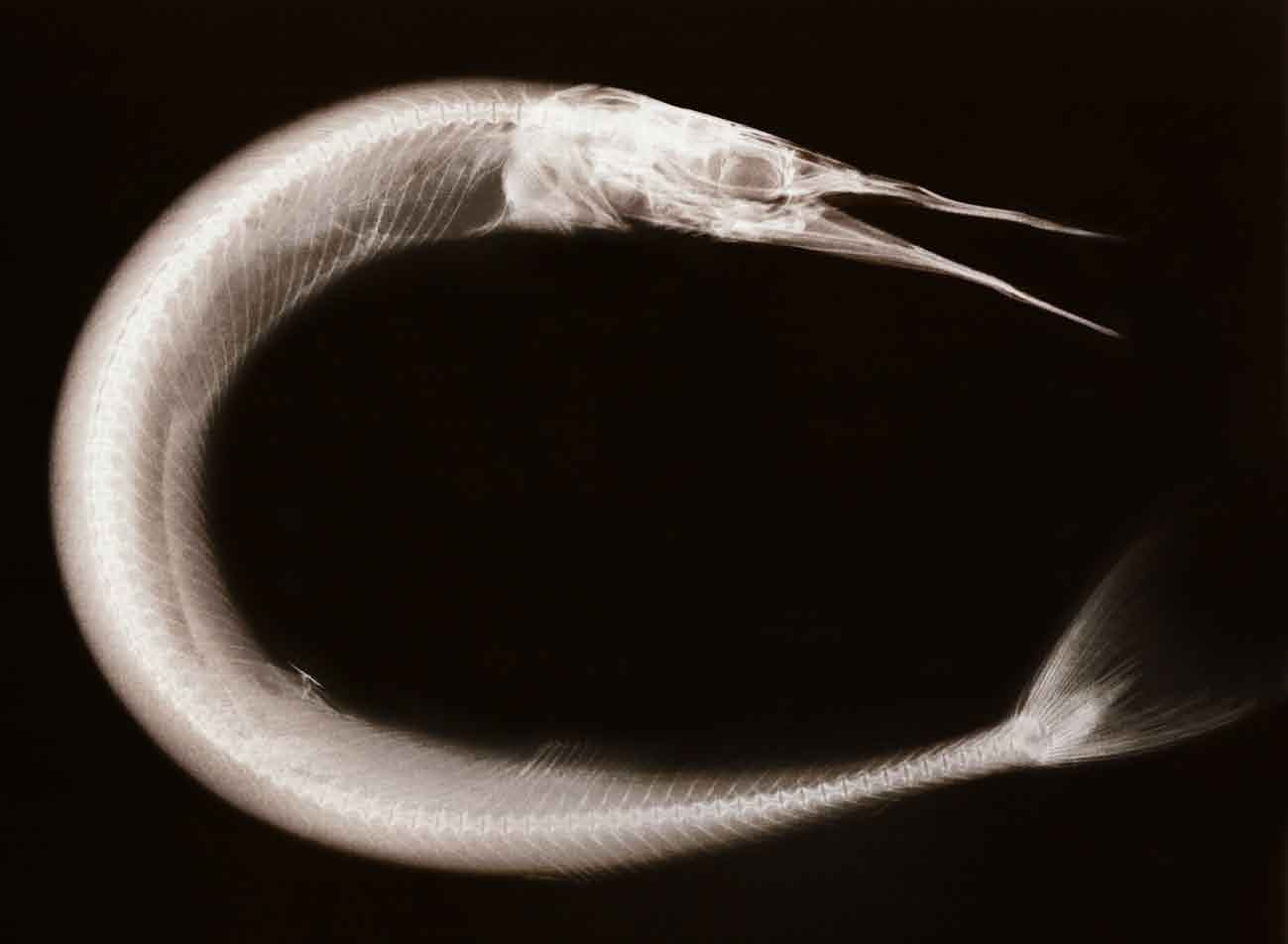
X-ray fine art photography of needlefish by Peter Dazeley

- X-ray art and fine art photography, an artistic use of X-rays, for example works by artists such as Stane Jagodič or Peter Dazeley.
- X-ray hair removal, a method popular in the 1920s but now banned by the FDA.
- Shoe-fitting fluoroscopes were popularized in the 1920s, banned in the US in the 1960s, in the UK in the 1970s, and later in continental Europe.
- Roentgen stereophotogrammetry is used to track movement of bones based on the implantation of markers
- In thermonuclear weapon design, radiation implosion is the process through which high energy X-rays generated from a fission explosion (primary) compress nuclear fuel to the point of fusion ignition (secondary).

== Visibility ==
While they fall outside of the wavelengths that compose the visible light spectrum, in special circumstances X-rays can be detected by eye. Brandes, in an experiment a short time after Röntgen's landmark 1895 paper, reported after dark adaptation and placing his eye close to an X-ray tube, seeing a faint "blue-gray" glow which seemed to originate within the eye itself. Upon hearing this, Röntgen reviewed his record books and found he too had seen the effect. When placing an X-ray tube on the opposite side of a wooden door Röntgen had noted the same blue glow, seeming to emanate from the eye itself, but thought his observations to be spurious because he only saw the effect when he used one type of tube. Later he realized that the tube which had created the effect was the only one powerful enough to make the glow plainly visible and the experiment was thereafter readily repeatable. The knowledge that X-rays are actually faintly detectable to the dark-adapted naked eye has largely been forgotten today; this is probably due to the desire not to repeat what would now be seen as a recklessly dangerous and potentially harmful experiment with ionizing radiation. It is not known what exact mechanism in the eye produced the visibility described by Röntgen and Brandes, though Cherenkov radiation caused by the X-rays traveling through the vitreous humor of the eye is a likely explanation. Other potential explanations for the glow include direct excitation of retinal cells by X-rays, similar to some instances of light flashes seen during experiments regarding cosmic ray visual phenomena.

External image
- X-ray–induced air ionization at the ESRF wiggler

Though X-rays are otherwise invisible, it is possible to see the ionization of the air molecules if the intensity of the X-ray beam is high enough. The beamline from the wiggler at the European Synchrotron Radiation Facility is one example of such high intensity.

== Units of measure and exposure ==
The measure of X-rays ionizing ability is called the exposure:

- The coulomb per kilogram (C/kg) is the SI unit of ionizing radiation exposure, and it is the amount of radiation required to create one coulomb of charge of each polarity in one kilogram of matter.
- The roentgen (R) is an obsolete traditional unit of exposure, which represented the amount of radiation required to create one electrostatic unit of charge of each polarity in one cubic centimeter of dry air. 1 roentgen = 2.58×10^{−4} C/kg.

However, the effect of ionizing radiation on matter (especially living tissue) is more closely related to the amount of energy deposited into them rather than the charge generated. This measure of energy absorbed is called the absorbed dose:

- The gray (Gy), which has units of (joules/kilogram), is the SI unit of absorbed dose, and it is the amount of radiation required to deposit one joule of energy in one kilogram of any kind of matter.
- The rad is the (obsolete) corresponding traditional unit, equal to 10 millijoules of energy deposited per kilogram. 100 rad = 1 gray.

The equivalent dose is the measure of the biological effect of radiation on human tissue. For X-rays it is equal to the absorbed dose.

- The Roentgen equivalent man (rem) is the traditional unit of equivalent dose. For X-rays it is equal to the rad, or, in other words, 10 millijoules of energy deposited per kilogram. 100 rem = 1 Sv.
- The sievert (Sv) is the SI unit of equivalent dose, and also of effective dose. For X-rays the "equivalent dose" is numerically equal to a Gray (Gy). 1 Sv = 1 Gy. For the "effective dose" of X-rays, it is usually not equal to the Gray (Gy).

Ionizing radiation related quantities
Quantity	Unit	Symbol	Derivation	Year	SI equivalent
Activity (A)	becquerel	Bq	s^{−1}	1974	SI unit
Activity (A)	curie	Ci	3.7×10^{10} s^{−1}	1953	3.7×10^{10} Bq
Activity (A)	rutherford	Rd	10^{6} s^{−1}	1946	1000000 Bq
Exposure (X)	coulomb per kilogram	C/kg	C⋅kg^{−1} of air	1974	SI unit
Exposure (X)	röntgen	R	esu / 0.001293 g of air	1928	2.58×10^{−4} C/kg
Absorbed dose (D)	gray	Gy	J⋅kg^{−1}	1974	SI unit
Absorbed dose (D)	erg per gram	erg/g	erg⋅g^{−1}	1950	1.0×10^{−4} Gy
Absorbed dose (D)	rad	rad	100 erg⋅g^{−1}	1953	0.010 Gy
Equivalent dose (H)	sievert	Sv	J⋅kg^{−1} × W_{R}	1977	SI unit
Equivalent dose (H)	röntgen equivalent man	rem	100 erg⋅g^{−1} × W_{R}	1971	0.010 Sv
Effective dose (E)	sievert	Sv	J⋅kg^{−1} × W_{R} × W_{T}	1977	SI unit
Effective dose (E)	röntgen equivalent man	rem	100 erg⋅g^{−1} × W_{R} × W_{T}	1971	0.010 Sv

== See also ==
- Backscatter X-ray – Advanced X-ray imaging technology
- Neutron radiation – Ionizing radiation that presents as free neutrons
- NuSTAR – NASA X-ray space telescope of the Explorer program
- Radiographer – Healthcare professional
- Resonant inelastic X-ray scattering – Advanced X-ray spectroscopy technique
- Small-angle X-ray scattering – Radiation scattering technique
- X-ray absorption spectroscopy – Synchrotron radiation-based spectroscopy
- X-ray reflectivity – Surface analytical technique
- X-ray vision – Fictional superpower
- X-ray welding – Welding using heat from X-ray
