= Association of Photographers =

- Abbreviation: AOP
- Formation: 1968
- Legal status: Not-for-profit company
- Purpose: Industry support for professional photographers, predominantly in the UK, although with overseas reach.
- Location: 2nd Floor, 201 Haverstock Hill, London, NW3 4QG, United Kingdom (Admin only)
- Region served: UK/Europe
- Members: Professional photographers, assisting photographers and associates
- Executive Officer: Isabelle Doran
- Website: www.the-aop.org

The Association of Photographers (AOP) is a trade association for British and European professional photographers predominantly, but also has members based globally.

== History ==
It was formed in London in 1968 as the Association of Fashion and Advertising Photographers by a small group of photographers (later joined by editorial photographers to become AFAEP). United by a common aim to challenge the then unreasonable demands of model agencies, it brought together professional photographers in order to protect their rights and promote photography.

== Structure ==
Constituted as a not-for-profit trade association, today its membership is around 3,000 members representing professional photographers, assisting photographers and image-makers. It is also supported by over 30 photographers' agents, alongside industry service-providers, printers, manufacturers and suppliers of photographic equipment. The AOP also has 32 affiliated courses at HE and FE level and plays a role in promoting, maintaining and developing relationships between all levels of higher and further education and the professional industry.

It has an administrative office (only) at 2nd Floor, 201 Haverstock Hill, London, NW3 4QG, United Kingdom. All staff work remotely across the UK.

== Function ==
It negotiated the reforms which led to the Copyright, Designs and Patents Act 1988, as well as developed the AOP standards of practice, which afford photographers greater protection and control of their work; and wrote Beyond the Lens, the guide to rights, ethics and best business practice in professional photography.

The Association publishes information of particular interest to photographers concerned with their intellectual property rights and business practice.

Today, the Association is engaged with policy matters for photographers, image-makers, and related creative service providers, on issues affecting their livelihoods, which includes fair pay and contracts, enforcement of IP rights, such as copyright, and generative-AI.

=== Awards ===
It also created the AOP Awards, an awards programme for AOP members, It covers Professional, Assisting Photographer & Student photography. In addition, the AOP runs a competition that is open to all photographers. All the winning images from each of the awards are published in a corresponding book and all images are exhibited at a London venue after the winners have been announced.

=== Publications ===
The AOP produces and publishes a book, titled Beyond the Lens.

== Past presidents ==
Past presidents of the Association of Photographers (the role was referred to as chairman)

- 1968–1969 Ray Harwood
- 1969–1970 Michael Boys
- 1970–1971 Anthony Blake
- 1971–1972 Anthony Blake
- 1972–1973 Philip Modica
- 1974–1975 Philip Modica
- 1975–1976 Christopher Joyce
- 1976–1977 Christopher Joyce
- 1977–1978 Max Forsythe
- 1978–1979 Max Forsythe
- 1979–1980 Alan Brooking
- 1980–1981 Alan Brooking
- 1981–1982 Alan Brooking
- 1982–1983 Bryce Attwell
- 1983–1984 Bryce Attwell
- 1984–1985 John Timbers
- 1985–1986 Robert Golden
- 1986–1987 Geoffrey Frosh
- 1987–1988 Rob Brimson
- 1988–1989 Rob Brimson
- 1989–1990 Mike Laye
- 1990–1991 Alan Brooking / Bob Harris
- 1991–1992 Bob Harris
- 1992–1993 Bob Harris
- 1993–1994 Clive Frost / Max Forsythe (Interim Chairman)
- 1994–1995 Martin Beckett
- 1995–1996 Michael Harding
- 1996–1997 Michael Harding
- 1997–1998 Tessa Codrington
- 1998–1999 Sandra Lousada
- 1999–2000 Derek Seaward
- 2000–2001 Adam Woolfitt
- 2001–2002 Grant Smith
- 2002–2003 Grant Smith
- 2003–2004 Anthony Marsland
- 2004–2005 Anthony Marsland
- 2005–2006 Michael Harding
- 2006–2007 Michael Harding
- 2007–2008 Richard Maxted
- 2008–2009 Martin Brent
- 2009–2010 Simon Leach
- 2019–present Tim Flach
