= Sky marshal =

Covert law enforcement or counter-terrorist agent

A sky marshal is an undercover law enforcement or counterterrorism personnel on board a commercial aircraft to counter aircraft hijackings. Such personnel are also known as air marshals, flight marshals, and aviation safety officers or an in-flight security officer. Sky marshals may be provided by airlines such as El Al (who provide sky marshals on every flight), or by government agencies such as the Austrian Einsatzkommando Cobra, Royal Canadian Mounted Police, China Air Marshal Command, German Federal Police, National Security Guard in India, Metropolitan Police MO19 (Specialist Firearms Command) from London, Pakistan Airports Security Force, or US Federal Air Marshal Service.

== History ==
The history of in-flight security began in March 1971 when the US Federal Aviation Administration (FAA) directed a program to combat airplane hijackings. In that same year, numerous airplane hijackings in the United States were planned with the ultimate aim to fly to Cuba. In response, the FAA created the title of FAA peace officer. FAA peace officers were the first people to provide armed security on board commercial aircraft.

=== Australia ===
In response to the September 11 attacks, the commonwealth instituted an air security officer (ASO) program under the Australian Federal Police in December 2001. These officers are generally referred to in the media as "sky marshals". The ASO Program provides a discreet anti-hijacking capability for Australian civil aviation by putting armed security personnel on board aircraft. This involves both random and intelligence-led placement of armed ASOs on flights operated by Australian-registered air carriers, on both domestic and international flights.

Officers are armed, trained, and equipped for a variety of situations on both domestic and international flights.

=== Austria ===
In Austria, armed air marshals have been provided since 1981 by the Einsatzkommando Cobra.

=== Canada ===
The Canadian Air Carrier Protection/Protective Program (CACPP) began on September 17, 2002, when a memorandum of understanding was signed between the Royal Canadian Mounted Police with Transport Canada, the authority responsible for Canadian aviation security, and the Canadian Air Transport Security Authority (CATSA), for the implementation and administration of the CACPP. The program is conducted by specially trained undercover armed RCMP officers (known as "aircraft protective officers" – APOs) on selected domestic and international flights and all flights to Ronald Reagan Washington National Airport in the United States. Pilots and flight attendants are advised of their presence, and the officer is authorized to physically intervene should an unauthorized person attempt to gain control of an aircraft. APOs, however, will not get involved in controlling unruly passengers. While they are peace officers within Canadian territories, they rely on section 6(2) of the Tokyo Convention as a legal basis for intervening in an incident outside of Canadian airspace. By law, such officers are exempt from acquiring a permit for importing or exporting their duty firearms when crossing the border. However, the exact nature of their weaponry is not released to the public except they are "deadly and effective and should not damage the aircraft". The Canadian Forces Military Police members of the Canadian Forces Air Marshal Detail, are responsible for providing security to Canadian forces aircraft, crew and passengers – passengers who may include the governor general, the prime minister and members of the royal family.

=== China ===
China began having air marshals known as "Aviation Safety Officers" (航空安全员) on flights in 1973. In 1987, the State Council of China approved the establishment of private Aviation Safety Officer units by airlines. In 2004, the China Air Marshal Command (中国民航空中警察总队) was established as an added name of the Civil Air Administration of China, with 1,200 Aviation Safety Officers being sworn in as People's Police air marshals while 800 additional officers were transferred from local Public Security Bureaus.

Currently, both Aviation Safety Officers and Air Marshals exist and are both responsible for law enforcement and anti-terrorism on flights; however, Aviation Safety Officers are employees of the airline while Air Marshals are sworn People's Police officers, and are legally considered civil employees. Additionally, Aviation Safety Officers can also have additional duties to assist flight attendants while Air Marshals are solely focused on law enforcement.

=== India ===
Sky marshals were introduced by Indian Airlines in December 1999, following the hijacking of Indian Airlines Flight 814 in Kandahar. Following the September 11 attacks, private operators like Air Sahara also introduced sky marshals on some flights and stated plans to increase these.

In 2003, Air India had an agreement with the US directive to have air marshals on all of its US-bound flights. They are recruited from India's elite commando force National Security Guard. Ipsita Biswas of India's Terminal Ballistics Research Laboratory (TBRL) were developing frangible bullets which shatter if they hit a substance that is harder than the bullet is. The application would allow their sky marshals to use these bullets to shoot, or threaten to shoot, hijackers on board aircraft, with the assurance that the aircraft itself would not suffer substantial damage.

=== Ireland ===
Ireland does not have a dedicated sky marshal agency, although there is a National Civil Aviation Security Committee (NCASC). Limited capabilities are provided by the Garda Síochána emergency response unit (ERU), the national police armed tactical unit, and backup may be provided by the counter-terrorism the Garda Special Detective Unit (SDU) and the Army Ranger Wing (ARW) special forces unit in certain situations.

The Irish government allows armed flight marshals from the United Kingdom, United States, Canada, Israel, Australia, and specific European Union countries on board international flights landing from or destined for those countries in Irish airspace, once they are informed of their presence beforehand. Weapons carried by an air marshal in Ireland include a concealed handgun, taser, knife, and pepper spray.

=== Israel ===
Undercover agents carrying concealed firearms sit among the passengers on every international El Al flight. Most El Al pilots are former Israeli Air Force pilots. (Note: Most, but not all, El Al's pilots are former pilots of the Israeli Air Force. An article dedicated to an El Al female captain can be found at "With Yom Haatzmaut Festivities, a Gender Barrier Is Broken", The Sisterhood, The Forward.) The cockpits in all El Al aircraft have double doors to prevent entry by unauthorized persons. A code is required to access the doors, and the second door will open only after the first has closed and the person has been identified by the captain or first officer. Furthermore, reinforced steel floors separate the passenger cabin from the baggage hold.

In April 2013, the Israeli government increased payments to El Al to secure 97.5% of the airline's security costs ahead of the Open Skies agreement to take effect in 2014 with the European Union.

=== Japan ===
A Sky Marshal program began operating in Japan in December 2004, in response to heightened aviation security concerns following the September 11 attacks. Japanese Sky Marshals are serving police officers deployed aboard aircraft to prevent and respond to hijackings. The program is operated by the National Police Agency in cooperation with the Ministry of Land, Infrastructure, Transport and Tourism and Japanese airlines. The extent and size of the program are not publicly disclosed, and details concerning the officers, their deployment, weapons, and the flights on which they operate are withheld for security reasons.

=== Pakistan ===
In Pakistan, armed sky marshals are deployed on all flights. Sky marshals are provided by Airports Security Force (ASF). The ASF was established in 1976 under the Airports Security Force Act LXXVII of 1975, initially as a directorate within the Department of Civil Aviation. After the hijacking of a Pakistan International Airlines aircraft in March 1981, sensing the contradictory requirements of security and facilitation, the ASF was separated, and, in December 1983, was placed under the folds of the Ministry of Defence.

=== Singapore ===
Singapore Airlines deploys sky marshals on its flights. Such members are armed with firearms loaded with special ammunition and dart-firing stun guns. Members are usually from either the air marshal unit, the security command, or the special tactics and rescue (STAR) of the Singapore Police Force. Members have undergone extensive training to enable them to operate effectively within the confines of an aircraft.

=== United Kingdom ===
An armed Air Marshal program began operating in the United Kingdom in 2002, it was in response to growing threats to civilian passenger aircraft. The Metropolitan Police Service Specialist Firearms Command SO19 is tasked with operating the Aircraft Protection Operations (APO) Program, to which all UK Air Marshals report. The extent and size of the program are relatively unknown, as few details are released to the media due to the sensitivity of the operation.

=== United States ===
The US Federal Aviation Administration began its sky marshal program in 1968, which eventually became the FAA Federal Air Marshal Program, in 1982; the program later became the Federal Air Marshal Service in January 2002 and after the handover of FAA security duties to the Transportation Security Administration. In 2005, Rigoberto Alpizar was shot dead by two sky marshals on a jetway at Miami International Airport. Currently, federal air marshal officers are under the Transportation Security Administration. Under the Visible Intermodal Prevention Response (VIPR) system, started around 2005, federal air marshals began to patrol non-aviation sites like bus terminals and train stations.

== Fictional references ==
- The air marshal played by Peter Sarsgaard is a central character in the suspense thriller Flightplan, starring Jodie Foster, Erika Christensen and Sean Bean.
- In the movie Non-Stop, the plot revolves around a US air marshal (Liam Neeson) who is accused of killing passengers while en route from New York to London.
- In Harold & Kumar Escape from Guantanamo Bay, a US Marshal and his colleague subdue Harold and Kumar after they make threats on board a plane. The plane returns to the US, and the two are handed over to the Federal police.
- In 2021 Netflix action horror film Blood Red Sky, terrorists aboard the fictional Transatlantic Flight 473 from Berlin to New York kill three German Bundespolizei air marshals and use their sidearms to take control of the plane.
- In the 2025 Indian Malayalam-language action thriller film Identity, a Sky Marshal plays a pivotal role in thwarting a high-stakes hijacking, showcasing the critical responsibilities of these covert aviation security officers.

== See also ==
- Air marshal (rank)
- Dawson's Field hijackings
- Infrastructure security
- Unruly aircraft passenger
