= Federal Air Marshal Service =

United States federal law enforcement agency

Transportation Security Administration Office of Law Enforcement/Federal Air Marshal Service
- The insignia of the parent agency, the TSA

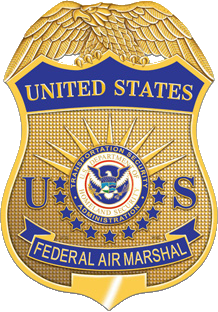
- The badge of the Federal Air Marshal Service

- Flag of the parent agency, the Transportation Security Administration
- Common name: Federal Air Marshal Service
- Abbreviation: OLE/FAMS or FAMS
- Motto: Invisus, Inauditus, Impavidus (English: "Unseen, Unheard, Unafraid")

Agency overview
- Formed: March 2, 1962
- Annual budget: $805 million (2014)

Jurisdictional structure
- Federal agency (Operations jurisdiction): United States
- Operations jurisdiction: United States
- Legal jurisdiction: Transportation systems
- General nature: Federal law enforcement; Civilian police
- Specialist jurisdictions: Counter terrorism, special weapons operations; protection of internationally protected persons, other very important persons, or state property; Protection of international or domestic VIPs, protection of significant state assets

Operational structure
- Federal Air Marshals: 3,000 (estimated)
- Parent agency executives responsible: David P. Cummins, Administrator of the Transportation Security Administration; Adam Stahl, Acting Deputy Administrator of the Transportation Security Administration
- Agency executives: Brian C. Belcher, Executive Assistant Administrator/Director; William Csontos, Assistant Administrator
- Parent agency: Transportation Security Administration
- Programs: List: Visible Intermodal Prevention and Response; Federal Flight Deck Officer
- Divisions: List: Office of the Director; Operations Management; Law Enforcement Operations; Mission Operations

Website
- Official Website
- The exact number of Federal Air Marshals is considered sensitive security information by the TSA.

The Federal Air Marshal Service (FAMS) is a United States federal law enforcement agency under the supervision of the Transportation Security Administration (TSA) of the United States Department of Homeland Security (DHS).

Because of the nature of their occupation, federal air marshals (FAMs) travel often. They must also train to be highly proficient marksmen. A FAM's job is to blend in with other passengers on board aircraft and rely heavily on their training, including investigative techniques, criminal terrorist behavior recognition, firearms proficiency, aircraft-specific tactics, and close quarters self-defense measures to protect the flying public.

== History ==
In 1961, Gen. Benjamin O. Davis Jr., presented the idea of armed security forces on commercial flights. President John F. Kennedy ordered federal law enforcement officers to be deployed to act as security officers on certain high-risk flights. The Federal Air Marshal Service began on March 2, 1962, as the Federal Aviation Administration's (FAA) FAA Peace Officers Program. On this date, the first 18 volunteers from the FAA's Flight Standards Division graduated training. They received training from the U.S. Border Patrol at Port Isabel, Texas, and later went through recurrent yearly training in Brownsville, Texas. These initial FAA peace officers were named by FAA administrator Najeeb Halaby. Later, it became an integral part of the Civil Aviation Security Division of the FAA. As early as 1963, after an article in FAA Horizons Magazine, the FAA peace officers were referred to as sky marshals internally within the FAA, although the term would not be used by the media for nearly a decade. Many years after their initial inception, personnel were given firearms and some close quarters combat training at the FBI Academy located on the U.S. Marine Corps training grounds at Quantico, Virginia.

In October 1969, due to the increasing violence of hijacked aircraft in the Middle East, the U.S. Marshals Service started a Sky Marshal Division out of the Miami Field Office. The program was run by John Brophy and staffed with a handful of deputies. Since the majority of hijackings were occurring out of Florida in the late 1960s, the U.S. Marshals Service started their program to try and combat air piracy given their broad jurisdiction.

The "Sky Marshal Program" of the 1970s later became a joint effort between the then United States Customs Service and the FAA and was led by General Benjamin O. Davis Jr., a former Tuskegee Airman. On September 11, 1970, in response to increasing acts of air piracy by hijacking to Cuba and Islamic radicals, President Richard Nixon ordered the immediate deployment of armed federal agents on United States commercial aircraft. Initially, the deployed personnel were federal agents from the U.S. Department of Treasury. Subsequently, the United States Customs Service formed the Division of Air Security, and established the position of Customs Security Officer (CSO). Approximately 1,700 personnel were hired for this position and were trained at the Treasury Air Security Officer (TASOS) training complex at Fort Belvoir, Virginia. Customs security officers were deployed on U.S. flagged commercial aircraft, flying on both domestic and international routes in an undercover capacity in teams of two and three. Customs security officers also handled ground security screening on selected flights at domestic U.S. airports.

Following the mandatory passenger screening enacted by the FAA at U.S. airports beginning in 1973, the customs security officer force was disbanded and its personnel were absorbed by the U.S. Customs Service. By 1974 armed sky marshals were a rarity on U.S. aircraft. The former customs security officers were reassigned as customs patrol officers, customs inspectors, and customs special agents.

A small force of Federal Air Marshals were retrained at the FAA starting in 1974. The personnel trained under this program was limited to 10–12 people. For the next several years after customs security officer disbandment, the FAA air marshals rarely flew missions.

In 1985, President Ronald Reagan requested the expansion of the program and Congress enacted the International Security and Development Cooperation Act, which expanded the statutes that supported the Federal Air Marshal Service. The FAM program was begun in response to domestic hijackings and FAM operational flights were almost exclusively conducted on domestic U.S. flights until 1985. After the hijacking of TWA Flight 847 in 1985 and the enactment of the International Security and Development Cooperation Act, the number of FAMs was increased and their focus became international U.S. air carrier operations. Due to resistance of several countries including the United Kingdom and Germany to having individuals carrying firearms entering their countries, the coverage of international flights was initially limited. Resistance to the entrance of armed personnel to their countries was overcome through negotiations and agreements about the terms and handling of weapons when they were brought in country. Hence, the FAMs could operate worldwide in carrying out their mission to protect U.S. aviation from hijackings.

Air marshals were originally designated as U.S. Customs security officers assigned by order of President Kennedy on an as-needed basis, and later were specially trained FAA personnel. The customs officers were phased out in 1974. Many of them transferred to the FAA's Civil Aviation Security Division to serve as aviation security inspectors and also in the volunteer FAM program directed by the FAA's Civil Aviation Security Division (later renamed the Office of Civil Aviation Security). This program later became non-voluntary, required of all FAA inspectors, breeding other problems within the FAA's Office of Civil Aviation Security. In 1992, Retired Major General Orlo Steele, then the associate administrator for civil aviation security, hired Greg McLaughlin as Director of the Federal Air Marshal Program. McLaughlin was hired as an air marshal after the hijacking of TWA 847 and was working in Frankfurt, Germany, investigating the bombing of Pan Am 103. McLaughlin turned the Federal Air Marshal Program into an all-voluntary program. The voluntary nature of the program and efforts by McLaughlin and Steele turned the small force of Federal Air Marshals into an extremely capable one. From 1992 to just after the attacks on 9/11, the air marshals had one of the toughest firearms qualification standards in the world. A study from the Joint Special Operations Command (JSOC) later came out with a classified report during this time period, placing federal air marshals among the top 1% of combat shooters in the world. This is no longer the case due to changes in capabilities and training.

Before the September 11, 2001 attacks, the Federal Air Marshal Service consisted of varying numbers of FAMs dependent on government funding. Although 50 positions were authorized by Congress, only 33 FAMs were active on September 11, 2001. As a result of the 9/11 attacks, President George W. Bush ordered the rapid expansion of the Federal Air Marshal Service. Many new hires were agents from other federal agencies, such as the United States Secret Service, United States Border Patrol, the Federal Bureau of Prisons (BOP), the DEA, NPS, FBI, ATF, INS, U.S. Housing and Urban Development Office of the Inspector General (OIG), U.S. Postal Inspection Service (USPIS), IRS CID, and many others. Immediately after the attacks on 9/11, then-Director McLaughlin was tasked with hiring and training 600 air marshals in one month. A classified number of applicants were later hired, trained, and deployed on flights worldwide. As of August 2013, this number is estimated to be approximately 4,000. Currently, these FAMs serve as the primary law enforcement entity within the Transportation Security Administration (TSA).

On October 16, 2005, Homeland Security Secretary Michael Chertoff approved the transfer of the Federal Air Marshal Service from U.S. Immigration & Customs Enforcement (ICE) to TSA as part of a broader departmental reorganization to align functions consistent with the Department of Homeland Security (DHS) "Second Stage Review" findings for the following:

1. consolidating and strengthening aviation law enforcement and security at the Federal level;
2. creating a common approach to stakeholder outreach; and
3. improving the coordination and efficiency of aviation security operations.

As part of this realignment, the director of the Federal Air Marshal Service also became the assistant administrator for the TSA Office of Law Enforcement (OLE), which houses nearly all TSA law enforcement services.

In March 2014, Director Robert Bray announced six of the service's twenty-six offices would be closed by the end of 2016. Bray attributed the cuts to a reduction of operating budget from $966 million to $805 million and the Transportation Security Administration stated no positions would be eliminated.

== Securing other modes of transportation ==
Since July 2004, TSA has provided supplemental personnel, including federal air marshals, to assist mass transit systems during major events, holidays and anniversaries of prior attacks. These TSA personnel deploy as Visible Intermodal Prevention and Response Teams (VIPR teams), whose goal is to provide both unseen (random, unannounced, and unpredictable) and high-visibility (seen) presence in mass transit or passenger rail environments. The level of assistance transit systems request depends on a transit system's local political and security environment. Beginning in July 2007, TSA significantly increased the number and frequency of VIPR deployments from an average of one exercise per month to one or two per week.

There were issues with federal air marshals and early VIPR deployments. TSA field officials said the initial exercises put their safety at risk. TSA required federal air marshals to wear raid jackets or shirts identifying them as air marshals, which potentially compromised their anonymity. In response to this concern, TSA changed the policy such that federal air marshals began attending VIPR exercises in civilian clothes or jackets that simply identify them as DHS officials. Some transit security officials reported that federal air marshals were unfamiliar with local laws, local police procedures, the range of behavior encountered on public transportation and the parameters of their authority as federal law enforcement officers. In 2011, Amtrak temporarily banned VIPR teams from its property after screenings at the Savannah, Georgia station because Amtrak Police chief John O'Conner called their activities illegal and violations of Amtrak policy.

== Organization ==
- Executive Assistant Administrator of Law Enforcement/Director of FAMS
  - Deputy Executive Assistant Administrator of Law Enforcement/Deputy Director of FAMS
    - Assistant Administrator, Law Enforcement Operations
    - Assistant Administrator, Mission Operations
    - Assistant Administrator, Operations Management

=== Rank structure ===
The Federal Air Marshal Service uses the following rank nomenclature, introduced in 2011.

- Director
- Deputy Director
- Assistant Director
- Deputy Assistant Director
- Supervisory Air Marshal in Charge (SAC)
- Deputy Supervisory Air Marshal in Charge (DSAC)
- Assistant Supervisory Air Marshal in Charge (ASAC)
- Supervisory Federal Air Marshal (SFAM)
- Senior Federal Air Marshal
- Federal Air Marshal (FAM)

Previously, the supervisory ranks had different naming. A SAC was known as a special air marshal in charge as were the assistant and deputy SACs and a supervisory federal air marshal was known as an assistant to the special air marshal in charge or ATSAC. The rank change was introduced in 2011 to reduce an "us versus them" perception between supervisory and non-supervisory air marshals.

=== Field offices ===
The Federal Air Marshal Service has field offices located in or near the following cities:

- Atlanta
- Baltimore
- Boston
- Charlotte
- Chicago
- Dallas
- Denver
- Detroit
- Houston
- Las Vegas
- Los Angeles
- Miami
- Minneapolis
- Newark
- New York
- Orlando
- Philadelphia
- San Francisco
- Seattle
- Washington, D.C.

Starting in 2014 and ending in 2016, the following field offices were closed:

- Cincinnati
- Cleveland
- Phoenix
- Pittsburgh
- San Diego
- Tampa

== Training ==
Federal air marshals go through an intense, two-phase training program. The first phase of the program is a twelve-week basic law enforcement course. This training is completed at one of two Federal Law Enforcement Training Centers: either Artesia, New Mexico, or Glynco, Georgia. Air marshals also receive follow-on training at the William J. Hughes Technical Center in New Jersey at the Federal Air Marshal Service Training Center. Their training is tailored to their role. Some of the subjects covered in this training include constitutional law, marksmanship, physical fitness, behavioral observation, defensive tactics, emergency medical assistance and other law enforcement techniques. On April 7, 2023, the first instructional textbook on aviation-specific tactics used by federal air marshals was published by CRC Press, Routledge.

The second phase trains the candidates for tasks that they will be expected to carry out in the field. This training places an emphasis on perfecting marksmanship skills, including tactics for close-quarters combat and active-shooter situations, as well as close-quarters defensive skills. This is a necessity of the job due to both the confines of aircraft and the number of bystanders. Candidates who successfully complete this training are assigned to one of 20 field offices, where they begin their missions.

== Equipment ==
Federal air marshals carry the following equipment:

- Glock 19 Gen5 9mm or Glock 26 9mm
- SIG Sauer P229 or SIG Sauer P239 chambered in .357 SIG
- ASP 16″ expandable baton
- Handcuffs

According to an anonymous marshal, they are trained to "shoot to stop", typically firing at the largest part of the body (the chest) and then the head to "incapacitate the nervous system."

In early 2020, the Federal Air Marshal Service announced that it would be transitioning to the Glock 19 Gen 5 9mm handgun, and it awarded SIG Sauer the contract for ammunition.

Early in the program in the 1970s, air marshals carried the Charter Arms .44 Bulldog revolver loaded with Glaser Safety Slugs (a type of frangible bullet). This was designed to stop the threat without penetrating either the target or the aircraft.

== Practices ==
The air marshals may be deployed on as little as an hour's notice and at high-risk locations. Undercover air marshals were deployed on flights in and out of New Orleans during Super Bowl XXXVI in 2002; flights coming near Salt Lake City during the 2002 Winter Olympics; and cities visited by the president.

Federal Air Marshal Frank Terreri of the Federal Law Enforcement Officers Association (FLEOA) successfully sued senior executives of the Department of Homeland Security complaining that policies prevented air marshals from speaking out that current policies (such as their strict dress code, "Federal Air Marshal discount" mandatory grouping hotel policy, airport policies that force air marshals to walk up security checkpoint exit lanes, and priority aircraft pre-boarding before handicapped passengers and passengers flying with small children) make marshals easy targets for any possible hijackers, making them stand out as government agents concealing firearms, and thus eliminating their effectiveness.

A policy change in August 2006 allowed air marshals to wear whatever clothing they want, in addition to staying at any hotel of their choice to protect their anonymity.

On May 30, 2013, the first book on the history of the air marshals was published in the United States by Federal Air Marshal Clay Biles, who resigned three days after its publication. The book, entitled The United States Federal Air Marshal Service: A Historical Perspective, 1962–2012, gave never-before-released information on the more than fifty years of Federal Air Marshal Service. On July 1, 2014, a new book and personal memoir was published by Biles. The book, titled Unsecure Skies, gave a behind the scenes look at the inner workings of the Federal Air Marshal Service under the Transportation Security Administration, including discussions on alleged bureaucratic strain and favoritism within the agency.

== Immigration and Customs Enforcement ==
Budgeting issues within the TSA created tension between funding for airport screeners versus the FAMS, and in time the FAMS was realigned to U.S. Immigration and Customs Enforcement (ICE). The reasoning was that the FAMS could be re-designated as criminal investigator/special agents and would have a career path. ICE has an investigative division, Homeland Security Investigations (HSI), that is the critical investigative arm of the Department of Homeland Security whose special agents investigate criminal organizations illegally exploiting America's travel, trade, financial and immigration systems. HSI special agents would be cross trained to serve as supplemental FAMS in the event of a national emergency or in response to intelligence requiring additional marshals on flights.

Ultimately, one of Asa Hutchinson's final decisions before resigning as head of DHS's Border and Transportation Security Directorate was the issuance of a memorandum determining that air marshals would not be HSI special agents. In 2005, Homeland Security Secretary Michael Chertoff conducted a second-stage review of DHS' organization and ordered the FAMS to be moved from ICE and back to the TSA. This move to TSA was effective October 1, 2005.

== Controversies ==
=== Rigoberto Alpizar incident ===
On December 7, 2005, two federal air marshals shot and killed 44-year-old U.S. citizen Rigoberto Alpizar, a passenger of American Airlines Flight 924, on a boarding bridge at Miami International Airport.

According to initial media reports of the incident, a fight broke out between Alpizar and his wife, after which Alpizar suddenly ran up the aisle from the back of the plane. Lonny Glover, national safety coordinator for the Association of Professional Flight Attendants, said, "As the man came forward it was obvious that he was upset. ... That's when one of our attendants at the front of plane told him, 'Sir, you can't leave the plane.' His response, she said, was implying that he had a bomb in his backpack. It was at that point that the air marshals gave up their cover and pursued him out the door and up the jet bridge."

On December 8, 2005, White House press secretary Scott McClellan said that President George W. Bush was satisfied that air marshals acted appropriately in the Alpizar shooting.

=== Termination of Robert MacLean ===
On July 29, 2003, the FAMS Agency executive vice president for the Federal Law Enforcement Officers Association (FLEOA), FAM Robert MacLean, disclosed that the FAMS planned to remove air marshals from long haul flights in order to avoid the cost of an overnight hotel stay. The plan was ordered when TSA was faced with a budget shortfall and right after DHS issued a July 26, 2003, warning that terrorists were planning to smuggle weapons onboard aircraft leaving the U.S. East Coast, United Kingdom, Italy, and Australia with the intention of hijacking them. After congressional outrage, this plan was cancelled before going into effect. This plan was also at odds with the Aviation and Transportation Security Act (ATSA), whose Section 105 states that "Deployment of Federal Air Marshals ... [on] nonstop, long distance flights, such as those targeted on September 11, 2001, should be a priority."

MacLean was fired for "Unauthorized Disclosure of Sensitive Security Information" as a result of his whistleblower disclosure. Sensitive Security Information (SSI) is a label used for unclassified information that could compromise aviation safety. After challenging this charge in the U.S. Circuit Court of Appeals, which found that Maclean was protected under the Whistleblower Protection Act, he was unconditionally reinstated as air marshal.

=== Alcoholism ===
The New York Times reported in 2018, "Several air marshals said they took medication or drank alcohol to stay awake—despite a policy prohibiting alcohol consumption within 10 hours before work." Thirteen marshals received DUIs between 2016 and 2018. One marshal who was a recovering alcoholic, saw himself featured in a TSA alcohol awareness promo video and subsequently died by suicide. TSA opted to monitor whether employees were sober before boarding flights."

=== Other controversies ===
In recent years, the Federal Air Marshal Service has been the subject of controversies related to the number of flights that air marshals actually fly on and of criminal activities involving air marshals. CNN conducted an investigative report by Drew Griffin that included current and former air marshals that accused TSA of exaggerating the numbers of flights with on-board air marshals and of poor quality training. The TSA has rejected the report and pursued investigations into personnel who gave interviews to the media. They also responded to the accusations.

Another investigation was conducted by reporter Amy Davis of Houston news station KPRC into the possibility that air marshals with criminal convictions were still being employed by FAMS. The investigation discovered that 28 had been hired with pre-existing misdemeanors and that several current air marshals had been convicted of or were awaiting trial for offenses including disorderly conduct, DUIs, and sexual crimes against children. In a congressional hearing on aviation security, U.S. congressman Ted Poe of Houston questioned then-Assistant Secretary for the TSA, Kip Hawley, about some of the investigation's findings, saying, "there are some concerns about criminal record, criminal violations while they're in air service, and then what happens to them when they're on light duty still receiving full pay."

On August 6, 2006, two air marshals were sentenced in the Southern District of Texas (Houston) after having been convicted of conspiring to possess with intent to distribute cocaine and also on bribery charges. According to a Department of Justice press release, "Shawn Ray Nguyen, 38, and Burlie L. Sholar, 33, were sentenced to 87 months and 108 months in federal prison, respectively, by United States district judge Kenneth Hoyt on Monday, August 28, 2006. Nguyen's lesser sentence is a result of the court's consideration of his cooperation with the United States."

FAMS effectiveness against crime and terror, has also been questioned. According to Congressman John J. Duncan, the air marshal program has led to only 4.2 arrests a year, at an average cost of $200 million per arrest. He argued that this represents a win of the perceived dangers of terror, supported by a profit center-type approach, over realistic spending priorities.

On August 20, 2018, two air marshals were detained at the Minneapolis–Saint Paul International Airport after one of them allegedly showed their gun to the air crew during the flight, instead of their badge, as is required. The flight crew became suspicious and declared an emergency and landed the aircraft.

== In popular culture ==
- Liam Neeson plays a federal air marshal on a flight from New York to London in the 2014 thriller Non-Stop.
- The 2003 comedy film Anger Management features a federal air marshal (Isaac C. Singleton, Jr.) intervening in a conflict on a plane from Dave Buznik (Adam Sandler).
- Kevin Hart makes a cameo appearance as federal air marshal Dinkley in the 2019 action comedy Hobbs and Shaw starring Dwayne Johnson and Jason Statham.
- Ben Falcone appears as Air Marshal Jon in the 2011 comedy film BridesMaids.

== See also ==
- List of United States federal law enforcement agencies
- Federal Flight Deck Officer
- Aircraft hijacking
- Airport security
- Public transport security
- Federal Bureau of Investigation
- U.S. Customs and Border Protection
- U.S. Immigration and Customs Enforcement
- Sky marshal
- Terrorism
- Visible Intermodal Prevention and Response team
