= Let It Shine =

Let It Shine may refer to:

== Film and television ==
- Let It Shine (film), a 2012 American musical television film
- Let It Shine (1960 film), a Soviet film directed by Yevgeny Karelov
- Let It Shine (2007 TV series), a Singaporean Chinese drama
- Let It Shine (2017 TV series), a British reality music competition

== Music ==
- Let It Shine (album) or the title song, by Jeremy Fisher, 2004
- Let It Shine (soundtrack), from the 2012 film
- "Let It Shine" (Agnetha Fältskog song), 1987
- "Let It Shine" (Brian Wilson song), 1988
- "Let It Shine" (Linda Hargrove song), 1973; covered by Olivia Newton-John, 1975
- "Let It Shine", a song by Santana from Amigos, 1976
- Shine (Take That song), 2007

== See also ==
- "Let Your Light Shine on Me", or "Let It Shine on Me", a traditional gospel blues song
