= Flight 821 =

Flight 821 may refer to

- Delta Air Lines Flight 821, crashed on 25 March 1969
- Aeroflot Flight 821, crashed on 14 September 2008
