= United Airlines Flight 696 =

Aircraft hijacking

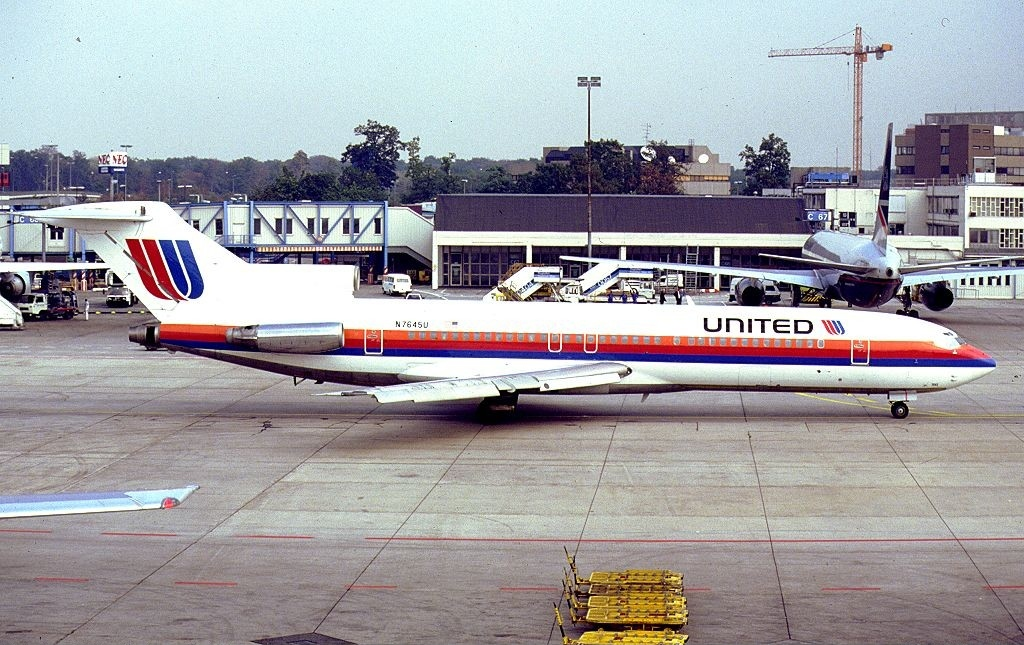
- A United Airlines Boeing 727 similar to the incident aircraft

Hijack
- Date: March 13, 1978
- Summary: Aircraft hijacking
- Site: Oakland, California; Denver, Colorado; 39°45′38.6″N 104°53′31.1″W

Aircraft
- Aircraft type: Boeing 727
- Operator: United Airlines
- Call sign: UNITED 696
- Registration: Unknown
- Flight origin: San Francisco International Airport, San Francisco, California
- 1st stopover: Oakland, California
- Last stopover: Denver, Colorado
- Destination: Seattle/Tacoma International Airport, Seattle, Washington
- Fatalities: 0
- Injuries: 3
- Survivors: 75

United Airlines Flight 696 was a flight from San Francisco International Airport in San Francisco, California, to Seattle, Washington, with 75 people in board on March 13, 1978, which was hijacked by a man claiming to have a bomb. The incident resulted in no serious injuries and the arrest of the hijacker, Clay Thomas.

== Background ==
After takeoff from San Francisco, Clay Thomas, claiming to have a bomb, hijacked the Boeing 727-222, demanding the plane land in Oakland, California, and fuel up for a flight to Cuba. The crew negotiated the release of all the passengers and cabin crew while on the ground in Oakland waiting for fuel. Panicked by the sight of police vehicles, Thomas cut the fueling short and demanded an immediate departure to Cuba. Once the plane was airborne, the pilot explained that the aircraft still did not have enough fuel to reach Cuba, and Thomas agreed to land in Denver, Colorado, for more fuel. About 90 minutes after landing, the three members of the cockpit crew all jumped to safety from the open cockpit windows, all suffering injuries in the 18-foot (5.5 m) jump. Within five minutes of the escape and without hostages, Thomas meekly surrendered to the U.S. Federal Bureau of Investigation.

== See also ==
- TWA Flight 106
- List of Cuba–United States aircraft hijackings
