= Federal Flight Deck Officer =

Airline pilot authorized as a US law enforcement officer

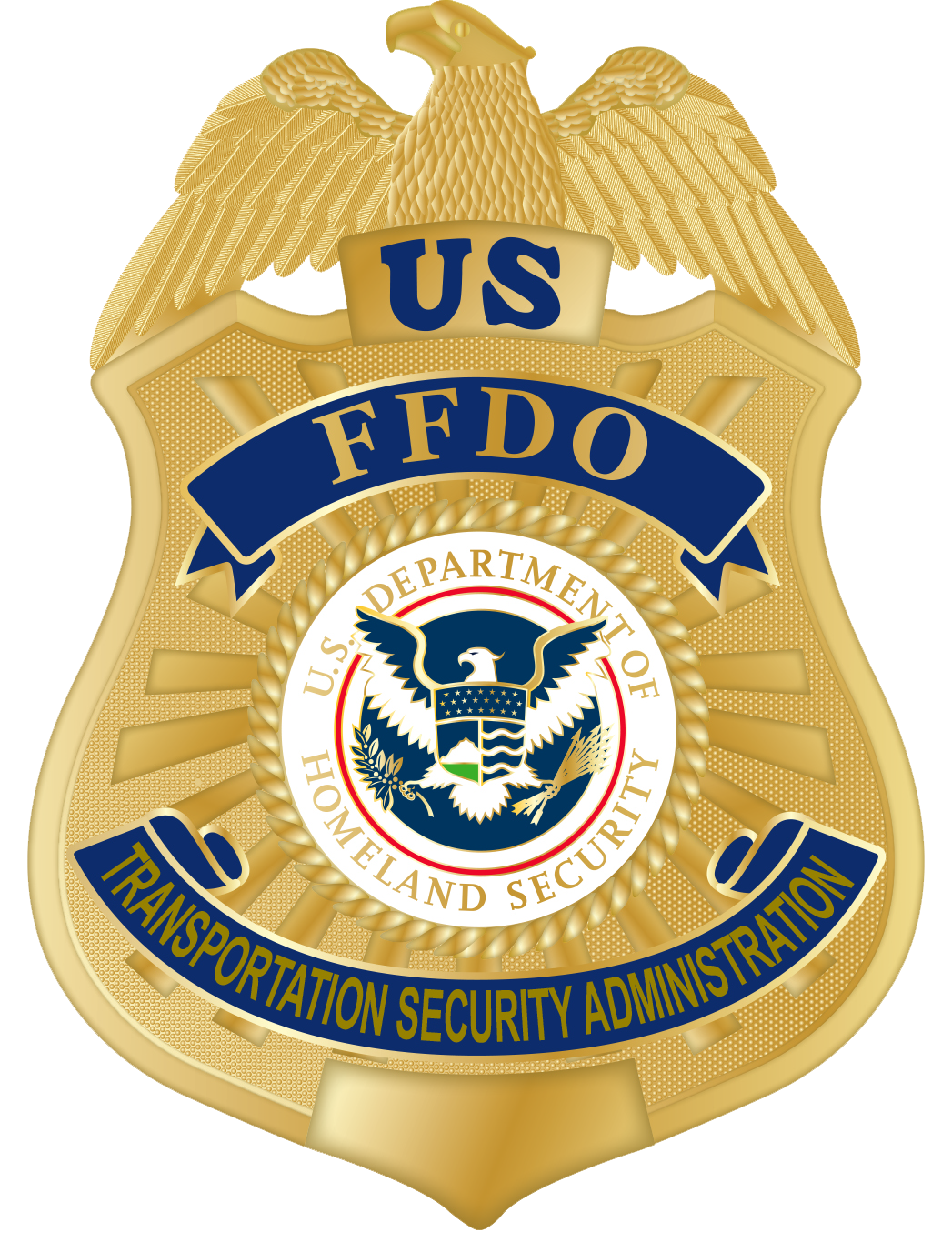
Illustration of a badge of a Federal Flight Deck Officer

A Federal Flight Deck Officer (FFDO) is an airline pilot who is trained and licensed to carry weapons and defend commercial aircraft against criminal activity and terrorism. The Federal Flight Deck Officer program is run by the Federal Air Marshal Service, and an officer's jurisdiction is the flight deck or cabin of a commercial airliner or a cargo aircraft while on duty. FFDOs are federal law enforcement officers sworn and deputized by the U.S. Department of Homeland Security.

== History ==
Following the September 11 attacks in 2001, the Arming Pilots Against Terrorism Act, part of the Homeland Security Act of 2002, directed the Transportation Security Administration (TSA) to develop the Federal Flight Deck Officer program as an additional layer of security. Under this program, flight crew members are authorized by the TSA to use firearms to defend against acts of criminal violence or air piracy undertaken to gain control of their aircraft. The first flight crew members that volunteered were pilots and flight engineers assigned to fly scheduled passenger air service.

In December 2003, President George W. Bush signed into law legislation that expanded program eligibility to include cargo pilots and certain other flight crew.

== Selection ==
All applicants must be airline pilots or flight engineers for a U.S. based airline and hold an appropriate FAA medical certificate. At the time of application for the FFDO position the pilots must be in an active, non-furloughed airline employment operating under 14 CFR part 121, which encompasses regularly scheduled passenger operations. Those who are not operating under 14 CFR part 121, such as charter pilots, business aviation pilots and flight instructors are not eligible to participate. Applicants must be U.S. citizens and have the ability to pass extensive background checks and a psychological screening. Initially, candidate selection preference was given to airline pilots who underwent prior government weapons training including former military and law enforcement experience.

== Training ==
Training of Federal Flight Deck Officers is similar to Federal Air Marshals (with some differences in training due to the more limited scope of FFDO powers). The initial program is conducted at a Federal Law Enforcement Training Center (FLETC) facility by Federal Air Marshal Service instructors in Artesia, New Mexico. Their training is tailored to the role that the FFDOs will perform while on duty. Some of the specific areas covered in this training include constitutional law, marksmanship, physical fitness, behavioral observation, defensive tactics, emergency medical assistance, and other law enforcement techniques. Simulators are used in the training program.

FFDOs are required to undergo multiple levels of frequent weapons re-qualification training and testing throughout their active service.

== Jurisdiction ==
FFDOs can exercise their authority within a specific jurisdiction. In most cases, their jurisdiction is limited to defending the flight deck of a commercial passenger or cargo airliner.

== Weapons ==
FFDOs are issued firearms and other support equipment by the U.S. Department of Homeland Security. Previously, the Heckler & Koch USP Compact .40-caliber pistol – with the company's "LEM" trigger design – was selected for a 4-year contract in 2003 to supply as many as 9,600 pistols to FFDOs. As of 2020, DHS has started to transition both FAMS and FFDO service weapons to a 9mm Glock 19 model (Gen-5)

== Participation and deployment ==
The exact number of active FFDOs and their distribution among airlines and flight routes is not known. Their information is not retrievable under normal law enforcement inquiry methods so as to protect their identity and the integrity of the program.

== Incidents ==
On March 24, 2008, a US Airways FFDO's gun went off on Flight 1536 from Denver to Charlotte. No one was injured and the aircraft landed safely. According to the FFDO, the gun fired while he was trying to stow it. The bullet went through the side of the cockpit and tore a small hole in the exterior of the plane. The plane was pulled from service for repairs.

On January 13, 2011, a JetBlue FFDO's bag carrying his gun was accidentally picked up by a passenger flying to West Palm Beach, Florida. When the passenger realized the bag was not hers, she notified a flight attendant. The FFDO's firearm was appropriately locked and secured and could not have been accessed or fired even if found.

In June 2015, a United Airlines FFDO threw live ammunition in the trash before eventually deciding to flush it down the lavatory toilet on an international flight from Houston to Munich.

In February 2017, a Southwest Airlines FFDO disembarked a plane in Phoenix, Arizona, leaving a loaded firearm unattended in the cockpit, after the FFDO was accused by a flight attendant of watching footage from a camera hidden in the airplane's lavatory.

In August 2022, a Delta Air Lines FFDO allegedly used his firearm to assault and intimidate a fellow crew member in response to a possible diversion of the aircraft due to a medical situation.

In January 2025, PSA Airlines FFDO Captain Jonathan Campos was killed in the line of duty in a midair collision on final approach to Ronald Reagan Washington National Airport in Washington, D.C. His is the first and only line of duty death of an FFDO.
