= Killing of Rigoberto Alpizar =

2005 death at Miami International Airport

Rigoberto Alpizar
- Alpizar in an undated family photo.
- Born: April 17, 1961; Cariari de Guápiles, Costa Rica
- Died: December 7, 2005 (aged 44); Miami International Airport, Miami-Dade County, Florida, U.S.
- Cause of death: Gunshot wounds
- Citizenship: United States
- Occupation: Retail worker
- Spouse: Anne Buechner

Rigoberto Alpizar (April 17, 1961 – December 7, 2005) was a Costa Rican-born United States citizen who was fatally shot at Miami International Airport by two United States Federal Air Marshals.

Alpizar lived in the central Florida town of Maitland and worked in the Paint Department of a Home Depot. He was supposed to fly with his wife, Anne Buechner, to Orlando, Florida, returning from a missionary trip to Quito, Ecuador.

The shooting took place on a jetway. Alpizar ran away from the aircraft and, Homeland Security officials maintain, claimed to have a bomb in his bag and then made a sudden movement toward it.

== Shooting ==
On December 7, 2005, upon landing at Miami International Airport, from Medellín, Colombia, the airplane on which Alpizar was traveling taxied to the gate and passengers began disembarking to be processed by customs agents. At about 14:00 (2:00 PM) EST, passengers continuing on to Orlando were re-boarding the plane.

As the plane finished boarding and all 114 passengers were seated, Alpizar was heard having an argument with his wife, Anne Buechner. He stood up from his seat saying, "I have to get off the plane", and ran for the door, which was still open. Buechner chased after him, yelling, "He's sick". He was followed by an undercover air marshal. According to James E. Bauer, two Air Marshals confronted Alpizar near the cockpit when Alpizar "uttered threatening words that included a sentence to the effect that he had a bomb". Homeland Security spokesperson Brian Doyle later claimed that Alpizar "threatened that he had a bomb in his backpack" and "made a move toward the backpack". Ignoring requests to stop, Alpizar continued to exit the plane and was soon confronted just outside the aircraft in the jetway. After being ordered to the ground, Alpizar allegedly did not comply, instead reaching for the bag. The two Air Marshals pulled out their .357 SIG Sauer pistols and opened fire, killing Alpizar. Conflicting reports put the number of shots between three and nine.

== Aftermath ==
=== Reaction ===
Just hours later, in a nationally broadcast interview with All Things Considered's Michele Norris, Eric Weiner of NPR reported the assertion of Homeland Security Special Agent in Charge James Bauer that Alpizar claimed to have a bomb in his carry-on bag. Recapping the events that led to Alpizar's shooting, Weiner reported, "They were reboarding the flight, it was continuing to Orlando. That's when Federal Air Marshals confronted this man. He was acting suspiciously, he claimed to have a bomb, Federal Air Marshals told him to get on the ground. He did not comply." Several passengers on the flight denied the government's claim, saying they never heard Alpizar say anything about a bomb. One of the passengers, John McAlhany, said in an interview, "I never heard the word 'bomb' on the plane", ... "I never heard the word 'bomb' until the FBI asked me did you hear the word 'bomb'." and another passenger, Mary Gardner, added, "I did not hear him say that he had a bomb". A spokesman for the Association of Professional Flight Attendants has been quoted as saying that a flight attendant who confronted Alpizar as he tried to leave the plane claimed Alpizar said "I have a bomb", though this assertion has not been repeated, and this flight attendant has not come forward. According to the Miami Dade State Attorney's Office Final Report of May 23, 2006, the pilot claimed to have heard Alpizar say he had a bomb.

=== No explosives found ===
After the shooting, police dogs sniffed all luggage for explosives and passengers were held on the plane until all luggage was cleared. No bombs or explosives were found. McAlhany said he remembers having a shotgun pressed into his head by one officer and hearing cries and screams from many passengers aboard the aircraft after the shooting in the jetway. "This was wrong", McAlhany said, "This man should be with his family for Christmas. Now he’s dead".

The D Concourse of Miami International Airport was temporarily evacuated following the shooting and was re-opened around 15:00 (3:00 PM) EST.

=== Significance ===
From Transportation Security Administration (TSA) and Homeland Security reports, this incident was the first time a U.S. Federal Air Marshal has fired a weapon in the line of duty. Six days after Alpizar was shot, the U.S. government gave the organization expanded powers to "identify suspicious passengers". The Air Marshals were "eager to conduct surveillance activities beyond the aircraft, and tighten security at public transit stations over the holiday".

=== Final resting place ===
Alpizar was buried in his birthplace Cariari de Guápiles in Costa Rica on December 13, 2005.

=== Miami-Dade state attorney's office report ===
A final report was released by the Miami-Dade State Attorney's Office on May 23, 2006. The report found that "the shooting officers were legally justified in their use of force and no criminal charges will be filed. The report notes as a key fact that Alpizar's wife said that her husband "threatened" that he had a bomb in his backpack, although this is not elaborated on further; i.e., precisely when Alpizar said this, to whom, how she heard this, and in what language the alleged statement was made.

Both federal air marshals (ages 30 and 31) claimed that Alpizar repeatedly stated that he had a bomb and would detonate it (one marshal said these threats were made in Spanish, the other marshal did not indicate a language), while advancing towards them and refusing commands to stop. The report indicates that the first air marshal was fluent in Spanish. Both said they issued commands in both English and Spanish. The second air marshal said that Alpizar said, "I'm going to blow up this bomb. I'm going to blow up this bomb. I'm going to show you."

The first officer (age 49) of the plane stood directly behind the air marshals, and said that English was spoken. The pilot said that Alpizar indicated he had a bomb, and continued advancing despite a warning that "If you don't take your hands out of the bag, we're going to have to shoot you." The pilot said Alpizar responded with, "Shoot me! Shoot me!" while repeating several times that he had a bomb, despite a further warning of "We're going to have to shoot you if you don't stop." The captain (age 50) of the plane was in a position to see both Alpizar's wife coming down the aisle and Alpizar in the jetway. The captain said that Alpizar was at the far end of the jetway, and turned around and advanced toward the plane, ignoring commands to stop. The captain said Alpizar defiantly yelled, "Shoot me! Shoot me!", and observed that Alpizar appeared serious and considered him a threat. The captain said that the air marshals repeatedly said they would shoot, but Alpizar advanced anyway.

The report also notes three other witnesses who said they heard either "I have a bomb" or "There's a bomb on board", but they could not determine which. The report notes one witness seated in the front of the plane say that Alpizar said "I have a bomb" as he ran by. Another witness seated in the first row said he heard Alpizar yell from the back of the plane, "I got to get off this plane. I have a bomb." Three flight attendants said that Alpizar said there was a bomb on board. The report does not indicate whether or not these flight attendants heard Alpizar say he had a bomb.

The report also noted many of the other witness comments made to news media, as well as Alpizar's not having taken his full dose of medication, and his unusual behavior in airports prior to the incident. The claim that Alpizar said he had a bomb (rather than that there was a bomb on board) arises from the statements of the two shooting federal air marshals, the pilot, the brief statement from Alpizar's wife (although it's not specified where and how she heard this), and two witnesses seated at the front of the plane (one of whom was in the first row and said he heard the claim from the back of the plane, the other saying Alpizar made this claim as he was running by). The air marshals were the only individuals to claim that Alpizar directly threatened to detonate a bomb.

From the air marshals' statements, it appears that the second air marshal fired one shot at first, but as Alpizar continued to approach, both air marshals began firing. The first air marshal fired three shots; the second, six shots. The autopsy showed that all non-grazing wounds were from front-to-back, with four projectiles found lodged in Alpizar's body. The autopsy also supports the finding that the backpack was being worn or held across Alpizar's chest.

== Pop culture references ==
- Canadian folk singer Jeremy Fisher has a song on his 2007 album, Goodbye Blue Monday, entitled "Lay Down (Ballad of Rigoberto Alpizar)" which alludes to the event.

== See also ==
- Shooting of Jean Charles de Menezes
