= Flood (Jeremy Fisher album) =

Studio album by Jeremy Fisher
- Released: October 25, 2010
- Genre: Singer/Songwriter
- Label: Aquarius
- Producer: Hawksley Workman

Jeremy Fisher chronology
Goodbye Blue Monday (2007)	Flood (2010)

Professional ratings
Review scores
Source	Rating
Sputnikmusic	4.5/5

Flood is the fourth album by the Canadian singer-songwriter Jeremy Fisher. It was released on October 25, 2010, by Aquarius Records.

== Production ==
The album was demoed using a drum machine.

== Critical reception ==
AllMusic wrote that the album "continued Fisher's increasing trend toward hooky, upbeat melodic pop." The Province called it "warm, folky pop with elements of reggae and world music."

== Track listing ==
1. "Shine a Little Light" – 3:11
2. "Naked Girl" – 3:21
3. "Laissez Faire" – 3:05
4. "Come Fly Away" – 3:09
5. "Nothing to Lose" – 4:05
6. "Alison" – 2:50
7. "Morning's Broke" — 2:55
8. "On a Monday" – 3:46
9. "Summer Rain" – 4:09
10. "Umbrella" – 3:44
11. "All We Want Is Love" – 4:18

== Personnel ==
- Jeremy Fisher
- Howard Redekopp – mixer
- Jarett Holmes - assistant engineer
