= Future Attribute Screening Technology =

Surveillance program

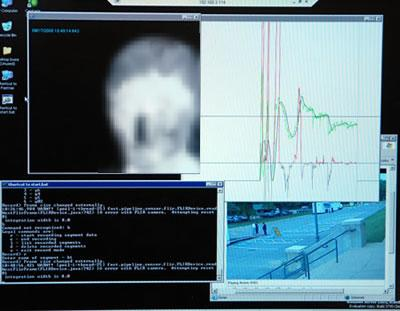
FAST screenshot (blurred)

Future Attribute Screening Technology (FAST) is a program created by the Department of Homeland Security. It was originally titled Project Hostile Intent. The purpose is to detect "mal intent" by screening people for "psychological and physiological indicators" in a "mobile screening laboratory". FAST aims to detect and model the behavioral cues that indicate an individual's intent to do harm and/or deceive. The cues examined in FAST are those that can be assessed remotely and in real time, like pulse rate, sweating, restless behavior, and possibly brain scans. The procedures and technologies required to collect these cues are non-invasive (like surveillance cameras and body heat sensors) and amenable to integration into busy operational contexts, like airports.

== Background ==
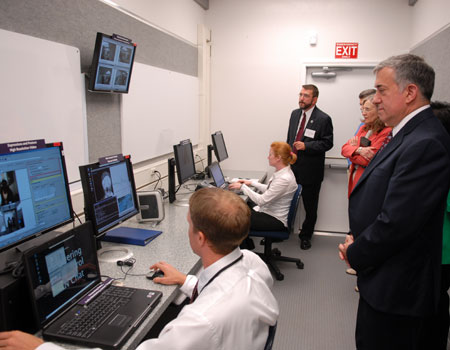
DHS officials viewing a FAST prototype demonstration

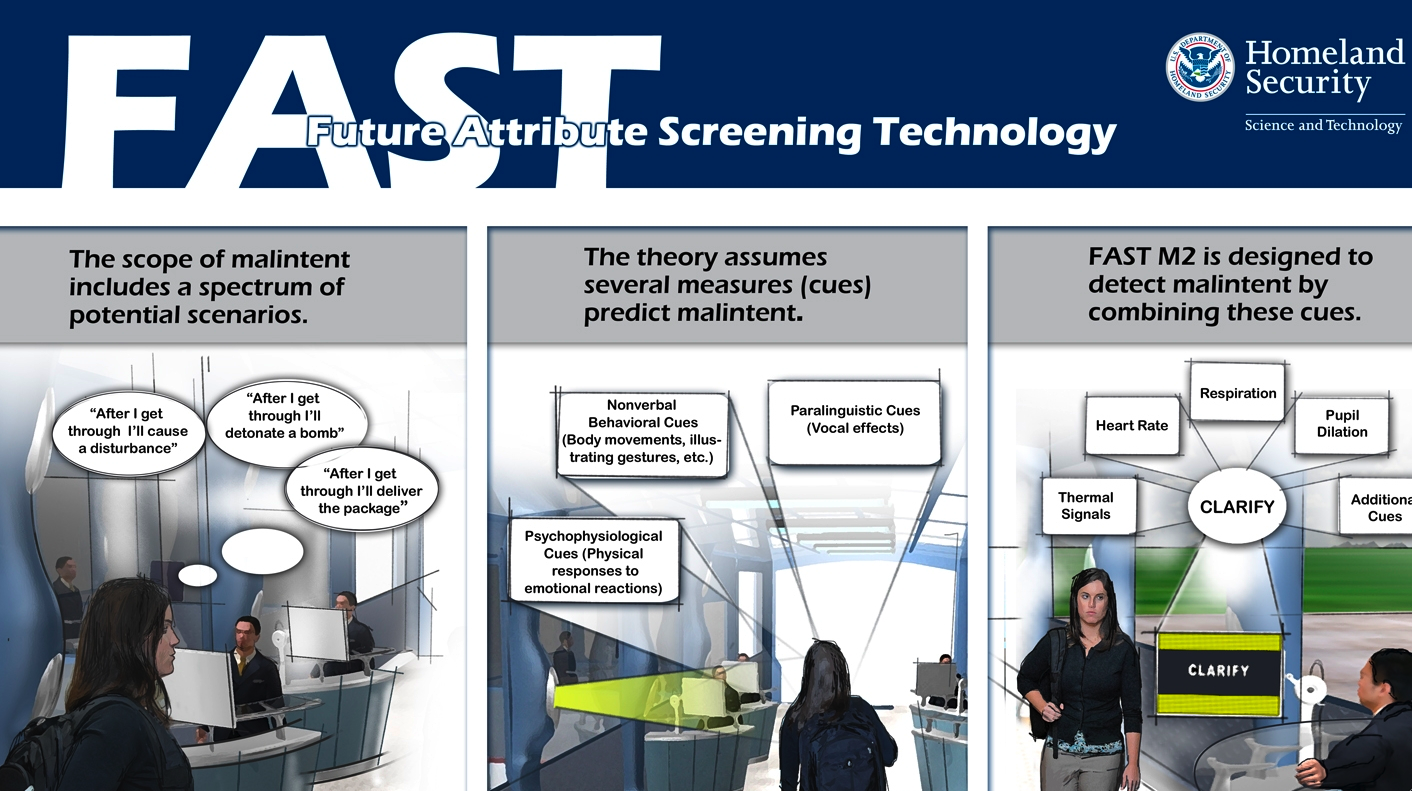
Artist's concept showing projected use of Future Attribute Screening Technology

The program was under the Homeland Security Advanced Research Agency and the Science & Technology Human Factors Behavior Science Division of DHS. In a meeting held on July 24, 2008, the DHS Under Secretary Jay Cohen stated, the goal is to create a new technology that would be working in real time as opposed to after a crime is already committed.

The DHS science spokesman John Verrico stated in September 2008 that preliminary testing had demonstrated 78% accuracy on mal-intent detection and 80% on deception. However, this was not a controlled, double-blind study, and researchers from Lawrence University and the Federation of American Scientists have questioned its validity without further evidence.

== MALINTENT ==
MALINTENT is a technological system that was developed by the U.S. Department of Homeland Security to be implemented for detection of potential terrorist suspects. The system measures pulse rate, skin temperature, breathing, facial expression, body movement, pupil dilation, and other "psycho physiological/behavioral patterns" to stop "unknown terrorists". The MALINTENT system uses a barrage of non-invasive sensors and imagers to detect and evaluate a person's facial expressions to gauge whether the suspect could be planning to commit an attack or crime. The technology would mostly be used at airports, borders, and special events. If the sensors pick up anything considered alarming, analysts can decide whether to subject a person to questioning. Fox News reported that the mobile units transmit data to analysts, who use "a system to recognize, define and measure seven primary emotions and emotional cues that are reflected in contractions of facial muscles." Results are transmitted back to screeners.

DHS produced a 'privacy impact assessment' in 2008. It described the system as comprising:

- A remote cardiovascular and respiratory sensor to measure heart rate and respiration
- A remote eye tracker
- Thermal cameras that provide information on the temperature of the skin in the face
- A high resolution video for looking at facial expressions and body movements
- Audio system for analyzing changes in voice pitch
- Possibly other sensors, perhaps pheromone detection
- Anonymized aggregate results of the scanned information

The DHS plan on using cameras and sensors to measure and track the changes in a person's body language, the tone of their voice and the rhythm of their speech. Civil liberties groups raised privacy concerns about the project but Burns from the DHS claims "the technology would erase data after each screening, and no personal information would be used to identify subjects, create files, or make lists". He reassured the public that regulations would be put in place to protect privacy if and when the technology is deployed.

== Organizations involved ==
- Battelle, Aberdeen, MD, Columbus, OH.
  - $1,356,690 DHS contract in 2007
- Farber Speciality Vehicle (trailer builders)
- Draper Lab, Boston, MA
  - $2.6 million DHS contract in 2009
- Navy Research Laboratory—working on a FAST related project

== Controversy ==
Other researchers, such as Tom Ormerod of the Investigative Expertise Unit at the UK's Lancaster University, argue that ordinary travel anxieties could cause false positives—Ormerod told Nature "even having an iris scan or fingerprint read at immigration is enough to raise the heart rate of most legitimate travellers". Others noted that the basic premise may be flawed. Steven Aftergood, a senior research analyst at the Federation of American Scientists, stated "I believe that the premise of this approach—that there is an identifiable physiological signature uniquely associated with malicious intent—is mistaken. To my knowledge, it has not been demonstrated." The Nature article in which he was quoted went on to note that Aftergood is concerned that the technology "will produce a large proportion of false positives, frequently tagging innocent people as potential terrorists and making the system unworkable in a busy airport."

Due to the ability of the system to 'read people's thoughts', it is potentially in violation of privacy laws such as the Fourth and Fifth Amendment to the United States Constitution. A summary of the scientific and legal issues with the program was presented at DEF CON in 2011 by independent security researchers.

== See also ==
- ADVISE
- Backscatter X-ray
- Fourth Amendment to the United States Constitution
- Information Awareness Office
- Lawrence Farwell
- MATRIX
- Psycho-Pass
- Surveillance
- The Minority Report
- Thoughtcrime
- Visible Intermodal Prevention and Response team (VIPR)
