= Back Porch Spirituals =

Studio album by Jeremy Fisher
- Released: December 9, 2001
- Genre: Folk pop
- Label: Independent album
- Producer: Jeremy Fisher

Jeremy Fisher chronology
Back Porch Spirituals (2001)	Let It Shine (2004)

Back Porch Spirituals is the first studio album by the Canadian singer-songwriter Jeremy Fisher. It was released independently in 2001.

Fisher bicycled alone across North America, from Seattle to Halifax, to promote the album.

== Reception ==
In reviewing the album, the Times Colonist wrote that the tracks on the album "seem to have seamlessly grown out of Fisher's Kerouacian rootlessness and contagious energy".

== Track listing ==
1. "The Devil Found a Friend in Me"
2. "Ain't Got Nothing but Plenty of Time"
3. "Jolly Rodger"
4. "Kiss the Moon"
5. "You, Me, and the Sunshine"
6. "Twister"
7. "Saddle Up the Horse"
8. "Marengo, Saskatchewan"
9. "Song for Robert Zimmerman"
10. "Safe and Sound"
