= Goodbye Blue Monday (album) =

Album by Jeremy Fisher

Studio album by Jeremy Fisher
- Released: (Canada) March 11, 2007 (United States) August 28, 2007
- Recorded: Signal Path Studios, Almonte, ON
- Genre: Folk pop
- Length: 43:30
- Label: Aquarius; Wind-up
- Producer: Hawksley Workman

Jeremy Fisher chronology
Let It Shine (2004)	Goodbye Blue Monday (2007)	Flood (2010)

Professional ratings
Review scores
Source	Rating
AllMusic	4/5 stars

Goodbye Blue Monday is the third album by the Canadian singer-songwriter Jeremy Fisher. It was released on March 11, 2007, by Aquarius Records in Canada and on August 28, 2007, in the United States.

The album title is the alternative name for Kurt Vonnegut's novel Breakfast of Champions.

== Critical reception ==
Exclaim! wrote that "Fisher does have a pleasingly warm voice and a flair for melody, while the instrumentation and production work is solid." No Depression called Fisher "a better derivative than most, with a lucent voice and an almost too-easy facility with melody." The Washington Post wrote that the album "brim[s] with his jaunty, literate acoustic pop-folk."

== Track listing ==
All songs were written by Jeremy Fisher, except where noted.

1. "Scar that Never Heals" – 3:38
2. "Jolene" – 3:08
3. "Cigarette" (Fisher, Jay Joyce) – 3:04
4. "American Girls" – 3:38
5. "Goodbye Blue Monday" – 4:37
6. "Lay Down (Ballad of Rigoberto Alpizar)" – 4:05
7. "High School" – 3:48 / "Remind Me" on Canadian version — 3:33
8. "Sula" – 4:05
9. "16MM Dream" – 4:17
10. "Left Behind" – 3:26
11. "Fall for Anything" – 5:54

== Personnel ==
- Jeremy Fisher – vocals, guitar, harmonica, bass guitar, wurlitzer, B3, piano, accordion, synthesizers
- Hawksley Workman – drums, percussion, xylophone, backing vocals, bass guitar, guitar, synthesizers
- Jim Bryson – gang vocals, piano
- Kelly Prescott – vocals
- Kaylen Prescott – gang vocals
- Tracey Prescott – gang vocals
- Ken Friesen - engineer
