= Southern Airways Flight 49 =

1972 aircraft hijacking

- N94S, the aircraft involved in the hijacking, seen in 1980, 8 years after the hijacking, whilst operating for Republic Airlines

Hijacking
- Date: November 10–12, 1972
- Summary: Hijacking
- Site: United States, Canada, and Cuba

Aircraft
- Aircraft type: Douglas DC-9-15
- Operator: Southern Airways
- IATA flight No.: SO49
- ICAO flight No.: SOU49
- Call sign: SOUTHERN 49
- Registration: N94S
- Flight origin: Memphis, Tennessee
- Stopover: Birmingham, Alabama
- 2nd stopover: Montgomery, Alabama
- Last stopover: Orlando, Florida
- Destination: Miami, Florida
- Occupants: 38 (including 3 hijackers)
- Passengers: 34 (including 3 hijackers)
- Crew: 4
- Fatalities: 0
- Injuries: 1
- Survivors: 38 (including 3 hijackers)

The hijacking of Southern Airways Flight 49 started on November 10, 1972, in Birmingham, Alabama, stretching over 30 hours, three countries, and 4,000 miles (6,400 km), not ending until the next evening in Havana, Cuba. Three men, Melvin Cale, Louis Moore, and Henry D. Jackson Jr., successfully hijacked a Southern Airways Douglas DC-9 that was scheduled to fly from Memphis, Tennessee, to Miami, Florida, via Birmingham and Montgomery, Alabama, and Orlando, Florida. The three were each facing criminal charges for unrelated incidents. Thirty-five people, including thirty-one passengers and four crew members, were aboard the airplane when it was hijacked. The hijackers' threat to crash the aircraft into a nuclear reactor led directly to the requirement that U.S. airline passengers be physically screened, beginning January 5, 1973.

== Hijacking and ransom demands ==
Shortly after takeoff from Birmingham after 7:20 pm on Friday, November 10, 1972, en route to Montgomery on a series of scheduled stops in Alabama and Florida, the three hijackers brandished handguns and hand grenades and took over the aircraft, demanding a ransom of $10 million (about $77 million today). The hijackers had the plane flown to multiple locations in the United States and Canada, including Cleveland, Ohio; Detroit, Michigan; Lexington, Kentucky; and Toronto; while the hijackers figured out their demands before finally arriving in Cuba. At one point, the hijackers threatened to fly the plane into a nuclear research reactor, the High Flux Isotope Reactor at the Oak Ridge National Laboratory, if their demands for $10 million in cash were not met; one hijacker announced "I'm not playing. If you do not get that money together, I'm gonna crash this plane in Oak Ridge." While over Oak Ridge, Tennessee, the hijackers negotiated with numerous officials, including FBI officials, who only managed to get between $2 million and $2.5 million (between $15 million and $19 million today) of ransom money. The plane later landed at Chattanooga, Tennessee's Lovell Field inbound from Knoxville, Tennessee's McGhee Tyson Airport to pick up the ransom. After picking up the less-than-demanded ransom money, the plane took off, bound for Havana. The hijackers passed out some of the ransom money to the passengers. Contrary to the hijackers' expectations, Cuban leader Fidel Castro did not accept them into that country; thus the hijackers had the airplane flown to Orlando, Florida, and discussed flying to Algeria (which was not possible due to the airplane's limited range). This marked the first time a hijacked airplane had left Cuba with the hijackers on board. While stopped for refueling at the Orlando Jetport at McCoy, the civilian commercial air terminal at McCoy Air Force Base, the joint civil-military airfield in Orlando that is the present day Orlando International Airport, the FBI shot out two of the airplane's four main tires, prompting the hijackers to shoot the co-pilot, First Officer Harold Johnson, in the arm and force the pilot, Captain William "Billy Bob" Haas, to take off.

== Capture and aftermath ==
The hijacking finally came to an end when the plane landed once again in Havana on Saturday, November 11, after traveling for some 30 hours and 4,000 miles (6,400 km). Multiple sources alleged the runway was covered in foam at the time of the landing, a claim the plane's co-pilot has denied. The hijackers were removed from the airplane at gunpoint by Cuban authorities and captured after attempting to escape. The hijackers served eight years in a Cuban prison before returning to the U.S. to serve additional 20- to 25-year prison sentences. Cuba returned the airplane, crew, passengers, and ransom money to the United States. The incident led to a brief treaty between the U.S. and Cuba to extradite hijackers, which has not since been renewed.

The hijacking was the subject of the National Geographic documentary series I Am Rebel premiere episode "Jacked" by Lana Wilson, which aired June 5, 2016.

== See also ==
- Delta Air Lines Flight 821
- List of Cuba-United States aircraft hijackings
- TWA Flight 106
