= Visible Intermodal Prevention and Response team =

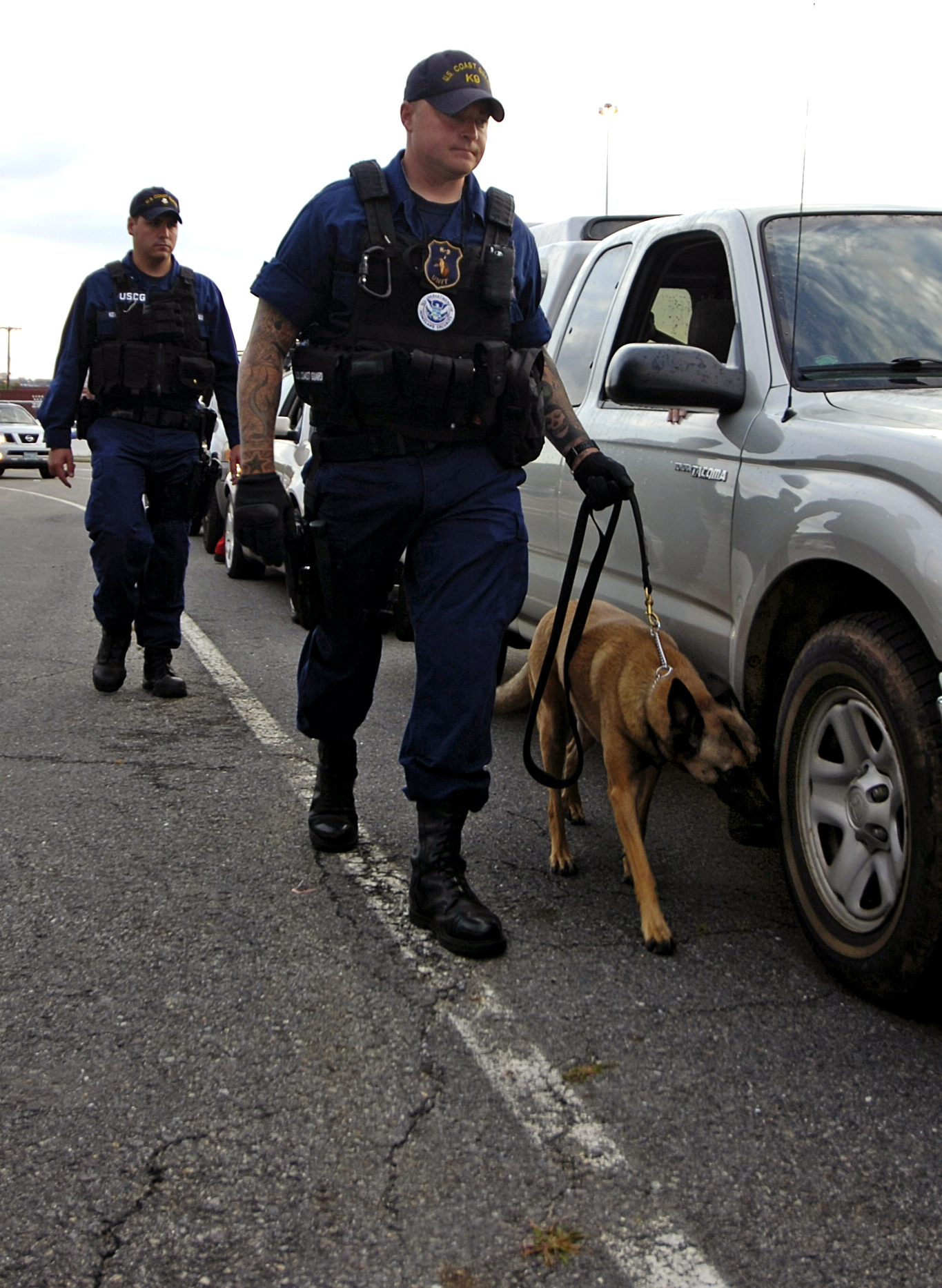
Coast Guard petty officers on a VIPR team at the Portland International Marine Terminal, Maine

A Visible Intermodal Prevention and Response team, sometimes Visible Intermodal Protection and Response (VIPR) is a Transportation Security Administration (TSA) program. Various government sources have differing descriptions of VIPR's exact mission. It is specifically authorized by 6 U.S.C. § 1112 which says that the program is to "augment the security of any mode of transportation at any location within the United States". Authority for the program is under the Secretary of Homeland Security. The program falls under the TSA's Office of Law Enforcement/Federal Air Marshal Service. TSA OLE/FAMS shares responsibility for the program with the Office of Security Operations and Transportation Sector Network Management.

The VIPR teams detain and search travelers at railroad stations, bus stations, ferries, car tunnels, ports, subways, truck weigh stations, rest areas, and special events. They also can deploy to deal with CBRNE/WMD (chemical, biological, radioactive, nuclear, and explosive weapons of mass destruction). They also inspect ships, containers, and vehicles.

== History ==
The GAO says VIPR was prompted by the 2004 Madrid train bombings. The program started up in December 2005. The program was first created to work in a "non-aviation environment". Bad initial planning caused "strained relations" with local law enforcement. In July 2007, VIPR teams carried out controversial operations in several cities for the holiday weekend (see below). In June 2007, VIPR began working in "aviation environments". In 2007 TSA reported there had been 84 missions in 18 months; as of 2011, the TSA was conducting about 8,000 VIPR operations per year. As of 2013, VIPR had an annual budget of $100 million and was growing rapidly.

Notable special events they have worked include the Presidential Inauguration, the Special Olympics, the Democratic National Convention, NFL games and others.

After the 2013 Los Angeles International Airport shooting, the TSA moved some of its 37 VIPR teams from surface-transportation settings to airports, according to TSA Administrator John Pistole.

== Purpose ==
Different sources provide different statements of purpose for the VIPR teams. Here are a few definitions given by various sources, most of them government officials:

Augmentation

- "Augment the security of any mode of transportation at any location within the United States."
- "These teams serve as a kind of force multiplier for transit agency security efforts."
- "To develop the capability to enhance security outside of aviation"
- "[Enhance] agency resources during special events."
- "Augment local law enforcement agencies"

Presence and detection

- "Provide a random, announced, high-visibility surge into a transit agency"
- "[Provide] an increased visible deterrent force for all modes of transportation for homeland security."
- "Provid[e] a visible, unpredictable presence in a mass transit environment."
- "[Help] create a calm atmosphere and sense of overall protection by their overt presence and coordination."
- "[Work] seamlessly with local law enforcement to provide deterrent presence and detection capabilities, and an unpredictable layer of security"
- "Highly visible operation to help detect and deter any suspicious or dangerous activity in various modes of transportation".
- "To covertly detect potential criminal terrorist pre-attack surveillance and other suspicious activity"

Terrorism and emergencies

- "To patrol aviation, rail and marine facilities nationwide as a counterterrorism measure"
- "[Develop] interagency response tactics in the event of a terrorist attack"
- "Enhance the coordination of local and federal agencies during an emergency"
- "[Prepare] to respond to a large-scale incident such as, a terrorist attack or natural disaster"

Miscellaneous

- "To sort of invent the wheel in advance in case we have to, if there ever is specific intelligence requiring us to be here, this way us and our partners are ready to move in at a moments notice"
- To detect "threats to national security as well as immigration law violators"
- "Seek out illicit radiological sources that may present a threat to the public".
- "Ship boarding and inspection; container/cargo inspection; port employee vehicle inspection checkpoints; and vehicle inspection checkpoints for truck and passenger vehicles"
- "VIPR teams are an essential part of protecting highway transportation vehicles and other critical infrastructures."
- X-ray trucks for "explosives, weapons, anything unusual", "radiation, explosives, and drugs". Perform "safety inspections"

== Components ==
VIPR team setting up a checkpoint at the Mississippi Port of Gulfport, 2009

Personnel may include the following:

- Federal air marshals (including covert, plainclothes)
- Surface Transportation Security Inspectors
- Transportation Security Officers (Screeners)
- Behavior Detection Officers
- Explosives Detection Canine Teams
- Aviation Security inspectors
- Federal Security Director
- Transportation Security Specialists: Explosives (formerly Bomb Appraisal Officers)
- Transportation Security Inspectors
- U.S. Immigration and Customs Enforcement Special Agents
- U.S. Customs and Border Protection Officers
- U.S. Border Patrol
- U.S. Coast Guard
- National Guard units
- Local law enforcement agencies (Highway Patrol, Fire Marshal, police, etc.)
- Joint Terrorism Task Force

Special tools may include

- nuclear and radiological detection equipment
- long range camera systems
- helicopters (UH-60 Blackhawk)
- emergency vehicles
- reconnaissance aircraft
- Coast Guard patrol boats
- Mobile drive-through x-ray detection machine, for explosives, weapons, and drugs

VIPR team capabilities
group	Visibility	Behavior Detection	Domain Familiarity	Arrest Authority	Explosives Detection	Screening
Transp. Sec. Inspectors	yes	some	yes	no	no	no
Transp. Sec. Officers	yes	some	some	no	no	yes
Behavior Detection Officers	yes	yes	some	no	no	yes
Federal Air Marshals	no (covert)	yes	some	yes	no	no
Canine teams	yes	some	yes	no	yes	no
Transit Police	yes	some	yes	yes	no	no

== Budget ==
FY2009: $30 million, 10 VIPR teams

FY2010: increase of $50 million, for 15 surface transport VIPR teams

FY2012: $109 million

- 10 aviation teams
- 15 surface transport teams
- 12 new multi-modal teams

== Criticism ==
=== 2007 Indianapolis bus searches ===
In 2007, some Indianapolis bus passengers complained to representative Dan Burton that the TSA searches violated their unalienable rights. Burton replied that Al-Qaeda was interested in attacking buses and that the "war on terrorism" was still ongoing.

=== DHS Office of Inspector General report (2008) ===
This report studies problems at VIPR. It "identified concerns regarding chain of command, unclear missions, and insufficient communication". It noted progress, but said those issues were "undermining agency efforts to advance mass transit security".

It especially discussed the controversial VIPR deployments on the weekend of July fourth in 2007. The TSA gave the local authorities short notice about the VIPR deployments, and did not consult them. This disrupted the plans that local authorities had created to deal with holiday traffic. Local transit officials had to work overtime accompanying VIPR teams unfamiliar with local systems such as rail stations; the TSA did not reimburse local groups for overtime. the TSA also compromised the anonymity, and thus safety, of Air Marshals by requiring them to wear clothing identifying themselves as Federal Air Marshals. VIPR deployments also caused tensions with transit officials and police unions. After these incidents, the TSA tried to improve its communication, including setting up a Joint Coordination Center.

The report also mentions a letter in which the National President of the Federal Law Enforcement Officers Association described the VIPR exercises as "clearly a waste of scarce Federal Air Marshal resources."

=== DHS Office of Inspector General report (2009) ===
This report focused on the role of Surface Transportation Security Inspectors on VIPR teams. It pointed out that TSI's were "underutilized" and their contribution to the VIPR operations was unclear.

=== House Appropriations Committee Report 111-157 (2009) ===
The U.S. Congress House Appropriations Committee wrote a report in September 2009 regarding the U.S. Department of Homeland Security. It included a section on VIPR. It specifically quoted from the two DHS Inspector General reports listed above.

The report also noted that the TSA had failed to prepare a report on the "performance standards to measure the success of its VIPR teams in detecting and disrupting terrorism", as it had been directed to by Congress previously. The committee also rejected the TSA's request for more funding for rail inspectors because the TSA had failed to hire people to fill its currently allocated inspector positions.

=== Screening of Passengers at Savannah Amtrak Station (2011) ===
In early 2011, a TSA VIPR detained and patted down people at an Amtrak station in Savannah, Georgia. The incident became controversial because instead of screening passengers as they boarded trains—the standard procedure—officers were screening passengers as they were getting off trains, presumably after potential terrorists would have detonated their explosives. According to Trains magazine, Amtrak Police Chief John O'Connor described the TSA behavior as illegal, in violation of Amtrak policy, and simply nonsensical. The incident led Amtrak to temporarily ban VIPR teams from Amtrak property.

=== DHS Office of Inspector General report (2012) ===
Some TSA officials told the auditors that VIPR deployments were not always based on credible intelligence. The auditors said the VIPR teams might not have the required skills and information to do their jobs.

== See also ==
- Backscatter X-ray
- Freedom of movement under United States law
- Future Attribute Screening Technology
- Non-Detention Act
- Project Hostile Intent
- Transportation Security Administration
- U.S. Department of Homeland Security
- United States Border Patrol Interior Checkpoints
