= Let It Shine (album) =

Studio album by Jeremy Fisher
- Released: October 12, 2004
- Genre: Folk pop
- Label: Sony Music Canada

Jeremy Fisher chronology
Back Porch Spirituals (2001)	Let It Shine (2004)	Goodbye Blue Monday (2007)

Professional ratings
Review scores
Source	Rating
Now	2/5 stars
Stylus Magazine	D

Let It Shine is the second album by the Canadian singer-songwriter Jeremy Fisher. It was released on October 12, 2004, by Sony Music Canada.

== Release and reception ==
Let It Shine is Fisher's only album to be released by a major label. "High School" was a hit single in Canada, where it was widely played on radio and television.

The Calgary Herald wrote that Fisher "punctuates his bouncy songs with observational humour and loads of catchy melodies." Stylus Magazine called the album "a badly crafted inauthentic mess."

== Track listing ==
1. "Lemon Meringue Pie" - 3:10
2. "Sucker Punch" - 2:50
3. "High School" - 3:58
4. "Shooting Star (In Spite of It All)" - 3:31
5. "On Par" - 4:18
6. "Fall For Anything" - 4:52
7. "Singing On the Sidewalk" - 3:12
8. "Drunk On Your Tears" - 4:06
9. "Living On the Moon" - 3:53
10. "Let It Shine" - 4:58
11. "Just Friends" - 3:00
