= Jeremy Fisher =

Canadian singer-songwriter (born 1976)

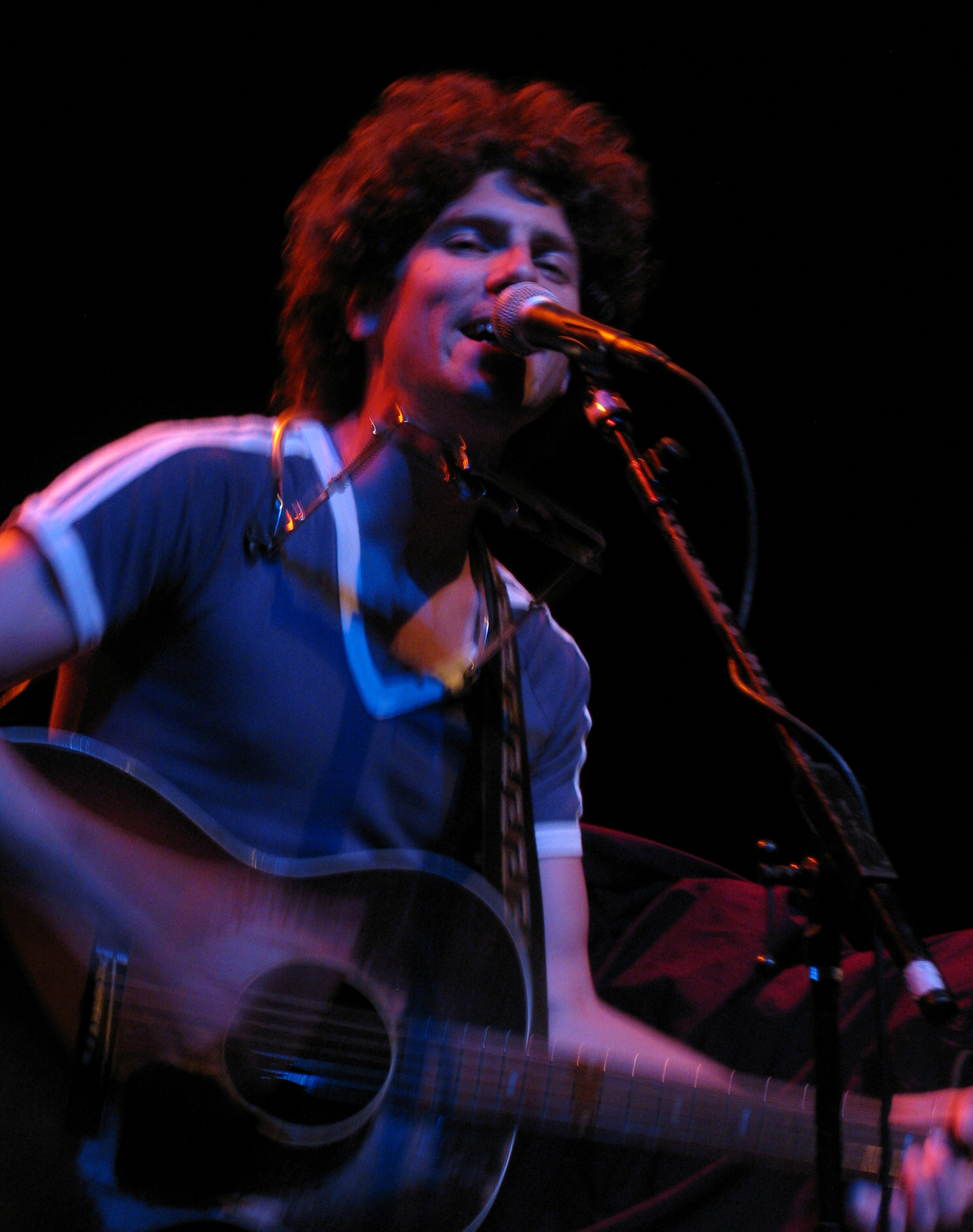
- Jeremy Fisher – 2009

Background information
- Born: Jeremy Binns; December 15, 1976 (age 49); Hamilton, Ontario, Canada
- Genre: folk rock
- Instruments: acoustic guitar; slide guitar; harmonica
- Years active: 2001–present (solo)
- Labels: Sony Music; BGM; Aquarius Records; Wind-up Records
- Website: jeremyfishermusic.com

Jeremy Fisher (born Jeremy Binns; December 15, 1976) is a Canadian singer-songwriter. Fisher is based in Ottawa, Ontario, and was previously based on Vancouver Island, B.C., Montreal, Quebec, and in Seattle, Washington, US. Fisher's work is heavily influenced by folk and blues music, and his songs feature accompaniment by acoustic guitar, slide guitar and harmonica.

== Life and career ==
Fisher's mother, Judy Binns, is from Newfoundland, Canada. Fisher was a member of the Hamilton All Star Jazz Band at Westdale Secondary School (Class of 1995), attended Camp Gesher in 1999, and became a camp counsellor at YMCA Wanakita.

He performed with the band The Obvious under the name Jeremy Binns, and some of his early songs that he performed with The Obvious, including "Lemon Meringue Pie" and "Kiss the Moon" are on his later albums. In 1999, The Obvious put out a self-titled CD.

To support his 2001 independent debut album, Back Porch Spirituals, Fisher spent six months touring from Seattle, across Canada to Halifax, Nova Scotia by bicycle. The tour, dubbed "One Less Tourbus", travelled 7,500 kilometres, included 30 performances, and worked with the Institute for Transportation and Development Policy to raise funds for the "Tour des", promoting access to bicycle transport and to education for girls in Africa. Fisher has also performed as a sidewalk busker.

Let It Shine, his first album on a major label (Sony BMG Music Canada), was released on October 12, 2004. "High School", the second single from the album, won wide airplay on Canadian commercial radio and music television in early 2005.

In February and March 2005, Fisher toured Canada with Sarah Slean, and in April, he was a featured performer in the Canada Performing Arts Program at Expo 2005 in Aichi Prefecture, Japan.

In 2006, Jeremy toured with Xavier Rudd and opened for Rex Goudie on Rex's Outports Tour 2006.

Fisher dueted with Canadian industrial music supergroup Jakalope on the track "Unsaid" from their Born 4 album, released in 2006.

His third album, entitled Goodbye Blue Monday, with fellow Canadian Hawksley Workman, was released on March 27, 2007, by his new record label, Aquarius Records. The single "Cigarette" was serviced to radio in Canada after a surprise add at Toronto radio station 104.5 CHUM-FM in early 2007. A home-made video for the song has been viewed over two million times on YouTube. On August 20, 2007, Fisher made his U.S. television debut on The Late Late Show with Craig Ferguson. The following night, he again appeared on the Late Late Show but this time with Craig Northey and Pat Steward of Odds. Goodbye Blue Monday was released in the United States on August 28, 2007, through Wind-up Records.

In April and May 2008, Fisher opened for The Proclaimers on their North American tour. He also opened for several of Great Big Sea's Ontario shows in September 2009, eventually making a guest appearance on their 2010 album Safe Upon the Shore.

His album Flood was released on October 26, 2010, followed in 2012 by Mint Juleps.

In June 2012, he launched a "Catch and Release" series with singer-songwriter Jim Bryson, in which the two musicians collaborated on a project to write and release a song in a single day. The first song in the series, "The Age of Asparagus", was released on June 7, 2012.

His 2014 album, The Lemon Squeeze, features a duet with Serena Ryder.

In February 2021 he released Hello Blue Monday, an album of new rerecordings of songs from Goodbye Blue Monday.

The television series Family Law uses the song "Uh-Oh" as its opening theme.

=== Children's music ===
Fisher has also released music for children, inspired in part by making music for and with his own daughters.

His first children's album, Highway to Spell, was released on March 9, 2018, and credited to "Jeremy Fisher Junior". The album was a Canadian Folk Music Award nominee for Children's Album of the Year at the 14th Canadian Folk Music Awards.

In 2022 he created the children's television series Jeremy and Jazzy, costarring animated versions of Fisher and singer-actress Aiza Ntibarikure. Say Hello, an album of songs from the series, was a Juno Award nominee for Children's Album of the Year at the Juno Awards of 2023.

== Discography ==
=== Studio albums ===
| Year | Album | Record label |
|---|---|---|
| 2001 | Back Porch Spirituals | Independent release |
| 2004 | Let It Shine | Sony Music Canada |
| 2007 | Goodbye Blue Monday | Aquarius |
| 2010 | Flood | Aquarius |
| 2010 | Fish Hooks | Aquarius |
| 2012 | Mint Juleps | Hidden Pony Records |
| 2014 | The Lemon Squeeze | Hidden Pony Records |
| 2018 | Highway to Spell | |
| 2021 | Hello Blue Monday | |
| 2022 | Say Hello | |

=== Singles ===
| Year | Title | Album |
|---|---|---|
| 2004 | "High School" | Let It Shine |
| 2007 | "Cigarette" | Goodbye Blue Monday |
| 2008 | "Remind Me" | Goodbye Blue Monday |
| 2014 | "Uh-Oh feat. Serena Ryder" | The Lemon Squeeze |
| 2017 | "This Is the Good Life" | non-album single |
