= TWA Flight 106 =

Hijacked flight

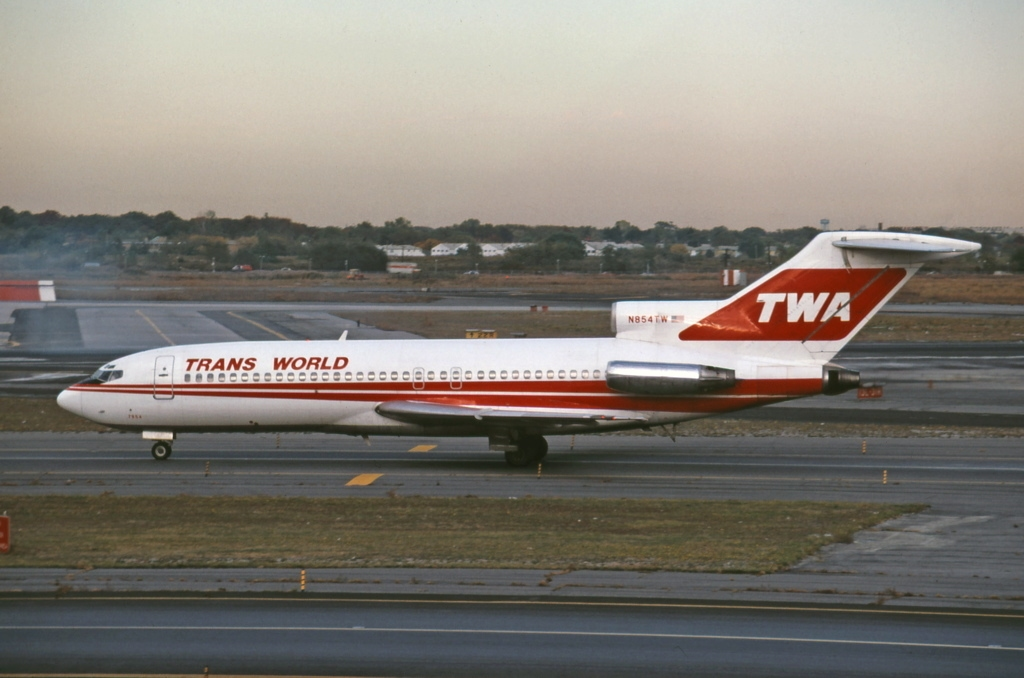
- N854TW, the aircraft involved, seen 13 years after the incident

Hijacking
- Date: November 27, 1971
- Summary: Hijacking by fugitives seeking political asylum in Cuba
- Site: Albuquerque International Sunport, Albuquerque, New Mexico, U.S.

Aircraft
- Aircraft type: Boeing 727-31 (Note: The aircraft was a Boeing 727-100 model. Boeing assigned customer codes to every airline that ordered one of their aircraft between 1958 and 2016; this code forms part of the model suffix. On the 727-100, the leading 1 was dropped, and with the code for Trans World Airlines being 31, the resulting designation was 727-31.)
- Operator: Trans World Airlines
- IATA flight No.: TW106
- ICAO flight No.: TWA106
- Call sign: TWA 106
- Registration: N854TW
- Flight origin: Phoenix Sky Harbor International Airport, Phoenix, Arizona, United States
- Stopover: Albuquerque International Sunport, Albuquerque, New Mexico, United States
- Destination: O'Hare International Airport, Chicago, Illinois, United States
- Occupants: 51 (Including 3 hijackers)
- Passengers: 45 (including 3 hijackers)
- Crew: 6
- Fatalities: 0
- Survivors: 51

Trans World Airlines Flight 106 was a scheduled passenger flight from Phoenix, Arizona, to Chicago, Illinois, in the United States. On November 27, 1971, the Boeing 727 servicing the flight was hijacked by three armed and wanted men at Albuquerque International Sunport in Albuquerque, New Mexico, and flown to Havana, Cuba.

== Aircraft and crew ==
The aircraft that operated the incident flight was a Boeing 727-100, registered as N854TW. The crew members of Flight 106 were all from Kansas City, Missouri. They were Captain John B. McGhee, First Officer Robert M. Clark, and Flight Engineer John M. McFarland. There were also three flight attendants. Forty-five passengers were aboard the aircraft.

== Background ==
On November 8, 1971, 24-year-old Ralph Goodwin of Berkeley, California, 20-year-old Michael Albert Finney from Oakland, and 21-year-old Charles Hill from Albuquerque, New Mexico – members of the Republic of New Afrika, a black separatist organization – were pulled over in a rented Ford Galaxie sedan, loaded with weapons for the organization, by New Mexico State Police Officer Robert Rosenbloom on Interstate 40, eight miles (13 km) west of Albuquerque for a traffic violation. During the stop, one of the men shot and killed Officer Rosenbloom. The next day, the sedan was found abandoned, containing firearms and bomb materials. The three men were then subject to a statewide manhunt. Fearing reprisal at a time when capital punishment was still legal in New Mexico, the three men hid out in the desert for nineteen days, making plans for an escape while evading "250 law enforcement officers". According to Hill, “We had to go into exile so we [decided to hijack] a plane”. The three men initially planned to flee to Africa.

On the morning of November 27, an Albuquerque business owner and wrecker driver, Vic Dugger, received a call about a disabled vehicle at a Southeast Heights residence. When he arrived at the residence, one of three men was standing in the roadway waving his arms. The three men proceeded to hijack the wrecker and Dugger using a .45 caliber pistol. They instructed Dugger to drive them to the Sunport and up to a TWA Boeing 727 parked on the airport apron. They then hijacked the aircraft. Dugger later identified the three hijackers as the suspects of Officer Rosenbloom's murder.

== Hijacking ==
The hijackers boarded the aircraft where they confronted local resident and TWA employee Ronald Simpson. At one point, one of the men asked Simpson if he had "ever been to Cuba before". Simpson replied he had never been to Cuba, stating "There's a first time for everything". Simpson was refueling the plane at the time, so the hijackers allowed him to leave after he explained that he had to disconnect his refueling truck from the aircraft in order to take off.

The hijackers ordered Captain McGhee to fly to Havana, Cuba. They originally planned to fly to Africa with a refueling stop in Atlanta, Georgia, but when McGhee informed them the aircraft had insufficient range for an intercontinental flight, they decided to fly to Cuba instead. The aircraft landed in Tampa, Florida, where the passengers were allowed to leave. The hijackers demanded that the aircraft be refueled, even though they were informed the plane had ample fuel for a round trip to Havana. The aircraft then took off with the hijackers and the six crew members aboard.

When the aircraft landed in Havana, those aboard were detained; the crew returned to the United States the next day while Cuban Prime Minister Fidel Castro granted the hijackers political asylum.

== Life in Cuba ==
Ralph Goodwin drowned in 1973, and Michael Finney died of throat cancer in 2005.

Charles Hill requested military training to fight with the revolutionaries in Africa, but his request was denied by the Cuban government. He was instead assigned work cutting sugarcane, doing construction, managing a clothing store, and other "menial jobs". One of his supervisors was Castro's brother Ramón Castro Ruz, whom Hill remarked "was good to us, made sure we were always well fed." Hill married twice in Cuba and has two children there.

In 2015, Hill was interviewed by the press after two years of attempted contact while living in Cuba.

Hill's continued self-exile in Cuba has been cited as an obstacle to warming Cuba-United States relations.

== See also ==
- Southern Airways Flight 49
- Delta Air Lines Flight 821
- List of Cuba-United States aircraft hijackings
