= Delta Air Lines Flight 821 =

1969 airliner hijacking

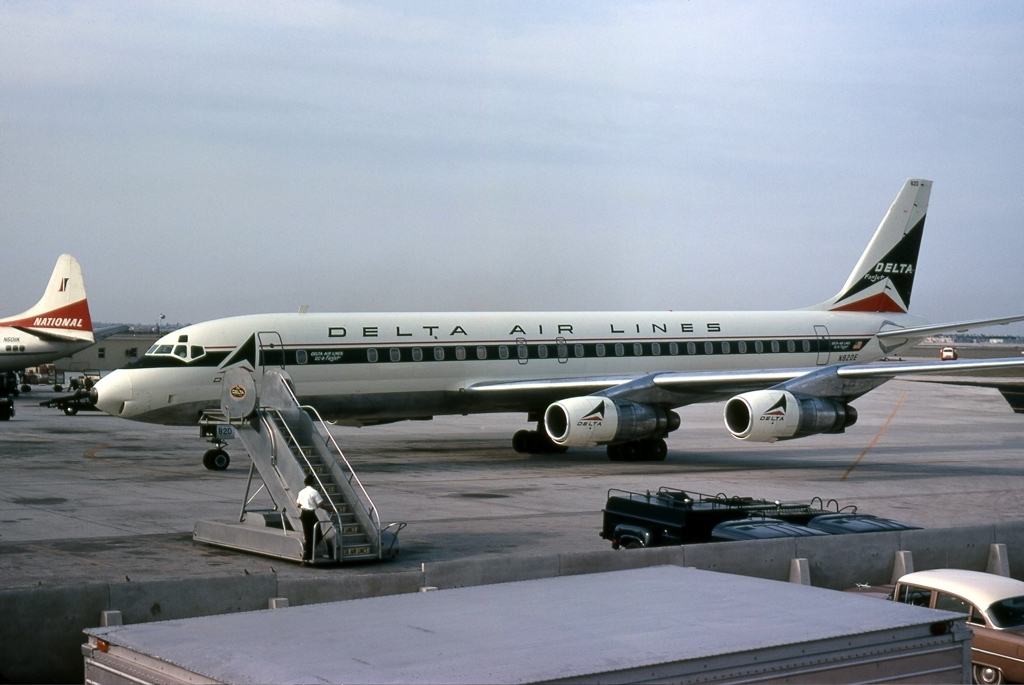
- A Delta Air Lines Douglas DC-8, similar to the one involved.

Hijacking
- Date: March 25, 1969
- Summary: Hijacking
- Site: Havana, Cuba

Aircraft
- Aircraft type: Douglas DC-8
- Operator: Delta Air Lines
- Registration: Unknown
- Flight origin: Newark International Airport, Newark, New Jersey
- 2nd stopover: Dallas Love Field, Dallas, Texas, United States
- 3rd stopover: Atlanta Municipal Airport, Atlanta, Georgia
- Last stopover: San Diego International Airport, San Diego, California
- Destination: Los Angeles International Airport, Los Angeles, California
- Occupants: 114
- Passengers: 107
- Crew: 7
- Fatalities: 0
- Survivors: 114

On March 25, 1969, Luis Antonio Frese hijacked Delta Air Lines Flight 821 (DC-8) from Dallas, Texas to Havana, Cuba. Frese was indicted in Texas but never returned to the United States to face prosecution. He reportedly died in Cuba in 1975.

The aircraft was en route from Newark to Los Angeles with stop overs in Atlanta, Dallas and San Diego. There were 114 occupants on board: 7 crew and 107 passengers, which included 26 Marine recruits en route to San Diego and additional military personnel. This was the 14th hijacking of a US airliner in the year 1969. After being hijacked to Havana, the flight diverted to Miami before continuing on its planned route.

== See also ==
- TWA Flight 106
- Southern Airways Flight 49
- List of Cuba–United States aircraft hijackings
