= List of Cuba–United States aircraft hijackings =

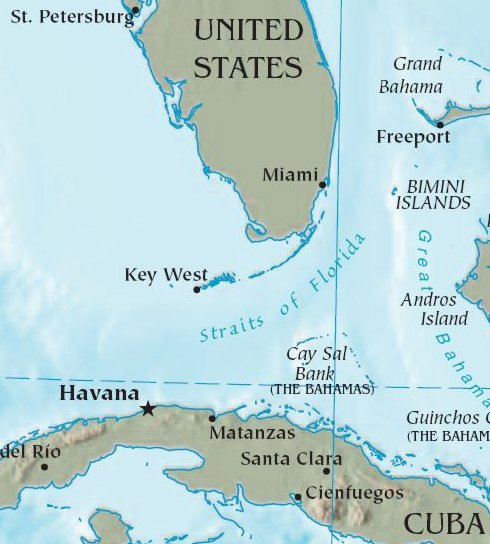
Cuba is 90 miles (145 kilometres) south of Florida in the United States

Aircraft hijacking incidents between the United States and Cuba were at their height between 1968 and 1972. These incidents have variously been attributed to terrorism, extortion, flight for political asylum, mental illness, and transportation between the two countries as a result of the ongoing antagonistic Cuba-United States relations and the Communist government restrictions against Cubans attempting to leave Cuba. Subsequent measures by both governments contributed to a gradual reduction of reported incidents towards the mid-1970s. Governmental measures included an amendment to Cuban law which made hijacking a crime in 1970, the introduction of metal detectors in U.S. airports in 1973, and a joint agreement between the U.S. and Cuba signed in Sweden to return or prosecute hijackers.

Below is a non-comprehensive list of hijacking incidents of aircraft between Cuba and the United States.

== 1950s ==
Before the Cuban Revolution:

- April 9, 1958 A Douglas DC-3, (CU-T266) piloted by Capt. Armando Piedra, co-piloted by Ramon J. Vazquez (el Niño) Cubana de Aviación is hijacked en route from José Martí International Airport, Havana to Santa Clara Airport. The aircraft landed at Mérida-Rejón Airport, Mexico where the hijack ended. This is considered the first hijacking to take place in the Western Hemisphere.
- April 12, 1958 The crew of a Cuban Airlines DC-3 with 12 passengers on board, diverted their flight from Havana to Santa Clara in Central Cuba, and flew, instead, to Miami, Florida. One of the passengers, United Press reporter Harold Lidin, said that the decision to defect was apparently made after takeoff.
- April 13, 1958 A Cuban Airlines DC-3 is hijacked by three crew members, forcing it to fly to Miami.
- November 1, 1958 A Cubana de Aviación Flight 495, a Vickers Viscount, en route from Miami to Varadero to Havana is hijacked by Cuban militants. The hijackers were trying to land at Sierra Cristal in Eastern Cuba to deliver weapons to Fidel Castro's rebels. As night approached, the plane ran out of fuel and tried an emergency landing at the Preston sugar mill. It did not make it and instead landed in the ocean and broke apart, killing most passengers and crew. There were 6 survivors and 14 dead.

After the Cuban Revolution:

- April 15, 1959 A plane is hijacked from Cuba to Miami. The hijackers were four members of Batista's Army (three were from the SIM—the Military Intelligence—and one was an aviation mechanic). The airplane is returned by the U.S.
- April 16, 1959 An Aerovías Cubanas Internacionales C-46 is forced to land in the United States by four men with guns.
- April 25, 1959 A Cubana de Aviación Vickers Viscount is taken by four hijackers and diverted to Key West, Florida.
- October 2, 1959 a Viscount of Cubana de Aviación is hijacked on a flight from Havana to Antonio Maceo Airport, Santiago. The aircraft landed at Miami International Airport.

== 1960s ==
- April 12, 1960 A Cubana Vickers Viscount is hijacked by three crew members and a passenger and diverted to Miami. After landing, the hijackers demanded political asylum in the United States.
- July 5, 1960 A Cubana Bristol Britannia 138 is seized by two co-pilots and diverted to Miami.
- July 28, 1960 The captain of a Cubana DC-3 and two passengers forced the copilot out of the cockpit. The captain diverted the plane to Miami and requested political asylum.
- October 29, 1960 Cubana Flight 905, a DC-3, is hijacked by the co-pilot who took an air marshal hostage and forced the plane to fly to Key West. A shooting killed the marshal. The co-pilot and eight passengers involved in the hijack request asylum in the United States; two other passengers also request asylum.
- December 8, 1960 A Cubana aircraft crashed near Cienfuegos after five Cubans attempted to hijack the plane to the United States. A gun battle killed one person before the flight crashed.
- January 1, 1961 A Cubana Bristol Britannia 318 is hijacked by two people and diverted to New York City.
- May 1, 1961 Antulio Ramirez Ortiz hijacks National Airlines Flight 337, a Convair 440, from Miami International Airport to Cuba.
- July 3, 1961 A Cubana DC-3 is hijacked by 14 people and diverted to Miami.
- July 24, 1961 Eastern Air Lines Flight 202, a Lockheed L-188 Electra, is hijacked to Cuba.
- July 31, 1961 Pacific Air Lines Flight 327, a DC-3, is hijacked by Bruce Britt Sr., demanding to be taken to Cuba. The pilot and a ticket agent were both shot by the hijacker, who was overpowered by the copilot and three passengers while the plane was on the ground.
- August 3, 1961 Continental Air Lines Flight 54, a Boeing 707, is unsuccessfully hijacked to Cuba. President John F. Kennedy orders that the tires be shot out while the plane is on the ground in El Paso. The plane is later destroyed in a suicide bombing the next year.
- August 9, 1961 Pan Am Flight 501, a DC-8, is hijacked to Cuba. On the same day, a Cubana C-46 experienced an attempted hijacking by 5 Cubans. Two guards on the plane tried to stop the hijacking. A gun battle killed the captain, a hijacker and one guard. The plane made an emergency landing in a sugar cane field. The remaining four hijackers fled the scene.
- October 26, 1965 National Airlines Flight 209, a Lockheed L-188 Electra, is hijacked by a Cuban with a pellet gun. Wanting to rescue his family in Havana, he is taken down by the crew with a fire axe.
- November 17, 1965 National Airlines Flight 30, a DC-8, experiences an attempted hijack by a 16-year-old boy armed with a gun demanding to be taken to Cuba. He fired six shots through the floor before being overpowered by a passenger.
- March 27, 1966 Angel María Betancourt Cueto, armed with a pistol, tries to hijack a Cubana Ilyushin Il-18 (CU-T831) from Santiago de Cuba to Havana, with 97 persons, in an attempt to reach the U.S. The pilot, Fernando Álvarez Pérez, opposed the hijacking and landed in Havana. The hijacker then killed Álvarez and armed guard Edor Reyes, seriously wounding the copilot Evans Rosales. The event had a large effect on Cubans. The hijacker later was caught and executed.
- November 20, 1967 Louis Gabor Babler, born in Hungary, successfully hijacks a Crescent Airline Piper Apache from Hollywood, Florida to Cuba; the plane was scheduled to go to the Bahamas.

=== 1968 ===
- February 17 Thomas J. Boynton hijacks a private charter Piper Apache from Marathon, Florida to Cuba. He returned to the United States via Canada on November 1, 1969, and was sentenced to 20 years for kidnapping.
- February 21 Lawrence Rhodes hijacked Delta Air Lines Flight 843, a DC-8, from Tampa, Florida to Cuba with 108 other crew and passengers aboard, including golfer Barbara Romack. Cuban authorities provided the passengers with lemonade, coffee, cigarettes, and pictures of Che Guevara and the plane was released after three hours. Rhodes surrendered in Spain on February 10, 1970. A January 4, 1971 hijacking charge against him is dismissed; he was committed to a mental institution; on July 8, 1971, he returns to prison; he is sentenced to 25 years for robbery on July 17, 1972.
- March 5 Three people hijacked an Avianca C-54 (HK-136) and diverted to Santiago, Cuba.
- March 12 Three Cubans hijack National Airlines Flight 28, a DC-8 from Tampa, Florida to Cuba; all are fugitives.
- March 21 An Avensa Convair 440 is hijacked to Cuba by three passengers.
- June 19 A VIASA DC-9 from Miami is hijacked 15 minutes after takeoff from Santo Domingo and diverted to Santiago, Cuba.
- June 29 Southeast Airlines Flight 101 is hijacked by one person and diverted to Cuba.
- July 1 Velasquez Fonseca, born in Cuba, hijacks Northwest Orient Airlines Flight 714, a Boeing 727, from Chicago to Cuba.
- July 12 Leonard Bendicks hijacks a Cessna 210 from Key West, Florida, to Cuba. He is deported to the U.S. in September 1968. On March 4, 1971, he is sentenced to 10 years for kidnapping.
- July 17 Hernandez Leyva, a Cuban, hijacks National Airlines Flight 1064, a DC-8, from Los Angeles to Cuba.
- August 4 Jessie Willis hijacks a Cessna 182 from Naples, Florida to Cuba; he returns voluntarily via Mexico on January 10, 1969; he is sentenced to 10 years for kidnapping; he is paroled on July 28, 1971.
- August 22 Bill McBride hijacks a Cessna 336 from Nassau to Cuba.
- September 20 Eastern Air Lines Flight 950, a Boeing 720, is hijacked to Cuba.
- October 6 A Mexican-owned Hawker Siddeley HS 748 is hijacked by three passengers to Cuba.
- October 23 Alben Truitt, the grandson of former U.S. Vice President Alben Barkley, hijacks a Cessna 177 from Key West to Cuba; he returns via Canada in February 1969; he is sentenced to 20 years for aircraft piracy and 20 years for kidnapping (to run consecutively).
- November 4 Raymond Johnson hijacks National Airlines Flight 186, a Boeing 727, from New Orleans to Cuba.
- November 23 Five Cubans hijack a Boeing 727 from Chicago to Cuba.
- November 24 Three Cubans hijack a Boeing 707 from New York to Cuba.
- November 30 Montesino Sanchez, a Cuban, hijacks a Boeing 720 from Miami to Cuba.
- December 5 Eduardo Castera hijacks a Boeing 727 from Tampa to Cuba.
- December 11 Two men hijack a DC-8 from St. Louis to Cuba.

=== 1969 ===
- January 2, 1969 Two Americans, a man and woman, hijack a DC-8 from New York to Cuba. The hijackers, Tyrone Ellington Austin and Linda Joyce Austin, eventually returned to the US. Tyrone Ellington was killed during an altercation with police in 1971, and Linda Joyce was arrested in 1988 and spent 6 months in prison after it was discovered that she participated in the hijacking.
- January 9 Ronald Bohle, a 21-year-old Purdue University student, hijacks a Boeing 727 from Miami to Cuba; he returns via Canada on November 1, 1969, and is sentenced to 20 years for air piracy on July 6, 1972.
- January 11 A man hijacks a 727 from Jacksonville, Florida to Cuba; he returns via Canada on May 5, 1969; he is acquitted of air piracy and kidnapping on grounds of temporary insanity.
- January 13 A man unsuccessfully attempts to hijack a Convair 880 from Detroit to Cuba; he is sentenced on July 31, 1969, to 15 years for interference with a flight crew; he had a history of mental illness.
- January 17 A man from the Dominican Republic hijacks a DC-8 from New York to Cuba.
- January 24, 1969 A man hijacks a Boeing 727 from Key West to Cuba; he was a 19-year-old Navy deserter who "didn't want to go to Vietnam".
- January 28 Two men successfully hijack a DC-8 from Los Angeles to Cuba; they are prison escapees.
- January 31 Allan Sheffield hijacks a DC-8 from San Francisco to Cuba; he says he is "tired of TV dinners and tired of seeing people starve in the world".
- February 3 A 21-year-old student and his girlfriend attempt to hijack a plane from New York City to Cuba; when the pilot refuels in Miami, the hijackers allow the passengers to deplane; the police capture the hijackers.
- February 3 Two Cubans hijack a 727 from Newark, New Jersey, to Cuba. Candid Camera creator Allen Funt was a passenger on the flight, and because other passengers recognized him, they assumed and believed that the hijacking was a stunt for the show, despite his protestations. Funt and others were later released after 11 hours of being held captive.
- February 10 A man born in Cuba hijacks a DC-8 from Atlanta to Cuba.
- February 25 A man hijacks a DC-8 from Atlanta to Cuba; he surrenders to U.S. authorities in Prague, CSR, in September 1969; he is sentenced to life imprisonment on July 7, 1970.
- March 6 Black Panther Tony Bryant (d. 1999 at 60) hijacks a National Airlines plane en route from New York to Miami and directed it to Cuba. He was arrested in Cuba and spent 10 years in a Cuban prison after being suspected of being a CIA agent. The US Government pardoned Bryant after his return in 1980. His 1984 book "Hijack" described his experience in Cuban prisons.

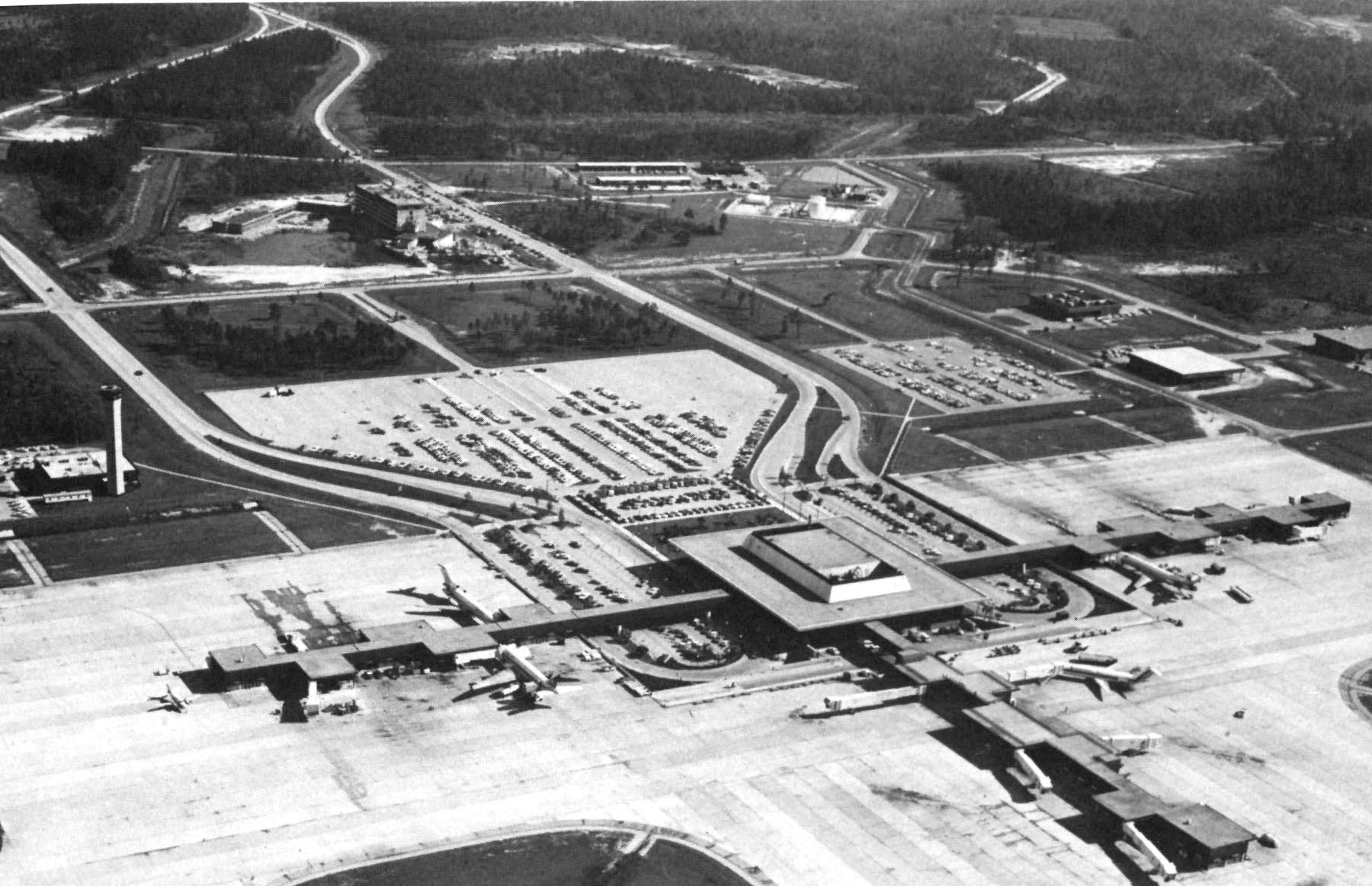
Jacksonville airport Florida

- March 17 A man hijacks an airliner from Atlanta to Cuba; he returns via Canada on November 1, 1969; he is committed to a mental institution on February 1, 1972; he is released on second 18-month furlough on December 5, 1973.
- March 19 A man tries to hijack a CV-880 from Dallas to Cuba; he ends up in New Orleans; charges are dismissed due to insanity.
- March 26 A man hijacked a Delta Air Lines Flight 821 (DC-8) from Dallas, Tex. bringing all 114 passengers to Havana, Cuba, many of which were active duty military.
- May 5 Jean-Pierre Charette and Alain Alard (members of the Front de Libération du Québec) successfully hijack a Boeing 727 from New York to Cuba.
- May 23 Three men born in Cuba successfully hijack a 727 from Miami to Cuba.
- June 17 A man hijacks a 707 from Oakland to Cuba.
- June 22 A man born in Cuba hijacks a DC-8 from Newark, N.J., to Cuba.
- June 25 A man successfully hijacks a DC-8 from Los Angeles to Cuba.
- June 28 A man successfully hijacks a 727 from Baltimore to Cuba. He returns via Canada in November 1969; he is sentenced to 15 years for interference with a flight crew on October 6, 1970.
- July 26 A man hijacks a DC-8 from El Paso, Texas, to Cuba. He returns via Canada on November 1, 1969; he is sentenced to 50 years for aircraft piracy on September 14, 1970.
- July 31 A man successfully hijacks a 727 from Pittsburgh to Cuba.
- August 5 A man unsuccessfully tries to hijack a DC-9 from Philadelphia to Cuba; charges are dismissed on January 12, 1970; he is committed to a mental institution; he is discharged on September 15, 1971.
- August 14 Two Cubans hijack a 727 from Boston to Cuba.
- August 29 A Cuban hijacks a 727 from Miami to Cuba.
- September 7 A man hijacks a DC-8 from New York to Cuba.
- September 10 A Puerto Rican unsuccessfully tries to hijack a DC-8 (scheduled for San Juan) to Cuba; he is committed to mental institution on January 30, 1970; he is released in December 1971.
- September 24 A Cuban hijacks a DC-8 from Charleston, South Carolina to Cuba.
- October 9 A man hijacks a DC-8 from Los Angeles to Cuba.
- October 21 A man hijacks a Boeing 720 from Mexico City to Cuba. He committed suicide in Cuba on September 28, 1970.
- November 4 Two armed men seize a Nicaraguan airliner en route from Miami to Mexico; they divert it to Cuba.
- December 26 M. Martinez (alias) hijacks a 727 from New York to Cuba.

== 1970s ==
=== 1970 ===
- February 16 A man who was born in Cuba, with wife and two children, successfully hijacks a 727 from Newark to Cuba.
- March 11 A man hijacks a 727 from Cleveland to Cuba; he is imprisoned in Cuba for attempting to escape; he is fatally shot escaping from prison on March 26, 1973.
- April 22 In 1966 Ira David Meeks was diagnosed with paranoid schizophrenia. April 1970 he hijacked a plane on a sightseeing tour with his wife pulling a gun at the pilot demanding to be flown to Cuba. Meeks told Cuban authorities "he felt persecuted as a black man in America and had heard that things would be better in Cuba." Cuba suspected him of being a spy and deported him 1976. On arrival he was arrested for the hijacking by the FBI. He was freed in 1981 after spending years in jail and a mental hospital.
- May 25 A man successfully hijacks a 727 from Chicago to Cuba.
- July 1 George Lopez hijacks a DC-8 from Las Vegas to Cuba.
- August 2 A man armed with a pistol and nitroglycerin hijacks Pan Am Flight 229, Clipper Victor, bound for San Juan from New York to Cuba. This was the first hijacking of the newly introduced Boeing 747 to Cuba and Premiere Fidel Castro came out to Havana's José Martí Airport to see the new airliner for himself. Castro reportedly met in person with the Pan Am pilot Captain Augustus Watkins and expressed concerns over the ability of the big plane to take off safely from the small airport but was reassured by the Pan Am captain.
- August 19 Three men (two born in Cuba, one born in Spain) hijack a DC-3 from Newark to Cuba (the plane's destination was San Juan).
- August 20 A man successfully hijacks a DC-9 from Atlanta to Cuba.
- August 25 TWA Flight 134 bound for Philadelphia from Las Vegas was hijacked to Cuba following a stopover in Chicago. The hijacker was a Vietnam Vet, Robert Labadie and was the first hijacker returned to the US the month following the incident. The Boeing 727, with 80 passengers and a 6-person crew, landed in a field in Pittsburgh to refuel, then proceeded on to Havana's José Martí Airport, landing at 10:21 p.m.
- September 19 A man successfully hijacks an Allegheny Airlines 727 from Pittsburgh to Cuba with a pistol and home made bomb.
- October 30 L. Rosas hijacks a DC-8 from Miami to Cuba.
- November 1 A man born in Mexico successfully hijacks a 727 from San Diego to Cuba; he has two children with him.
- November 13 A man hijacks an airliner from Raleigh to Cuba.
- December 19 A man attempts to hijack a DC-9 from Albuquerque to Cuba. He is taken into custody at Tulsa; he is sentenced to 5 years subject to a medical mental examination for conveying false information about an attempt to commit air piracy.

=== 1971 ===
- January 22, 1971 A man successfully hijacks a 727 from Milwaukee, Wisconsin, to Cuba; he would have gone to Algeria, if possible.
- February 4 A man successfully hijacks a DC-9 from Chicago to Cuba.
- February 25 A man successfully hijacks a 727 from San Francisco to Cuba or Canada; he ends up in Canada; he is deported on March 8, 1971; he is sentenced to 10 years for interference with a flight crew.
- March 31 A man born in Venezuela successfully hijacks a DC-8 from New York to Cuba; he returns to the United States via Bermuda on October 8, 1974.

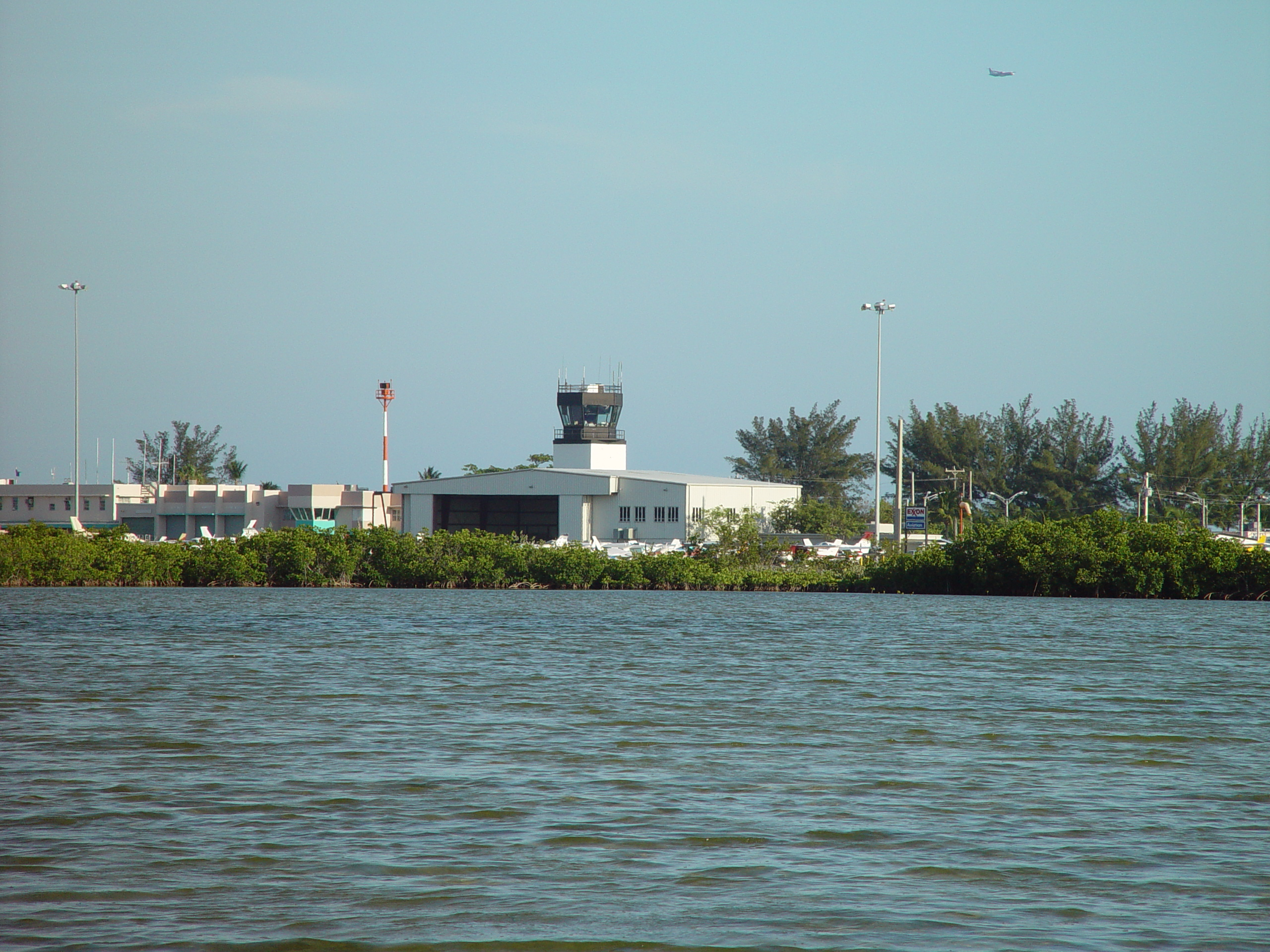
Key West International Airport Florida

- April 5 A former Cuban hijacks a Cessna 402 from Key West to Cuba.
- July 11 A Cubana de Aviación aircraft is hijacked at Cienfuegos, Cuba (Cienfuegos Airport) resulting in one fatality. The two hijackers were taken down and the hijacking lasted less than one day.
- July 24 A man born in Cuba successfully hijacks a DC-8 from Miami to Cuba, a stewardess and a passenger are wounded.
- September 3 A man born in Cuba, attempts to hijack a plane from Chicago to Cuba; he is sentenced to 20 years for interference with a flight crew on March 6, 1972.
- October 9 Richard Frederick Dixon forces his way aboard Eastern Airlines Flight 953 in Detroit and hijacks it to Cuba. No passengers or crew were injured though Dixon shot and killed a police officer in 1976 and was later convicted of air piracy, kidnapping, and murder.
- October 18 A man born in Canada, unsuccessfully attempts to hijack a Boeing 737 from Anchorage to Cuba; the attempt ends in Vancouver; he is deported to the United States on October 19, 1971, and is sentenced to 20 years for air piracy on May 12, 1972.
- October 25 A man born in Puerto Rico successfully hijacks an American Airlines Boeing 747 from New York to Cuba; the plane was bound for San Juan.
- October 29 A man, his two sons, and a third youth hijack an Eastern Air Lines jet from Houston to Havana. They kill a ticket agent during seizure of plane.
- November 27 Three members of the group Republic of New Afrika who had murdered a New Mexico State Policeman on November 8 hijacked TWA Flight 106, a Boeing 727, from Albuquerque to Havana. Passengers were released in Tampa.

=== 1972 ===
- January 7, 1972 A man and a woman hijack a 727 from San Francisco to Cuba.
- March 7 Two men force their way aboard a Chalk's Flying Service Grumman 73 (G/A) in Miami, Florida, wounding the pilot, a mechanic, and a bystander. They hijack the plane to Cuba.
- March 19 A man and a woman successfully hijack a Cessna 206 from Key West to Cuba.
- May 4–6 Michael Hansen hijacks a Boeing 737 flight from Salt Lake City to Los Angeles; he wants to go to Hanoi or Cuba; he goes to Cuba.
- October 29 Four men force their way aboard an aircraft. They kill a ticket agent, wound a ramp serviceman, and hijack a plane to Cuba.
- November 10 Melvin C. Cale, Louis Cale, and Henry D. Jackson, Jr. successfully hijack Southern Airways Flight 49 from Birmingham to multiple locations in the United States, including Cleveland, Ohio, Knoxville, Tennessee, and Chattanooga, Tennessee; Toronto, Canada, and finally to Cuba with $2 million in ransom (actual cash, Presidential "grant" totaled $10 million) and 10 parachutes. Co-pilot Harold is shot and wounded by the hijackers; they threaten to crash the plane into one of the Oak Ridge nuclear installations; at McCoy Air Force Base, in Orlando, the FBI shoots out two tires; the hijackers force pilot William Haas to take off; the DC-9 finally lands on a (partially) foam-covered runway in Havana; Jackson and Louis Cale are sentenced in Cuba to 20 years, Melvin Cale to 15 years, then returned to the United States to face further charges. This incident leads to a brief treaty between the U.S. and Cuba to extradite hijackers, not renewed. Haas's story commemorated in the Reader's Digest book People in Peril

=== 1974 ===
- December 14, 1974 Robin Harrison charters a plane by phone. On arrival at the airport office in Tampa, he points gun at the pilot of a Piper Seneca and demands a flight to Cuba.

=== 1978 ===
- March 13, 1978 Hijacker Clay Thomas hijacked United Flight 696 out of San Francisco. He claimed to have a high explosive filled pipe bomb and wanted to go to Cuba. Flight 696 landed at Oakland and after the passengers and cabin crew disembarked, began fueling for the flight to Cuba. Surrounded by police cars, Thomas panicked, stopped the refueling, and forced the crew to take off.

En route, Flight 696 landed in Denver to take on more fuel. While waiting for the fuel truck, the crew escaped the cockpit by jumping from the open cockpit windows. Without hostages, Thomas quickly surrendered to the FBI.

The Seattle-based crew, which included Captain Alan Grout, First Officer Jack Bard, and Second Officer Luke Warfield were all injured during the escape. They subsequently recovered and returned to flight duty during the following months.

=== 1979 ===
- June 12, 1979 Delta Air Lines Flight 1061, an L-1011 piloted by Captain Vince Doda, is hijacked by Eduardo Guerra Jimenez, a former Cuban air force pilot who had hijacked a MIG jet to the United States 10 years earlier.

== 1980s ==
- January 25, 1980 A Delta Air Lines with 65 passengers and crew members is hijacked to Cuba.
- September 13, 1980 A Delta Air Lines from New Orleans, bound for Atlanta, is hijacked. The pilot (William Borchert) flew to Havana, the hijackers were removed from the plane and the flight, with 81 passengers, continued to Atlanta.
- March 27, 1984 William Potts hijacked a Piedmont Airlines flight originally destined to leave from Newark, N.J. and to land in Miami, Florida. Potts identified himself as Lt. Spartacus of the Black Liberation Army and forced the pilot to fly to Havana, Cuba, claiming to have explosives on the airplane. Cuban officials arrested Potts, who then served 13 years in a Cuban prison for air piracy.
- December 31, 1984 An American Airlines DC-10 from Saint Croix, U.S. Virgin Islands (STX) bound for New York City (JFK) is hijacked to Havana. The hijacker (Ismail La Beet), a convicted perpetrator of the Fountain Valley massacre, was confirmed to be living at large in Cuba following an indeterminate amount of time spent in a Cuban prison. A documentary about him, The Skyjacker's Tale, premiered at the Toronto International Film Festival in 2016.
- March 11, 1987 A Cubana de Aviación Antonov 24RV (CU-T1262) on a scheduled domestic passenger flight from Nueva Gerona (Rafael Cabrera Airport), Cuba is hijacked. The hijacker was taken down and there was one fatality.

== 1990s ==
- February 4, 1992 Luis Rodríguez hijacks a plane from Cuba with other eight people. The plane ran out of fuel and fell to the sea near the Florida keys. There were no survivors.
- November 15, 1993 Alvarez Manuel & Alvaro Dominguez flew a Russian-built AN-2 biplane on a four-hour, zig-zag course to confuse Cuban radar. Guided by a U.S. Coast Guard interceptor, he landed just before dawn at Opa-Locka Airport just north of Miami.
- June 7, 1996 Lieutenant Colonel José Fernández Pupo hijacks a Cubana An-2 with 10 passengers, flying from Bayamo to Santiago de Cuba, demanding at gunpoint to land in Guantanamo Bay Naval Base. On May 29, 1997, he was declared not guilty by U.S. courts.
- July 26, 1996 Iberia Airlines Flight 6621 McDonnell-Douglas DC-10 flying from Madrid to Havana with 286 people aboard is forced to land in Miami by Lebanese National Saado Ibrahim, threatening the use of a bomb, later found to be fake. No one is injured.
- August 16, 1996 Commercial pilot Adel Given Ulloa and two other workers of Aerotaxi, Leonardo Reyes and José Roberto Bello, force pilot Adolfo Pérez Pantoja to fly to the United States. The plane ran out of fuel in the Florida Straits and fell to the sea 50 km (30 miles) south of Fort Myers. They were collected by a Russian ship. The three were declared not guilty of hijacking by a court in Tampa. All remained in the U.S.

== 2000s ==
- September 19, 2000 – An Antonov An-2 crashes into the sea west of Cuba. Cuban authorities said the plane was hijacked after take-off from Pinar del Río.
- July 31, 2001 – John Milo Reese steals a plane from Florida Keys Marathon Airport with the reported intention of delivering a pizza to Fidel Castro in an attempt to kidnap the Cuban leader. After crash-landing on a Cuban beach, he was returned to the United States, where he was convicted of transporting a stolen aircraft, and was sentenced to six months in jail. In a later interview, he admitted to being slightly intoxicated and having lost his bearings in the air.
- August 14, 2001 – An elderly couple attempts to hijack a plane and force the pilot to fly to Cuba. In the ensuing scuffle the plane crashed into the sea near Florida and the couple drowned.
- November 11, 2002 – A Cuban An-2 aircraft, registration No. CU-C1086, is hijacked. The plane landed at the Pinar del Río airport before flying to Key West in Florida. It was the first hijacking attempt heading to Cuba since 9/11.
- March 19, 2003 – Six men, some armed with knives, take control of a Cuban state airline plane as it heads to Havana from Cuba's Isle of Youth. U.S. Air Force fighter jets intercepted the DC-3 plane, run by Cuban state airline Aerotaxi, shortly before it reached Florida late on Wednesday evening. The U.S. jets then escorted the plane to Key West's airport, where the suspects surrendered without incident.
- March 31, 2003 – A Cuban airliner is successfully hijacked to Key West with 32 people on board.
- April 1, 2003 – A man carrying two grenades hijacks a Cubana AN-24, registration No. CU-T1294, demanding that it fly to the United States; it landed in Havana due to insufficient fuel.

== See also ==
- Aircraft hijacking
- Cuba-United States relations
- Cubana Flight 455
- List of United States citizens granted political asylum in Cuba
