= List of Australians convicted of crimes =

This is a list of notable Australian people who have been convicted of serious crimes both in Australia and overseas. The criterion for notability is either an article on the individual, or the crime they were convicted of, in the English Wikipedia.

== Bank robbers ==
- Brenden Abbott (born 1962), known as the Postcard Bandit
- Darcy Dugan (1920–1991), bank robber and New South Wales' most notorious prison escape artist
- Keith Faure (born 1951), from Victoria, career criminal
- Victor Peirce (1958–2002), from Melbourne, member of the Pettingill family
- Gregory David Roberts (born 1952), former heroin addict and convicted bank robber who escaped and fled to India; author of Shantaram

== Child sex offenders ==
- Brett Peter Cowan, Australian murderer and child rapist who was convicted of the murder of Daniel Morcombe
- Mr Cruel, an unidentified Australian serial child rapist who attacked three girls and is suspected of murdering Karmein Chan in the northern and eastern suburbs of Melbourne, Victoria.
- Robert 'Dolly' Dunn (1941–2009), paedophile.
- Dennis Ferguson, paedophile.
- Rolf Harris, Australian entertainer convicted of multiple counts of indecent assault while living in the UK involving underage girls
- Robert Hughes, actor convicted of ten child sex offences committed against five young girls, sentenced to 10 years and 9 months with a non-parole period of six years. Deported to the United Kingdom following his release.
- Brian Keith Jones, aka "Mr Baldy", serial paedophile, jailed indefinitely in 2006 for breaches of parole
- Bernard McGrath, paedophile, a member of the Hospitaller Order of St John of God who had five separate criminal trials for his crimes against vulnerable children with mental and physical disabilities in New Zealand and Australia. McGrath's offending was so prolific the true number of his victims will never be known.
- Milton Orkopoulos, NSW state MP and child sex offender
- Patrick Power, Crown Prosecutor convicted of possessing child pornography
- Gerald Ridsdale, paedophile, Australian Catholic priest convicted of sexual abuse against many children.
- Peter Scully, paedophile convicted of abduction, human trafficking, rape, torture and murder, sentenced to life imprisonment in the Philippines.
- Gregory Sutton, paedophile, member of the Catholic religious order the Marist Brothers.

== Drug traffickers ==
- Dennis Allen (1951–1987) nicknamed "Mr. Death," member of the Pettingill family
- Bali Nine:
  - Andrew Chan, sentenced to death in Indonesia on 14 February 2006 and executed by firing squad on 29 April 2015
  - Si Yi Chen, sentenced to life imprisonment in Indonesia on 16 February 2006
  - Michael Czugaj, sentenced to life imprisonment in Indonesia on 14 February 2006
  - Renae Lawrence, sentenced to 20 years' imprisonment in Indonesia
  - Tan Duc Thanh Nguyen, sentenced to life imprisonment in Indonesia on 16 February 2006
  - Matthew Norman, sentenced to life imprisonment in Indonesia on 16 February 2006
  - Scott Rush, sentenced to life imprisonment in Indonesia on 13 February 2006
  - Martin Stephens, sentenced to life imprisonment in Indonesia in February 2006
  - Myuran Sukumaran, sentenced to death in Indonesia on 14 February 2006 and executed by firing squad on 29 April 2015
- Kevin Barlow and Brian Chambers, sentenced to death on 1 August 1985 and executed by hanging in Malaysia on 7 July 1986
- Nola Blake, sentenced to death in Thailand in 1988; sentence later commuted to life
- Schapelle Corby, served a 9-year prison sentence in Indonesia.
- Warren Fellows, drug courier sentenced to life imprisonment in Thailand in 1978
- Jim Krakouer, star AFL footballer imprisoned for 16 years on amphetamine trafficking charges
- Michael McAuliffe, executed in Malaysia
- David McMillan, smuggler, escaped from Thailand's notorious Bangkok Prison in 1996
- Van Tuong Nguyen (1980–2005), Vietnamese Australian executed in Singapore
- Victor Peirce (1958–2002), member of the Pettingill family, murdered in 2001
- Kath Pettingill, former brothel worker and owner; criminal matriarch of the Pettingill family
- Roger Rogerson, corrupt former police officer
- Stephen John Sutton, imprisoned in Argentina on drug charges
- Robert Trimbole (1931–2007), International felon and drug lord
- Andrew "Benji" Veniamin, murdered in 2004
- Carl Williams, murdered in 2010

== Families ==
Notable Australian criminal families:

- Moran family
  - Jason Moran
  - Lewis Moran
  - Mark Moran
- Pettingill family
  - Dennis Allen
  - Kath Pettingill
  - Victor Peirce

== Fraudsters ==
- Rodney Adler, Sydney-based fraudster imprisoned for his role in transactions to hide the true financial status of FAI Insurance
- Hajnal Ban, defrauded an elderly man with a mental incapacity of $660,000
- Alan Bond, English-Australian businessman imprisoned for three years in 1996 for fraud
- Brian Burke, former Western Australia Premier imprisoned for rorting travel expenses
- Michael Cobb, former politician convicted of fraud after rorting travel expenses
- Laurie Connell, gaoled for conspiring to pervert the course of justice
- Peter Foster, one of Australia's most famous conmen, gaoled for fraud
- Simon Hannes, insider trading ahead of takeover of TNT in 1996
- Theresa Lawson (1951–2004), former Sydney Woolworths payroll clerk imprisoned for stealing $2.6 million
- Bon Levi, conman
- Ray O'Connor, former WA Premier imprisoned for stealing
- David Parker, former WA Deputy Premier imprisoned for perjury for evidence given to WA Inc royal commission
- Rene Rivkin (1944–2005), stockbroker imprisoned on insider trading charges
- Christopher Skase (1948–2001), failed businessman and fugitive who escaped to Mallorca
- Andrew Theophanous, bribery and fraud offences relating to assisting in visa applications as a Member of Parliament
- Craig Thomson, fraud against the Health Services Union for sexual purposes and gratification
- Glenn Wheatley (1948–2022), Musician and talent manager gaoled for tax evasion
- Ray Williams, fraud related to the collapse of HIH Insurance

== Gangsters ==
- George Freeman, Sydney gangster
- Alphonse Gangitano, associate of Jason Moran, murdered
- Mick Gatto, Melbourne underworld figure, active during the Melbourne gangland killings
- John "Chow" Hayes, violent criminal who became known as Australia's first gangster
- Michael Kanaan, multiple murderer and gang member
- Lenny McPherson, Sydney gangster
- Tony Mokbel, serving a 12-year sentence, awaiting further charges
- Jason Moran (1967–2003), killed by rival gangster Carl Williams in a gang war
- Lewis Moran (1941–2004), killed by rival gangster Carl Williams in a gang war
- Mark Moran (1964–2000), killed by rival gangster Carl Williams in a gang war
- Michael Odisho, DLASTHR and Brothers for Life underworld Sydney gangster
- Nikolai Radev (1959–2003), killed in gang war
- Abraham Saffron (1919–2006), Hotelier, nightclub owner and property developer. King of Kings Cross, Sydney gangster
- Squizzy Taylor (1888–1927), Melbourne gangster of the 1920s and before
- Andrew Veniamin (1975–2004), killed in gang war by Mick Gatto
- Mark "Chopper" Read (1954–2013), multiple convictions including attempted murder, armed robbery, assault and kidnapping

== Murderers ==
- Dante Arthurs, murdered Sofia Rodriguez-Urrutia-Shu
- James Beauregard-Smith, convicted triple murderer and rapist
- Kenneth Brown, explorer and pastoralist hanged for murdering his wife
- Martin Bryant, convicted of 35 murders in the Port Arthur massacre
- Bevan Spencer von Einem, murderer
- Keith Faure, convicted Melbourne gangland killings murderer
- Christopher Dale Flannery, (born c. 1948, disappeared May 1985) known as "Mr-Rent-A-Kill", rapist and armed robber who shot an undercover policeman
- Sef Gonzales, murdered his mother, father and sister
- Maddison Hall, murdered a hitchhiker
- Ned Kelly (1854/1855–1880), Victorian bushranger murdered three troopers (policemen), as well as former friend turned police informer Aaron Sherritt
- Julian Knight, perpetrator of the Hoddle Street massacre
- Katherine Knight, murdered her de facto husband John Charles Thomas Price on 29 February 2000; first Australian woman to be sentenced to life imprisonment without parole
- Keli Lane, convicted of the 1996 murder of her newborn daughter Tegan on 13 December 2010
- Martin Leach, bound, gagged and stabbed Charmaine Aviet and bound, gagged, stabbed, raped and slit the throat of her cousin Janice Carnegie, both teenagers, before burying their bodies
- Francesco Mangione, the Mr Whippy ice-cream turf war murderer
- Craig Minogue, convicted of the Russell Street bombing
- Bradley John Murdoch, convicted for the murder of Peter Falconio
- Derek Percy, convicted child killer linked to the mysterious deaths of at least nine other children in the 1960s.
- Anthony Perish, convicted of murdering Terry Falconer
- Ronald Ryan, convicted of killing prison guard George Hodson. Ryan was the last person executed in Australian in 1967; whether he was innocent of the murder is debated.
- Joseph Schwab (1960–1987), murdered five tourists across the Northern Territory and Western Australia in 1987
- Neddy Smith (1944–2021), convicted of the murder of Sydney brothel owner, Harvey Jones
- John Travers, convicted ringleader of the Anita Cobby murder
- Brenton Tarrant, convicted of the Christchurch mosque shootings in 2019.
- Erin Patterson, convicted in 2025 for the Leongatha mushroom murders.
- Carl Williams, convicted of murdering three people and suspected of killing, or ordering the killing of, many more in the Melbourne gangland killings.

== Rapists ==
- Peter Dupas, serial killer
- Raymond Edmunds, known as Mr Stinky or the Donvale Rapist
- Bilal Skaf, gang leader who led the Sydney gang rapes
- Catherine Birnie, rape and murder of four women in Perth in 1986
- Leonard Fraser, also known as "The Rockhampton Rapist"; killed four to seven women in Rockhampton, Queensland

== Serial killers ==
- Catherine Birnie, rape and murder of four women in Perth in 1986
- David Birnie (1951–2005), rape and murder of four women in Perth in 1986
- Gregory Brazel, shot dead a woman in 1982 armed robbery, and murdered two sex workers in 1990
- John Bunting, Adelaide-based serial killer, with partners Robert Wagner and James Vlassakis was responsible for the murder of 12 victims known as the Snowtown murders or bodies in a barrel murders.
- Robert Francis Burns, murdered eight men between 1876 and 1881 in Victoria and New South Wales
- Eric Edgar Cooke, The Nedlands monster
- Bandali Debs, convicted of murdering two police officers and two sex workers in the 1990s
- Paul Denyer, Melbourne-based serial killer during the early 1990s dubbed the "Frankston Serial Killer"
- Peter Dupas, Melbourne-based serial killer who killed several times upon release from prison
- Bradley Robert Edwards; convicted of killing two women and suspected of killing a third in Claremont, Western Australia during 1996–1997.
- Leonard Fraser, also known as "The Rockhampton Rapist"; killed four to seven women in Rockhampton, Queensland
- John Wayne Glover (1932–2005), the Sydney North Shore granny murderer
- Caroline Grills (c.1888–1960), also known as "Auntie Thally"; serial poisoner of five family members
- Paul Steven Haigh, convicted of the murders of six people in the late 1970s and another in 1991; currently serving six life sentences without the possibility of parole
- Matthew James Harris, strangled a friend's brother, a female friend and a male neighbour to death over five weeks in 1998 in Wagga Wagga
- Thomas Jeffrey, Tasmanian penal colony escapee responsible for the murders of five people; executed in 1826
- Eddie Leonski, American serial killer known as the Brownout Strangler
- John Lynch, convicted of the murder of Kernes Landregan in 1842 near Berrima, New South Wales; prior to his execution he confessed to murdering ten people during the period 1836 to 1842.
- William MacDonald, also known as "the Mutilator"; killed at least five men between June 1961 and April 1963
- John and Sarah Makin, baby farmers convicted for the murder of Horace Amber Murray; suspected of the murders of 13 infants.
- Ivan Milat (1944–2019), convicted of the murder of seven young men and women between 1989 and 1993; known as Australia's most prolific serial killer. His crimes are collectively referred to as the "Backpacker murders".
- Martha Needle, poisoned five family members
- Martha Rendell, killed three stepchildren with hydrochloric acid in the 20th century; last woman to be hanged in Western Australia
- Lindsay Robert Rose, serial killer and contract killer who murdered five people between 1984 and 1994
- Arnold Sodeman, the schoolgirl strangler
- Christopher Worrell and James Miller. Miller was convicted of the Truro murders, the murder of seven people women and girls in 1976–1977. It was accepted in court that Worrell, who died in a car accident in 1977, physically committed the murders, and that Miller was guilty as part of a joint criminal enterprise.

== See also ==
- List of Australians imprisoned or executed abroad
- List of Australian politicians convicted of crimes
