= Si Yi Chen =

Chinese-Australian drug trafficker

- Born: 19 March 1985 (age 41)
- Known for: Member of the Bali Nine
- Status: Repatriated to Australia; released
- Conviction: Drug trafficking (2006)
- Penalty: Life imprisonment
- Accomplices: Andrew Chan; Michael Czugaj; Renae Lawrence; Tan Duc Thanh Nguyen; Matthew Norman; Scott Rush; Martin Stephens; Myuran Sukumaran

Details
- Imprisoned at: Kerobokan Prison, Bali, Indonesia

Si Yi Chen (simplified Chinese: 陈思毅; traditional Chinese: 陳思毅; pinyin: Chén Sīyì; born 19 March 1985) is an Australian man who was convicted in Indonesia for drug trafficking as a member of the Bali Nine. In 2005, Chen was arrested in a room at the Melasti Hotel in Kuta, Bali together with three others. Police uncovered 334 g (11.8 oz) of heroin in a suitcase in the room. After a criminal trial, on 15 February 2006 Chen was sentenced to life imprisonment. His appeal to the Indonesian Supreme Court to have the sentence reduced suffered a shock when the Supreme Court imposed the death penalty on 6 September 2006. A subsequent appeal to the Indonesian Supreme Court, following a full confession by Chen to his role in the plan to import heroin from Bali to Australia, resulted in the original sentence of life imprisonment being reinstated.

== Alleged trafficking conspiracy ==
It is unclear how Chen, aged 20 years, from Doonside in Sydney, was connected to the fellow members of the Bali Nine. According to media reports, acting on behalf of Myuran Sukumaran, on 5 April 2005 Chen handed Renae Lawrence A$500 at a Sydney hotel representing spending money for Lawrence's trip to Bali. On or about 8 April 2005, Chen arrived in Bali with Matthew Norman and checked into the White Rose Hotel. It was reported that Chen and Norman "hardly ever left their room".

On 14 April, Chen, Norman, Lawrence and Martin Stephens checked into Adhi Dharma hotel, with Tan Duc Thanh Nguyen arriving in the same hotel two days later. It was reported that police took the room next to Chen and Norman. In the evening of Sunday 17 April, appearing like tourists, Nguyen, Chen and Norman checked into the Melasti Hotel. Sukumaran, who was also with them, with his bags, left them with the others as he decided to go to the Hard Rock Hotel complex.

=== Arrest in Indonesia ===
Approximately 20 minutes after checking in, Chen was arrested at the Melasti Hotel in Kuta on 17 April 2005 with Nguyen, Sukumaran and Norman. Indonesian police claim the group were in possession of 334 g (11.8 oz) of heroin and bundles of plastic wrapping, Elastoplast tape, and a set of scales, indicating involvement in a plan to transport drugs to Australia.

Earlier that day at Ngurah Rai International Airport in Denpasar, Indonesian police also arrested the following drug mules after they were found carrying various amounts of heroin concealed on their bodies. Martin Stephens was found to be carrying 3.3 kg (7.3 lb); Renae Lawrence was found to be carrying 2.689 kg (5.93 lb); Michael Czugaj was found to be carrying 1.75 kg (3.9 lb) and Scott Rush was found to be carrying 1.3 kg (2.9 lb) of heroin. Alleged co-ringleader, Andrew Chan was also arrested the same day while seated on an Australian Airlines flight waiting to depart Denpasar for Sydney. At the time Chan was arrested, he was carrying three mobile phones and a boarding pass. No drugs were found in his possession.

Two weeks after leaving Australia, Chen's father reported him missing to Australian police and had no idea he was abroad; saying:

"I didn't see him for two weeks. I never knew he was overseas. I am very surprised to hear this news."

=== Criticism of Australian Federal Police tipoff ===
Lee Rush, the father of Scott Rush, a fellow member of the Bali Nine, said that he contacted the Australian Federal Police (AFP) prior to the commission of the offence, fearing his son was travelling to Bali and would commit a drug-related crime. Rush senior claims then to have received assurances from the AFP that they would tell his son he was under surveillance to dissuade him from going through with the crime before the group's departure from Indonesia. Scott Rush's lawyers said he was never contacted. It was revealed that the AFP alerted Indonesian police that a crime was to be committed approximately two weeks before the arrests, and had commenced an investigation about ten weeks prior to the arrests. When the Bali Nine were arrested, the news of the tipoff became public and there was criticism of the role of the AFP in protecting the interests of Australian citizens. Commenting on the matter at the time, AFP Commissioner Mick Keelty was reported as saying:

"One of the things we've got to remember is that we operate within our criminal-justice system here in Australia, and if we only co-operated with countries that had the same criminal-justice system, then our co-operation wouldn't extend very far beyond Australia. We have to work with the systems that operate in other countries, and to a large degree this has been successful, certainly in terms of heroin trafficking."

— Australian Federal Police Commissioner Mick Keelty, quoted in The Monthly, July 2007.

Rush took action in the Federal Court of Australia against the AFP for breach of the bilateral treaty between Indonesia and Australia when information was handed by the AFP to the Indonesians. Rush's case claimed that such information should only be released by the Attorney-General. However, the Commonwealth Government maintained that the treaty only applies after a suspect is charged. The application was dismissed by the Federal Court in January 2006.

== Criminal trial ==
Criminal trials for the accused commenced in the Denpasar District Court on 11 October 2005. Chen, Nguyen, and Norman, all arrested at the Melasti Hotel and earning the numeric epithet, The Melasti Three, were tried together, with the remaining six defendants tried separately. During the trial it was reported that Chen denied any involvement in the alleged drug trafficking operation. Chen was quiet throughout proceedings and at times could barely be heard by panel judges.

In December 2005, it was reported that tensions were building between the Bali Nine drug mules and Sukumaran and Chan. Several days later, lawyers acting for some members of the Bali Nine initially sought the support of the Director of Public Prosecutions to intervene and lay charges for conspiracy to import drugs, so that the nine could be extradited and charged under Australian law. However, the judges hearing the trial matters in Bali called for Australia not to intervene in Indonesia's right to impose capital punishment;. Lawyers acting for Stephens, one of the Bali Nine, claimed that the fairness of his trial was in jeopardy following comments made in the media by Indonesian Foreign Minister Hassan Wirajuda that Australians should be prepared for members of the Bali Nine to receive a death sentence, if found guilty.

=== Sentencing and appeal ===
In pre-sentence proceedings, Chen's father, Edward Chen, was reported as saying:

"If he has a chance to be saved, the judges could give him a light sentence and a chance to do good things.... I don't think he's guilty."

— Chen's father, Edward Chen, quoted prior to his sentencing, January 2006.

During his final plea on 2 February 2006, Chen said:

"I believe I was in the wrong place at the wrong time. My intention was to come to Bali for a holiday. I appeal to you to be merciful and give me a more lenient sentence. I don't want to spend the rest of my life in prison away from my family and friends for being in the wrong place at the wrong time."

— Chen, during his final plea prior to sentencing, February 2006.

On 15 February 2006 Chen was sentenced to life imprisonment. Commenting on the sentences at the time, Australian Federal Police Commissioner Keelty stated:

"I stand by the police and what they've done … The Federal Court actually made a decision saying not only had they acted lawfully but they acted in accordance with government policy."

— AFP Commissioner Mick Keelty, quoted in The Sydney Morning Herald, 15 February 2006.

The Australian Prime Minister John Howard was reported as commenting:

"The police are there to protect us from the ravages of drugs and I just hope that every young Australian who might in their wildest imagination think that they can get away with this will take a lesson from this." ...... "I feel desperately sorry for the parents of these people. I do. All of us as parents will feel that way, but the warnings have been there for decades."

— Australian Prime Minister John Howard, February 2006.

A subsequent appeal to the Indonesian Supreme Court to have the sentence reduced suffered a shock on 6 September 2006 when the death penalty was imposed on Chen, Nguyen, and Norman. Following a full confession by Chen during a subsequent appeal for leniency, the original sentence of life imprisonment being reinstated with some media reports that the Melasti Three could be released before 2020, subject to good behaviour.

== Additional arrests ==
In February 2006, as verdicts and sentences were handed down in the trial of the Bali Nine, additional arrests were made in Australia.

== Prison life ==
Chen served his sentence in Kerobokan Prison where he worked in partnership with a local jewellery company Yin Jewellery to establish Mule Jewels, a rehabilitative silver making programme that offers inmates a trade skill that they are able to use upon release, and gives inmates some constructive and therapeutic work. Chen has stated online that he is sharing a cell with an Australian and a Japanese person. "It's comfortable enough for the three of us but it is dirty." He has since become a Christian.

On 15 December 2024, Chen and the other four remaining members of the Bali Nine arrived back in Australia on a commercial flight. He will not be required to serve any further prison time in the country.

== See also ==
- List of Australians in international prisons
- List of Australian criminals
