= Myuran Sukumaran =

Australian drug trafficker (1981-2015)

- Born: 17 April 1981; London, England
- Died: 29 April 2015 (aged 34); Nusa Kambangan, Indonesia
- Known for: Bali Nine, drug trafficking
- Status: Executed by firing squad
- Conviction: Drug trafficking (2005)
- Penalty: Death
- Accomplices: Andrew Chan; Si Yi Chen; Michael Czugaj; Tan Duc Thanh Nguyen; Matthew Norman; Renae Lawrence; Scott Rush; Martin Stephens

Myuran Sukumaran (17 April 1981 – 29 April 2015) was an Australian who was convicted in Indonesia of drug trafficking as a member of the Bali Nine. In 2005, Sukumaran was arrested in a room at the Melasti Hotel in Kuta, Bali with eight others. Police found 334 g (11.8 oz) of heroin in a suitcase in the room. According to court testimonies of convicted drug mules, Sukumaran and Andrew Chan were the co-ringleaders of the heroin-smuggling operation from Indonesia to Australia. After a criminal trial, Sukumaran was sentenced on 14 February 2006 by the Denpasar District Court to execution by firing squad.

After lodging an appeal against his sentence, Sukumaran's appeal was initially dismissed by the Bali High Court. A judicial review by the Indonesian Supreme Court on 6 July 2011 affirmed the death sentence. Sukumaran's plea for clemency was rejected by the President of Indonesia Joko Widodo on 30 December 2014. He and Chan were executed on 29 April 2015.

== Early life and family ==
Myuran Sukumaran was born on 17 April 1981 in London. He was the eldest child of Sam and Raji Sukumaran who are Hindus of Sri Lankan Tamil origin. Sukumaran had a brother (Chintu) and a sister (Brintha). The family moved to Australia in 1985 and lived in Auburn, a western suburb of Sydney.

Sukumaran was educated at Homebush Boys High School where he was known as "Myu." Although Andrew Chan also attended Homebush, the pair were four years apart and mixed in different circles. Sukumaran told a psychiatrist that he faced bullying and racism at school. Only in his adolescence did he start making friends, mostly Chinese and Vietnamese, and started to feel accepted.

After dropping out of university in the first year of his course, Sukumaran worked as a mail-room clerk at State Street Corporation, an American investment bank, and at the passport office in Sydney. He started using drugs and, attracted by fast cars, nightclubs and instant rewards, got involved in drug selling after a university friend introduced him to the criminal world. Sukumaran met Andrew Chan at a friend's party in 2002 and got involved in smuggling drugs from Indonesia to Australia.

== Trafficking conspiracy ==
Media reports based on the testimony of co-conspirator Renae Lawrence claim that she met Sukumaran through Andrew Chan. Sometimes referred to in the media as a "martial arts expert" or "the enforcer", Sukumaran trained in Brazilian Jiu-Jitsu.

In an interview broadcast on SBS TV's Dateline program following his sentencing and appeal, Sukumaran said:

"Well, basically a friend of mine that I went to uni with asked me to come to a dinner and asked me if I wanted to join a gang. I sort of laughed at that. I was never involved in this in high school, yeah. I was, like, yeah, I'll come to dinner, sitting around dinner, they were talking about all this type of stuff. It was kind of funny to me, like, they pay for dinner and the nightclub afterwards and stuff like that so I was like "Yeah"...it's just the lifestyle, all the people that were living, you know you want to be like those people, get the girls like those people, and I was hoping to buy a car, hoping to start a business. Those are the sort of the things like I didn't see, like, myself working in the mail room for the next 50 years of my life. I thought "No, I can't do this", then you see all these people like in night clubs with nice BMWs, and nice Mercedes and there's always chicks there, and they was buying drinks for everyone and you think "Fuck", how do you do this on a mail room salary."

— Myuran Sukumaran, interviewed in 2010 and broadcast on SBS TV's Dateline following his sentencing and appeal.

According to Lawrence, following earlier alleged threats from Chan, on 5 April 2005 Sukumaran met with Si Yi Chen, Martin Stephens and Lawrence at a Sydney hotel where police allege drug smuggling tools such as sealable plastic bags, medical tape, elastic waist bands and skin tight bike shorts were stuffed into the bags of Stephens and Lawrence. Lawrence claimed she was given cash, whilst Stephens claimed that his life was threatened. The following day, Sukumaran allegedly provided another group with cash for airflight tickets.

On arrival in Bali, Sukumaran checked into the Hard Rock Hotel, where Chan had already arrived. Other members of the Bali Nine were staying at other hotels across Kuta. It is unclear what Sukumaran's movements were whilst in Bali. On the evening of 17 April, appearing like tourists, Tan Duc Thanh Nguyen, Chen and Matthew Norman checked into the Melasti Hotel. Sukumaran, who was also with them with his bags, left the bags with the others as he decided to go back to the Hard Rock Hotel complex.

=== Arrest ===
Sukumaran was arrested on 17 April 2005, the day of his 24th birthday, at the Melasti Hotel in Kuta with Tan Duc Thanh Nguyen, Si Yi Chen and Matthew Norman. Indonesian police claim the group were in possession of 334 g (11.8 oz) of heroin and bundles of plastic wrapping, Elastoplast tape, and a set of scales, indicating involvement in a plan to transport drugs to Australia.

Earlier that day at Ngurah Rai International Airport in Denpasar, Indonesian police also arrested the following drug mules after they were found carrying various amounts of heroin concealed on their bodies. Martin Stephens was found to be carrying 3.3 kg (7.3 lb), Renae Lawrence was found to be carrying 2.689 kg (5.93 lb), Michael Czugaj was found to be carrying 1.75 kg (3.9 lb), and Scott Rush was found to be carrying 1.3 kg (2.9 lb) of heroin. Alleged co-ringleader, Andrew Chan, was also arrested the same day whilst seated on an Australian Airlines flight waiting to depart Denpasar for Sydney. At the time Chan was arrested, he was carrying three mobile phones and a boarding pass. No drugs were found in his possession.

Sukumaran denied any involvement with the heroin seized at the airport or any heroin located at the premises upon his arrest. Up until his arrest in Indonesia, Australian and Indonesian police did not know the identity of the man. Indonesian police speculated that Sukumaran was Chan's bodyguard, because they were always together.

=== Criticism of Australian Federal Police tipoff ===
Lee Rush, the father of Scott Rush, a fellow member of the Bali Nine, said that he contacted the Australian Federal Police (AFP) prior to the commission of the offence, fearing his son was travelling to Bali and would commit a drug-related crime. Rush senior said he received assurances from the AFP that it would tell his son he was under surveillance to dissuade him from going through with the crime before the group's departure from Indonesia.

Scott Rush's lawyers said he was never contacted. It was revealed that the AFP alerted Indonesian police that a crime was to be committed approximately two weeks before the arrests, and had commenced an investigation about ten weeks prior to the arrests. When the Bali Nine were arrested, the news of the tipoff became public and there was criticism of the role of the AFP in protecting the interests of Australian citizens. Commenting on the matter at the time, AFP Commissioner Mick Keelty was reported as saying:

"One of the things we've got to remember is that we operate within our criminal-justice system here in Australia, and if we only co-operated with countries that had the same criminal-justice system, then our co-operation wouldn't extend very far beyond Australia. We have to work with the systems that operate in other countries, and to a large degree this has been successful, certainly in terms of heroin trafficking."

— Australian Federal Police Commissioner Mick Keelty, quoted in The Monthly in July 2007.

Rush took action in the Federal Court of Australia against the AFP for breach of the bilateral treaty between Indonesia and Australia when information was handed by the AFP to the Indonesians. Rush's case claimed that such information should only be released by the Attorney-General. However, the Commonwealth Government maintained that the treaty only applies after a suspect is charged. The application was dismissed by the Federal Court in January 2006.

In 2015, Nick Xenophon, Clive Palmer and Cathie McGowan announced they would support a private member's bill to impose jail terms on public officials who disclose information that could lead to the execution of Australians overseas, with a maximum prison sentence of 15 years.

== Trial ==
Criminal trials for the accused commenced in the Denpasar District Court on 11 October 2005. Chen, Nguyen, and Norman were tried together, with Sukumaran being one of the remaining six defendants tried separately. In December 2005, as the trials began, it was reported that tensions were building between the Bali Nine drug mules and Sukumaran and Chan. Several days later, lawyers acting for some members of the Bali Nine initially sought the support of the Director of Public Prosecutions to intervene and lay charges for conspiracy to import drugs, so that the nine could be extradited and charged under Australian law. However, the judges hearing the trial matters in Bali called for Australia not to intervene in Indonesia's right to impose capital punishment, with Australian lawyers counter-claiming that the fairness of the trial was in jeopardy.

During the trial of Czugaj, Sukumaran refused to give testimony, stating "...I am also on trial." During his trial, Sukumaran denied knowing Czugaj and Rush, or any knowledge of a heroin importation plan, and frequently blamed amnesia for his inability to remember events leading to his arrest. Sukumaran denied signing police statements, and when asked by judges to sign his name as an example of his signature, signed his name in four different styles. During his testimony, Sukumaran claimed he met Nguyen on the flight to Bali, and went out drinking with him, Chen, Norman and Chan whilst in Bali.

=== Sentencing and appeal ===
On 24 January 2006, prosecutors called for the death penalty to be handed down on Sukumaran, the first time a demand of death was put forward by prosecutors for any of the Bali Nine. Days later, prosecutors advanced the same call followed for Chan. Prosecutors told a Bali court there was no reason to show any leniency towards Sukumaran because he helped organise the heroin smuggling operation. Prosecutors also claimed Sukumaran and Chan strapped heroin to the bodies of the fellow accused. Indonesian police identified Sukumaran as one of the main players in what they say was a major smuggling ring.

Sukumaran was found guilty of drug trafficking on 14 February 2006 by three judges in the Denpasar District Court, who sentenced him to death by firing squad.

Despite being relatively free of emotion during criminal proceedings, on the day verdicts were handed down, Sukumaran lunged at photographers. The sentencing was carried live on Australian television as Sukumaran and Chan both showed little emotion during the proceedings. Commenting on the sentences at the time, AFP Commissioner Keelty stated:

"I stand by the police and what they've done … The Federal Court actually made a decision saying not only had they acted lawfully but they acted in accordance with government policy."

— AFP Commissioner Mick Keelty, quoted in The Sydney Morning Herald on 15 February 2006.

The Prime Minister of Australia, John Howard, was reported as commenting:

"The police are there to protect us from the ravages of drugs and I just hope that every young Australian who might in their wildest imagination think that they can get away with this will take a lesson from this" ..... "I feel desperately sorry for the parents of these people. I do. All of us as parents will feel that way, but the warnings have been there for decades".... "We are against the death penalty..... We will make, in an appropriate way, at the appropriate time, representations."

— Australian Prime Minister John Howard quoted in February 2006.

It was also reported that the Australian government had, since December 2005, used diplomatic channels to plead with the Indonesian government that the death penalty not be sought. Following the handing down of the death sentence for both Sukumaran and Chan, The New Zealand Herald speculated the circumstances under which the execution would occur.

Julian McMahon, a Melbourne human rights lawyer who took over the case in 2006 on a pro-bono basis, appealed against the severity of Sukumaran's sentence to the Indonesian Supreme Court. During the appeal hearings, it was revealed that the governor of Kerobokan Prison described Sukumaran and Chan as model prisoners and that Sukumaran and Chan have a positive influence on other prisoners. In the meantime, the Australian Government elected to not intervene until the outcome of the appeals was known.

On 7 July 2011, it was announced that the Indonesian Supreme Court had rejected Sukumaran's appeal against his death sentence. Indonesian President at that time, Susilo Bambang Yudhoyono, had the power to grant clemency, although media reports considered this unlikely and expected that Sukamaran would be executed. In October 2014, Joko Widodo ("Jokowi") succeeded Yudhoyono as president. Jokowi, who held a hardline position against drugs, declined Sukumaran's plea for clemency in December 2014. In January 2015 the Australian prime minister, Tony Abbott, together with the Australian Minister for Foreign Affairs, Julie Bishop, made further representations to Jokowi and Indonesia's Foreign Minister, Retno Marsudi, for clemency on behalf of Sukumaran. In late January lawyers for Chan and Sukumaran filed an application for a judicial review into their cases; which was rejected by the Denpasar District Court a few days later. Meanwhile, Indonesian officials continued planning for the execution of Chan and Sukumaran:

"The applied norm is that the judicial review doesn't stop the execution process, the convicts have received the president's decree which declines their clemency request."

— Tony Spontana, a spokesperson for Muhammad Prasetyo, the Attorney General of Indonesia, January 2015.

In a final attempt to avert the death penalty, on 9 February lawyers for Chan and Sukumaran launched a rare challenge against the Indonesian president's refusal to grant them pardons; which was dismissed by the Indonesian government a day later.

On 11 February 2015, Indonesian authorities approved the transfer of Andrew Chan and Myuran Sukumaran from Kerobokan prison to Nusa Kambangan in preparation for execution. The transfer was carried out on 4 March.

=== Reaction in Australia ===
A candlelight vigil hosted by the Mercy Campaign, entitled Music for Mercy, was held in Sydney's Martin Place on the evening of 29 January 2015 in support of Sukumaran and Chan. The concert featured performances by singer-songwriter Megan Washington, Josh Pyke, Kate Miller-Heidke, Paul Mac, Glenn Richards from Augie March, and The Presets' Julian Hamilton; with Ben Quilty, Andrew Denton, his partner, Jennifer Byrne, and Missy Higgins who recorded video messages of support for Sukumaran and Chan. Similar vigils were organised in Perth, Federation Square and Toongabbie near Sukumaran's family home. Amnesty International organised similar vigils in Federation Square, Melbourne, Adelaide, Canberra, and Byron Bay.

In January 2015, Roy Morgan Research completed a poll that found over half of Australians opposed the execution of Andrew Chan and Myuran Sukumaran. The poll asked "Andrew Chan and Myuran Sukumaran have been convicted of drug trafficking by the Indonesian courts. Should the death penalty be carried out?" 53% of responses were negative. However, 62% said the Australian Government should not do more to stop the execution of Sukumaran and Chan.

On 13 February, Australia's foreign minister, Julie Bishop, raised the potential for a boycott of Bali as a tourism destination should the executions proceed. Former high court judge Michael Kirby stated that he expected a decline in tourism was a potential consequence of executing Chan and Sukumaran. Both Bishop and Tanya Plibersek, Labor's foreign affairs spokeswoman, made pleas for clemency in the Australian parliament. Quilty and Victorian Supreme Court judge Lex Lasry visited Chan and Sukumaran in Bali.

Human rights lawyer Geoffrey Robertson addressed a vigil in Sydney on 28 April 2015, ahead of the planned execution in the early morning on 29 April, calling for last-minute intervention by the Australian Government.

== Prison life ==
Sukumaran taught English, computer, graphic design and philosophy classes to prisoners. He was instrumental in opening up a computer and art room and also pushed unsuccessfully for an accountancy and law course to be set up. In February 2015, Curtin University conferred Sukumaran with an associate degree in Fine Arts. He also started a business which sells artworks and a clothing brand called Kingpin Clothing.

Sukumaran was appointed head of a group of over 20 prisoners, including those facing execution and housed in the prison's maximum security wing. His role included assigning tasks to prisoners under him, liaising with the guards, resolving disputes and overseeing modest penalties for those who transgress in their jobs cleaning, gardening and making small repairs in the prison.

Sukumaran painted multiple self-portraits while on Nusakambangan. His final painting resembles a bleeding Indonesian flag.

Along with Andrew Chan, he converted to Christianity while imprisoned. Prior to his death, he was working on a bachelor's degree on Fine Arts from Curtin University. Australian artist Matthew Sleeth, who ran art workshops inside Kerobokan prison, called him the "best student" he had seen.

== Art ==
Sukumaran had his first major Australian exhibition at the Campbelltown Arts Centre in January 2017, curated by Australian artist Ben Quilty.

== Execution and funeral ==
By order of the Indonesian government, Sukumaran was executed by firing squad on 29 April 2015 at 12:25am WITA along with Chan and six other prisoners (four Nigerians, a Brazilian and an Indonesian). Sukumaran and the other seven prisoners refused to be blindfolded. They sang "Amazing Grace" before being shot by a 12-member firing squad. Amnesty International condemned the executions, describing them as "reprehensible".

Sukumaran's funeral was conducted at Dayspring Church, Castle Hill, on 9 May 2015.

== See also ==
- List of Australians imprisoned or executed abroad
- List of convicted Australian criminals
- List of Australian criminals
