= Scott Rush =

Australian drug trafficker (born 1985)

- Born: Scott Anthony Rush; 3 October 1985 (age 41)
- Other name: Member of the Bali Nine
- Occupation: Labourer
- Status: Released
- Conviction: Drug trafficking (2006)
- Penalty: Life imprisonment
- Accomplices: Other members of the Bali Nine: Andrew Chan; Si Yi Chen; Michael Czugaj; Renae Lawrence; Tan Duc Thanh Nguyen; Matthew Norman; Martin Stephens; Myuran Sukumaran

Details
- Imprisoned at: Karangasem, Bali, Indonesia

Scott Anthony Rush (born 3 December 1985) is an Australian former labourer who was convicted in Indonesia for drug trafficking as a member of the Bali Nine. In 2005, on his first trip to Bali, Rush was arrested at Ngurah Rai International Airport in Denpasar with 1.3 kg (2.9 lb) of heroin concealed on his body. After a criminal trial, on 13 February 2006, Rush was sentenced to life imprisonment. After appealing against the severity of the sentence, in a surprise outcome handed down by the Bali High Court on 6 September 2006, Rush's sentence was changed to the death penalty. On 10 May 2011, Rush's death sentence was reduced to life imprisonment on appeal to the Indonesian Supreme Court. On 15 December 2024, after an agreement was made between the Indonesian government and the Australian government to arrange the repatriation of the remainder of the Bali Nine, Rush returned to Australia to live freely in the community.

== Early life ==
Scott Anthony Rush was born on 3 October 1985. Rush grew up in Chelmer, a western riverside suburb of Brisbane. Following his arrest, conviction, and sentencing, it was revealed that Rush had been expelled from Brisbane's St Laurence's College during his Year 10 studies for an incident involving drugs. It was reported that Rush then moved to another Brisbane school, Marist College Rosalie, whence he graduated in 2002. Media reports claim that Rush was using cannabis at the age of 15 and has used ecstasy and prescription drugs. Further information released following his sentencing, state that in December 2004 Rush pleaded guilty at Inala Magistrates' Court to 16 offences, including drug possession, fraud, theft and drink-driving. A warrant for his arrest in Australia was outstanding at the time of his trip to Bali, relating to A$4,796.95 stolen from an Australian bank.

== Alleged trafficking conspiracy ==
According to media reports, Rush and his Brisbane friend, Michael Czugaj, met Tan Duc Thanh Nguyen in a Fortitude Valley hotel. Nguyen offered them both a free holiday to Bali, with one media report also stating that Rush was provided a mobile phone prior to his departure from Sydney. Rush, aged 19, and Czugaj, aged 18, arrived in Bali on 8 April 2005 and checked into Hotel Aneka, the same hotel used by Indonesian police for their surveillance. According to claims made in his defense by Rush's lawyer, Nguyen introduced both Rush and Czugaj to alleged co-ringleaders of the smuggling operation, Andrew Chan and Myuran Sukumaran at the Hard Rock Hotel in Bali. Allegedly, Chan and Sukumaran threatened both Rush and Czugaj, ordering them to carry concealed goods, or that their families would be killed.

=== Arrest in Indonesia ===
Rush was arrested by Indonesian police on 17 April 2005 at Ngurah Rai International Airport in Denpasar, Bali. Heroin weighing 1.3 kg (2.9 lb) was discovered strapped to his legs concealed underneath his clothing. Czugaj, Renae Lawrence and Martin Stephens were arrested at the same time as Rush. On 20 April 2005, graphic footage of the arrests and subsequent police questioning of Rush and other members of the Bali Nine was aired on Australian television.

On the same day that Rush was arrested, Indonesian police also arrested Si Yi Chen, Nguyen, Sukumaran and Matthew Norman at the Melasti Hotel in Kuta. Alleged co-ringleader, Andrew Chan was also arrested the same day while seated on an Australian Airlines flight waiting to depart Denpasar for Sydney. At the time Chan was arrested, he was carrying three mobile phones and a boarding pass. No drugs were found in his possession.

=== Criticism of Australian Federal Police tipoff ===
Lee Rush, Scott Rush's father, said that the Australian Federal Police (AFP) were contacted, on behalf of Rush senior, prior to Rush's departure from Australia and before the commission of the offence. Rush senior feared that his son was travelling to Bali and would commit a drug-related crime. Rush senior claims then to have received assurances from the AFP that they would tell his son he was under surveillance to dissuade him from going through with the crime before the group's departure from Indonesia. Scott Rush's lawyers said he was never contacted. It was revealed that the AFP alerted Indonesian police that a crime was to be committed approximately two weeks before the arrests, and had commenced an investigation about ten weeks prior to the arrests. When the Bali Nine were arrested, the news of the tipoff became public and there was criticism of the role of the AFP in protecting the interests of Australian citizens. Commenting on the matter at the time, AFP Commissioner Mick Keelty was reported as saying:

"One of the things we've got to remember is that we operate within our criminal-justice system here in Australia, and if we only co-operated with countries that had the same criminal-justice system, then our co-operation wouldn't extend very far beyond Australia. We have to work with the systems that operate in other countries, and to a large degree this has been successful, certainly in terms of heroin trafficking."

— Australian Federal Police Commissioner Mick Keelty, quoted in The Monthly, July 2007.

Rush took action in the Federal Court of Australia against the AFP for breach of the bilateral treaty between Indonesia and Australia when information was handed by the AFP to the Indonesians. Rush's case claimed that such information should only be released by the Attorney-General. However, the Commonwealth Government maintained that the treaty only applies after a suspect is charged. The application was dismissed by the Federal Court in January 2006.

In an interview aired on 13 February 2006 on ABC TV program, Australian Story, Rush's parents spoke out against the Australian Federal Police actions.

"I was informed at 1.30 in the morning that Scott would be spoken to and asked not to board the flight to Bali. It wasn't until about mid-morning that I received a call from Bob and a distressed tone in his voice he said, 'Mate, we could not stop him, they have let him go through and he's on his way to Bali'. Under no circumstances do I condone the trafficking of drugs – I particularly dislike drugs of any nature, always have. When I received a call from the Australian Government authorities that Scott had been detained in Indonesia for attempting to export heroin, I was speechless, sickened to the gut." ...... "I feel very let down by our Australian Federal Police – we tried to lawfully stop our son leaving the country, it wasn't done."

— Scott Rush's parents, interviewed on the ABC TV program, Australian Story, February 2006.

== Criminal trial ==
Criminal trials for the accused commenced in the Denpasar District Court on 11 October 2005. Chen, Nguyen, and Norman were tried together, with Czugaj being one of the remaining six defendants tried separately. When asked why he chose to travel to Bali on a paid holiday, Rush replied "Basically that he (Nguyen) didn't have anyone to come to Bali with him." Nguyen refused to testify. Rush also claimed that when he met Chan, threats were made against his family:

"The threat made me very frightened, and we were forced to follow whatever they told us to do. I had no opportunity to be away and escape from the threat as I love my family and my mother and my father."

— Rush, quoted on ABC TV's Australian Story, February 2006.

Czugaj confirmed Rush's account of events as being true. Czugaj testified that he and Rush had never met Lawrence or Stephens, both since convicted and of New South Wales, until they were all arrested together at Ngurah Rai Airport. Rush told the court Chan told him:

"You do as I say, don't mess around with me. I've got a gun with me and I could kill you. If I wanted to, I could kill you right now."

— Rush quoting Andrew Chan, testifying before the Denpasar District Court, December 2005.

Chan protested his innocence, saying before the court, "A lot of lies have been set against me, but the true reality is I'm not what people put me out to be. I've never threatened anybody in my life." During court proceedings, Rush initially refused to handle strapping material admitted as evidence, saying "No, no", before agreeing to handle the evidence after being urged to by the judge.

=== Sentencing and appeal ===
During his final plea to judges, Rush said:

"I hope this will be a lesson for everyone, especially my people in Australia, not to believe other people that you do not know well."

— Rush, quoted in his final plea prior to his sentencing, February 2006.

On 13 February 2006 Rush was sentenced to life imprisonment by the Denpasar District Court. Family friend Neil Urquhart was quoted in response to the life sentence imposed on Rush:

"We know he's guilty of it, but you know in Australia, the sentencing is totally different. All right, so he's in a different country and I suppose by rights, you should obey the laws of the country and you've got to accept what they say. But it's a bit harsh."

— Neil Urquhart, a friend of the Rush family, quoted following Rush's sentencing, February 2006.

On appeal on 6 September 2006, the Bali High Court imposed the death penalty in what many considered a surprising outcome for Rush.

On 10 May 2011 a judicial review of Rush's sentence via appeal to the Indonesian Supreme Court resulted in a reduction of his sentence to life imprisonment. Since then he has continued to serve his sentence in an Indonesian prison.

== Prison life ==
While serving his imprisonment in Indonesia, Rush received $125 per month under a prisoner loan scheme from the Australian Federal Government. On 7 May 2010, Rush was circumcised in the musholla of Kerobokan prison by an unauthorised visitor, without the prior knowledge or consent of the prison's doctors, in Rush's alleged effort to convert to Islam. Rush has since maintained that he is a Christian and that he underwent the circumcision for "health reasons," despite the prison being equipped for such surgery. Media reports claimed Rush's actions were symptoms of death row phenomenon.

In May 2011 there were media reports that Rush planned to marry his American girlfriend, Karen Hermiz. In mid 2014, he planned to marry a London banker who he met briefly before his arrest, Nikki Butler.

After initially serving time in the Kerobokan Prison, in 2014 Rush was transferred, at his request, to a prison in Karangasem, East Bali, to improve himself.

On 15 December 2024, after an agreement was made between the Indonesian government and the Australian government to arrange the repatriation of the remainder of the Bali Nine, Rush returned to Australia to live freely.

== See also ==
- List of Australians in international prisons
- List of Australian criminals
