= Andrew Chan (drug smuggler) =

Australian drug trafficker (1984–2015)

- Chan in 2015
- Born: 12 January 1984; Sydney, New South Wales, Australia
- Died: 29 April 2015 (aged 31); Nusa Kambangan, Central Java, Indonesia
- Cause of death: Execution by firing squad
- Known for: Drug trafficking, Bali Nine
- Spouse: Febyanti Herewila
- Status: Executed
- Conviction: Drug trafficking (2006)
- Penalty: Death
- Accomplices: Si Yi Chen; Michael Czugaj; Renae Lawrence; Tan Duc Thanh Nguyen; Matthew Norman; Scott Rush; Martin Stephens; Myuran Sukumaran

Chinese name
- Traditional Chinese: 陳子維
- Simplified Chinese: 陈子维
Transcriptions
Standard Mandarin
- Hanyu Pinyin: Chén Zǐwéi
Yue: Cantonese
- Jyutping: Can4 Zi2 Wai4

Andrew Chan (12 January 1984 – 29 April 2015) was an Australian man who was convicted and executed in Indonesia for drug trafficking as a member of the Bali Nine. In 2005, Chan was arrested at Ngurah Rai International Airport in Denpasar. According to court testimonies of convicted drug mules, Chan and Myuran Sukumaran were the co-ringleaders of the heroin smuggling operation from Indonesia to Australia. After a criminal trial on 14 February 2006, Chan was sentenced to execution by firing squad by the Denpasar District Court.

After lodging an appeal against his sentence, the appeal was dismissed by the Indonesian Supreme Court on 10 May 2011. His plea for clemency was rejected by the President of Indonesia, Joko Widodo, on 22 January 2015. The execution was carried out on 29 April 2015.

== Early life and education ==
Andrew Chan was born on 12 January 1984 in Sydney, New South Wales, the youngest child of Helena and Ken Yock Chan, both first-generation Cantonese-speaking immigrants from Mainland China. Chan was one of four children, having an older brother and two older sisters. Chan's mother Helena Chan had poor English language skills, and Chan did not speak Cantonese. Chan's older brother Michael translated for him when required.

Chan grew up in Enfield in Sydney, and attended Homebush Boys High School. Both he and Myuran Sukumaran attended the same school, but Sukumaran was four school years above Chan, and they did not meet until 2002, at a mutual friend's house.

== Career ==
Chan was employed at Eurest, a catering company, where he worked as a supervisor. It was reported that Chan had a good reputation at his job and was known to be a punctual and reliable worker. In an interview broadcast on SBS TV's Dateline following his sentencing and appeal, Chan stated:

"I don't think I was really going anywhere in life. I don't think, you know, I was achieving too much, even though I had a stable job and all. Yes, I don't think I was really heading anywhere, to be honest, you know, I've used drugs myself I was a drug user. You know, I know what it feels like to – to be, you know, one of them junkies walking on the street I guess..... You don't think too much about – I didn't anyway. You know, most people think yeah, you would, but I didn't. It wasn't – more or less for me it was just quick pay day, that's it. Just think to yourself quick pay day, that's it – Nothing more, nothing less."

— Andrew Chan, interviewed in 2010 and broadcast on SBS TV's Dateline following his sentencing and appeal.

When Chan worked for Eurest, he met Renae Lawrence, Martin Stephens and Matthew Norman. All four would later be convicted of drug trafficking as fellow members of the Bali Nine. Media reports claim that in early October 2004, Chan invited Lawrence to the Enfield home of his parents to celebrate Lawrence's 27th birthday; Chan was living with his parents at this time. Here, Chan allegedly told Lawrence that she was to travel with him to Bali, without being told the detail behind the mission. Lawrence claimed that Chan would cover all air flights and accommodation and that if she disobeyed him or disclosed the nature of their arrangement, he would "send (her) family to the farm". Lawrence claimed that Chan said there would be a reward, should she follow his instructions. It was also reported that she met Myuran Sukumaran around this time.

== Drug smuggling ==
It was alleged that Chan flew to Bali on 16 October 2004, with Lawrence also arriving in Bali on the same date. Lawrence claimed that Chan was in regular contact with her when she stayed in the Istana Rama Hotel in Kuta, and Chan in Kuta's Hard Rock complex. Media reports stated that Lawrence alleged that on 22 October 2004, Sukumaran strapped packages to the body of both Lawrence and Chan, and with Chan's girlfriend, Grace, boarded a commercial flight to Australia, successfully clearing security, customs and immigration in both Indonesia and Australia. Lawrence claimed that she and Chan were met at the airport, the packages removed, all of them taken to another house, and then Lawrence went home. A few days later Lawrence claimed that Chan handed her an envelope with $10,000 cash.

Lawrence claimed that a similar trip was organised following Chan's orders, where she departed Australia on 5 December 2004. Lawrence claimed that seven others were involved, including Chan, Matthew Norman, and Tan Duc Thanh Nguyen (going by the alias of David). Lawrence claimed that she was again given cash to purchase air flights and accommodation for eight days, staying again at the Istana Rama in Kuta. However, the second delivery was aborted when heroin suppliers failed to deliver "due to a financial matter or someone knowing about the plan the shipment was cancelled".

According to Lawrence, again under Chan's instructions, Lawrence departed Australia on 6 April 2005. The day before, Lawrence, Stephens and Si Yi Chen met with Sukumaran where police allege drug smuggling tools such as sealable plastic bags, medical tape, elastic waist bands and skin tight bike shorts were stuffed into the bags of Lawrence and Stephens. Lawrence claims that she was given cash, whereas Stephens claims that his life was threatened. According to media reports, police records show that during his stay in Bali, Chan was in daily contact with Lawrence, until 13 April, when Chan changed his mobile phone number. On the same day, Chan instructed Lawrence and other members of the Bali Nine to change hotels. The original planned departure date of 14 April from Bali was delayed as Chan suspected Australian and Indonesian police were aware of his plans.

=== Arrest ===
Chan was arrested on 17 April 2005 as he was seated on an Australian Airlines flight waiting to depart Ngurah Rai Airport in Denpasar, Bali, Indonesia, for Sydney. He was arrested carrying three mobile phones and a boarding pass; however, no drugs were found in his possession.

Around the same time as Chan was arrested, Indonesian police arrested four drug mules collectively carrying 8.3 kg (18 lb) of heroin concealed on their bodies. Martin Stephens was found to be carrying 3.3 kg (7.3 lb); Renae Lawrence was found to be carrying 2.689 kg (5.93 lb); Michael Czugaj was found to be carrying 1.75 kg (3.9 lb) and Scott Rush was found to be carrying 1.3 kg (2.9 lb) of heroin. A little later that same day, Indonesian police also arrested Si Yi Chen, Tan Duc Thanh Nguyen, Myuran Sukumaran and Matthew Norman at the Melasti Hotel in Kuta. Indonesian police claim that this latter group were in possession of 334 g (11.8 oz) of heroin and bundles of plastic wrapping, Elastoplast tape, and a set of scales, indicating involvement in a plan to transport drugs to Australia.

=== Criticism of Australian Federal Police tipoff ===
Lee Rush, the father of Scott Rush, a fellow member of the Bali Nine, said that he contacted the Australian Federal Police (AFP) prior to the commission of the offence, fearing his son was travelling to Bali and would commit a drug-related crime. Rush Sr. claims then to have received assurances from the AFP that they would tell his son he was under surveillance to dissuade him from going through with the crime before the group's departure from Indonesia. Scott Rush's lawyers said he was never contacted. It was revealed that the AFP alerted Indonesian police that a crime was to be committed approximately two weeks before the arrests, and had commenced an investigation about ten weeks prior to the arrests. When the Bali Nine were arrested, the news of the tipoff became public and there was criticism of the role of the AFP in protecting the interests of Australian citizens. Commenting on the matter at the time, AFP Commissioner Mick Keelty was reported as saying:

"One of the things we've got to remember is that we operate within our criminal-justice system here in Australia, and if we only co-operated with countries that had the same criminal-justice system, then our co-operation wouldn't extend very far beyond Australia. We have to work with the systems that operate in other countries, and to a large degree this has been successful, certainly in terms of heroin trafficking."

— Australian Federal Police Commissioner Mick Keelty, quoted in The Monthly, July 2007.

Rush took action in the Federal Court of Australia against the AFP for breach of the bilateral treaty between Indonesia and Australia when information was handed by the AFP to the Indonesians. Rush's case claimed that such information should only be released by the Attorney-General. However, the Commonwealth Government maintained that the treaty only applies after a suspect is charged. The application was dismissed by the Federal Court in January 2006.

=== Trial ===
Criminal trials for the accused commenced in the Denpasar District Court on 11 October 2005. Chen, Nguyen, and Norman, all arrested at the Melasti Hotel and earning the numeric epithet, The Melasti Three, were tried together, with the remaining six defendants, including Chan, tried separately.

In December 2005, it was reported that tensions were building between the Bali Nine drug mules and Sukumaran and Chan. Several days later, lawyers acting for some members of the Bali Nine initially sought the support of the Director of Public Prosecutions to intervene and lay charges for conspiracy to import drugs, so that the nine could be extradited and charged under Australian law. However, the judges hearing the trial matters in Bali called for Australia not to intervene in Indonesia's right to impose capital punishment. Lawyers acting for Stephens, one of the Bali Nine, claimed that the fairness of his trial was in jeopardy following comments made in the media by Indonesian Foreign Minister Hassan Wirajuda that Australians should be prepared for members of the Bali Nine to receive a death sentence, if found guilty.

Giving evidence against Chan, Lawrence testified that she had received threats of harm against herself and her family if she did not proceed with the plan to import heroin into Australia. She claimed before the Denpasar District Court that Chan ordered her to book a flight to Bali and that she did not know why she was ordered to travel. Another drug mule, Rush, also later convicted of drug trafficking, accused Chan of strapping the heroin to his body while wearing rubber gloves.

Throughout his trial, Chan remained silent. During his final plea, reading from a two-page statement, Chan commented:

"I didn't say anything in court because if I did, I'd be lying. The truth is, I know nothing. A lot of lies have been said against me, but the true reality is I'm not what people put me out to be. I've never threatened anybody in my life. The outcome I wish, of course, and my family is that you find that you would release me, for I had nothing to participate in this......The reason why I always smile is because I feel the Lord's presence anywhere I go and he gives me the courage. I feel it in this very courtroom today. I'm 22-years-old and I'm a young man, all I ask your honour is that you will give me an opportunity to restart my new fulfilled life."

— Chan's statement before the Denpasar District Court in his final plea of innocence, 13 February 2006.

The Prime Minister of Australia, John Howard, said that the Australian government would oppose any death sentences imposed, saying:

"We have a long-standing opposition to the death penalty and it's well known that if a death penalty is imposed on an Australian we ask that that death penalty not be imposed."

— Australian Prime Minister John Howard quoted in the Australian Associated Press wire service, 13 February 2006.

=== Sentencing and appeal ===
In January 2006, prosecutors called for the death penalty to be handed down on Chan, after earlier calls for the same demand against Sukumaran – the only two calls of death put forward by prosecutors for any of the Bali Nine. Prosecutors told a Bali court there was no reason to show any leniency because Chan helped organise the heroin smuggling operation. Prosecutors also claim Sukumaran and Chan strapped heroin to the bodies of the fellow accused. Indonesian police identified Chan as one of the main players in what they say was a major smuggling ring.

Found guilty of drug trafficking, on 14 February 2006 three judges in the Denpasar District Court sentenced Chan to death by firing squad. In handing down their ruling, they claimed that Chan had not been straightforward in his evidence and had shown no remorse.

Julian McMahon, a Melbourne human rights lawyer who took over the case in 2006 on a pro-bono basis, appealed against the severity of Chan's sentence to the Indonesian Supreme Court. During the appeal hearings it was revealed that Chan had a girlfriend and that the governor of Kerobokan Prison described Chan and Sukumaran as model prisoners and that Chan and Sukumaran had a positive influence on other prisoners. In his final appeal, Chan said "I apologize to the Indonesian people, I also apologize to my family and I realize that my actions have brought shame and suffering to my whole family. If I am pardoned... I hope that one day I will be able to have my own family and work as a pastor so I can give guidance to young people. I can still contribute a great deal during my life. I have lost all my integrity and good will, and brought deep shame and outrageous suffering to my loved ones."

On 17 June 2011, it was announced that the Indonesian Supreme Court had rejected Chan's appeal against his death sentence on 10 May 2011. Indonesian President at that time, Susilo Bambang Yudhoyono, had the power to grant clemency, although media reports considered this unlikely and expected that Chan would be executed. In October 2014, Joko Widodo (Jokowi) succeeded Yudhoyono as president. Jokowi holds a hardline position against drugs. In January 2015 the Australian Prime Minister Tony Abbott together with the Australian Minister for Foreign Affairs Julie Bishop made further representations to Jokowi and Indonesia's Foreign Minister Retno Marsudi for clemency in the commutation of Chan's sentence. Chan's plea for clemency was dismissed. In late January lawyers for Chan and Sukumaran filed an application for a judicial review into their cases; which was rejected by the Denpasar District Court a few days later. Meanwhile, Indonesian officials continued planning for the execution of Chan and Sukumaran: Tony Spontana, a spokesperson for Muhammad Prasetyo, the Attorney General of Indonesia, said that "The applied norm is that the judicial review doesn't stop the execution process, the convicts have received the president's decree which declines their clemency request."

In a final attempt to avert the death penalty, on 9 February, lawyers for Chan and Sukumaran launched a rare challenge against the Indonesian president's refusal to grant them pardons; which was dismissed by the Indonesian government a day later.

On 11 February 2015, Indonesian authorities approved the transfer of Andrew Chan and Myuran Sukumaran from Kerobokan prison, in preparation for execution.

=== Reaction in Australia ===
A candlelight vigil hosted by the Mercy Campaign, entitled Music for Mercy, was held in Sydney's Martin Place on the evening of 29 January 2015, in support of Chan and Sukumaran. The concert featured performances by Archibald Prize artist Ben Quilty, singer-songwriter Megan Washington, Josh Pyke, Kate Miller-Heidke, Paul Mac, Glenn Richards from Augie March, and The Presets' Julian Hamilton; with Andrew Denton, his partner, Jennifer Byrne, and Missy Higgins who recorded video messages of support for Chan and Sukumaran. Amnesty International organised similar vigils in Federation Square, Melbourne, Adelaide, Canberra, and Byron Bay.

On 13 February, Australia's foreign minister, Julie Bishop, raised the potential for a boycott of Bali as a tourism destination should the executions proceed. Former high court judge Michael Kirby stated that he expected a decline in tourism was a potential consequence of executing Chan and Sukumaran. Both Bishop and Tanya Plibersek, Labor's foreign affairs spokeswoman, made pleas for clemency in the Australian parliament. Quilty and Victorian supreme court judge Lex Lasry visited Chan and Sukumaran in Bali.

== Prison life ==
Chan married Febyanti Herewila, whom he met when she was visiting another prisoner, on 27 April 2015. The prison governor described Chan and Sukumaran as model prisoners and testified in court that they should not be executed because of the positive influence they had. In an interview the governor stated that "Chan organises courses in prison, leads the English-language church service and is a mentor to many." Formerly an atheist, Chan was converted to Christianity by Rob and Christie Buckingham, founders of the Australia-based Bayside Church. He studied theology to become a pastor, leading the English-language Christian church service. He also started a certificate course at Harvest Bible College. In reconciling his death sentence with his faith in God, Chan said:

"When I got back to my cell, I said, 'God, I asked you to set me free, not kill me.' God spoke to me and said, 'Andrew, I have set you free from the inside out, I have given you life!' From that moment on I haven't stopped worshipping Him. I had never sung before, never led worship, until Jesus set me free."

— Chan while in custody following his sentencing, quoted in 2013.

== Execution and funeral ==
By order of the Indonesian government, Chan was executed by firing squad on 29 April 2015 at 12:25 am WIB along with Sukumaran and six other prisoners. Chan and the other seven prisoners refused to be blindfolded. They sang "Amazing Grace" before being shot by a 12-member firing squad. Amnesty International condemned the executions, describing them as "reprehensible".

Chan's funeral was conducted at Hillsong Church, Baulkham Hills, on 8 May 2015.

== See also ==
- List of Australians imprisoned or executed abroad
- List of Australians convicted of crimes
