= Michael Czugaj =

Australian drug trafficker

- Born: Michael William Czugaj c. 1986 (age 39–40)
- Other name: Member of the Bali Nine
- Occupation: Glazier
- Status: Released
- Conviction: Drug trafficking (2006)
- Penalty: Life
- Wanted by: Indonesia
- Accomplices: Andrew Chan; Si Yi Chen; Renae Lawrence; Tan Duc Thanh Nguyen; Matthew Norman; Scott Rush; Martin Stephens; Myuran Sukumaran
- Wanted since: 2005

Details
- Imprisoned at: Kerobokan Prison, Bali, Indonesia

Michael William Czugaj (born c. 1986) is an Australian former glazier from Oxley, a suburb of Brisbane, Queensland, who was convicted in Indonesia for drug trafficking of heroin as a member of the Bali Nine. In 2005, Czugaj was arrested at Ngurah Rai International Airport in Denpasar with 1.75 kg (3.9 lb) of heroin concealed on his body. After a criminal trial on 14 February 2006 Czugaj was sentenced to life imprisonment. His life sentence was reduced to a term of 20 years on appeal on 26 April 2006, but reinstated five months later.

== Background ==
Czugaj was an apprentice glazier and keen surfer, one of eight children born to Polish Australian parents. He left his job in March 2005 and told his family that he was going to Cairns for a holiday. Czugaj's parents were quoted as saying he was a "problem child" but had never been in serious trouble and had no drug history. His father, Steven, said he didn't think he had a passport:

"The kid's got no money ... this must have all been arranged, I don't know how or by whom."

Following his sentencing, it was revealed that he had earlier led a life of petty crime including train fare evasion, wilful damage, drink-driving and receiving stolen property. It was reported that Czugaj had 14 convictions for offences and was regularly before several Brisbane Magistrates' Courts between 2003 and 2005. Subsequent to the criminal proceedings in Bali, in 2008 Czugaj's older brother, Richard, pleaded guilty to assault and was sentenced to 18 months' in prison.

== Alleged trafficking conspiracy ==
According to media reports, Czugaj claimed that his Brisbane friend, Scott Rush, introduced him to Tan Duc Thanh Nguyen whilst socialising in Brisbane. Nguyen offered them both a free holiday to Bali. Czugaj, aged 18, and Rush, aged 19, arrived in Bali on 8 April 2005 and checked into Hotel Aneka, the same hotel used by Indonesian police for their surveillance.

=== Arrest in Indonesia ===
Czugaj was arrested by Indonesian police on 17 April 2005 at Ngurah Rai International Airport in Denpasar, Bali. Heroin weighing 1.75 kg (3.9 lb) was discovered strapped to his legs and chest, concealed underneath his clothing. Rush, Renae Lawrence and Martin Stephens were arrested at the same time as Czugaj. On 20 April 2005, graphic footage of the arrests and subsequent police questioning of Czugaj and other members of the Bali Nine was aired on Australian television.

On the same day that Czugaj was arrested, Indonesian police also arrested Si Yi Chen, Nguyen, Myuran Sukumaran and Matthew Norman at the Melasti Hotel in Kuta. Alleged co-ringleader, Andrew Chan was also arrested the same day whilst seated on an Australian Airlines flight waiting to depart Denpasar for Sydney. At the time Chan was arrested, he was carrying three mobile phones and a boarding pass. No drugs were found in his possession.

=== Criticism of Australian Federal Police tipoff ===
Lee Rush, the father of Scott Rush, a fellow member of the Bali Nine, said that he contacted the Australian Federal Police (AFP) prior to the commission of the offence, fearing his son was travelling to Bali and would commit a drug-related crime. Rush senior claims then to have received assurances from the AFP that they would tell his son he was under surveillance to dissuade him from going through with the crime before the group's departure from Indonesia. Scott Rush's lawyers said he was never contacted. It was revealed that the AFP alerted Indonesian police that a crime was to be committed approximately two weeks before the arrests, and had commenced an investigation about ten weeks prior to the arrests. When the Bali Nine were arrested, the news of the tipoff became public and there was criticism of the role of the AFP in protecting the interests of Australian citizens. Commenting on the matter at the time, AFP Commissioner Mick Keelty was reported as saying:

"One of the things we've got to remember is that we operate within our criminal-justice system here in Australia, and if we only co-operated with countries that had the same criminal-justice system, then our co-operation wouldn't extend very far beyond Australia. We have to work with the systems that operate in other countries, and to a large degree this has been successful, certainly in terms of heroin trafficking."

— Australian Federal Police Commissioner Mick Keelty, quoted in The Monthly, July 2007.

Rush took action in the Federal Court of Australia against the AFP for breach of the bilateral treaty between Indonesia and Australia when information was handed by the AFP to the Indonesians. Rush's case claimed that such information should only be released by the Attorney-General. However, the Commonwealth Government maintained that the treaty only applies after a suspect is charged. The application was dismissed by the Federal Court in January 2006.

== Criminal trial ==
Criminal trials for the accused commenced in the Denpasar District Court on 11 October 2005. Chen, Nguyen and Norman were tried together, with Czugaj being one of the remaining six defendants tried separately. Czugaj testified Rush introduced him to Tan Duc Thanh Nguyen in Brisbane, with Nguyen allegedly offering both Czugaj and Rush a free holiday to Bali. Czugaj testified he had never met fellow drug smugglers Lawrence or Stephens, both of New South Wales, until they were all arrested together at Ngurah Rai International Airport carrying the concealed heroin; however, he had met Chan.

During court proceedings, Czugaj at one stage accused one of his interrogators of lying under oath. Czugaj often complained about feeling ill and suffering headaches, and when in pain due to the extraction of a wisdom tooth, Judge I Putu Widnya asked Czugaj to proceed to the judges bench and open his mouth to prove tooth extraction had occurred.

Czugaj testified that Chan threatened to kill him and his family if he did not cooperate and participate in the heroin smuggling attempt:

"I would never put my family in any danger and I would do anything to keep my family from harm's way. I am sure any person would do the same as I have done."

— Czugaj, quoted during his trial, February 2006.

=== Sentencing and appeal ===
During his final plea, Czugaj said:

"Thank you to the authorities for how well we have been treated in custody in Bali. I am truly sorry and regret all that has happened. To start with, I was deceived by Tan with his offer of a free holiday to Bali with his friends. In all honesty I should not have been so blind to this, this so-called holiday. But as Bali has always been a favourite destination, it made me overwhelmed with excitement, I jumped at the chance to go to Bali."

— Czugaj, quoted during his plea prior to sentencing, February 2006.

On 14 February 2006, Czugaj was sentenced to life imprisonment. Commenting on the sentences at the time, Australian Federal Police Commissioner Mick Keelty stated:

"I stand by the police and what they've done … The Federal Court actually made a decision saying not only had they acted lawfully but they acted in accordance with government policy."

— Australian Federal Police Commissioner Mick Keelty, quoted in The Sydney Morning Herald following Czugaj's sentencing, February 2006.

The Australian Prime Minister John Howard was reported as commenting:

"The police are there to protect us from the ravages of drugs and I just hope that every young Australian who might in their wildest imagination think that they can get away with this will take a lesson from this" .... "I feel desperately sorry for the parents of these people. I do. All of us as parents will feel that way, but the warnings have been there for decades."

— Australian Prime Minister John Howard, following Czugaj's sentencing, February 2006.

After an appeal for a more lenient sentence, Czugaj's sentence was reduced to 20 years on 26 April 2006; however, this was overturned and the original life sentence reinstated on 6 September 2006.

== Prison life ==
Czugaj was held in Kerobokan Prison in Bali where he studied business management. His beautician girlfriend, Lena, had been visiting him for more than three years. His mother, Vicki, visited annually from Brisbane, staying for two weeks at a time.

On 15 December 2024, Czugaj and the other four remaining members of the Bali Nine arrived back in Australia on a commercial flight. He will not be required to serve any further prison time in the country.

== See also ==
- List of Australians imprisoned or executed abroad
- List of Australian criminals
