= Matthew Norman =

Australian drug trafficker

- Born: Matthew James Norman; 17 September 1986 (age 40)
- Other name: Member of the Bali Nine
- Occupation: Caterer
- Status: Released
- Conviction: Drug trafficking (2006)
- Penalty: Life imprisonment
- Accomplices: Andrew Chan; Si Yi Chen; Michael Czugaj; Renae Lawrence; Tan Duc Thanh Nguyen; Scott Rush; Martin Stephens; Myuran Sukumaran

Details
- Imprisoned at: Kerobokan Prison, Bali, Indonesia

Matthew James Norman (born 17 September 1986) is an Australian man who was arrested with three others in 2005 after Indonesian police uncovered 334 g (11.8 oz) of heroin in a suitcase in their hotel room in Kuta. He was convicted of drug trafficking as a member of the Bali Nine.

On 15 February 2006, Norman was sentenced to life imprisonment, a sentence that was increased to the death penalty on 6 September 2006 as a result of an unsuccessful appeal. However, after a full confession, the Indonesian Supreme Court reinstated the original sentence of life imprisonment upon a subsequent appeal, and after nearly twenty years of incarceration in an Indonesian prison, as a result of diplomatic negotiations, he was eventually released along with the remaining incarcerated members of the Bali Nine.

== Pending court appearance ==
Prior to the events in Bali, in an earlier unrelated incident, Norman and Lawrence were arrested on 26 March 2005. Police used road spikes to intercept the pair, who were travelling along the Pacific Highway in a stolen vehicle. As a result, both were due to appear on 26 April 2005 in the Gosford Magistrates Court to face car theft and traffic-related charges. However, due to their arrest in Indonesia nine days earlier, both Norman and Lawrence failed to appear.

== Alleged trafficking conspiracy ==
From Quakers Hill in Sydney's western suburbs, Norman was employed at Eurest, a catering company, where he met colleagues Martin Stephens, Renae Lawrence, and his supervisor, Andrew Chan. All four were convicted of drug trafficking as fellow members of the Bali Nine.

Media reports based on the testimony of co-conspirator, Renae Lawrence, claim that Norman was involved in an attempt in December 2004, at trafficking from Indonesia to Australia. This attempt was allegedly organised by Tan Duc Thanh Nguyen and involved Norman, Lawrence, Andrew Chan, and others. The delivery was aborted when heroin suppliers failed to deliver "due to a financial matter or someone knowing about the plan the shipment was cancelled".

On or about 8 April 2005, Norman arrived in Bali with Si Yi Chen and checked into the White Rose Hotel. It was reported that Norman and Chen "hardly ever left their room".

On 14 April, Norman, Chen, Lawrence, and Stephens checked into Adhi Dharma hotel, with Nguyen arriving in the same hotel two days later. It was reported the police took the room next to Norman and Chen. In the evening of Sunday 17 April, appearing like tourists, Norman, Nguyen, and Chen checked into the Melasti Hotel. Myuran Sukumaran, who was also with them, with his bags, left them with the others as he decided to go to the Hard Rock Hotel complex.

=== Arrest in Indonesia ===
About 20 minutes after checking in, Norman, aged 18, was arrested at the Melasti Hotel in Kuta on 17 April 2005 with Tan Duc Thanh Nguyen, Myuran Sukumaran and Si Yi Chen. Indonesian police claim the group were in possession of 334 g (11.8 oz) of heroin and bundles of plastic wrapping, Elastoplast tape, and a set of scales, indicating involvement in a plan to transport drugs to Australia.

Earlier that day at Ngurah Rai International Airport in Denpasar, Indonesian police also arrested the following drug mules after they were found carrying various amounts of heroin concealed on their bodies. Martin Stephens was found to be carrying 3.3 kg (7.3 lb); Renae Lawrence was found to be carrying 2.689 kg (5.93 lb); Michael Czugaj was found to be carrying 1.75 kg (3.9 lb) and Scott Rush was found to be carrying 1.3 kg (2.9 lb) of heroin. Alleged co-ringleader, Andrew Chan was also arrested the same day while seated on an Australian Airlines flight waiting to depart Denpasar for Sydney. At the time Chan was arrested, he was carrying three mobile phones and a boarding pass. No drugs were found in his possession.

Of the nine arrested, Norman was the youngest.

=== Criticism of Australian Federal Police tipoff ===
Lee Rush, the father of Scott Rush, a fellow member of the Bali Nine, said that he contacted the Australian Federal Police (AFP) before the commission of the offence, fearing his son was travelling to Bali and would commit a drug-related crime. Rush senior claims then to have received assurances from the AFP that they would tell his son he was under surveillance to dissuade him from going through with the crime before the group's departure from Indonesia. Scott Rush's lawyers said he was never contacted. It was revealed that the AFP alerted Indonesian police that a crime was to be committed approximately two weeks before the arrests, and had commenced an investigation about ten weeks before the arrests. When the Bali Nine were arrested, the news of the tipoff became public and there was criticism of the role of the AFP in protecting the interests of Australian citizens. Commenting on the matter at the time, AFP Commissioner Mick Keelty was reported as saying:

One of the things we've got to remember is that we operate within our criminal-justice system here in Australia, and if we only co-operated with countries that had the same criminal-justice system, then our co-operation wouldn't extend very far beyond Australia. We have to work with the systems that operate in other countries, and to a large degree this has been successful, certainly in terms of heroin trafficking.

— Australian Federal Police Commissioner Mick Keelty, quoted in The Monthly, July 2007.

Rush took action in the Federal Court of Australia against the AFP for breach of the bilateral treaty between Indonesia and Australia when information was handed by the AFP to the Indonesians. Rush's case claimed that such information should only be released by the Attorney-General. However, the Commonwealth Government maintained that the treaty only applies after a suspect is charged. The application was dismissed by the Federal Court in January 2006.

== Criminal trial ==
Criminal trials for the accused commenced in the Denpasar District Court on 11 October 2005. Chen, Nguyen, and Norman, all arrested at the Melasti Hotel and earning the numeric epithet, The Melasti Three, were tried together, with the remaining six defendants tried separately.

In December 2005 it was reported that tensions were building between the Bali Nine drug mules and Sukumaran and Chan. Several days later, lawyers acting for some members of the Bali Nine initially sought the support of the Director of Public Prosecutions to intervene and lay charges for conspiracy to import drugs, so that the nine could be extradited and charged under Australian law. However, the judges hearing the trial matters in Bali called for Australia not to intervene in Indonesia's right to impose capital punishment;. Lawyers acting for Stephens, one of the Bali Nine, claimed that the fairness of his trial was in jeopardy following comments made in the media by Indonesian Foreign Minister Hassan Wirajuda that Australians should be prepared for members of the Bali Nine to receive a death sentence, if found guilty.

=== Sentencing and appeal ===
During his final plea to judges, Norman said:

I made a promise to myself that I would not take drugs or be associated with anybody involved of using drugs. I'd ask you today to give the opportunity to restart my new Christian life, which I have found in jail. I ask with all my heart you will let me have the opportunity to help other people in life. In all honesty I was in the wrong place at the wrong time.

Norman's mother, Robyn Norman, said after sentencing a life sentence was a better result than the death penalty, and also thanked the Indonesian government for looking after her son:

Well, it's better than being shot, I suppose. He's OK. Hopefully they'll keep on looking after him while I'm not here and when I return and spend a bit more time with my son.

On 15 February 2006 Norman was sentenced to life imprisonment. Commenting on the sentences at the time, Australian Federal Police Commissioner Keelty stated:

I stand by the police and what they've done … The Federal Court actually made a decision saying not only had they acted lawfully but they acted in accordance with government policy.

Australian Prime Minister at that time, John Howard was reported as commenting:

The police are there to protect us from the ravages of drugs and I just hope that every young Australian who might in their wildest imagination think that they can get away with this will take a lesson from this.

and

I feel desperately sorry for the parents of these people. I do. All of us as parents will feel that way, but the warnings have been there for decades.

Upon appeal to have the sentence reduced, the Indonesian Supreme Court unexpectedly imposed the death penalty on 6 September 2006. On 5 March 2008, following a full confession by Norman to his role in the plan to import heroin from Bali to Australia, a three-judge panel of the Indonesian Supreme Court in Jakarta ruled to spare the lives of Chen, Norman, and Nguyen by reinstating the original sentence of life imprisonment.

== Release ==
On 15 December 2024, it was announced that Norman, together with the other five convicted people still in prison, had been released and that they were not required to serve any further prison time. The release was made on humanitarian grounds, but the negotiated arrangement between the two governments was not classed as a clemency deal, and no prisoner transfer agreement existed between Australia and Indonesia. Norman and the other four remaining members of the Bali Nine arrived back in Australia on a commercial flight on the evening of the announcement.

== See also ==
- List of Australians in international prisons
- List of Australian criminals
