= Martin Stephens (drug smuggler) =

Australian drug trafficker

- Born: Martin Eric Stephens; 1976 (age 49–50); New South Wales, Australia
- Occupation: Bartender
- Status: Released
- Conviction: Drug trafficking (2006)
- Penalty: Life imprisonment
- Accomplices: Andrew Chan; Si Yi Chen; Michael Czugaj; Tan Duc Thanh Nguyen; Matthew Norman; Renae Lawrence; Scott Rush; Myuran Sukumaran

Details
- Imprisoned at: Malang, East Java, Indonesia

Martin Eric Stephens (born 1976) is an Australian former bartender who was convicted in Indonesia for drug trafficking as a member of the Bali Nine. In 2005, on his first trip to Bali, Stephens was arrested at Ngurah Rai International Airport in Denpasar with 3.3 kg (7.3 lb) of heroin taped to his chest and concealed under his clothing. After a criminal trial, on 14 February 2006 Stephens was sentenced to life imprisonment. His appeal to the Indonesian Supreme Court to have the sentence reduced to 10 years was rejected in January 2011.

== Alleged trafficking conspiracy ==
Stephens, from Towradgi, a suburb of Wollongong, New South Wales, was employed at Eurest, a catering company, where he met Renae Lawrence, Matthew Norman, and his supervisor, Andrew Chan. All four would later be convicted of drug trafficking as fellow members of the Bali Nine.

According to media reports based on the testimony of Renae Lawrence, acting under the instructions of Andrew Chan, Stephens and Lawrence departed Australia on 6 April 2005. The day before, Stephens, Lawrence, and Si Yi Chen met with Myuran Sukumaran where police allege drug smuggling tools such as sealable plastic bags, medical tape, elastic waist bands and skin tight bike shorts were stuffed into the bags of Stephens and Lawrence. Lawrence claimed she was given cash; whilst Stephens claimed that his life was threatened. Media reports claim that police records show that whilst in Bali, Lawrence was in daily contact with Chan until 13 April, when Chan changed his mobile phone number. On the same day, he instructed Stephens and Lawrence, staying at the Kuta Laguna, to change hotels. Together with Chen and Norman, Stephens and Lawrence checked into the Adhi Dharma hotel on 14 April. Indonesian police were in an adjacent room in the same hotel. Nguyen arrived on 16 April, and booked into the same hotel. The original planned departure date of 14 April from Bali was delayed as Chan suspected Australian and Indonesian police were aware of his plans.

On 17 April, Chen, Norman, and Nguyen checked out of the Adhi Dharma hotel, leaving Stephens and Lawrence in the hotel until they departed for the airport.

=== Arrest in Indonesia ===
Stephens was arrested by Indonesian police on 17 April 2005 at Ngurah Rai International Airport in Denpasar, Bali. Heroin weighing 3.3 kg (7.3 lb) was discovered strapped to his legs and chest, concealed underneath his clothing. Scott Rush, Michael Czugaj and Lawrence were arrested at the same time as Stephens. On 20 April 2005, graphic footage of the arrests and subsequent police questioning of Stephens and other members of the Bali Nine was aired on Australian television.

On the same day that Stephens was arrested, Indonesian police also arrested Si Yi Chen, Tan Duc Thanh Nguyen, Myuran Sukumaran and Matthew Norman at the Melasti Hotel in Kuta. Alleged co-ringleader, Andrew Chan was also arrested the same day whilst seated on an Australian Airlines flight waiting to depart Denpasar for Sydney. At the time Chan was arrested, he was carrying three mobile phones and a boarding pass. No drugs were found in his possession.

At the time of the arrest, it was reported that Stephens, speaking with Lawrence, was recorded as saying "Should we dob them in?" Lawrence replied:

"By dobbing some other **** I'm not killing my family. And what's the point anyway, because if we dob them in, right, we dob them in, they kill our family and then we're dead anyway. So, you know, why... Don't tell them and they'll just kill us instead and leave our families alone."

— Renae Lawrence, quoted on ABC TV's 7.30 Report, April 2005.

=== Criticism of Australian Federal Police tipoff ===
Lee Rush, the father of Scott Rush, a fellow member of the Bali Nine, said that he contacted the Australian Federal Police (AFP) prior to the commission of the offence, fearing his son was travelling to Bali and would commit a drug-related crime. Rush senior claims then to have received assurances from the AFP that they would tell his son he was under surveillance to dissuade him from going through with the crime before the group's departure from Indonesia. Scott Rush's lawyers said he was never contacted. It was revealed that the AFP alerted Indonesian police that a crime was to be committed approximately two weeks before the arrests, and had commenced an investigation about ten weeks prior to the arrests. When the Bali Nine were arrested, the news of the tipoff became public and there was criticism of the role of the AFP in protecting the interests of Australian citizens. Commenting on the matter at the time, AFP Commissioner Mick Keelty was reported as saying:

"One of the things we've got to remember is that we operate within our criminal-justice system here in Australia, and if we only co-operated with countries that had the same criminal-justice system, then our co-operation wouldn't extend very far beyond Australia. We have to work with the systems that operate in other countries, and to a large degree this has been successful, certainly in terms of heroin trafficking."

— Australian Federal Police Commissioner Mick Keelty, quoted in The Monthly, July 2007.

Rush took action in the Federal Court of Australia against the AFP for breach of the bilateral treaty between Indonesia and Australia when information was handed by the AFP to the Indonesians. Rush's case claimed that such information should only be released by the Attorney-General. However, the Commonwealth Government maintained that the treaty only applies after a suspect is charged. The application was dismissed by the Federal Court in January 2006.

== Criminal trial ==
Criminal trials for the accused commenced in the Denpasar District Court on 11 October 2005. Chen, Nguyen, and Norman, all arrested at the Melasti Hotel and earning the numeric epithet, The Melasti Three, were tried together, with the remaining six defendants tried separately.

In December 2005, as the trials began, it was reported that tensions were building between the Bali Nine drug mules and Sukumaran and Chan. Several days later, lawyers acting for some members of the Bali Nine initially sought the support of the Australian Director of Public Prosecutions to intervene and lay charges for conspiracy to import drugs, so that the nine could be extradited and charged under Australian law. However, the judges hearing the trial matters in Bali called for Australia not to intervene in Indonesia's right to impose capital punishment;. Lawyers acting for Stephens claimed that the fairness of his trial was in jeopardy following comments made in the media by Indonesian Foreign Minister Hassan Wirajuda that Australians should be prepared for members of the Bali Nine to receive a death sentence, if found guilty.

During his trial, Stephens claims he was forced by Chan to travel to Bali and proceed with the smuggling. Stephens claims that Chan showed him photographs of his family going about their daily lives, and saying they would be killed if he did not cooperate, saying:

"They threatened me. They threatened my family, my friends, my love – my girlfriend… They showed me pictures."

— Stephens, quoted during his trial, reported in April 2005.

Adnan Wirawan, Stephens' lawyer, claimed that his client has been unfairly accused as the ring leader of the alleged conspiracy. "He's a human suitcase... he was being told what to do." During legal proceedings, Czugaj and Rush, fellow members of the Bali Nine who have since been convicted of drug trafficking, testified that they had never met Stephens or Lawrence until they were all arrested on 17 April 2005.

=== Sentencing and appeal ===
Sentences for the majority of the Bali Nine were handed down on 13 February 2006 and 14 February 2006. As Stephens' sentence was about to be handed down, his mother Michelle, speaking from Bali, was reported as saying:

"...faith gave them strength, and asked Australians to think before they judged [her] son."

— Michelle Stephens, mother of Martin Stephens, prior to his sentencing, February 2006.

On 14 February 2006, Stephens was sentenced to life imprisonment.

Commenting on the sentences at the time, Australian Federal Police Commissioner Keelty stated:

"I stand by the police and what they've done … The Federal Court actually made a decision saying not only had they acted lawfully but they acted in accordance with government policy."

— AFP Commissioner Mick Keelty, quoted in The Sydney Morning Herald, 15 February 2006.

The Australian Prime Minister John Howard was reported as commenting:

"The police are there to protect us from the ravages of drugs and I just hope that every young Australian who might in their wildest imagination think that they can get away with this will take a lesson from this." ...... "I feel desperately sorry for the parents of these people. I do. All of us as parents will feel that way, but the warnings have been there for decades."

— Australian Prime Minister John Howard, February 2006.

As verdicts and sentences were handed down in the trials of the Bali Nine, additional arrests were made in Australia.

Stephens, along with eight other members of the Bali Nine, appealed the severity of their sentence. On 26 April 2006, the Indonesian Supreme Court reduced the life imprisonment sentences to 20-years for each of Lawrence, Nguyen, Chen, Czugaj and Norman, all arrested at Melasti Hotel in Kuta. Stephens' appeal was upheld.

== Prison life ==
In December 2009, Stephens announced he planned to marry Christine Winarni Puspayanti, an Indonesian woman he met at Kerobokan Prison. Stephens met Puspayanti months after his arrest while she was visiting the prison as a part of a church group; and they married in a traditional Indonesian-style wedding in April 2011.

In 2014, Stephens and Nguyen were transferred to a prison in Malang, East Java when it was reported that they had violated prison rules.

On 15 December 2024, Stephens and the other four remaining members of the Bali Nine arrived back in Australia on a commercial flight. He will not be required to serve any further prison time in the country.

== See also ==
- List of Australians in international prisons
- List of Australian criminals
