= Tan Duc Thanh Nguyen =

Vietnamese-Australian drug trafficker

Thanh Nguyen
- Born: 30 October 1983; Palawan, Philippines
- Died: 9 May 2018 (aged 34); Jakarta, Indonesia
- Other name: David Nguyen
- Organization: Bali Nine
- Status: Deceased
- Conviction: Drug trafficking (2006)
- Penalty: Life imprisonment
- Accomplices: Andrew Chan; Si Yi Chen; Michael Czugaj; Renae Lawrence; Matthew Norman; Scott Rush; Martin Stephens; Myuran Sukumaran

Details
- Imprisoned at: Malang, East Java, Indonesia

Tan Duc Thanh Nguyen (Vietnamese: Tân Đức Thanh Nguyễn; 30 October 1983 – 9 May 2018) was a Vietnamese–Australian citizen. He was convicted in Indonesia for drug trafficking as a member of the Bali Nine. In 2005, Nguyen was arrested in a room at the Melasti Hotel in Kuta, Bali together with three others. Police uncovered 334 g (11.8 oz) of heroin in a suitcase in the room. After a criminal trial, on 15 February 2006 Nguyen was sentenced to life imprisonment. His appeal to the Indonesian Supreme Court to have the sentence reduced suffered a shock when the Supreme Court imposed the death penalty on 6 September 2006.

A subsequent appeal to the Indonesian Supreme Court, following a full confession by Nguyen of his role in the plan to import heroin from Bali to Australia, resulted in the original sentence of life imprisonment being reinstated. Some media reports claimed Nguyen was believed to be a financer of the smuggling plan.

An Indonesian justice ministry official announced on 5 June 2018 that Nguyen had died of stomach cancer on 9 May.

== Trafficking conspiracy ==
Media reports based on the testimony of co-conspirator, Renae Lawrence, claim that Nguyen (going by the alias of David), from Wellington Point in Brisbane, Queensland, had arranged an earlier attempt at trafficking from Indonesia to Australia. This attempt in December 2004 involved Lawrence, Andrew Chan, Matthew Norman and others. The delivery was aborted when heroin suppliers failed to deliver "due to a financial matter or someone knowing about the plan the shipment was cancelled".

Further media reports, again based on court testimonies, claim that Nguyen met Michael Czugaj and Scott Rush (both Brisbane school friends) in a pub in Fortitude Valley where Nguyen reportedly offered Rush and Czugaj an all-expenses-paid trip to Bali.

Arriving in Bali on or about 8 April 2005, Rush and Czugaj met co-ringleaders Myuran Sukumaran and Andrew Chan at the Hard Rock Hotel, and also Renae Lawrence and Martin Stephens. On 14 April, Norman, Si Yi Chen, Lawrence and Stephens checked into Adhi Dharma hotel in Bali, with Nguyen arriving in the same hotel two days later. In the evening of Sunday 17 April, acting like tourists, Nguyen, Norman, and Chen checked into the Melasti Hotel. Myuran Sukumaran, who was also with them, with his bags, left them with the others as he decided to go to the Hard Rock Hotel complex.

All were later convicted of drug trafficking as fellow members of the Bali Nine.

=== Arrest in Indonesia ===
Approximately 20 minutes after checking in, Nguyen was arrested at the Melasti Hotel in Kuta on 17 April 2005 with Matthew Norman, Myuran Sukumaran and Si Yi Chen. Indonesian police claim the group were in possession of 334 g (11.8 oz) of heroin and bundles of plastic wrapping, Elastoplast tape, and a set of scales, indicating involvement in a plan to transport drugs to Australia.

Earlier that day at Ngurah Rai International Airport in Denpasar, Indonesian police also arrested the following drug mules after they were found carrying various amounts of heroin concealed on their bodies. Martin Stephens was found to be carrying 3.3 kg (7.3 lb); Renae Lawrence was found to be carrying 2.689 kg (5.93 lb); Michael Czugaj was found to be carrying 1.75 kg (3.9 lb) and Scott Rush was found to be carrying 1.3 kg (2.9 lb) of heroin. Co-ringleader Andrew Chan was also arrested the same day while seated on an Australian Airlines flight waiting to depart Denpasar for Sydney. At the time of his arrest, Chan was carrying three mobile phones and a boarding pass. No drugs were found in his possession.

=== Criticism of Australian Federal Police tipoff ===
Lee Rush, the father of Scott Rush, a fellow member of the Bali Nine, said that he contacted the Australian Federal Police (AFP) prior to the commission of the offence, fearing his son was travelling to Bali and would commit a drug-related crime. Rush senior claims then to have received assurances from the AFP that they would tell his son he was under surveillance to dissuade him from going through with the crime before the group's departure from Indonesia. Scott Rush's lawyers said he was never contacted. It was revealed that the AFP alerted Indonesian police that a crime was to be committed approximately two weeks before the arrests, and had commenced an investigation about ten weeks prior to the arrests.

When the Bali Nine were arrested, the news of the tipoff became public and there was criticism of the role of the AFP in protecting the interests of Australian citizens. Commenting on the matter at the time, AFP Commissioner Mick Keelty was reported as saying:

"One of the things we've got to remember is that we operate within our criminal-justice system here in Australia, and if we only co-operated with countries that had the same criminal-justice system, then our co-operation wouldn't extend very far beyond Australia. We have to work with the systems that operate in other countries, and to a large degree this has been successful, certainly in terms of heroin trafficking."

— Australian Federal Police Commissioner Mick Keelty, quoted in The Monthly, July 2007.

Rush took action in the Federal Court of Australia against the AFP for breach of the bilateral treaty between Indonesia and Australia when information was handed by the AFP to the Indonesians. Rush's case claimed that such information should only be released by the Attorney-General. However, the Commonwealth Government maintained that the treaty only applies after a suspect is charged. The application was dismissed by the Federal Court in January 2006.

== Criminal trial ==
Criminal trials for the accused commenced in the Denpasar District Court on 11 October 2005. Chen, Nguyen, and Norman, all arrested at the Melasti Hotel and earning the epithet, The Melasti Three, were tried together, with the remaining six defendants tried separately.

In December 2005, it was reported that tensions were building between the Bali Nine drug mules and Sukumaran and Chan. Several days later, lawyers acting for some members of the Bali Nine initially sought the support of the Director of Public Prosecutions to intervene and lay charges for conspiracy to import drugs, so that the nine could be extradited and charged under Australian law. However, the judges hearing the trial matters in Bali called on Australia not to interfere in Indonesia's right to impose capital punishment;. Lawyers acting for Stephens, one of the Bali Nine, claimed that the fairness of his trial was in jeopardy following comments made in the media by Indonesian Foreign Minister Hassan Wirajuda that Australians should be prepared for members of the Bali Nine to receive a death sentence, if found guilty.

During his trial, Nguyen was accused of both recruiting members and financing the drug importation scheme. Czugaj, since convicted, stated that he travelled to Bali, with school friend Scott Rush, after Rush introduced him to Nguyen. Their reason for travel was that Nguyen offered them both a free holiday to Bali. When asked why he chose to travel to Bali on a paid holiday, Rush replied:

"Basically we got the response that [Nguyen] didn't have anyone to come to Bali with him". Nguyen refused to testify; Czugaj confirmed Rush's account of events as being true.

=== Sentencing and appeal ===
During his final plea to judges, Nguyen said:

"I basically stand here before you to tell you that I love Indonesia and I would never intentionally damage or hurt her reputation. I only wanted to come here. If given a chance I would definitely recommend this holiday island to many friends and family. As the only and oldest son in the family I was the one who supported my four younger sisters, and I paid for the groceries and my sisters' education and school needs, so how could I possibly be the financier? The impact on my family has left them shattered and truly devastated, and our lives will never be the same again."

— Nguyen, quoted in his final plea prior to his sentencing, February 2006.

On 15 February 2006, Nguyen was sentenced to life imprisonment. Commenting on the sentences at the time, Australian Federal Police Commissioner Keelty stated:

"I stand by the police and what they've done … The Federal Court actually made a decision saying not only had they acted lawfully but they acted in accordance with government policy."

— AFP Commissioner Mick Keelty, quoted in The Sydney Morning Herald, 15 February 2006.

The Australian Prime Minister John Howard was reported as commenting:

"The police are there to protect us from the ravages of drugs and I just hope that every young Australian who might in their wildest imagination think that they can get away with this will take a lesson from this."

— Australian Prime Minister John Howard, February 2006.

Appealing against the sentence, on 6 September 2006, his sentence was upgraded to the death penalty. On 5 March 2008, three judges in the Indonesian Supreme Court in Jakarta decided to spare the lives of Nguyen, Chen, and Norman.

== Prison life ==
After initially serving time in Bali's Kerobokan Prison, in 2014 Nguyen and Stephens were transferred to a prison in Malang, East Java when it was reported that they had violated prison rules.

== Death ==
Nguyen died from cancer on 9 May 2018 in a Jakarta hospital, aged 34, confirmed by the Department of Foreign Affairs and Trade.

== See also ==
- List of Australians in international prisons
- List of Australian criminals
