= Renae Lawrence =

Australian woman (born 1977)

- Born: 11 October 1977 (age 49)
- Occupation: Catering worker
- Status: Released
- Conviction: Drug trafficking (2006)
- Penalty: Life imprisonment; commuted to 20 years imprisonment
- Accomplices: Andrew Chan; Si Yi Chen; Michael Czugaj; Tan Duc Thanh Nguyen; Matthew Norman; Scott Rush; Martin Stephens; Myuran Sukumaran
- Comments: Sentence commuted (2018)

Details
- Imprisoned at: Bali, Indonesia

Renae Lawrence (born 11 October 1977) is an Australian woman who was convicted in Indonesia for drug trafficking as a member of the Bali Nine.

In April 2005, on her third trip to Bali, Lawrence was arrested at Ngurah Rai International Airport in Denpasar with 2.689 kg (5.93 lb) of heroin concealed on her body. After a criminal trial in which she cooperated with investigators and informed on the ringleaders, she was sentenced on 13 February 2006 to life imprisonment. Her appeal to the Indonesian Supreme Court to have the life sentence reduced to 20 years was successful on 26 April 2006.

Lawrence was moved from Kerobokan Prison in late 2013 to a prison in Negara, Bali after authorities accused her of a plot to kill prison guards. At her own request in March 2014, Lawrence was subsequently transferred to a prison in Bangli to be closer to Denpasar for her family and visitors.

When given a five-month remission of sentence on Indonesia's Independence Day in 2009, Lawrence’s sentence was commuted in 2018. She was released and deported on 21 November 2018.

== Background ==
Lawrence, from Newcastle, New South Wales, lived for a decade with her same sex partner, who was ten years her senior. After this relationship ended in October 2004, Lawrence moved back in with her mother and stepfather. Her biological father described Lawrence, who was 27 at the time of her arrest, as being naïve and unworldly.

Initially employed as a trainee panel beater with a smash repair company, Lawrence later gained employment at Eurest, a catering company, where she met Martin Stephens, Matthew Norman, and her supervisor, Andrew Chan. All four were later convicted of drug trafficking as members of the Bali Nine.

== Alleged trafficking conspiracy ==
Media reports claim that in early October 2004 Lawrence was invited to Chan's Enfield (Sydney) home to celebrate her 27th birthday. Chan allegedly told her that she was to travel with him to Bali without being told the detail behind the mission. Lawrence claimed that Chan would cover all flights and accommodation. However, if she disobeyed him or disclosed the nature of their arrangement, he would harm her family. Conversely, Lawrence would be rewarded for following instructions. It was also reported that she met Myuran Sukumaran around this time. On 16 October 2004, Lawrence flew to Bali on what Indonesian police claim was a false passport. It was alleged that Chan entered Bali on the same date. Lawrence claimed that she was in regular contact with Chan whilst she stayed in the Istana Rama Hotel in Kuta, and Chan in Kuta's sprawling Hard Rock complex. Media reports stated that Lawrence alleged that on 22 October 2004, Sukumaran strapped packages to the body of both Lawrence and Chan, and with Chan's girlfriend, Grace, boarded a commercial flight to Australia, successfully clearing security, customs and immigration in both Indonesia and Australia. Lawrence claimed that she and Chan were met at the airport, the packages removed, all of them taken to another house, and then Lawrence went home. A few days later Lawrence claimed that Chan handed her an envelope with A$10,000 cash.

A similar trip was organised following Chan's orders, Lawrence claimed, where she departed Australia on 5 December 2004. Lawrence claimed that seven others were involved, including Chan, Matthew Norman, and Tan Duc Thanh Nguyen (going by the alias of David). Lawrence claim that she was again given cash to purchase flights and accommodation for eight days, staying again at the Istana Rama in Kuta. However, the second delivery was aborted when heroin suppliers failed to deliver "due to a financial matter or someone knowing about the plan the shipment was cancelled".

According to Lawrence, again under Chan's instructions, Lawrence departed Australia on 6 April 2005. The day before, Lawrence, Stephens and Si Yi Chen met with Sukumaran where police allege drug smuggling tools such as sealable plastic bags, medical tape, elastic waist bands and skin tight bike shorts were stuffed into the bags of Lawrence and Stephens. Lawrence claims she was given cash; whilst Stephens claims that his life was threatened. Media reports claim that police records show that Lawrence was in daily contact with Chan, whilst in Bali, until 13 April, when Chan changed his mobile phone number. On the same day, he instructed Lawrence and other members of the Bali Nine to change hotels. The original planned departure date of 14 April from Bali was delayed as Chan suspected Australian and Indonesian police were aware of his plans.

=== Arrest in Indonesia ===
Lawrence was arrested by Indonesian police on 17 April 2005 at Ngurah Rai International Airport in Denpasar, Bali. Heroin weighing 2.689 kg (5.93 lb) was discovered strapped to her legs and chest, concealed underneath her clothing. Scott Rush, Michael Czugaj and Stephens were arrested at the same time as Lawrence. On 20 April 2005, graphic footage of the arrests and subsequent police questioning of Lawrence and other members of the Bali Nine was aired on Australian television.

On the same day that Lawrence was arrested, Indonesian police also arrested Chen, Nguyen, Sukumaran and Norman at the Melasti Hotel in Kuta. Alleged co-ringleader, Chan was also arrested the same day whilst seated on an Australian Airlines flight waiting to depart Denpasar for Sydney. At the time Chan was arrested, he was carrying three mobile phones and a boarding pass. No drugs were found in his possession. On her arrest, Lawrence accused Chan of threatening her life if she did not continue with the plan to import drugs. Lawrence also claimed, but later retracted her statement that Chan had offered her A$15,000 if she followed his instructions. Lawrence also rejected police allegations that she travelled to Bali previously on a false passport.

=== Criticism of Australian Federal Police tipoff ===
Lee Rush, the father of Scott Rush (a fellow member of the Bali Nine) said that he contacted the Australian Federal Police (AFP) prior to the commission of the offence, fearing his son was travelling to Bali and would commit a drug-related crime. Rush senior claims then to have received assurances from the AFP that they would tell his son he was under surveillance to dissuade him from going through with the crime before the group's departure from Indonesia. Scott Rush's lawyers said he was never contacted. It was revealed that the AFP alerted Indonesian police that a crime was to be committed approximately two weeks before the arrests, and had commenced an investigation about ten weeks prior to the arrests. When the Bali Nine were arrested, the news of the tipoff became public and there was criticism of the role of the AFP in protecting the interests of Australian citizens.

Commenting on the matter at the time, AFP Commissioner Mick Keelty was reported as saying:

"One of the things we've got to remember is that we operate within our criminal-justice system here in Australia, and if we only co-operated with countries that had the same criminal-justice system, then our co-operation wouldn't extend very far beyond Australia. We have to work with the systems that operate in other countries, and to a large degree this has been successful, certainly in terms of heroin trafficking."

— Australian Federal Police Commissioner Mick Keelty, quoted in The Monthly, July 2007.

Rush took action in the Federal Court of Australia against the AFP for breach of the bilateral treaty between Indonesia and Australia when information was handed by the AFP to the Indonesians. Rush's case claimed that such information should only be released by the Attorney-General. However, the Commonwealth Government maintained that the treaty only applies after a suspect is charged. The application was dismissed by the Federal Court in January 2006.

== Criminal trial ==
In December 2005, as the trials began, it was reported that tensions were building between the Bali Nine drug mules and Sukumaran and Chan. Several days later, lawyers acting for some members of the Bali Nine initially sought the support of the Director of Public Prosecutions to intervene and lay charges for conspiracy to import drugs, so that the nine could be extradited and charged under Australian law. However, the judges hearing the trial matters in Bali called for Australia not to intervene in Indonesia's right to impose capital punishment. Lawyers acting for Stephens, one of the Bali Nine, claimed the fairness of his trial was in jeopardy following comments made in the media by Indonesian Foreign Minister Hassan Wirajuda that Australians should be prepared for members of the Bali Nine to receive a death sentence, if found guilty.

Czugaj and Rush, both since convicted members of the Bali Nine and school friends from Brisbane, testified that they had never met Lawrence or Stephens until they were all arrested together at Ngurah Rai Airport. Rush also testified against Lawrence at her trial; whilst Lawrence testified against both Rush and Chan. Meanwhile, in a counter-claim, Chan alleged that it was Lawrence who was the ringleader. Chan claimed that Lawrence had given him Rp1 million to take suitcases with heroin to the Melasti Hotel.

It was reported that the indictment claimed that Lawrence was a drug mule who was recruited in Sydney, was paid for her return flight and accommodation to Bali by members of the conspiracy and then had 2 kilograms (4.4 lb) of heroin strapped to her body by Chan, Sukumaran and another of the group. Central to Lawrence's defence was her fear of Chan and the alleged retributions Chan, her former manager at Eurest, was planning to take on her family if she and others did not follow Chan's orders. Lawrence admitted to her role in attempting to smuggle the drugs to Australia, saying before the Denpasar District Court on 8 January 2006:

"I would like to say to you and your country that I am sincerely sorry for what I have done. I need you to understand why I did it and ask for the mercy of this court. I'm guilty of carrying this stuff to Australia, but I'm not guilty of owning, selling or anything else because Andrew Chan owns it, not me."

— Lawrence, quoted at her trial before the Denpasar District Court, January 2006.

=== Sentencing and appeal ===
In spite of widespread media reports that Lawrence had been cooperative with police, the Indonesian judges found no evidence of Lawrence claims her life was threatened. Judge I Gusti Ngurah Astawa said during sentencing:

"The council of judges found no proof of the use of force in this crime, therefore the defendant has to be sentenced as fairly as possible."

— Judge I Gusti Ngurah Astawa, quoted during the sentencing of Lawrence, February 2006.

In what was an apparent shock for Lawrence and her defence team, she was sentenced on 13 February 2006 to life imprisonment, together with Rush. Commenting on the sentences at the time, Australian Federal Police Commissioner Keelty stated:

"I stand by the police and what they've done … The Federal Court actually made a decision saying not only had they acted lawfully but they acted in accordance with government policy."

— AFP Commissioner Mick Keelty, quoted in The Sydney Morning Herald, 15 February 2006.

The Australian Prime Minister John Howard was reported as commenting:

"The police are there to protect us from the ravages of drugs and I just hope that every young Australian who might in their wildest imagination think that they can get away with this will take a lesson from this."..... "I feel desperately sorry for the parents of these people. I do. All of us as parents will feel that way, but the warnings have been there for decades."

— Australian Prime Minister John Howard, February 2006.

As verdicts and sentences were handed down in the trials of the Bali Nine, additional arrests were made in Australia.

== Prison life ==
In 2005, Lawrence reportedly attempted suicide twice in prison and also suffered a broken arm due to a self harm incident. These incidents occurred after learning that Andrew Chan was to be moved to the same prison.

In June 2006, Lawrence claimed she had a Balinese girlfriend with whom she shared a prison cell. Lawrence and Schapelle Corby, both serving time for drug trafficking in Kerobokan Prison, developed a close but at times fraught relationship. In an interview with Woman's Day magazine, Lawrence said she was appointed to care for Corby and had watched Corby's mental stability deteriorate.

== Commutation ==
Lawrence appealed the sentence to the Indonesian Supreme Court. On 26 April 2006, a sentence of 20 years imprisonment was handed down. In November 2018 her sentence was commuted, and she was released and deported to Australia on 21 November 2018.

== Return to Australia ==
Upon return to Australia in November 2018, Lawrence handed herself in to NSW Police pursuant to outstanding warrants for car theft, driving unlicensed, exceeding the speed limit by 40 km/h and failing to stop for police on 26 March 2005. Lawrence was due to appear on 26 April 2005 in the Gosford Magistrates Court. However, due to her arrest in Indonesia nine days earlier, she failed to appear. In November 2018, Lawrence was released on bail for subsequent hearing in Newcastle Local Court on 6 December 2018. The case was then adjourned until 17 January 2019, at which time Lawrence's lawyer entered a guilty plea for sentencing on 1 February 2019, and was given a $1,000.00 fine with a twelve-month Community Corrections Order.
