= List of Australians imprisoned or executed abroad =

This list of Australians imprisoned or executed abroad includes those cases where:

- the person was arrested and charged with or convicted of notable crimes whilst abroad.
- the person is an otherwise notable person in Australia.

== Argentina ==
Prisoner	From	Convictions	Arrested	Release date	Notes
Stephen John Sutton	Sydney, New South Wales	Drug trafficking	4 February 2003	November 2008	Sentenced to 11 years. Released from prison in November 2008.

== Bulgaria ==
Prisoner	From	Convictions	Arrested	Release date	Notes
Jock Palfreeman	Sydney, New South Wales	Murder and wounding	December 2007	Paroled in September 2019	Sentenced to 20 years' jail.

== Cambodia ==
Prisoner	From	Convictions	Arrested	Release date	Notes
Gordon Vuong	Campsie, New South Wales	Drug trafficking (heroin)	January 2005	2018	Sentenced to 13 years in May 2005.

== China ==
Prisoner	From	Convictions	Arrested	Release date	Notes
Francis James	Sydney, New South Wales	None (accused of espionage)	4 November 1969	16 January 1973	Australian publisher, detained without trial until deportation.
Stern Hu	China	Stealing commercial secrets and receiving bribes	5 July 2009	July 2018	Australian iron ore enterprise businessman. Sentenced to 10 years' jail.
Kalynda Davis	Sydney, New South Wales	No conviction	8 November 2014	9 December 2014	Arrested for allegedly smuggling 30kg of Crystal Meth and faced execution if convicted.; Australian Foreign Minister Julie Bishop intervened and negotiated Davis' release.; No conviction – returned to Australia free.
Henry Chin	Sydney, New South Wales	Convicted of trying to send 270 grams of methamphetamine to Australia	May 2004		Sentenced to death in 2005. The sentence was suspended for two years. Current fate is unknown.
Karm Gilespie	Ballarat, Victoria	Smuggling 7.5 kg of methamphetamine out of China	2013		Death sentence announced on 10 June 2020 by Guangzhou District Court after having been missing for 7 years.

== Colombia ==
Prisoner	From	Convictions	Arrested	Release date	Notes
Cassandra Sainsbury	Adelaide, South Australia	Drug trafficking (cocaine)	11 April 2017	16 April 2020	Sentenced to 6 years' imprisonment. Paroled after 3 years; remained in Colombia for 23 months and deported.

== Egypt ==
Prisoner	From	Convictions	Arrested	Release date	Notes
Peter Greste	Brisbane, Queensland	Using unlicensed equipment to broadcast false information to defame and destabilise Egypt	29 December 2013	1 February 2015 (deported)	23 June 2014: Sentenced to seven years' jail.; 1 January 2015: Court of Cassation announced retrial.; 1 February 2015: Deported to Australia to face prison or trial in his home country. (Australia not uphold either).; 29 August 2015: Egyptian retrial sentenced Greste in absentia to another three years. Sentence avoided because he did not return to Egypt.; If full sentences served, Greste would have been incarcerated until December 2023.

== Fiji ==
Prisoner	From	Convictions	Arrested	Release date	Notes
Thomas McCosker	Warrnambool, Victoria	Sodomy	3 April 2005	28 August 2005	Sentenced to 2 years' jail for sodomy.; Conviction overturned on constitutional grounds on 26 August 2005.

== Indonesia ==
Prisoner	From	Convictions	Arrested	Release date	Notes
Schapelle Corby	Gold Coast, Queensland	Drug trafficking (cannabis)	8 October 2004	10 February 2014	Sentenced in 2005 to 20 years.; Sentence reduced on appeal in 2005 to 15 years.; Sentence increased on further appeal in 2005 to 20 years.; Released from Kerobokan Prison on Monday 10 February 2014 after being granted parole on Friday 7 February 2014. Of her original 20-year sentence, Corby only served 9 years and 259 days.
Andrew Chan	Enfield, New South Wales	Drug trafficking (heroin)	17 April 2005	Executed	Sentenced to death on 14 February 2006.; Executed by firing squad on 29 April 2015.
Si Yi Chen	Doonside, New South Wales	Drug trafficking (heroin)	17 April 2005	15 December 2024	Sentenced to life imprisonment on 15 February 2006.; Sentence reduced to 20 years on 27 April 2006.; Sentence increased to the death penalty on 6 September 2006.; Sentence reduced to life imprisonment on 15 March 2008.
Michael Czugaj	Oxley, Queensland	Drug trafficking (heroin)	17 April 2005	15 December 2024	Sentenced to life imprisonment on 14 February 2006.; Sentence reduced to 20 years on 27 April 2006.; Sentence increased to life on 6 September 2006.
Tan Duc Thanh Nguyen	Wellington Point, Queensland	Drug trafficking (heroin)	17 April 2005	Died 9 May 2018	Sentenced to life imprisonment on 15 February 2006.; Sentence reduced to 20 years on 27 April 2006.; Sentence increased to the death penalty on 6 September 2006.; Sentence reduced to life imprisonment on 15 March 2008.; Died from stomach cancer on 9 May 2018
Matthew Norman	Quakers Hill, New South Wales	Drug trafficking (heroin)	17 April 2005	15 December 2024	Sentenced to life imprisonment on 15 February 2006.; Sentence reduced to 20 years on 27 April 2006.; Sentence increased to the death penalty on 6 September 2006.; Sentence reduced to life imprisonment in March 2008.
Scott Rush	Chelmer, Queensland	Drug trafficking (heroin)	17 April 2005	15 December 2024	Sentenced to life imprisonment on 13 February 2006.; Sentence increased to the death penalty on 6 September 2006.; Sentence reduced to life imprisonment upon 11 May 2011 on appeal to the Indonesian Supreme Court.
Martin Stephens	Towradgi, New South Wales	Drug trafficking (heroin)	17 April 2005	15 December 2024	Sentenced to life imprisonment on 14 February 2006.
Myuran Sukumaran	Auburn, New South Wales	Drug trafficking (heroin)	17 April 2005	Executed	Sentenced to death on 14 February 2006.; Executed by firing squad on 29 April 2015.
Renae Lawrence	Newcastle, New South Wales	Drug trafficking (heroin)	17 April 2005	21 November 2018	Sentenced to life imprisonment on 13 February 2006.; Sentence reduced to 20 years on 27 April 2006.; Released and deported on 21 November 2018
Michelle Leslie	Adelaide, South Australia	Possession of ecstasy tablets	21 August 2005	19 November 2005	Controversially declared herself a Muslim during her imprisonment.; It was alleged that some of her lawyers distributed bribes to secure her freedom.
Michael Sacatides	Wentworthville, New South Wales	Drug trafficking (methamphetamine)	1 October 2010		Sentenced in 2011 to 18 years in Bali's Kerobokan Jail.

A prisoner exchange agreement is currently being negotiated between Australia and Indonesia.

== Israel ==
Prisoner	From	Convictions	Arrested	Release date	Notes
Denis Michael Rohan	Sydney	Arson attack	23 August 1969	14 May 1974	Found to be insane, and hospitalised in a mental institution. Deported from Israel 14 May 1974, he was reported to have died in 1995 under psychiatric care, but later found alive and interviewed by the ABC in 2009, before eventually dying in 2013.

== Kuwait ==
Prisoner	From	Convictions	Arrested	Release date	Notes
Tallaal Adrey	Auburn, New South Wales	Weapons possession Weapons trading Ammunition possession Ammunition trading	14 February 2005	2009	Sentenced to 4 years.

== Laos ==
Prisoner	From	Convictions	Arrested	Release date	Notes
Kerry and Kay Danes	Brisbane, Queensland	Tax evasion Embezzlement; Destruction of evidence (pardoned and absolved)	23 December 2000	6 October 2001	Sentenced to seven years prison each; The Australian government intervened; Provisionally released 6 October 2001; The Danes agreed to pay court-ordered $AUD1.1 million in fines and compensation in four equal instalments; Presidential pardon 6 November 2001; Pardon absolved the Danes convictions; Both returned to Australia free

== Marshall Islands ==
Prisoner	From	Convictions	Arrested	Release date	Notes
Carl Heine	Singleton, New South Wales	No trial	1942	Executed	Executed by beheading in April 1944.

== Malaysia ==
Prisoner	From	Convictions	Arrested	Release date	Notes
Kevin Barlow (a dual British citizen)	Perth, Western Australia	Drug trafficking (heroin)	9 November 1983	Executed	Executed by hanging on 7 July 1986.
Brian Chambers	Perth, Western Australia	Drug trafficking (heroin)	9 November 1983	Executed	Executed by hanging on 7 July 1986.
Michael McAuliffe	Sydney, New South Wales	Drug trafficking (heroin)	29 June 1985	Executed	Executed by hanging in June 1993.
Maria Elvira Pinto Exposto	Sydney, New South Wales	Drug trafficking (methamphetamine)	December 2014	26 November 2019	Acquitted by the Malaysian High Court and ordered immediate release.

== New Zealand ==
Prisoner	From	Convictions	Arrested	Release date	Notes
Brenton Tarrant	Grafton, New South Wales	Murder; Attempted murder Terrorism	15 March 2019		Trial date listed for 2 June 2020. Sentenced to life imprisonment without parole on 27 August 2020

== North Korea ==
Prisoner	From	Convictions	Arrested	Release date	Notes
John Short	Barmera, South Australia	Circulation of Christian literature at a Buddhist temple	16 February 2014	3 March 2014	Was originally arrested for missionary work in North Korea.; He subsequently apologised on television.; Released 3 March 2014 and was deported.

== Philippines ==
Prisoner	From	Convictions	Arrested	Release date	Notes
Peter Scully	Melbourne, Victoria	Human trafficking, rape, sexual abuse and torture of children	20 February 2015		Sentenced to life in prison in 2018, and received an additional 129 years for a second conviction in 2022.

== Singapore ==
Prisoner	From	Convictions	Arrested	Release date	Notes
Robert Page and nine others	Various – members of Z Special Unit	Perfidy and espionage (Operation Rimau)	December 1944 – January 1945	Executed	Executed by beheading on 7 July 1945.
Van Tuong Nguyen	Melbourne, Victoria	Drug trafficking (heroin)	12 December 2002	Executed	Executed by hanging on 2 December 2005.

== South African Republic (Transvaal) ==
Prisoner	From	Convictions	Arrested	Release date	Notes
Harry Harbord 'Breaker' Morant	Queensland, New South Wales and South Australia	War crimes	23 October 1901	Executed	Executed by firing squad on 27 February 1902.
Peter Handcock	New South Wales	War crimes	23 October 1901	Executed	Executed by firing squad on 27 February 1902.
George Witton	Victoria, Australia	War crimes	23 October 1901	11 August 1904	Sentenced to death by firing squad, which was commuted to life in prison. Released early due to public and political pressure in England and Australia.

== Sri Lanka ==
Prisoner	From	Convictions	Arrested	Release date	Notes
Reg Spiers	Adelaide, South Australia	Drug trafficking (heroin)	1 December 1984	1987	Sentenced to death, acquitted on appeal.

== Thailand ==
Prisoner	From	Convictions	Arrested	Release date	Notes
Warren Fellows	Sydney, New South Wales	Drug trafficking (heroin)	11 October 1978	11 January 1990	Sentenced to life, received a pardon.
Paul Hayward	Sydney, New South Wales	Drug trafficking (heroin)	11 October 1978	7 April 1989	Sentenced to 30 years, received a pardon.
Nola Blake	Botany, New South Wales	Drug trafficking (heroin)	January 1987	March 1998	Originally sentenced to death, later commuted to life in prison. Received a Royal Pardon.
Holly Deane-Johns	Western Australia	Drug trafficking (heroin)	August 2000	December 2012	Sentenced to 31 years. Transferred to Bandyup Women's Prison in Australia in late 2007.
Robert Halliwell	Sydney	Drug trafficking (heroin)	August 2000		Arrested with Deane-Johns whilst attempting to post heroin to Australia. Police later found another 110 grams of heroin in Halliwell's apartment. Sentenced to life imprisonment.

A prisoner exchange agreement exists between Australia and Thailand allowing prisoner transfers.

== United Arab Emirates ==
Prisoner	From	Convictions	Arrested	Release date	Notes
Samandar Hout Kilani	Afghanistan / Australia	Robbery	July 2011	September 2013	3 year prison sentence in Dubai's Central Jail.

== United Kingdom ==
Prisoner	From	Convictions	Arrested	Release date	Notes
Rolf Harris	Bassendean, Western Australia	Indecent assault	August 2013	19 May 2017	Sentenced to 5 years and 9 months' imprisonment on 4 July 2014.
Julian Assange	Townsville, Queensland	Skipping bail	11 April 2019	26 June 2024	Sentenced to 50 weeks' imprisonment on 1 May 2019

== United States ==
Prisoner	From	Convictions	Arrested	Release date	Notes
Jean-Philippe Wispelaere	Canberra, Australian Capital Territory	Espionage	15 May 1999	2012	Former Defence Intelligence Organisation officer who sought to sell secrets to a foreign power.
Mamdouh Habib	Sydney, New South Wales	none	5 October 2001	28 January 2005	Arrested in 2001, Habib was interrogated by Pakistani and US CIA agents before being transferred to Egypt, then to a black site in Afghanistan, where he was further interrogated under torture. Transferred to Guantanamo Bay detention camp in 2002. Released without charge in 2005.
David Hicks	Adelaide, South Australia	Unlawful combatant	November 2001	1 January 2008	Prisoner of the US Government held at Guantanamo Bay, Cuba on unlawful combatant charges. Returned to Australia on 20 May 2007 to serve the remaining nine months of his sentence in Yatala Labour Prison, Adelaide.
Russell Moore (Note: Also known by adoptive name, James Hudson Savage.)	Melbourne, Victoria	Murder; Robbery; Sexual assault	1988	Deceased	Sentenced to life imprisonment without parole in 1991 for the murder, robbery and sexual assault of Barbara Barber in Melbourne, Florida. Died in custody at the Apalachee Correctional Institution on 2 June 2021.

== Vietnam ==
Prisoner	From	Convictions	Arrested	Release date	Notes
Phạm Trung Dũng	Vietnam / Australia	Drug trafficking (heroin)	May 2013		Sentenced to death on 27 June 2014.

== See also ==
- Anti-Australian sentiment
- Department of Foreign Affairs and Trade (Australia)
- Foreign relations of Australia
- List of Australian criminals
- Use of death penalty worldwide
