= Gordon Vuong =

Australian drug smuggler

Gordon Vuong (born 1989) is an Australian serving a 13-year sentence in Cambodia for attempting to smuggle 2.1 kg of heroin concealed on his body from Phnom Penh to Australia. He was arrested at Phnom Penh International Airport on 22 January 2005 and sentenced in May 2005 at the age of 16.

Two other men, Cambodian-Australian Yin Karat, 26, and Cambodian national Ek Sam Oeun, were arrested at the same time and have been charged with helping to conceal the drugs on Vuong's body. In July 2005, Yin Karat was sentenced to 18 years imprisonment and Ek Sam Oeun, 10 years.

Vuong's sentence was of concern to Australian civil liberties groups as a juvenile would never receive a sentence of that length in Australia.

Vuong's mother, Hong Ta, has stated that she approached the Australian Federal Police and the New South Wales police with concerns that her son was being used as a drug mule and that the police alerted Cambodian authorities, resulting in the arrest. A letter from the AFP to Cambodian authorities dated five days before Vuong's arrest was detailed in The Bulletin:

Gordon Vuong has been brought to Phnom Penh by Yen Karath [a 25-year-old Cambodian-born Australian who was also arrested and jailed] to carry heroin from Hong Kong to Australia. We do not know whether Vuong will carry the heroin from Phnom Penh to Hong Kong or collect it in Hong Kong. We do not know when Vuong is leaving Phnom Penh for Hong Kong.

Former Federal Minister for Justice and Customs, Senator Chris Ellison denied the tip-off, contradicting the letter's contents.

The Australian Federal Police clarified The Bulletin's story, providing an explanation that the Cambodian authorities were already investigating Vuong and asked for information from the AFP who cooperated in accordance with Australian guidelines. Furthermore, the AFP were unable to act on the advice provide by Vuong's mother as Vuong had already left the country when the advice was received.

Vuong is detained in Cambodia's Prey Sar prison, which is about 20 km from Phnom Penh. He claims he was blackmailed by the older men, who threatened his family and took his passport.

A prisoner exchange agreement between Australia and Cambodia was signed in October 2005, which may result in Vuong's eventual repatriation to Australia.

== See also ==
- List of Australians imprisoned or executed abroad
