= Michael McAuliffe (drug trafficker) =

Australian drug trafficker

- Born: Queensland, Australia
- Died: 19 June 1993; Kajang Prison, Selangor, Malaysia
- Occupations: Bartender, Army reservist
- Conviction: Drug trafficking
- Penalty: Death

Michael Denis McAuliffe was a barman from Sydney, born in Queensland, Australia, who was executed in Malaysia in June 1993 for heroin trafficking.

== Biography ==
McAuliffe was arrested at Penang International Airport at about 6.20 pm on 29 June 1985 when white powder packed in 14 condoms in his money belt and secured around his waist was detected during a body search at the airport inspection area. McAuliffe was charged with possession of 141.89 grams of heroin. The former army reserve soldier, who had been living in Manly, Sydney, was convicted in the Malaysian High Court in Penang on 17 August 1991. An appeal was lodged with the Malaysian Supreme Court. Karpal Singh acted as McAuliffe's counsel at the appeal, at which 28 arguments were presented.

One argument was that the original trial judge had criticised McAuliffe for failing to disclose his defense after his arrest. (This defense was that McAuliffe believed he was carrying "bang bang powder", an aphrodisiac given to him by a Thai dance hostess.) Karpal argued that the original judge's criticism had drawn an adverse inference of guilt on McAuliffe. The appeal court heard that what the original judge did was point out that McAuliffe had failed to disclose this defence of carrying an aphrodisiac to the officer who recorded a statement from him after his arrest. It was found that the judge had not drawn an inference of guilt from this. The appeal was rejected 13 May 1992. McAuliffe's family asked Malaysian authorities and the Australian government not to publicise his case.

McAuliffe was executed in Kajang Prison in Kajang, Selangor, in the Kuala Lumpur metropolitan area.

== See also ==
- List of Australians imprisoned or executed abroad
- Ronald Ryan
- Van Tuong Nguyen
