= Bon Levi =

Australian confidence trickster (born 1943)

Bon Levi (born 1943) is an Australian confidence trickster. Before he changed his name, he was Ronald Frederick. He is also known as Ron the Con, Roddy Farrow, Ron Heelan, Brett Wyatt, Ronald White and John McCorry.

His businesses have included Quik Holdings Pty Ltd, Quik Power Ltd, Bon Levi Designer Merchandising, Auction Wholesalers, Randy Man Life 02, Sprintline, Bon Levi Cosmetics, Crazy Joe Tire and Mechanical, Eagle Trailers, Fredericks Taskmaster, Target Magazine, Dial-A-Chicken Australia, MGM Model Management and Talent Scout, Jupiters Mechanical, Gold Coast Cameras Pty Ltd, Midas Photographics, Midas Photographics USA Inc.

Bon Levi has more than 50 convictions for fraud, stealing, breaking and entering, aggravated assault, unlawful common assault and false pretences. He offers his clients a stake in franchise businesses typically for tens of thousands of dollars. His enterprises have included light trailer manufacturing, escort agencies, auto wreckers, transport companies, crash repairers, catering companies, and disposable camera suppliers.

Bon Levi left Australia and entered the United States around 1997 and set up offices across the country. According to an FBI affidavit, Levi established two businesses in the US: Midas Photographic's USA Inc, a disposable camera franchise operation. Levi had 50 commissioned employees, a headquarters in Florida, and branch offices in Las Vegas; Chicago; Clear Water; Bloomington; Ann Arbor, Michigan; Dallas; Cincinnati; and Denver staffed with employees trying to sell his camera franchises.

In later court proceedings, the FBI alleged that 50 licensees paid between $30,000 and $68,000 and were promised income of between $500 and $2000 per week to run franchises for these businesses. The FBI said it had uncovered over $1 million of deposits in an account controlled by Levi at a St Louis bank.

After spending 37 months in jail in the United States, Levi returned to Australia and resumed his franchise operations. In the early 2000s he promoted franchises under the Little Joe and Joey's brand names. He later moved back to his original home state of Western Australia and has been named as a figure behind massage businesses in Perth. Legal action was launched against Bon Levi and his partner Colin Burton for allegedly misleading advertising in respect of employment and breaches of business registration laws. On 1 September 2010, Levi pleaded guilty in the Magistrates Court of Western Australia to charges of misleading employees and operating under unregistered business names, and was fined AUD17,000.
