= Stephen John Sutton =

Australian man (born 1964)

Stephen John Sutton (born 1964) is a man who was imprisoned in Argentina. He was arrested on 4 February 2003 after a joint operation by the Australian Federal Police and Argentine Police. He was charged with narcotics offences and was sentenced in 2005 to 11 years in jail for drug trafficking. He was released November 2008. He was featured in the 13 July 2011 episode of Locked Up Abroad (titled as Banged Up Abroad in the UK).

Sutton was last seen by his family in Sydney, Australia. At the time, he was living by himself and working in a Sydney factory. It is believed that he had met a Peruvian woman at his place of employment. He contacted his sister by mail, informed her that he had travelled to Peru with the woman, was living with the family and that the family was treating him wellAustralia–Colombia relations

Sutton and his family members maintain his innocence, as he claims that he was asked to courier "a quantity of gold" from Peru to Argentina. He also claims that when arrested, he had no drugs in his possession. The Sutton family is campaigning for his early release and improved support from the Australian Department of Foreign Affairs and Trade (DFAT), who they maintain have provided inadequate health care and legal advice to Sutton and insufficient information to the family. They have also criticised the Australian Government for not making attempts to have him returned to Australia, comparing his case to that of Schapelle Corby.

== See also ==
- List of Australians in international prisons
