= Australian Airlines =

Australian airline (2002–2006)

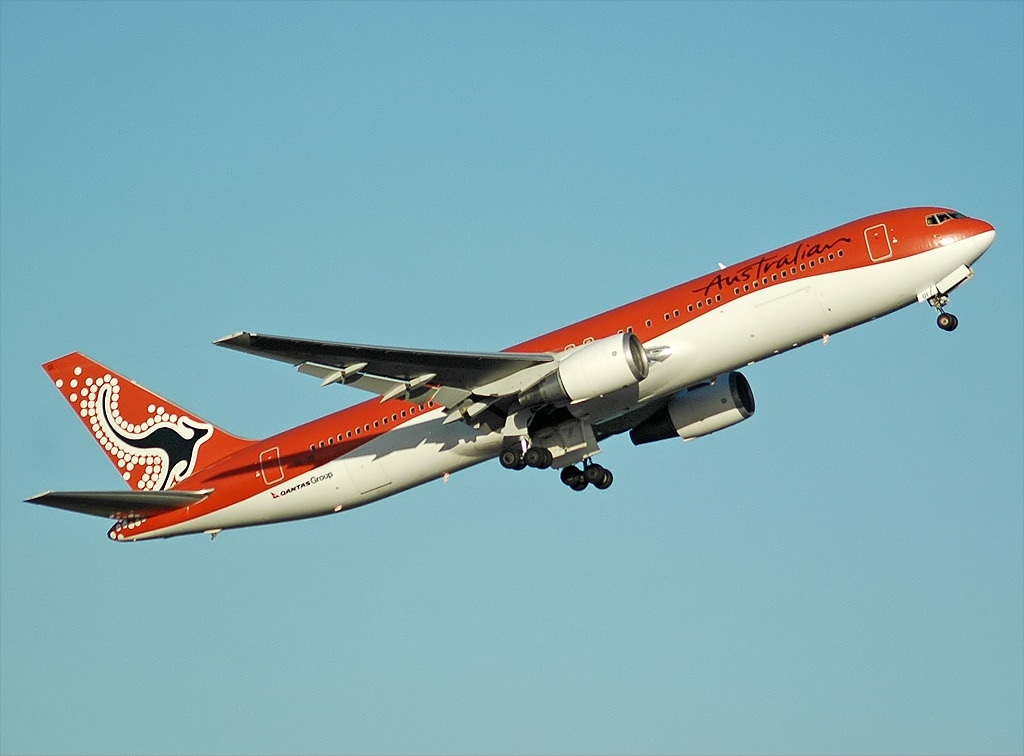
- Boeing 767-300ER in July 2004
IATA	ICAO	Call sign
AO	AUZ	AUSTRALIAN
- Commenced operations: 27 October 2002
- Ceased operations: 30 June 2006
- Hubs: Cairns
- Secondary hubs: Sydney
- Frequent-flyer program: Qantas Frequent Flyer
- Fleet size: 5
- Destinations: 15
- Headquarters: Sydney, New South Wales, Australia

Australian Airlines was an Australian airline that commenced operations in October 2002 serving Australian and Asian destinations. An all-economy, full-service international leisure carrier, it was a subsidiary of Qantas. Its main hub was at Cairns Airport, with a secondary hub at Sydney Airport. It ceased in June 2006 when the brand retired.

== History ==
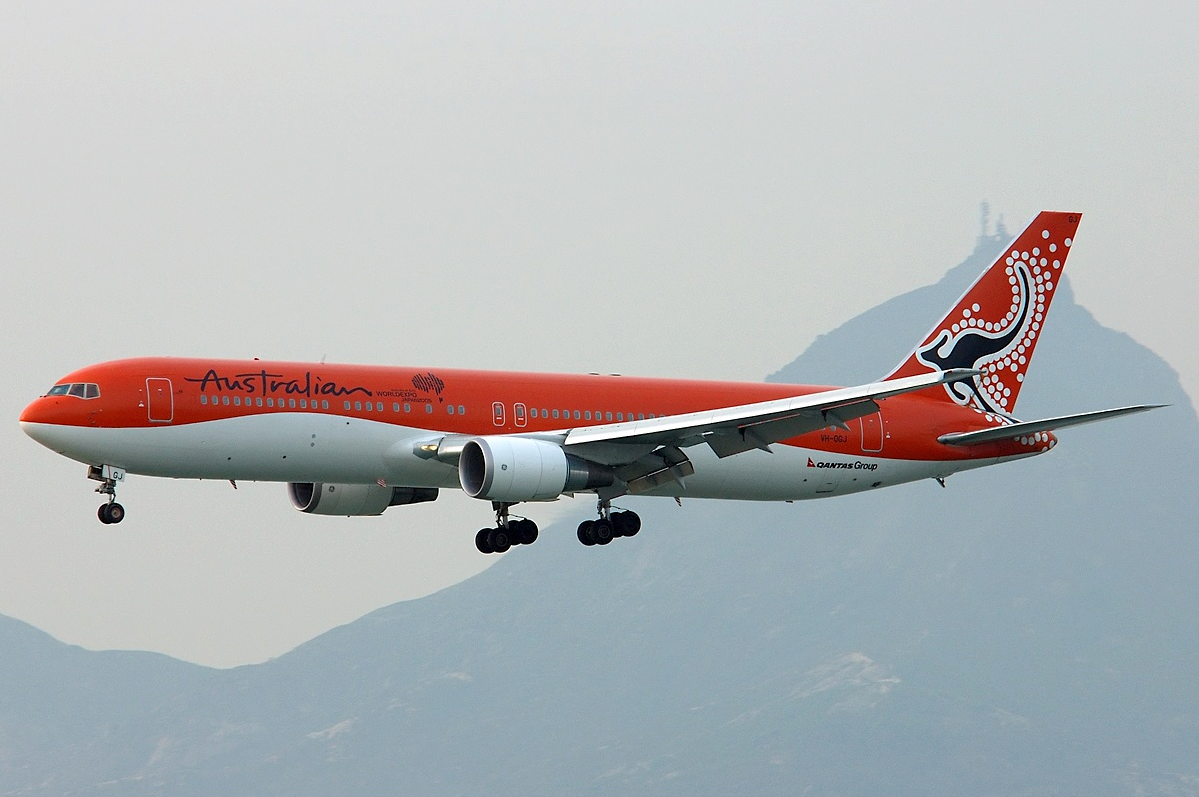
Boeing 767-300ER at Hong Kong International Airport in April 2005

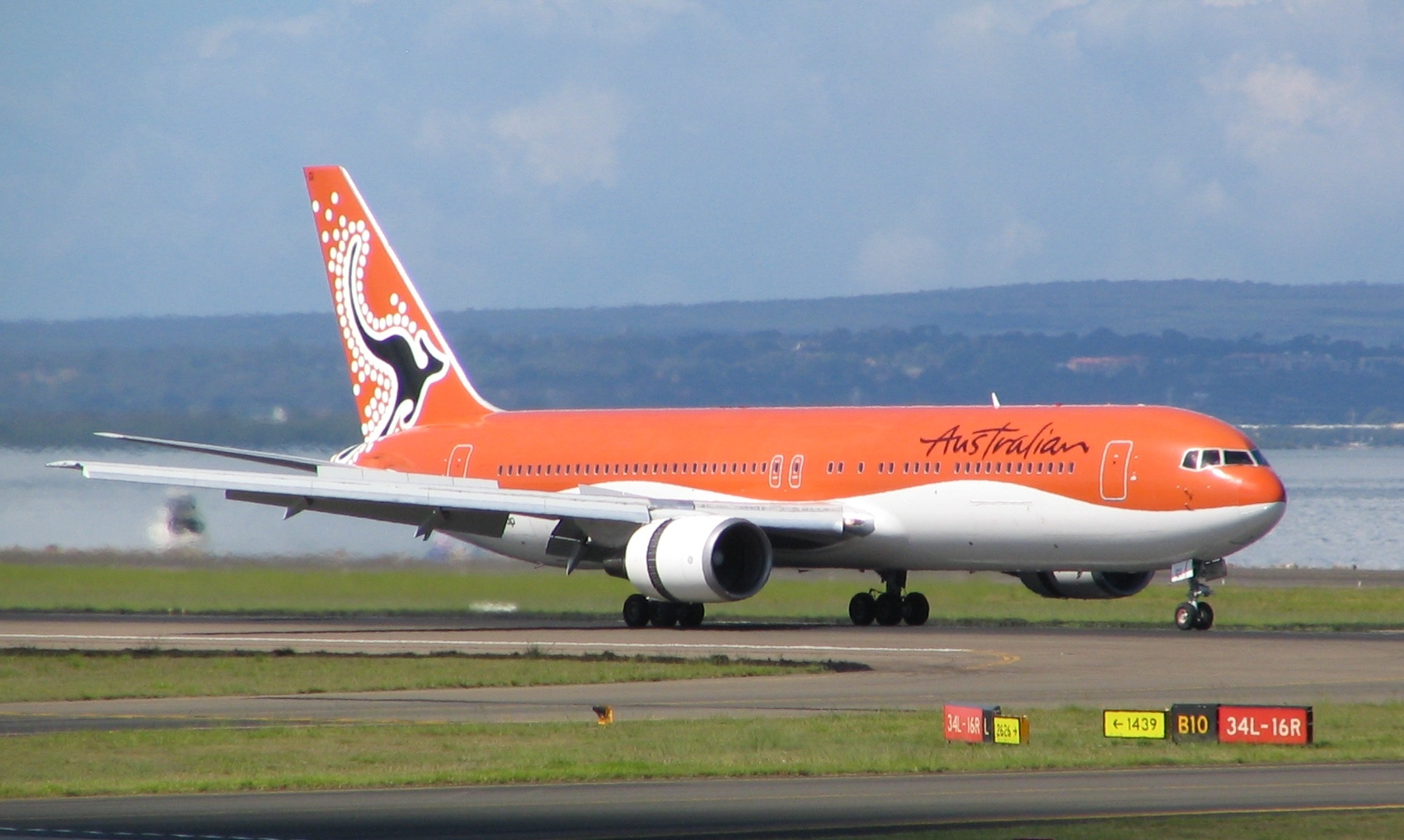
Boeing 767-300ER at Sydney Airport in November 2005

In August 2001, Qantas announced it would establish a low cost airline with a cost base 25-30% lower to operate on routes that were unprofitable. The name was a revival of the Australian Airlines brand that Qantas had acquired in September 1992 when it merged with Australian Airlines.

It commenced operations on 27 October 2002 with four former Qantas Boeing 767-300ERs that were reconfigured with 271 economy seats on flights from Cairns to Fukuoka, Hong Kong, Nagoya, Singapore and Taipei. In 2003, a further two 767-300ERs were added for the commencement of flights from Sydney and Melbourne to Denpasar.

In June 2006 the Australian Airlines brand was retired. The airline's aircraft were refitted with business class seating and repainted back into Qantas livery.

== Destinations ==
Australian Airlines operated scheduled services to the following destinations:

- Australia
  - Cairns – Cairns Airport (Main hub)
  - Darwin – Darwin International Airport
  - Gold Coast – Gold Coast Airport
  - Melbourne – Melbourne Airport
  - Perth – Perth Airport
  - Sydney – Sydney Airport (Secondary hub)
- Hong Kong
  - Hong Kong International Airport
- Indonesia
  - Denpasar, Bali – Ngurah Rai International Airport
- Japan
  - Fukuoka – Fukuoka Airport
  - Nagoya – Chubu Centrair International Airport
  - Osaka – Kansai International Airport
  - Sapporo – New Chitose Airport
- Malaysia
  - Kota Kinabalu – Kota Kinabalu International Airport^{[Note 1]}
- Singapore
  - Changi Airport
- Taiwan
  - Taipei – Taiwan Taoyuan International Airport^{[Note 1]}

^{Note 1} Suspended prior to ceasing operations

== Fleet ==
When operations ceased in June 2006, Australian Airlines operated five Boeing 767-300ERs.
