= Bilateral treaty =

Treaty between two state entities

A bilateral treaty (also called a bipartite treaty) is a treaty strictly between two subjects of public international law, generally either sovereign states or international organisations established by treaty. It is an agreement made by negotiations between two parties, established in writing and signed by representatives of the parties. Treaties can span in substance and complexity, regarding a wide variety of matters, such as territorial boundaries, trade and commerce, political alliances, and more. The agreement is usually then ratified by the lawmaking authority of each party or organization. Any agreement with more than two parties is a multilateral treaty. Similar to a contract, it is also called a contractual treaty. As with any other treaty, it is a written agreement that is typically formal and binding in nature.

== Involved Parties ==
These two parties can be two nations, or two international organizations, or one nation and one international organization. It is possible for a bilateral treaty to involve more than two parties; for example, each of the bilateral treaties between Switzerland and the European Union (EU) has seventeen parties. The parties are divided into two groups, the Swiss ("on the one part") and the EU and its member states ("on the other part"). The treaty establishes rights and obligations between the Swiss and the EU and the member states severally—it does not establish any rights and obligations amongst the EU and its member states.

When the two parties in a bilateral treaty are two countries bound in an international agreement, they are generally referred to as "state parties". The nature of an agreement between two state parties is subject to rules dictated by the Vienna Convention on the Law of Treaties. An agreement between a state or organization and an international organization is subjected to the rules defined by the Vienna Convention on the Law of Treaties between States and International Organizations or between International Organizations.

== Treaty Form and Agreement ==
=== Enter into Force ===
An agreement between two parties can enter into force in two ways. The first is when both parties have met specified terms for entry in the agreement. The second way in which a treaty enters into force is when both parties decide to be mutually bound to the agreement as of a certain date. Bilateral treaties usually become active and enforced by the second option when both parties agree to uphold the agreement starting on a predetermined date.

=== Modern form ===
Most treaties follow a fairly consistent format ever since the late 19th century. A typical treaty begins with a preamble, then followed by the numbered articles which contains the substance of the agreement, and concludes with a closing protocol.

The preamble typically names and describes the involved parties and what their shared objectives for the treaty are. It may also some context or summarize any underlying events that caused for the agreement to come about. A boilerplate of who the representatives are, and how they have communicated, i.e. a summary of how and why the representatives have the authority to negotiate for their respective party.

The start of the actual agreed upon terms is usually signaled by the words "have agreed as follows". The numbered articles make up the body of the treaty, divided into article headings which are typically a paragraph long. In most treaties, the articles at the end of this section will clarify how peacefully resolve disputes over the interpretations.

== Examples ==
Note that it is not the name (an Accord, a Pact, a Convention, etc.), but the contents of an agreement between two parties that forms a bilateral treaty. Examples include the Camp David Accords between Egypt and Israel signed in September 1978 which does not have the term 'treaty' in the name.

== See also ==
- Bilateral investment treaty
- Treaty of Friendship
- International law
- Law of treaties
- Multilateral treaty
- Switzerland and the European Union
