= Mick Keelty =

Australian police chief

Mick Keelty APM
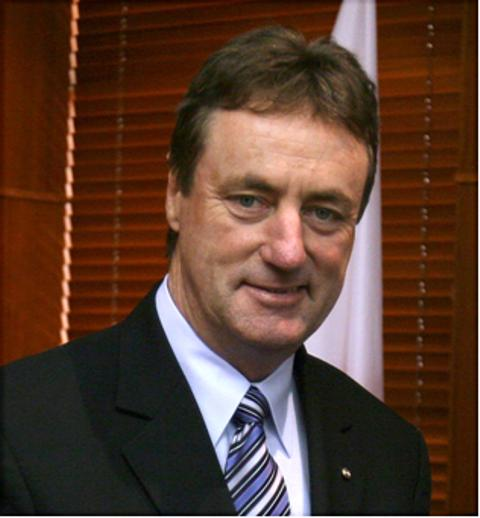
- Keelty in July 2014

Commissioner of the Australian Federal Police
- In office 2 April 2001 – 2 September 2009
- Preceded by: Mick Palmer
- Succeeded by: Tony Negus

Personal details
- Born: 13 July 1954 (age 72) Sydney, Australia
- Profession: Consultant

Michael Joseph Keelty APM (born 13 July 1954) is a retired Australian Police Commissioner of the Australian Federal Police from 2001 to 2009. He was also the inaugural chairperson of the Australian Crime Commission, now known as the Australian Criminal Intelligence Commission.

== Policing career ==
Keelty joined the Australian Capital Territory Police in 1974, which was subsequently merged with the Commonwealth Police in 1979, to create the Australian Federal Police (AFP). He became an Assistant Commissioner of the AFP in 1995 and Deputy Commissioner in 1998. Keelty was appointed Commissioner of Police of the Australian Federal Police on 2 April 2001 for an initial term of five years. He was the first Commissioner appointed from the ranks of the AFP.

Seconded to the then National Crime Authority, Keelty led the investigation into the then head of the South Australia Police Drug Squad Barry Malcolm Moyse. Keelty remained at the NCA and led the investigation into Sydney underworld figure Lenny McPherson which saw Keelty embroiled into what became known as the Lauer/Pickering affair ultimately leading to the resignation of both the then NSW Police Minister and NSW Commissioner. The McPherson investigation uncovered significant corruption in the NSW Police partly responsible for initiating the Wood Royal Commission.

Keelty returned to the AFP and was later taken off line to work with the Commonwealth Attorney General's Department with then barrister now NSW Justice Ian Harrison SC. Keelty returned to the AFP and became the Assistant Commissioner Crime which also oversaw an expansion of the AFP's international presence to 26 countries and 32 cities around the world. It is in this role that Keelty's international reputation grew as the AFP was drawn into United Nations and transnational crime fighting roles.

As Commissioner, Keelty oversaw the expansion of the AFP following the September 11 attacks in the United States of America later that year, with further expansion after the 2002 Bali bombings. The organisation quadrupled in size and budget in the eight-and-a-half years he served as Commissioner, taking on new roles such as the International Deployment Group – a body of some 1,200 officers serving in Afghanistan, Timor Leste, the Solomon Islands and Papua New Guinea and expanding the AFP's budget from A$370 million in 2001 to A$1.3 billion in 2009.

Major controversies in the AFP during his tenure included the investigation of Muhamed Haneef, an Indian-born doctor, on suspicion of involvement in the 2007 Glasgow International Airport attack, that saw a protracted investigation and release without charge, with later substantial compensation for loss of income, interruption of his professional work, and emotional distress largely based on the actions of the AFP. Keelty also oversaw the AFP's involvement in the Bali Nine case, in which nine Australians were known to be carrying drugs to Indonesia, where they were arrested and jailed, with two later executed. The AFP never confirmed whether they had notified the Indonesian authorities, but said they were unable to arrest the nine before departure from Australia. Keelty has defended the AFP's role in the Bali Nine saga.

Keelty retired on 2 September 2009, on the 35th anniversary of commencing as a police officer having been instrumental in building the National Police Memorial located in Canberra. Keelty rebuilt the Australian Institute of Police Management located at North Head, Manly NSW. Along with his Indonesian counterpart, General Dai'Bactier, Keelty built an international counter-terrorism training college at Semarang, Indonesia. While Commissioner, Keelty acquired 200 hectares of land at Majura ACT for future use as a UN-approved international training centre for Australian police serving overseas which also houses the AFP forensic science centre.

== Career after policing ==
Since his retirement from the AFP, Keelty has become an Adjunct Professor at both the Australian National University and Charles Sturt University, undertaking research into policy implications of social networking for covert operations by police and security agencies. He is a member of the International Advisory Board for the Australian Research Council Centre for Excellence in Policing and Security and a member of the World Economic Forum's Global Council on Organised Crime. In February 2011, Keelty was appointed by the WA Government to lead the independent inquiry into the Perth Hills bushfires. Keelty later conducted a review of the Margaret River WA bushfires.

In 2013, Keelty reviewed the Queensland Police, Corrections and Emergency Services portfolio for the Queensland Government and was appointed a part-time Corruption Commissioner on the QLD Crime and Corruption Commission following a review by former High Court Justice the Hon. Ian Callinan AC QC and Queensland University law academic Nicholas Aroney. Keelty was a member of the ARC funded Centre for Applied Philosophy and Public Ethics from 2014-2016 chaired by former High Court Justice the Hon. Michael Kirby AC CMG.

In 2013/14, Keelty was also asked to review the 2013 WA Senate Election which resulted in that state having to return to the polls following anomalies uncovered by Keelty.

From 2016–2017, Keelty conducted a classified review of the security of the Australian Defence Force following terrorist attacks on military bases overseas. In July 2017, Keelty was appointed the Chair of an expert advisory group in the Department of Prime Minister and Cabinet involved with the protection of children and young persons.

Following the bushfires in Bega Valley of NSW, the NSW Government appointed Keelty to review the interoperability of the NSW Emergency Services portfolio. Keelty was appointed by the Federal Minister for Agriculture the Hon. David Littleproud MP to examine the governance arrangements of the Northern Basin of the Murray-Darling delivering a report in December 2019.

On 1 August 2019, it was announced that a new position of Inspector-General for the Murray Darling Basin would be created and that from 1 October 2019, Keelty would act as the Interim Inspector-General as a non-statutory role for a period of 12 months, or until a statutory appointment is made. In March 2020, Keelty delivered a report of the impact of lower flows on state shares under the Murray-Darling Basin agreement.

In January 2020, the South Australian Premier, Steven Marshall announced that Keelty would review the response to the 2019/2020 devastating bushfires that impacted Kangaroo Island and the Adelaide Hills.

Keelty has performed Chairman and Company Director roles on a number of private sector and charitable boards.

On 16 August 2020, the media reported that Keelty compromised an AFP investigation into alleged Australian war crimes in Afghanistan. Keelty was reported to have informed Ben Roberts-Smith in June 2018 that he was a figure of interest to police. Keelty said he contacted Roberts-Smith because he was asked to do so by a security adviser who previously worked for media billionaire Kerry Stokes, who is Roberts-Smith’s employer at the Seven Network. Keelty has stated that he made this approach out of concern for Roberts-Smith's welfare. The media has reported many complaints from SAS soldiers (both former and current serving) that Roberts-Smith had allegedly participated in the execution of prisoners. The court heard that Roberts-Smith obtained burner phones and began using encrypted communication apps on them about two weeks after receiving the information from Keelty. Besanko found Roberts-Smith lied when he denied knowing about the referrals before buying the phones. He also found he lied about trying to evade police detection. The authors of the media articles are being sued for defamation.

== Honours and awards ==
Officer of the Order of Australia (AO)	13 June 2011, "For distinguished service to national and international law enforcement, particularly through the establishment of bilateral agreements with corresponding overseas agencies and the integration of intelligence and law enforcement efforts within Australia". He resigned from the Order in December 2023.
Australian Police Medal (APM)	1996 "For distinguished police service".
Bintang Bhayangkara Utama	2003, Indonesia's National Police Meritorious Service Star (First Class).
Knight Grand Cross (First Class) The Most Noble Order of the Crown of Thailand	2011, Thailand "for assistance to the Royal Thai Police on transnational crime and terrorism".
Darjah Utama Bakti Cemerlang	2008, Singapore's Distinguished Service Order (civilian)
Centenary Medal	2001
National Medal with Rosette	1991 and 1999. For 25–34 years of service.

Keelty's academic qualifications include a Master of Public Policy and Administration and a Graduate Certificate in Criminal Justice Education from the University of Virginia, USA; he is a graduate of the FBI National Academy, and is a Fellow of the Australian Institute of Management.

== See also ==
- Law enforcement in Australia

Police appointments
Preceded by Mick Palmer	Commissioner of the Australian Federal Police; 2001–2009	Succeeded by Tony Negus
