= Mary Jane Veloso drug smuggling case =

Filipino woman released from death row in Indonesia

Mary Jane Veloso
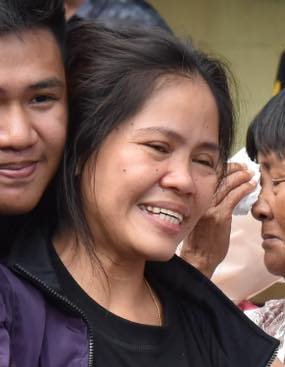
- Veloso on the day of her repatriation in 2024
- Born: Mary Jane Fiesta Veloso; January 10, 1985 (age 41); Cabanatuan, Nueva Ecija, Philippines
- Occupation: Domestic worker
- Status: Released on September 25, 2026
- Conviction: Drug trafficking (2010)
- Penalty: Death; automatically commuted to reclusion perpetua due to abolition of capital punishment in Philippines (2024)

Details
- Imprisoned at: Correctional Institution for Women, Mandaluyong, Metro Manila (formerly)

Mary Jane Fiesta Veloso (born January 10, 1985) is a Filipino domestic worker who was arrested in Indonesia for drug trafficking in 2010 and then sentenced to death after being found guilty at trial. Granted a temporary reprieve in 2015, she remained on death row for almost 10 years afterwards. Throughout her 14 years of incarceration, Veloso vehemently protested her innocence and claimed that she was tricked into smuggling narcotics. In November 2024, the Indonesian government announced that Veloso would be transferred home to the Philippines after an agreement was reached between the two countries on prisoner transfer laws. Veloso was finally released from prison and repatriated to Manila in mid-December 2024. Her case, among others, aroused international attention and widespread scrutiny of Indonesia's capital punishment and drug prohibition laws. She was granted an absolute pardon by President Bongbong Marcos in September 2026.

== Biography ==
Veloso was born in Cabanatuan, Nueva Ecija, where she was the youngest of five siblings of a family who lived in extreme poverty. Her father worked as a seasonal agricultural worker on sugar cane plantations of the José Cojuangco-owned Hacienda Luisita, while also selling plastic-ware out of a pushcart and collecting discarded bottles and plastic to sell to junk shops. Veloso dropped out in her first year of high school. and married her husband when she was around 17 years old, however they later separated resulting in her becoming a single mother to two young sons. To help provide for her family, Veloso emigrated to Dubai in 2009 to work as a household service worker, however she soon returned to the Philippines before the end of her two-year contract after an attempted rape by her employer.

== Background to arrest ==
In April 2010, Veloso was recruited by Maria Kristina Sergio to be employed as a domestic servant in Malaysia. To cover administrative costs, Veloso paid Sergio ₱20,000 in cash as well as giving her a motorcycle and her cell phone. On arrival in Kuala Lumpur, Sergio told Veloso that the job was no longer available, however she had arranged similar employment in Indonesia for her instead, so Veloso stayed at the Sun Inn Lagoon Hotel in Bandar Sunway while waiting for her next flight a few days later. As Veloso had arrived in Malaysia with only 2 pairs of jeans and a couple of tee shirts, Sergio took her shopping at the nearby Sunway Pyramid for new clothes to wear. Realizing all of the additional items would not fit into her small backpack, Sergio gave her a new empty suitcase to pack her things into. Sergio then introduced Veloso to a Malaysian based African man named 'Ike', who gave her an Air Asia plane ticket and a cell phone number to call once she landed in Indonesia.

== Imprisonment in Indonesia ==
=== Arrest at Yogyakarta airport ===
On April 25, 2010, Veloso arrived at Adisucipto International Airport in Yogyakarta. Airport officials scanning Veloso's luggage in the X-ray machine were alerted to unusual objects and ordered her bag to be fully searched. After finding nothing illegal amongst her possessions, the now empty suitcase was again scanned, and the customs officers confirmed they had detected suspicious items within it. After dismantling Veloso's suitcase, the officers discovered 2.6 kilograms (5.7 lb) of heroin hidden in the inner lining (worth an estimated US$500,000), which had been wrapped in aluminum foil and black plastic in an effort to avoid discovery. After her arrest, Mary Jane was provided with neither legal advice nor an interpreter or a Tagalog translator, even though the police interrogated her in Indonesian (a language she did not understand).

After learning of Mary Jane's arrest, and getting details of the events that led to it while speaking to her via a phone call from an Indonesian prison, Veloso's relatives travelled to Talavera to confront Maria Kristina Sergio. They were warned not to contact the authorities or speak to the local media, as the international drug trafficking organization Sergio claimed to be a member of would take revenge on both Mary Jane and the rest of the Veloso family too if they exposed their activities. Disregarding the warning, the Veloso family travelled to Manila in August 2010 to inform the Department of Foreign Affairs (DFA) of Mary Jane's plight. They also attempted to file a criminal case against Sergio with the National Bureau of Investigation, however they were informed they could not lodge a complaint due to a lack of evidence.

=== Trial and verdict ===
On October 4, 2010, Veloso's trial began in Yogyakarta's Sleman District Court. Throughout her trial, she maintained her innocence, claiming that she was duped into carrying the suitcase by her recruiter, a godsister of hers named Maria Kristina Sergio, who convinced her to travel to Indonesia after failing to get a job in Malaysia.

Veloso was represented during her trial by a state-funded attorney with little experience in capital cases, and her court-appointed interpreter was an unlicensed student who translated proceedings from Indonesian into English, a language which Mary Jane had only a limited proficiency in. The result of these errors was that throughout her trial, Veloso had no meaningful understanding of the legal proceedings and could not communicate effectively with her lawyer, the court officials, or the trial judge. An appellate lawyer would later remark that a pivotal moment occurred when the trial judge asked Veloso in Indonesian if she regretted trafficking heroin into the country from Malaysia. As she didn't speak the language, Mary Jane didn't understand the question, and struggling for an answer under pressure, she eventually replied "No".

On October 11, 2010, Veloso was found guilty as charged, with the court ruling "the accused could not prove the truth of her unawareness in court, so the accused's denial cannot legally be used as a reason to free her of criminal responsibility”, adding that her denial of guilt was an aggravating factor. Despite public prosecutor Sri Anggraeni recommending life imprisonment as punishment, Veloso was sentenced to death by the presiding judge. When the court's sentence against her was read out in Indonesian and then translated into English, Veloso did not understand its meaning. It was only later that she realized she had received the death penalty after a priest explained it to her.

However, due to a moratorium on capital punishment enacted by Indonesian President Susilo Bambang Yudhoyono, Veloso's execution was put on indefinite hold. After the 2014 election of Joko Widodo as President of Indonesia, the death penalty became active again as a judicial punishment. On March 24, 2015, the Supreme Court of Indonesia rejected Veloso's final appeal and ordered that preparations for her execution to proceed.

=== Lead up to scheduled execution ===
On April 25, 2015, during a death row visit by her family and officials from the Philippine's Department of Foreign Affairs, Veloso handed over four handwritten letters addressed to Philippine President Benigno Aquino III, the youth and women of the Philippines, and to those she held responsible for what happened to her. The letters pleaded with the President to help spare her from the death penalty for the sake of her children, while also warning Filipino youth and women not to be fooled by illegal recruiters. To the people who she believes set her up, Veloso said they would have a guilty conscience for the rest of their lives unless they came forward to save her, while also stating that she prayed God would forgive them for all the evil they had committed.

"For the people who ruined my life: I would like to convey to them that their hearts will be troubled by the evil they have done and they will stop their bad jobs so that no one will be harmed like me and no one will become a victim of illegal work in another country. You know that I am innocent and I will be hanged for a sin I did not commit, even if the execution continues with me I know that the Lord God does not sleep and He will give me equality for everything that happened to me. I hope your minds will be clear and you will feel sorry, I hope the person who ruined my life will be caught as soon as possible and that no one will be a victim like me. For me, it is very painful and very difficult to accept that it is necessary to go through all this because of people like you who do bad things. But even though it was so bad that you did to me, I still always pray to you Lord God and ask for forgiveness for all the sins and evil you have done. It's not too late for a change, don't get too involved, there's still a future waiting for you if you come forward and ask for forgiveness from everyone you've sinned against. Trust in God"

— Letter from death row by Mary Jane Veloso addressed to those she held responsible for her arrest and death sentence

Veloso was scheduled to be executed on the maximum security prison island of Nusa Kambangan together with the Bali Nine duo from Australia, Andrew Chan and Myuran Sukumaran; Brazilian Rodrigo Gularte; an Indonesian; and four Nigerians at 1:00 AM WIB (2:00 AM PHT) on April 29, 2015.

On the morning of April 28, 2015, Maria Kristina Sergio unexpectedly surrendered to Philippine police in Nueva Ecija, claiming to have received death threats through online social media and via text message, saying that if Veloso was executed as scheduled, she herself would be murdered in revenge. Sergio was about to be indicted by the National Bureau of Investigation on charges of illegal recruitment, human trafficking, and estafa in relation to Veloso's case and claimed she turned herself in to prove her innocence of all the accusations against her.

A few hours later, Veloso had a final visit with her family and two sons (aged 12 and 6) in the death row visiting room of Nusa Kambangan prison. Speaking to her eldest son, she told him "Don't think that I died because I did something wrong. Be proud of your mother because she died owning up to the sins of others". When she was told that visiting time had ended and she had to say goodbye to her sons for the last time, Veloso broke down with emotion, saying: "Will I not get longer with my children? They'll never see me again, I'll never see them again!”. The prison guards in the room reportedly found the scene so heart wrenching they all broke down into tears.

=== Stay of execution ===
Sergio's surrender prompted Philippine President Aquino to appeal for clemency on the basis that her testimony could be invaluable in prosecuting her alleged recruiter. Aquino went as far as to break diplomatic protocol by directly making a phone call to Indonesian foreign minister Retno Marsudi using a burner phone on the sidelines of the ASEAN summit in Malaysia hours before Veloso's scheduled execution. Philippine authorities then invoked the ASEAN Mutual Legal Assistance Treaty (MLAT), obliging Indonesia to offer Veloso as a state witness in the ensuing human trafficking case, as Veloso's alleged trafficker Maria Kristina Sergio, along with Sergio's live-in partner Julius Lacanilao and an African national tentatively identified as "Ike", would face charges of human trafficking, illegal recruiting and estafa (fraud).

At around 10 pm, after the condemned prisoners had been locked in their cells for the final time to speak with their religious advisers, Indonesian police officers entered Veloso's cell to announce her execution had been called off, and then escorted her off the island back to Yogyakarta. Just after 11 pm, the other eight condemned prisoners were driven one by one to the execution site and simultaneously put to death as scheduled by firing squad at approximately 12:35 am.

President Aquino's spokesman Herminio Coloma Jr. released a statement soon after saying: “We would like to acknowledge their sense of fairness in assessing new information we provided and their understanding that Mary Jane Veloso is a person who went to their country in search of a better life, better opportunity, but was taken advantaged of by criminal syndicates”.

News of Veloso's reprieve came so close to the scheduled time of her execution that several news outlets reported preemptively that it had occurred. The front-page headline on the Philippine Daily Inquirer newspaper read "Death Came Before Dawn", while Manila-based tabloid Abante printed a front page picture of Veloso along with a headline in capitals that translated as: “Farewell, Mary Jane”. Veloso's mother was quoted as believing her daughter was spared by "a miracle". However, Joko Widodo insisted that Veloso's execution is postponed, not cancelled.

At a May 27, 2015, joint hearing of the Philippine House Committee on Dangerous Drugs in Manila, National Bureau of Investigation Director Virgilio Mendez announced that Veloso's two sons and their father would be immediately admitted into the Witness Protection Program, after unidentified armed men had been seen acting suspiciously near their home in Talavera, Nueva Ecija.

=== Incarceration on death row ===
In July 2015, Manny Pacquiao visited Veloso and prayed with her on the death row section of Wirogunan prison in Yogyakarta. He had previously written a letter to the President of Indonesia Joko Widodo begging for him to grant executive clemency to Veloso on the eve of her scheduled execution a few months prior. Pacquiao also visited the Indonesian Parliament in Jakarta to discuss Veloso's case and to thank the Indonesian government for the postponement of her execution while legal proceedings were ongoing in the Philippines.

According to The Jakarta Post, on September 12, 2016, Indonesia President Widodo reported that Philippine President Rodrigo Duterte had authorized Veloso's execution. However, on the same day, Philippine Agriculture Secretary Manny Piñol said in a Manila Bulletin article that Duterte had actually asked for clemency for Veloso.

On March 10, 2021, Veloso was moved from Wirogunan II A women's prison to Wonosari II B women's prison in Gunung Kidul Regency, Yogyakarta, where she continued to earn money to send for her family by making batik cloth, with each sheet selling for between 600.000 and several million rupiah.

In February 2023, during a visit by a women's aid NGO to Wonosari Prison, Veloso handed over two handwritten letters addressed to the governments of the Philippines and Indonesia, which contained appeals for clemency and a plea for the criminal trial against her illegal recruiter, Maria Kristina Sergio to proceed with urgency.

On June 12, 2023, Veloso's parents and two sons visited her in Wonosari Prison for the first time in four years. That same month Veloso was diagnosed as having a potentially malignant ovarian cyst, which prompted calls from both her mother and her lawyer Ryan Pinoa for a commutation of Veloso's sentence to life imprisonment on medical grounds, in the hope it would allow her to more effectively seek medical treatment for her health issues.

== Release from prison ==
=== Diplomatic efforts to secure release ===
In September 2022, during a state visit by Philippine President Bongbong Marcos to Indonesia, Philippine Foreign Secretary Enrique Manalo a request for “executive clemency” to be granted to Veloso during a meeting with Indonesian Foreign Minister Retno Marsudi in Jakarta. According to Philippine government sources, Foreign Minister Marsudi agreed to make enquiries to the Indonesian Ministry of Justice about Veloso's conviction.

During the May 2023 ASEAN Summit in Labuan Bajo, Marcos discussed Veloso's case with Indonesian President Joko Widodo and requested that the Indonesian government review the circumstances of her arrest and conviction. As well as clemency or a commutation of jail term, President Marcos Jr. also proposed the extradition of Veloso to serve the remainder of any sentence in the Philippines as an alternative option.

In January 2024, during an official three-day visit to Manila, Widodo assured Marcos that the Indonesian government would “re-examine” Veloso's conviction for trafficking heroin, with Marcos hoping that clemency would ultimately be granted to Veloso. Philippine Foreign Secretary Enrique Manalo had reiterated his government's long standing request for the granting of clemency to Indonesian Foreign Secretary Retno Marsudi at an earlier meeting at during the same diplomatic visit.

=== Release from prison & repatriation to the Philippines ===
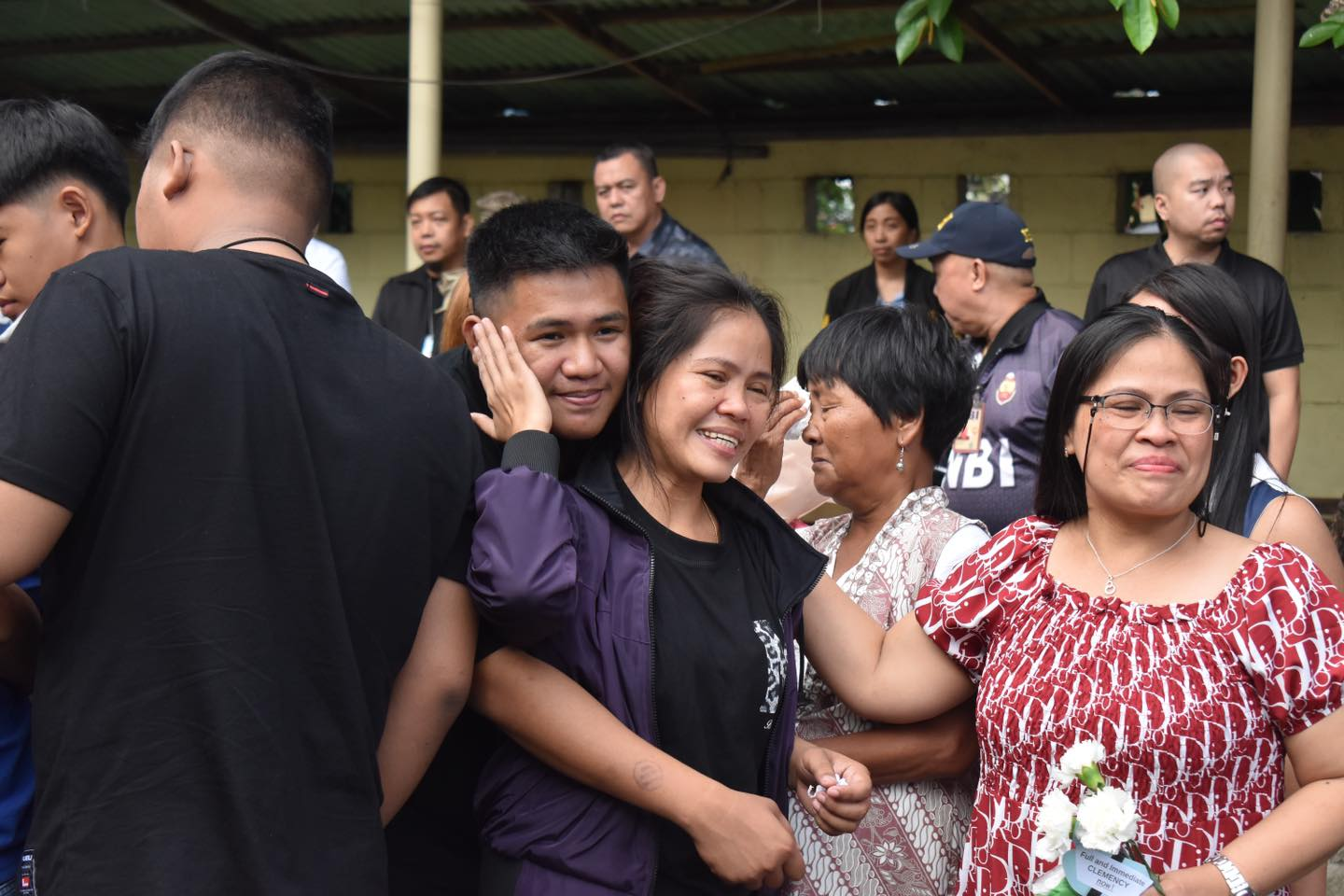
Veloso reunites with her family upon her arrival at the Correctional Institution for Women in Mandaluyong on December 18, 2024

In November 2024, the possibility of transfer of Veloso to a Philippine prison where she will serve her remaining sentence or receive pardon was being considered by the Government of Indonesia, as it was in the process of formulating a policy to resolve the issue of foreign prisoners in their country, either through bilateral negotiations or transfer of prisoner as part of constructive diplomacy. On November 20, 2024, Philippine president Bongbong Marcos announced that Veloso would soon return to the Philippines after more than a decade of diplomacy and consultations with the Indonesian government. Marcos also extended his gratitude to Indonesian President Prabowo Subianto and his government for their goodwill in releasing Veloso. Indonesian minister Yusril Ihza Mahendra released a statement that Veloso would be transferred in December 2024 to serve the rest of her sentence in the Philippines.

At a separate news conference, DFA official Eduardo Jose de Vega told that the ultimate goal was for the president to issue clemency after her transfer to the custody of Philippine authorities. De Vega cautioned that Veloso was unlikely to be immediately freed on her return, and that mutual agreement would be needed with the Indonesian government as to when clemency should be granted. Philippine Justice Assistant Secretary Mico Clavano added that in the eyes of the law that while the Philippines will have physical custody of her, Indonesia would still retain legal custody, and that while the Indonesian government had not requested anything in return for Veloso's release, they were not surrendering their jurisdiction over the case either. Clavano also said that while no decision on where she would be detained had yet been reached, the Correctional Institution for Women in the Manila suburb of Mandaluyong was one option being considered. Veloso herself released a statement expressing gratitude to all those who had worked to have her transferred to the Philippines, adding that she would use Indonesian cloth-dying techniques she learned in prison to earn money for her family on her return home.

On December 16, 2024, Indonesian Ministry of Immigration and Correction official Sohibur Rachman confirmed that Veloso had been transferred to Pondok Bambu prison in the Duren Sawit district of Jakarta in preparation for her repatriation, in the expectation that she would return to the Philippines a couple of days later via a Cebu Pacific flight departing around midnight from Soekarno-Hatta International Airport. On the morning of December 18, 2024, Veloso arrived at Ninoy Aquino International Airport in Manila, where she was immediately taken into custody by the Bureau of Corrections and transported to the Correctional Institution for Women. After processing by prison guards and undergoing a medical examination, Veloso was then granted a short visit with her family, where she was reunited with her parents and her two children. As capital punishment in the Philippines was abolished in 2006, Veloso's death sentence was automatically commuted to reclusión perpetua upon arrival, however the Department of Justice announced that an application for remission on her sentence or to grant full clemency would be seriously considered by the Philippine government.

=== Campaign to grant clemency ===
On July 4, 2025, Veloso’s relatives, along with civil society groups such as Churches Witnessing with Migrants, Migrante International, the United Church of Christ in the Philippines, and Caritas Philippines, marched to Malacañang Palace to submit a petition appealing for Mary Jane's immediate pardon and release from prison. The appeal, which was signed by more than 13,000 supporters, urged President Bongbong Marcos to grant clemency before his upcoming State of the Nation Address on July 28, 2025. Palace Press officer Claire Castro was later quoted as saying that the appeal would "likely receive a positive response". Veloso’s relatives again appealed for clemency in late October 2025 while submitting a petition to the Supreme Court of the Philippines asking for a request to speed up the trial process of Maria Kristina Sergio and Julius Lacanilao so as she could testify against them.

On the November 14, 2025, the National Union of People’s Lawyers (NUPL) submitted a petition for habeas corpus on Veloso’s behalf to the Supreme Court of the Philippines, arguing that there was no legal basis for her to remain in prison and demanding that the Philippine government substantiate the legality of her continued incarceration at the Correctional Institution for Women in Manila. Other legal arguments put forth in the 19 page petition included:

- Veloso is not currently subject to any Philippine National Police warrant or Philippine court order to hold her in custody
- Veloso has neither been charged with or convicted of any crime under Philippine criminal law, thus her continued confinement was demonstrably a violation of her legal rights under Article 3 of the Constitution of the Philippines
- only Indonesia could impose legal penalties against Veloso as the criminal offense she was convicted of was committed there
- Philippine authorities lacked the jurisdiction and domestic legal authority to enforce a foreign penal sentence
- the continuing enforcement of a foreign judgement on Philippine soil was a flagrant breach of both domestic and international law
- as there was no actual treaty between the Philippine and Indonesian governments regarding the transfer of sentenced persons, Veloso's repatriation was an ad hoc diplomatic arrangement rather than a prisoner transfer, therefore Philippine authorities were not legally bound to continue her prison sentence after her return
- as the Philippine government had officially designated Veloso as a human trafficking victim, her continued imprisonment was a clear violation of both the domestic Anti-Trafficking in Persons Act of 2003 and the international Palermo Protocol

On the December 16, 2025, a resolution was filed in the House of Representatives of the Philippines urging President Marcos Jr. to grant clemency to Veloso by Sarah Elago, stating that "granting clemency is not a disregard for the law, it is a humane measure clearly recognized by our Constitution".

In late January 2026, Veloso herself made an appeal for immediate release via an open letter to the Philippine authorities, highlighting the strain her continuing incarceration was having on her elderly parents and the fact she was missing out on her children growing up in her absence. At a February 2026 protest rally outside the Department of Justice on Padre Faura Street, Celia Veloso made a personal appeal to President Bongbong Marcos to grant clemency to her daughter. In response, Malacañang Palace Press Officer Undersecretary Claire Castro issued a statement that the Office of the Executive Secretary was currently reviewing the legal provisions of Veloso's transfer to Philippine custody from Indonesia, as well as the meeting notes of the government officials who presided over the transfer, with the results of the review then being presented to President Bongbong Marcos for a final decision. On May 8, 2026, Veloso's legal team formally filed a motion at the Supreme Court of the Philippines requesting they act on her previous petition for habeas corpus, again asserting that there was no legal basis for her continued incarceration according to the terms of her release from Indonesian custody.

=== Presidential pardon ===
(Above) President Bongbong Marcos remarks about the pardon
(Below) Presidential pardon document

Veloso speaking a day after her release

In late September 2026, Malacañang Palace Press Officer Claire Castro revealed that President Bongbong Marcos was "seriously considering" granting Veloso an absolute pardon on humanitarian grounds in the immediate future, while Congressman Albert Garcia was quoted as saying an announcement on granting Veloso clemency would be made in the next few days. On September 25, 2026, President Marcos confirmed that he had granted Veloso an absolute pardon the previous day, while Veloso was officially released around 5pm that evening from the Correctional Institution for Women in Mandaluyong Veloso would later recall how she was writing in her cell when the entire prison erupted in cheering as other inmates heard she had been granted a pardon.

Veloso departed the prison with her family shortly after midnight for a Malate district hotel, and after attending a thanksgiving Mass at the Siena College of Quezon City the following morning they finally travelled to their hometown of General Mamerto Natividad. After arriving at 5:45pm, Veloso enjoyed a meal of pinakbet and grilled bangus with her family before friends and neighbours arrived for a Karaoke session. The Veloso family received Php50,000 in financial supports from the Department of Social Welfare and Development upon her release, while the Department of Migrant Workers deployed a team to offer assistance to Velso while she rebuilt her life via psychosocial counseling and livelihood starter kits.

== Related legal cases in the Philippines ==
=== Sergio and Lacanilao criminal charges ===
On May 5, 2015, Bassit Sarip, Executive Officer of the N.B.I's Anti-human Trafficking Division, announced that Maria Kristina Sergio was under investigation in a case with the same modus operandi with Veloso, where a Filipina named Judy Tosi was promised employment as a maid in Thailand in 2010, however when she arrived there to meet Sergio she was then sent to Hong Kong instead. Sergio also gave Tosi luggage to bring on her trip, and when she arrived at Hong Kong International Airport Tosi was arrested for drug trafficking after 800 grams of heroin was discovered hidden inside the bag.

On May 7, 2015, the Philippines Department of Justice released a document created by the National Bureau of Investigation containing admissions by Maria Kristina Sergio that she had been working for a Malaysia based West African international drug trafficking organization since 2009, where her primary role was to recruit drug mules from the Philippines to deliver narcotics worldwide. The document further stated that Sergio had travelled extensively to Thailand, Hong Kong, and Singapore over the previous 6 years, and that she used the promise of gainful employment abroad as a way to entice potential recruits to work as couriers. Justice Secretary Leila de Lima also released a statement that intelligence from the Philippine National Police and the Philippine Drug Enforcement Agency indicated that Sergio had started as a drug mule herself before being promoted to a recruiter on behalf of the crime syndicate she smuggled narcotics for.

On May 20, 2015, Sergio submitted a counter-affidavit to the Department of Justice in relation to the charges brought by the N.B.I, denying all allegations of involvement with Veloso's legal issues and instead blaming two West African men named "Ike" and "John" for tricking her into carrying the suitcase containing drugs to Indonesia. On July 9, 2015, the Department of Justice approved on the filing of charges of illegal recruitment, estafa, and human trafficking against Maria Kristina Sergio and her partner, Julius Lacanilao. On September 18, 2015, Maria Kristina Sergio and Julius Lacanilao pleaded not guilty to all charges during their arraignment at the Baloc Regional Trial Court in Nueva Ecija.

=== Pre-Trial legal proceedings ===
In August 2016, motions were heard to depose Veloso's testimony regarding the human trafficking charges against Maria Kristina Sergio and Julius Lacanilao. The motion was granted, but no time was set for when the deposition was to occur. Judge Reyes denied a defense motion in November to block the deposition, stating she found no compelling reason to reverse her decision. On February 13, 2017, Judge Anarica J. Castillo-Reyes affirmed the motion to take Veloso's deposition, which was set on April 27, 2017. The Court of Appeals ordered a temporary restraining order on March 24, preventing the prosecutor from interviewing Veloso. Associate Justice Ramon M. Bato Jr., on behalf of the Court of Appeals, issued a proclamation on May 22 finding in favor of the defense motion that disallowed taking Veloso's deposition, because it was claiming that it violated the plaintiffs' right to face their accuser.

On June 16, 2017, the Veloso family filed a motion for reconsideration through the National Union of Peoples' Lawyers (NUPL), asking the Court of Appeals to rescind the order preventing the prosecutor from deposing Veloso at the Yogyakarta prison. The family's argument for the motion was that Veloso may have run out of time and be executed before she could testify. The motion stated, "No damage can be irreparable as what Mary Jane stands to suffer — to be muzzled before she is silenced forever, to die without ever being heard.” The Office of the Solicitor General (OSG) also requested the Court of Appeals to reconsider their ruling. The appeals court later affirmed their decision on June 5, 2018, through Bato, dismissing the motion filed by the OSG.

On September 3, 2018, the Veloso family, along with their lawyers from the NUPL, took the case to the Philippine's highest court, the Supreme Court of the Philippines, in an attempt to overturn the decision made by the Court of Appeals. In January 2019, rumors that Veloso had been executed spread, which were denied by both Indonesia's Attorney General's Office and her lawyer. After more than a year, on October 9, 2019, the Supreme Court granted the petition and reversed the Court of Appeals' decision preventing Veloso's deposition, stating that "to disallow the written interrogatories will curtail Mary Jane's right to due process". After a denied motion filed by lawyers from the Public Attorney's Office representing Sergio and Lacanilao, the Supreme Court reaffirmed their 2019 decision in a resolution dated August 14, 2020. Preparations for her testimony have begun, but a final date is yet to be set due to logistics issues caused by the COVID-19 pandemic, which had affected both the Philippines and Indonesia.

In December 2020, the Government of Indonesia granted permission for the taking of depositions from Veloso via written interrogatories under the following conditions:

- the deposition taking would be conducted only by officials appointed by the Indonesian Attorney General
- a consular officer from the Philippine Embassy in Jakarta may be present during the deposition taking
- the actual deposition taking would be conducted at the prison facility Veloso was currently an inmate of in Yogyakarta City
- no video cameras may be used in the taking of her testimony
- none of the lawyers in the Filipino legal case shall be present during the taking of her testimony
- the questions Veloso was to be asked must be furnished in writing in advance of the deposition taking

On March 21, 2022, the Supreme Court of the Philippines conclusively dismissed the earlier Court of Appeals decision in favour of Sergio and Lacanilao, ruling that Veloso was in fact allowed by Philippine law to give her testimony in Sergio and Lacanilao's case by deposition through written interrogatories under Rules 23 and 25 of the Rules of Court of the Philippines.

In light of the November 2024 announcement of Veloso's proposed prisoner transfer back to the Philippines, Justice Assistant Secretary Mico Clavano commented that the ongoing case against Maria Kristina Sergio and Julius Lacanilao regarding human trafficking charges at the Regional Trial Court of Nueva Ecija would now proceed much quicker, as it had previously stalled due to Veloso being unable to testify while being imprisoned in Indonesia, and that she would now be able to finally testify against her alleged recruiters in open court.

On October 30, 2025, Mary Jane's parents (Cesar and Celia) made an appeal to the Supreme Court of the Philippines urging them to expediate a ruling from the Nueva Ecija Regional Trial Court that legal hearings relating to Maria Kristina Sergio and Julius Lacanilao could take place from within the Mandaluyong prison itself, where both Veloso and Sergio were currently incarcerated. Veloso’s family believed that this would expediate proceedings and allow her to take the stand for the prosecution quicker, and thus raise the chances of her being released from custody. Although video conferencing had been used in earlier hearings, poor internet connectivity had resulted in serious disruption, and since Veloso was the last witness scheduled to testify against Sergio and Lacanilao both legal teams petitioned the court to move the trial to within the prison in order to allow in-person testimony.

In early May 2026, National Union of People’s Lawyer president Edre Olalia revealed that a case conference had taken place with the Public Prosecutor in anticipation of Veloso finally giving testimony at the Mandaluyong Regional Trial Court against Sergio and Lacanilao. On June 2, 2026, Mandaluyong RTC Judge Benedict Pichay III finally ordered the Correctional Institution for Women to allow Veloso to testify from within the prison against Sergio and Lacanila in relation to the case she filed against them for illegal recruitment, Estafa and human trafficking. Veloso began her testimony at 9:30am on June 19, 2026, while Maria Kristina Sergio and Julius Lacanilao appeared via video link as they were incarcerated at different correctional facilities (Sergio at Iwahig Penal colony on the island of Palawan and Lacanilao at Bilibid Prison on the southern outskirts of Metro Manila).

=== Sergio and Lacanila 2020 conviction ===
On January 14, 2020, the Nueva Ecija Regional Trial Court found Maria Kristina Sergio and Julius Lacanilao guilty in a separate illegal overseas employment recruitment case. Judge Anarica Castillo-Reyes sentenced the pair to life imprisonment and also imposed a ₱2,000,000 fine for violating Republic Act No. 8042 (a.k.a. the Migrant Workers and Overseas Filipinos Act of 1995). The court ruled that evidence proved both had attempted to recruit three Filipinas (Lorna Valino, Ana Marie Gonzales and Jenalyn Paraiso) for employment abroad, but they did not have the legally required license from the Philippine Overseas Employment Administration to do so.

== Impact ==
Veloso has been compared to Flor Contemplacion and Sarah Balabagan due to their backgrounds as expatriate maids with death sentences.

Veloso's case gained support in Indonesia and internationally after her appeals for clemency were rejected. Notable Indonesians who supported her included chef Rahung Nasution, French-Indonesian singer Anggun, Archbishop Ignatius Suharyo Hardjoatmodjo, and maid Erwiana Sulistyaningsih. Supporters in Veloso's native Philippines included boxer Manny Pacquiao, who even visited her at her Yogyakarta prison, migrant and human rights organizations. Internationally, United Nations Secretary General Ban Ki-moon, Nobel Peace Prize winner and East Timor President José Ramos-Horta, British tycoon Richard Branson, English musician Tony Iommi and American author Eve Ensler spoke publicly in support of Veloso.

The petition for her release at Change.org was the fastest-growing petition from the Philippines ever and gained over 250,000 signatories from over 125 countries. On April 27, 2015, during the ASEAN Summit in Kuala Lumpur, representatives from the ASEAN Youth Forum met with Widodo in an attempt to save Veloso's life.

== See also ==
- Ronald Singson, Filipino arrested in Hong Kong for drug possession
