= List of prisons in the Philippines =

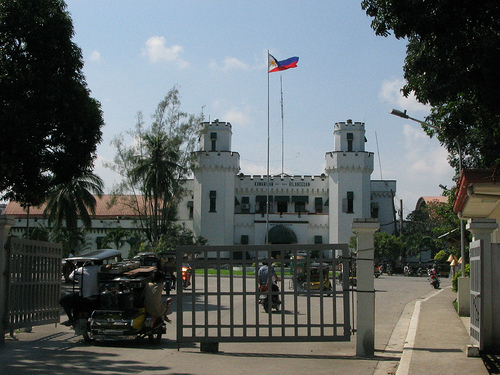
New Bilibid Prison

The following is a list of prisons (Note: For the sake of this article this includes all types of detention centers by law enforcement agencies, including correctional facilities, jails, and prisons) in the Philippines. As of 2021, there are seven national prisons and 433 jails in the country.

== Bureau of Corrections national prisons ==
Name	Location	Opened	Type	Capacity	Ref
New Bilibid Prison	Muntinlupa, Metro Manila	1940	Prison	6,345	
Correctional Institution for Women	Mandaluyong, Metro Manila	1929	Women's prison	1,008	
Iwahig Prison and Penal Farm	Puerto Princesa, Palawan	1904	Penal colony	675	
Sablayan Prison and Penal Farm	Sablayan, Occidental Mindoro	1955	Penal colony	994	
San Ramon Prison and Penal Farm	Zamboanga City	1870	Penal colony	733	
Leyte Regional Prison	Abuyog, Leyte	1972	Prison	679	
Davao Prison and Penal Farm	Panabo, Davao del Norte	1932	Penal colony	1,776	

== Other prisons ==
Name	Location	Opened	Type	Capacity	Ref
Cebu City Jail	Cebu City	1975	Prison	580	
Cebu Provincial Detention and Rehabilitation Center	Cebu City		Prison	1,600	
Manila City Jail (Old Bilibid Jail)	Manila	1866	Prison	1,100	
Quezon City Jail	Quezon City, Metro Manila		Prison	800	
Iloilo Provincial Jail	Pototan, Iloilo	2006	Prison	1,200	

== Former prisons ==
Name	Location	Opened	Closed	Type	Capacity	Ref
Iloilo Provincial Jail (Old)	Iloilo City	1911	2000s	Prison	1000	
