= Capital punishment in Indonesia =

Capital punishment is a legal penalty in Indonesia, although last executions were carried out in July 2016. The death penalty is normally enforced only in grave cases of premeditated murder, corruption in extreme cases can lead to the death penalty and the death penalty is also regularly applied to certain drug traffickers. Executions are carried out by firing squad.

== History ==
Though the death penalty existed as a punishment from the inception of the Republic of Indonesia, the first judicial execution did not take place until 1973.

The first civilian execution in Indonesia was performed in 1978. Oesin Bestari, a goat butcher from Mojokerto, was the first criminal condemned to death in post-independence Indonesia. He was convicted in 1964 after murdering six persons, all of whom were his business partners. He was executed on 14 September 1978 on a section of Kenjeran Beach, Surabaya.

The second person executed was Henky Tupanwael, a street martial artist-turned-armed robber. He was convicted in 1969 after a series of armed robberies in 1944, 1957, 1960, and 1963. He was also a notable prison escapist, with three records of prison escapes. He was executed on 5 January 1980 at government gunnery range in Pamekasan, Madura Island. His execution was notable as it featured popular Indonesian superstition at that time relating to black magic practitioners possessing weapon immunity and the delicate process required to execute him. At the time of his execution, government officials treated his place of death with an unusual process. His execution pillar was bedded with kelor leaves and arranged in a way that his body dropped directly to the bed. Instead of the traditional black cloth used to cover his eyes, a red cloth was used. He was also pinioned using coarse palm fibre ropes, but not tied to the pillar to ensure that his body dropped to the kelor leaves the bed. All was done by government officials to neutralize his immunity and ensure his death.

The third person executed was Waluyo, also known as Kusni Kasdut, a former hero-turned-armed robber. Kusni Kasdut's case attracted significant media attention at that time because he was a hero of the Indonesian National Revolution, as well as for his Robin Hood-style robberies, as he committed robberies in order to distribute his gains to the poor. He was executed on 16 February 1980 near Gresik City, East Java.

The Indonesian government does not issue detailed statistics about every person facing the death penalty in the country. In fact, "the search for precise figures is hampered by prevailing state secrecy over the death penalty." There were no executions since 2017, possibly as a result of intense and widespread international criticism the Indonesian government had to face for carrying out the last executions. President Joko Widodo has since stated that he is now open to reintroducing an official moratorium on the death penalty. Indonesia is well-noted as "a strong advocate against the death penalty for its citizens abroad."

Indonesia lastly executed the condemned criminals on 29 July 2016, and since then there was no execution. However, Indonesian courts system still awarding death penalty to criminals of various offenses, resulting in backlog of Indonesian death row inmates awaiting to be executed but cannot be executed. As of 9 October 2025, there are 596 death row inmates in Indonesia, increased from 562 in 2024, as recorded in death row statistics by Directorate General of Correction, Ministry of Immigration and Correction, as obtained by Institute for Criminal Justice Reform, an Indonesian NGO. A 2025 bill prepared by President Prabowo Subianto's Ministry of Law Directorate General of Legislation, Bill on Implementation of the Death Penalty, proposed swift execution within 30 days after the court process finalized and final decision issued by the Attorney General to be carried out by Police.

== Historical use of hanging ==
Despite Indonesia using Law No. 2/PNPS/1964 that mandated execution by firing squad, until 2023, Article No. 11 of Indonesian Criminal Code still mandated that executions must be performed by hanging and the part remains written in the code. This part was a piece of law from the colonial era, as Indonesian Criminal Code inherited from Dutch East Indies Criminal Code, but the article is superseded by Law No. 2/PNPS/1964 in practice.

=== Dutch colonial period ===
Prior introduction of hanging as formal execution method, execution methods are varied by local kingdoms and also Dutch East India Company (VOC)-controlled areas. In most of Islamic kingdoms, or formerly Islamic kingdoms, and VOC-controlled areas, decapitation by sword or glaive was the favored method of execution. In some areas, much uncommon methods also found. In Aceh, execution by spear and sroh (execution by cudgel, somewhat similar to one performed in Thailand for executing member of royalty) were reserved for enemies of the ruling Sultan. Execution by strangulation and drowning was reserved for incest committers and practiced by ancient Torajans, Minangkabauese, and Timorese. In 1642, during Antonio van Diemen rule as Governor-General of the Dutch East Indies, he codified the criminal code from previously scattered instructions and orders that written by his predecessors and booked all in Statuta Betawi (Batavian Statutes) which only affects Europeans and their descent. With this code, hanging was introduced and used to execute thieves, robbers, and adulterers. Along with hanging, many European-style execution methods also introduced like garrote-like strangulation, breaking wheels, ducking stool, and horse drawing. For locals, execution performed according to local customs observed by locals.

Much of barbaric and ancient method of execution was removed when Daendels was in rule as Governor-General in 1808. Daendels' administration later issued Edict of 22 April 1808 and established general procedure for execution. Outside military-at-war executions and executions of rebelled soldiers that subject to the respective military commanding officers at-field, all civilian executions are subject to Governor-General discretion and approval papers. During the time of Daendels' administration, hanging is not included in approved methods for execution. However, Daendels introduced various novel cruel execution methods such as burning at the stake, execution by kris stabbing, execution by scorching iron branding, execution by bludgeoning, and penal works to death.

Daendels' edict was in effect until 1848. When Jan Jacob Rochussen become Governor-General for 1845-1851 period, after reviewing Daendel's edict, Rochussen issued Interim Penalty Provisions Intermaire Strafbepelingen of 1848, which returning hanging as execution method and set it as sole approved execution method. During James Loudon time as Governor-General for 1872-1875, he codified Wetboek van Strafrecht voor Inlanders, Inlander Criminal Code of 1873, which become in effect on 1 January 1873. The criminal code retains hanging as execution method, despite the Dutch already abolished capital punishment in Netherlands since 1870. By code, hanging is applied to murderers, thieves, aggravated robbers and extortionists, pirates, and criminals committing crimes against state security. However, hanging also applied to other crimes as well. Based on surviving Dutch East Indies papers archived at National Archives of Indonesia, due to high crime rates in Batavia at this period, hanging also applied to rapists, kidnappers, assaulters, blue-on-blue military fratriciders, and street brawlers.

Under Inlander Criminal Code of 1873, executions were performed by public hanging at town parks and may be considered barbaric, as the hanging was performed by short drop style, in which three executioners played their role in the death of the condemned prisoner. One would open a trap door, one would pull the legs of the prisoner, and another would push the prisoner's shoulder below, so the condemned prisoner's death was hastened. The hanging also often not employed hood, as recorded by Dutch chronicler Justus van Maurik which recorded the execution scenes in his 1897 book "Indrukken van een “Totok,” Indische type en schetsen". One condemned prisoner, even experienced "horrific facial changes, bulged eyes, extremely protruding tongue, and blood discharge from body orifices" during this kind of hanging as recorded by him. The last person executed by this way was Tjoe Boen Tjiang, a Chinese young man that murdered two girls out of rage because the girls' father and also their husbands forbidding him to smoke the cigar. He was executed in 1896, and his execution that was reported by van Maurik in his 1897 book.

Inlander Criminal Code of 1873 eventually revised in 1915 as Dutch East Indies Criminal Code (Staatsblad 1915 No. 732). Since the 1915 revision the method of hanging changed from long drop. The effect, however, only applied to the criminals sentenced after 1918. Despite that, there is no execution by hanging performed by Dutch East Indies government after Tjoe Boen Tjiang hanging in 1896 until Indonesian Independence. After the independence of Indonesia, the Dutch East Indies Criminal Code turned into Indonesian Criminal Code by passage of Law No. 1/1946 (Regulations of Criminal Laws), with many changes of irrelevant aspects of the former Dutch East Indies to Indonesia. However, the hanging part still retained and enshrined at the Article No. 11 of both the former Dutch East Indies Criminal Code and the later Indonesia Criminal Code.

=== Temporary removal during Japanese occupation ===
The hanging was temporarily replaced after Indonesia fell into Japanese Occupation Forces during World War II. The Japanese Occupation Forces government issued Osamu Gunrei No. 1/1942 (Punishments in Accordance with the Law of the Armies) on 2 March 1942, which mandated that executions throughout Indonesia be performed by means of shooting.

=== Indonesian independence period ===
During the turbulence of the Indonesian National Revolution which resulted into divided territorial control of Indonesia between Netherlands-controlled and Indonesian controlled areas, the execution process divided also. In areas controlled with Netherlands occupation forces, the Netherlands Indies Civil Administration issued Staatsblad 1945 No. 123 (On Capital Punishment), which mandated execution with fire squad to condemned criminals, while in Indonesia-controlled areas used hanging to execute the condemned criminals. After the recognition of Indonesian independence, the criminal code still split into two between the Indonesian-controlled areas and areas formerly controlled NICA until 1958. Due to this, on 20 September 1958, the Indonesia Government issued Law No. 73/1958, to impose Law No. 1/1946 to all Indonesia, and since then Indonesia using hanging. The use of hanging retained from 1958 to 1964. On 27 April 1964, Law No. 2/PNPS/1964 issued to replace hanging with execution by firing squad.

Although the Article No. 11 of Indonesia Criminal Code no longer used since 1964, the article however used to very extraordinary cases. The last known recorded hangings was applied to the Komando Jihad ringleaders, Imran bin Muhammad Zein, Salman Hafidz, and Maman Kusmayadi for their involvements in Cicendo incident [id] and subsequent Garuda Indonesian Airways Flight 206 Hijacking, firsts of jihadism-motivated terrorism acts in Indonesia. They were sentenced under very harsh anti-subversion law Law No. 11/PNPS/1963 (On Eradication of Subversive Activities) in 1981 and sent to gallows. With this law, Imran was executed in late 1983, Salman in early February 1985, and finally Maman on 12 September 1986. All of them executed at classified government facility somewhere at the foot of Tangkuban Perahu, West Java. The Law No.11/PNPS/1963 was notable as one of harshest laws ever made in Indonesia, as it ignored Lex posteriori derogat legi priori and Lex specialis derogat legi generali doctrines to any subversive activities and any activities deemed to be threatening the ruling government (written explicitly in Article No. 19, Law No. 11/PNPS/1963) and enabling the government to impose the harshest possible punishments for said activities (Article No. 13, Law No. 11/PNPS/1963), enabling hanging to be applied for criminals convicted in subversion acts. The Law No. 11/PNPS/1963 itself repealed by Law No. 26/1999 on 19 May 1999, 13 years after the last hanging.

=== Removal ===
Hanging is removed from the new 2023 Indonesian Criminal Code. The law only mandated the execution must be performed by shooting only.

== Legal process ==
=== Use of execution by firing squad ===
Prisoners may spend a long time in prison before their sentence is finally carried out. Usually, their final appeal has been exhausted through the trial court, two appellate courts, and consideration of clemency by the president.

Prisoners are executed by firing squad, as mandated by Law No. 2/PNPS/1964. The law applies for civilian and military executions.

Prisoners and their families are notified 72 hours in advance of their pending execution. They are usually transferred to Nusa Kambangan island. They are woken up in the middle of the night and taken to a remote (and undisclosed) location before sunrise and executed by firing squad. The method has not changed since 1964.

The prisoner states their final request which the prosecutor may grant when deemed feasible and do not obstruct the execution process.

The blindfolded prisoner is led to a grassy area where they have an option to sit or stand. The firing squad is composed of twelve soldiers, who shoot at the prisoner from long range of five to ten meters, aiming at the heart. Only three fire live bullets and nine fire blank bullets. If the prisoner survives the shooting, the commander is required to shoot the prisoner in the brain with his own weapon at point blank range. The procedure is repeated until a doctor confirms no signs of life remain.

=== Possible changes from death sentence to imprisonment ===
The new 2023 Indonesian Criminal Code opened possible changes from execution to imprisonment thus sparing the prisoner. Article one hundred of the 2023 Code mandated the judge to give ten years probationary period to a criminal sentenced with execution considering the criminal is remorseful and his role in the crime worth to be sentenced for execution. After ten years, his/her sentence can be commuted to imprisonment for life and spare them. In addition, if the capital punishment is not carried after ten years after the clemency proposal from the criminal denied by the president, his/her sentence can be commuted to a term of imprisonment for life.

== Constitutionality ==
In 2007, the Indonesian Constitutional Court upheld the constitutionality of the death penalty for drug cases, by a vote of six to three. The case was brought by prisoners sentenced to death for drug crimes, including some of the Bali Nine, a group of Australian citizens sentenced to prison and the death penalty for drug trafficking in Bali in 2005.

== Statutory provisions ==
The following is a list of the criminal offenses that carry the death penalty in Indonesia:

=== Criminal offenses punishable by death based on the Indonesian Criminal Code ===
Indonesian Criminal Code (Indonesian: Kitab Undang-Undang Hukum Pidana, KUHP or KUHP 2023), Law No. 1/2023 listed several criminal offenses which can be punishable by death:

- Committing treasonous acts with intent to kill or deprive the President or Vice-President of his or her life or liberty or to render him or her unfit to govern (KUHP 2023 Art. 191)
- Committing treasonous acts with intent to make a part of whole Indonesia regions fall into foreign powers or inciting separation of Indonesia regions from Indonesia (KUHP 2023 Art. 192)
- Committing treasonous acts by aiding or protecting Indonesia's enemies at war by means of:
  - Aiding Indonesia's enemies at war by committing treachery, relinquishing of / destroying of / damaging of military installations or military posts, transportation facilities, war logistic storages, or military war funding of the Armed Forces, included also attempts to hindering, obstructing, or failing tactical strategies for attack and defense (KUHP 2023 Art. 212, verse 3, point a)
  - Causing or facilitating riot, rebellion, desertion in the body of Armed Forces (KUHP 2023 Art. 212, verse 3, point b).

The meaning of treasonous act in KUHP 2023 Art. 160 are the intention to carry out the attack has been realized by the preparation of the act. Which means it only defines treasonous act if there happens to be a premeditated conflict from the alleged separatists. Those who have sympathy for separatism or raise the Morning Star flag will not automatically be charged for treason.

- Premeditated murder (KUHP Art. 459)
- Aviation crimes and crimes against aviation facilities/infrastructures resulted in deaths or destruction of the airplane, especially (KUHP 2023 Art. 588, verse 2):
  - Violent acts against people on board of the airplane.
  - Placing tools or goods, or causing the placement of such tools or goods capable to inflict damage to the airplane (either in civilian flight or state/service flight)
- Committing genocide or taking part in genocidal acts against a nation, race, ethnic, religion, or belief (KUHP 2023 Art. 598) by heinous acts of:
  - Killing a member of said nation, race, ethnic, religion, or belief.
  - Causing immense physical and mental suffering to said nation, race, ethnic, religion, or belief.
  - Causing situations unfit for living to said nation, race, ethnic, religion, or belief.
  - Forcing acts causing birth cancellation or inhibition of reproduction of a member of said nation, race, ethnic, religion, or belief.
  - Forcing child transportation by forced removal.
- Systematic killing, eradication, banishment, force resident removal, liberty deprivation, and other internationally agreed crimes listed as crimes against humanity against civilian and committing apartheid (KUHP 2023 Art. 599, point a).
- Acts of terrorism (KUHP 2023 Art. 600), including:
  - Causing wide-spread terror and fearful situation.
  - Terror acts resulted in mass kills.
  - Terror acts resulted in mass liberty deprivation.
  - Terror acts resulted in mass loss of life or property/properties.
  - Terror acts resulted in destruction of national vital objects, environment, public facilities, and international facilities.
- Unlawful acts related to narcotics:
  - Farming exceeding 5 trees of drugs producing plants or farming resulting in more than 1 kilogram material of drug plant matters, or producing, importing, exporting, and/or distributing of Class I Narcotics exceeding 5 grams of drug material in chemical form (KUHP 2023 Art. 610, section 2, point a).
  - Producing, importing, exporting, and/or distributing of Class II Narcotics exceeding 5 grams of drug material in chemical form (KUHP 2023 Art. 610, section 2, point b).

=== Criminal offenses punishable by death based on laws other than the Indonesian Criminal Code ===
The following criminal offenses are not regulated in Indonesia Criminal Code, but in other laws. Violation of these criminal offenses resulted in punishment by death. Some of the offenses here were eventually moved to the newly coded 2023 Indonesian Criminal Code or given lesser sentences by the new Criminal Code.

- Crimes committed during national emergency announced by the President (Government Regulation in Lieu of Law No. 27/1948). The specified crimes in the regulation are: (1) Aiding prison escapist during national emergency, either the prisoner is in house arrest or in other detention facilities, (2) Violent robbery during national emergency, (3) Violent extortion during national emergency, (4) Damaging public infrastructures resulting in decommissioning of said facilities such as factories, train stations, railways, roads, bridges, telegraphic and telephone utilities, electrical facilities and utilities, gas pipes, radio transmitters, and dams; or causing the disruption of river by making illegal dam(s); or illegally diverting river flow during national emergency.
- Committing economic crimes (Law No. 5/PNPS/1959):
  - Economic crimes with the intent to hindering/obstructing government programs related in the matters of: (1) food and clothing, (2) national and public security, and (3) against national interest in countering economy of imperialists and separatists in West Papua (Law No. 5/PNPS/1959). Including the acts of (1) Smuggling, (2) Customs fraud, (3) Banking crimes, (4) Commercial crimes, (5) Securities crimes, (6) Financing and financial service crimes, (7) Brand counterfeiting, (8) Environmental crimes resulted in environmental damages which affected economy of population, (9) Corruption, (10) Economic criminal acts resulted in threatening national security, and (11) Economic criminal acts resulted in damages to Head of State's dignity.
  - Committing specific economic crimes, as defined by Emergency Law No. 7/1955, crimes of: (1) Manipulating stocks and prices of basic needs (foods, clothing, housing, or building materials) and strategic staples (rice, sugar, coffee, cooking oil, meats, eggs, and chili or spices), (2) Causing foodstuffs to become scarce and limited, resulting in soaring prices and uncontrolled inflation, (3) Illegal stockpiling of food stuffs, (4) Manipulating rice production, (5) Performing unfair middleman (tengkulak) practices and/or unfair rice milling practices resulted in economic harms to rice farmers, and (6) Illegal foreign exchange practices; and also acts of obstructing the investigation of such economic crimes (Emergency Law No. 7/1955 Art. 26), fleeing from the authorities with intention to not taking responsibility or not taking administrative sanctions resulted by such offense (Emergency Law No. 7/1955 Art. 32), and/or acted by himself or using others to transfer the wealth/assets gained from the economic crimes in order to destroy/erase evidence or making the assets/wealth irrecoverable and unclaimable by the state repossession mechanism (Emergency Law No. 7/1955 Art. 33). Having kinship relation with the offender, whether by blood or by marriage also may account to affect one, due to prejudice that his/her sibling(s), cousin(s), child/children, or spouse and in-law(s) may know or possessing knowledge or enjoying the financial gain or take part in such crimes, unless they can prove to the court they are not involved in economic criminal act committed by the offender (Emergency Law No. 7/1955 Art. 34 verse 3).
  - As the Regulation of Central War Administrator/Chief of Staff of Indonesian Army No. Prt/Peperpu/013/1958, the offender, whether is member of military or not, such economic crime offenders will be branded as corruptor and enemy of the state and its military and will be executed under military law (for this part, along with the Regulation of Chief of Staff of Indonesian Navy No. Prt/Z.I/1/7 that specifically mention if a navy is an economic crime offender, already repealed since Law No. 24/Prp/1960).
- Committing economic crimes with the intent to disturb food and clothing distribution and equipment to produce food and clothing resulted in national wide chaos and disturbance in national economic system. Including the acts of (1) Smuggling, (2) Customs fraud, (3) Banking crimes, (4) Commercial crimes, (5) Securities crimes, (6) Financing and financial service crimes, (7) Brand counterfeiting, and (8) Environmental crimes resulted in environmental damages which affected economy of population in which the criminal acts deliberately done with ill intentions, threatening and disadvantaging public interests, and the act performed for gaining enormous financial gains and advantages (Law No. 21/Prp/1959).
- Corruption under "certain circumstances," including repeat offenders and corruption committed during times of national emergency/disaster (Law No. 31/1999 on Corruption)
- Gross violations of human rights (Law No. 26/2000 on Human Rights Courts), including:
  - Attempting and conspiring genocide and crimes against humanity (Law No. 26/2000 Art. 41).
  - Being military commander (for military) or being leader or supervisor (for police or civilian) responsible to genocide and crimes against humanity (Law No. 26/2000 Art. 42).
- Placing, neglecting in deliberation, involving, or ordering children to actively contribute and/or involved in producing or distributing drugs (Law No. 23/2002 on Children Protection Art. 89 and Law No. 35/2014 on Children Protection (Amendment I) Art. 89 verse 1).
- Terrorisms (Law No 15/2003 as amended by Law No. 5/2018)
  - Unlawful import, producing, distributing, accepting, possessing, and hiding weapons, firearms, ammunitions, and explosives for terrorism purposes.
  - Using CBRN weapons for terrorism, including chemical, biological, and radiological and nuclear.
  - Planning and encouraging people to commit terrorism.
  - Attempting, conspiring, and assisting terrorism acts.
  - Providing information and assistance from outside Indonesia to terrorism acts.
  - Using force or threatened to use violent force.
  - Unlawful import, producing, distributing, accepting, possessing, and hiding CBRN weapons for terrorism purposes.
- Sexual assault against multiple victims (more than 1 victim) resulted in serious injury, mental disability/insanity, infecting victims with venereal diseases, causing damages to or causing dysfunction of the victim's reproductive system, and/or resulted to death of the victim (Law No. 23/2002 Art. 89 and by Law No. 17/2016 (Amendment II) Art. 81 verse 5)
- Development, production, obtaining, transfer or use of chemical weapons (Law No. 9/2008 relating to chemical weapons, Art. 14 and 27)

=== Offenses punishable by death based on Indonesia Military Criminal Code ===
Indonesia Military Criminal Code (Indonesian: Kitab Undang-Undang Hukum Pidana Militer) is Staatsblad 1934 No. 167 and revised and amended several times with (1) Law No. 39/1947, (2) Law No. 5/1950, and (3) Law No. 31/1997. It listed several offenses that punishable by death. The offenses are:

- Committing treason by assisting enemies and causing disadvantage to Indonesia (KUHPM Art. 64).
- Participating in Rebellion (KUHPM Art. 65).
- Espionage (KUHPM Art. 67).
- Breaking military secrets/oath/promises and plotting for criminal conspiration (KUHPM Art. 68).
- Act of cowardice at war, such as: (1) Deliberately surrendered himself/herself to the enemy, (2) Deliberately surrendered himself/herself to the enemy his/her commanding post or military transport (whether it is land transportations, ships, or airplanes) at war, (3) Deliberately not participating at combat situation, or commanding his/her troops/unit to not engage with the enemy, (4) Surrendering command over area or troops under his/her leadership to the enemy (KUHPM Art. 73).
- Deliberately surrendered during the war without giving strict orders and suppressed the fighting spirit and disrupted the military community (KUHPM Art. 74).
- Acted against the law in his/her capacity as military commander, or manager or supervisor of military-run facilities committing sabotage or other serious criminal acts resulted in failure of military operation (KUHPM Art. 76).
- Breaking pact or treaty or agreement made with the enemy (KUHPM Art. 82).
- Desertion in war (KUHPM Art. 89).
- Insubordination acts resulted in mutiny aboard the military ship or airplane, in which the acts committed far from nearby military installations/positions, resulting in delayed responses, help, and aid from the military (KUHPM Art. 109).
- Causing or participating in chaos at war, in which the acts committed far from nearby military installations/positions, resulting in delayed responses, help, and aid from the military (KUHPM Art. 114).
- Committing rebellion in peaceful period, desertion, and neglect the prevention of war or crime while he/she actually able to prevent it (KUHPM Art. 133).
- Misusing his/her authorities and deliberately committed violent acts to a person or a group, resulted in destruction of properties (KUHPM Art. 137).
- Deliberately committed violent acts to the dead, sick, and/or wounded in war, whether he/she committed it personally alone (KUHPM Art. 138), or taking participation in a group (KUHPM Art. 142, verse 2).

=== Criminal offenses formerly punishable by death ===
- Subversion (Law No. 11/PNPS/1963, repealed by Law No. 26/1999). The law repealed due to historical use against anti-Soekarnoists and anti-Soehartoists, causing the perpetuation of Old Order and New Order governments. Repealed as part of the Reformation after the Fall of Suharto. Subversive activities as defined in this law were:
  - (1) the acts that (1a) manipulating, damaging, or misusing state ideology, (1b) any attempts to overthrow and damaging the government and all of its apparatuses, and (1c) hate crimes with intention to damage cordial relations of friendly states, or to damage or disturb state industries, production systems, trading, cooperative, and transportation systems.
  - (2) all acts that considered forms of the expression of sympathy to the state enemies or enemy state(s).
  - (3) all acts that resulted in building damage or building destruction of public buildings or building that allocated for public uses or privately owned facilities that allocated for public use.
  - (4) all acts that considered forms of spying, including (4a) owning or attempting to own or distributing state-owned materials to be disclosed to the state enemies or foreign states, in which the materials are sensitive in nature such as (i) military secrets (maps, designs, images, reports/writings, and/or any forms of military secrets), or (ii) state political, diplomatical, and economical secrets, (4b) performing research or investigation on behalf of the state enemies or foreign states to obtain military secrets or state political, diplomatical, and economical secrets, (4c) getting involved in or participating in or distributing state enemies or foreign states propaganda, (4d) acting against state interests resulting in criminal investigation, prosecution, deprivation or restriction of liberty, criminal punishment or other action by or under the authority of the enemy state(s) resulted in Indonesia disadvantages, (4e) giving or receiving goods or money from state enemies or enemy states as payment of services advantaging state enemies or enemy states and disadvantaging Indonesia.
  - (5) all acts that considered forms of sabotaging, including damaging, obstructing, impeding, or disadvantaging the government' manufacture of/efforts in (i) staple goods needed for people's lives, whether it is imported or produced by the government, (ii) goods that its manufacture, distribution, and cooperative efforts are subject to the government control, (iii) objects and projects overseen by the government directly, such as military, state industries, state manufactures, and state trading, (iv) public works, (v) state installations, and (vi) transportation systems (land, waters, air, and telecommunication).
- Espionage and leaking information of state atomic secrets (Law No. 31/PNPS/1964, repealed by Law No. 10/1997). The law changed from death sentence to the imprisoned for life.
- Unlawful import, producing, distributing, accepting, possessing, hiding, exporting from Indonesia, and misuse of firearms and/or other explosives (Emergency Law No. 12/1951). The penalty eventually changed to the 7 to 15 years imprisonment under the 2023 Indonesian Criminal Code (KUHP 2023 Art. 306 and 307).
- Informing the positions of military installations or posts, transportation facilities, logistic storages, or military war funding of the Armed Forces (KUHP Art. 124 section 2, point a). In KUHP 2023 such crimes will be given 15 years imprisonment (KUHP 2023 Art. 212, verse 2).
- Committing fraud in delivery of military materials in time of war. In old KUHP, such crimes will be punishable by death (KUHP Art. 127). In KUHP 2023, such crimes will be given 5 years imprisonment (KUHP 2023 Art. 214).
- Deadly acts against the head of state of a friendly state, either directly killing or involved in seditious/treasonous acts resulted in death. In old KUHP, such crimes will be punishable by death (KUHP Art. 140, section 2 and 3). In KUHP 2023, such crimes will be given 12 years imprisonment (KUHP 2023 Art. 224).
- Gang robbery resulted in death (KUHP Art 365). In KUHP 2023, the act will be given 15 years imprisonment if committed alone and given 20 years imprisonment if committed together with conspiracy (KUHP 2023 Art. 479, verse 3 and 4).
- Piracy resulting in death (KUHP Art. 444). In KUHP 2023, the act will be given 12 years imprisonment (KUHP 2023 Art. 542).
- Unlawful seizure or defending the seizure or attempting to taking control an airplane in flight, without force and with force, and if the act were: (1) committed by 2 persons or more together, (2) as continuation of a conspiration, (3) premeditated, (4) causing grave injury to a person or persons, (5) damaging the airplane and threatening the passengers and the flight, and (6) carried out with the intention of depriving someone of one's freedom or continuing to deprive someone of one's freedom (KUHP Art. 479k section 2). In KUHP 2023, the act will be given 15 years imprisonment if resulted in death but without destruction of the airplane and 20 years imprisonment if resulted in death and destruction of the airplane (KUHP 2023 Art. 580, verse 1 and 2).

== Execution statistics ==
Executions in Indonesia during and after Suharto era:

Year	Convict	Age (Gender)	Nationality	Crime	Location
2016	Freddy Budiman	39 (♂)	Indonesia	Drug trafficking	Surabaya
2016	Seck Osmane	38 (♂)	Senegal/Nigeria	Drug trafficking	
2016	Humphrey Jefferson Ejike	(♂)	Nigeria	Drug trafficking	
2016	Michael Titus Igweh	(♂)	Nigeria	Drug trafficking	
2015	Ang Kiem Soei	(♂)	Netherlands	Drug trafficking	Tangerang
2015	Marco Archer	53 (♂)	Brazil	Drug trafficking	Jakarta
2015	Daniel Enemuo	38 (♂)	Nigeria	Drug trafficking	
2015	Namaona Denis	48 (♂)	Malawi	Drug trafficking	
2015	Rani Andriani	38 (♀)	Indonesia	Drug trafficking	Tangerang
2015	Tran Bich Hanh	(♀)	Vietnam	Drug trafficking	
2015	Martin Anderson	(♂)	Nigeria	Drug trafficking	Bali
2015	Raheem Agbaje Salaami	(♂)	Nigeria	Drug trafficking	Bali
2015	Sylvester Obiekwe Nwolise	(♂)	Nigeria	Drug trafficking	Bali
2015	Okwudili Oyatanze	(♂)	Nigeria	Drug trafficking	Bali
2015	Zainal Abidin	(♂)	Indonesia	Drug trafficking	Bali
2015	Rodrigo Gularte	42 (♂)	Brazil	Drug trafficking	Bali
2015	Andrew Chan	31 (♂)	Australia	Drug trafficking	Bali
2015	Myuran Sukumaran	34 (♂)	Australia	Drug trafficking	Bali
2013	Ademi (or Adami or Adam) Wilson alias Abu	(♂)	Malawi	Drug trafficking	
2013	Suryadi Swabuana	(♂)	Indonesia	Murder	
2013	Jurit bin Abdullah	(♂)	Indonesia	Murder	
2013	Ibrahim bin Ujang	(♂)	Indonesia	Murder	
2008	Amrozi bin Nurhasyim	46 (♂)	Indonesia	Terrorism (2002 Bali bombings)	Bali
2008	Imam Samudra	38 (♂)	Indonesia	Terrorism (2002 Bali bombings)	Bali
2008	Huda bin Abdul Haq alias Mukhlas	48 (♂)	Indonesia	Terrorism (2002 Bali bombings)	Bali
2008	Rio Alex Bulo alias Rio Martil	39 (♂)	Indonesia	Murder	
2008	Tubagus Yusuf Maulana alias Usep	(♂)	Indonesia	Murder	
2008	Sumiarsih	(♀)	Indonesia	Murder	
2008	Sugeng	(♂)	Indonesia	Murder	
2008	Ahmad Suradji	59 (♂)	Indonesia	Murder	
2008	Samuel Iwuchukuwu Okoye	(♂)	Nigeria	Narcotics	
2008	Hansen Anthony Nwaliosa	(♂)	Nigeria	Narcotics	
2007	Ayub Bulubili	(♂)	Indonesia	Murder	
2006	Fabianus Tibo	61 (♂)	Indonesia	Riot	Poso
2006	Marinus Riwu	(♂)	Indonesia	Riot	
2006	Dominggus da Silva	(♂)	Indonesia	Riot	
2005	Astini Sumiasih	49 (♀)	Indonesia	Murder	
2005	Turmudi	(♂)	Indonesia	Murder	
2004	Ayodhya Prasad Chaubey	(♂)	India	Drug trafficking	North Sumatra
2004	Saelow Prasert	(♂)	Thailand	Drug trafficking	North Sumatra
2004	Namsong Sirilak	(♀)	Thailand	Drug trafficking	North Sumatra
2001	Gerson Pande	(♂)	Indonesia	Murder	East Nusa Tenggara
2001	Fredrik Soru	(♂)	Indonesia	Murder	East Nusa Tenggara
2001	Dance Soru	(♂)	Indonesia	Murder	East Nusa Tenggara
1998	Adi Saputra	(♂)	Indonesia	Murder	Bali
1995	Chan Tian Chong		Indonesia	Narcotics	
1995	Karta Cahyadi	(♂)	Indonesia	Murder	Central Java
1995	Kacong Laranu	(♂)	Indonesia	Murder	Central Sulawesi
1992	Sergeant Adi Saputro	(♂)	Indonesia	Murder	
1991	Azhar bin Muhammad	(♂)	Indonesia	Terrorism	
1990	Satar Suryanto	(♂)	Indonesia	Subversion (politics, 1965 case)	
1990	Yohannes Surono	(♂)	Indonesia	Subversion (politics, 1965 case)	
1990	Simon Petrus Soleiman	(♂)	Indonesia	Subversion (politics, 1965 case)	
1990	Noor alias Norbertus Rohayan	(♂)	Indonesia	Subversion (politics, 1965 case)	
1989	Tohong Harahap	(♂)	Indonesia	Subversion (politics, 1965 case)	
1989	Mochtar Effendi Sirait	(♂)	Indonesia	Subversion (politics, 1965 case)	
1988	Abdullah Umar	(♂)	Indonesia	Subversion (politics, Islamist activist)	
1988	Bambang Sispoyo	(♂)	Indonesia	Subversion (politics, Islamist activist)	
1988	Sukarjo	(♂)	Indonesia	Subversion (politics, 1965 case)	
1988	Giyadi Wignyosuharjo	(♂)	Indonesia	Subversion (politics, 1965 case)	
1987	Liong Wie Tong alias Lazarus	(♂)	Indonesia	Murder	
1987	Tan Tiang Tjoen	(♂)	Indonesia	Murder	
1987	Sukarman	(♂)	Indonesia	Subversion (politics, 1965 case)	

=== Foreign nationals ===
The people on death row include foreign nationals, all but one of whom were convicted of drug-related offenses. These foreign inmates come from 18 different countries: Australia, Brazil, Mainland China, France, Ghana, India, Iran, Malawi, Malaysia, Netherlands, Nigeria, Pakistan, Philippines, Senegal, Sierra Leone, the United Kingdom, the United States, Vietnam and Zimbabwe.
