= Astini Sumiasih =

Executed Indonesian serial killer

- Born: 22 September 1955; Jombang, Indonesia
- Died: 20 March 2005 (aged 49); Surabaya, Indonesia
- Cause of death: Execution by firing squad
- Other name: "Mrs. Astini"
- Conviction: Murder x3
- Penalty: Death

Details
- Victims: 3
- Span of crimes: 1992–1996
- Country: Indonesia
- State: East Java
- Date apprehended: 1996

Astini Sumiasih (22 September 1955 – 20 March 2005), better known by her pseudonym Mrs. Astini, was an Indonesian serial killer who killed three neighbors from whom she had borrowed money between 1992 and 1996, dismembering their bodies afterwards. For her crimes, she was sentenced to death and subsequently executed by firing squad in 2005.

== Debt ==
Astini was known for frequently borrowing money from her neighbors due to her poor financial situation. She owed Rp20,000 to Puji Astutik, Rp1,250,000 to Mrs. Sukur (also known as Rahayu), and Rp250,000 plus Rp300,000 (a total of Rp550,000) to Sri Astutik Wijaya. When she refused to repay them, the debt collectors responded with harsh words, which she later used as an excuse to claim she had been insulted.

== Murders ==
Born in Jombang on 22 September 1955, Sumiarsih was a mother of three living in Malang together with her husband and three children. She was generally known as a friendly, yet temperamental woman who frequently borrowed large amounts of money from her neighbors, which she was often unable to pay back.

In August 1992, one of her neighbors, Rahayu (or Ibu Sukur), went to her home and demanded that she give her 1,250,000 rupiah, but when Sumiasih told her that she didn't have the money, she started insulting her. Angered by her harsh remarks, she killed Rahayu on the spot and then dismembered her body. On 1 November 1993, she repeated the act with another neighbor, Sri Astutik Wijaya, whom she owed between 250,000 and 300,000 rupiah.

In February 1996, she was approached by yet another neighbor, Puji Astutik, who demanded that she return 20,000 rupiah she had borrowed. When she informed her that she didn't have the money, she started insulting her, and in an emotional fit, she grabbed a piece of iron and hit her on the head, killing Astutik on the spot. She then dragged the body to the kitchen and wrapped it up in a floormat, before she proceeded to dismember it into ten pieces. Astutik's body parts were then put in a plastic bag and scattered around trash bags and rivers around Surabaya.

== Arrest, trial and imprisonment ==
Some months later, a plastic bag containing a severed head was found in Wonorejo and immediately reported to the police. The head itself was brought to Soetomo Hospital, and when news of the discovery spread, a man contacted the doctors, claiming that his older sister Puji had gone missing. When the man was allowed into the morgue, he immediately recognized the head as that of his missing sister. Upon this discovery, the man and his relatives were questioned thoroughly, revealing to police that Astutik was last seen visiting the house of their neighbor, Astini Sumiasih.

As a result, Sumiasih was immediately arrested and brought for interrogation, where she readily admitted to the crime, as well as her two previous murders. She was brought to trial before the Surabaya District Court and officially sentenced to death on 17 October 1996, and sent off to the Women's Correctional Institution in Malang to await execution. Over the following years, she repeatedly submitted requests for clemency to the Supreme Court and the President, all of which were repeatedly denied. While sitting on death row, she was often visited by Pastor Anderas Nurmandala, who later aided her children in graduating from high school.

== Execution ==
After her last petition for clemency was denied in 2004, Sumiasih was remanded for a five-day isolation period to the Medaeng Detention Center in March 2005, where she was visited by her husband and children.

On 20 March 2005, accompanied by her lawyer and the prosecutorial team, Sumiasih was escorted to an undisclosed location near Surabaya, where she was subsequently executed by the East Java Regional Police Mobile Brigade. She was shot six times directly into the heart, dying on the spot. Her body was then transported for an autopsy at the Soetomo Hospital, and afterwards buried at the public cemetery in Surabaya, according to her family's wishes.

== Aftermath ==
Following her execution, a debate over the cruelty of the death penalty was enacted in the country and whether Sumiasih's sentence should've been reduced. Her house was rented out to several families, who supposedly reported that it smelled of blood.

== See also ==
- Capital punishment in Indonesia
- List of serial killers by country
