= Oesin Bestari =

Indonesian serial killer (c. 1926–1978)

- Born: Husein bin Umar Baftari; 1926; Krian, Sidoarjo Regency, Surabaya Residency, Dutch East Indies
- Died: September 14, 1978 (aged 51–52); Kenjeran Beach, Surabaya, Indonesia
- Status: Executed by shooting
- Convictions: Robbery, Murder
- Penalty: Death

Details
- Victims: 25
- Date: 1961 – 1964
- Country: Indonesia
- State: Present East Java
- Weapons: Iron mortar, Knives

Oesin Bestari (born Husein bin Umar Baftari) (c. 1926 – 14 September 1978) was an Indonesian of Arabic-descent goat butcher and goat leather trader turned robber and serial killer active around 1961 to 1964 in present day Mojokerto Regency, East Java Province. He was the first person executed by civil execution (not military execution) in post-independence Indonesia.

== Early life ==
Not much known about his early life. He was born to Umar Baftari, an Arab goat butcher, and had a brother named Alwi bin Umar Baftari a.k.a. Mamak who became his future partner-in-crime.

In 1961, he married Rafiah, a Javanese girl from Mojokerto. After his marriage, he moved to Kalimati, a village in Tarik District, Sidoarjo Regency and rented a house belonging to the Mas’ud family, another Arab. Shortly after the wedding, his father died and his mother moved to live with Oesin's family. Sometime later, he moved to Seduri Village, Mojosari District, Mojokerto Regency, on the border with Surabaya Regency, where he committed the majority of his killings. He also rented a house at Jagalan Village, Kranggan District, Mojokerto Regency as his second home.

== Killing spree ==
During the span of 1961 to 1964, assisted with his brother Mamak and his servant Andi a.k.a. Iteng, Oesin murdered 25 people. He first searched for potential victims from fellow traders in local markets. After befriending them, he lured his victims with offers to invest in his businesses in leather trade, fertilizers, or gold by confidence tricks. His victims were made to meet him personally in his home in Seduri Village and bring their money or gold (and sometime their motorcycles or expensive watches) with them. There, Mamak and Iteng talked to the victims while giving them coffee or tea. Either the beverages were laced with some substance or employing some kind of hypnosis methods, his victims had their awareness weakened during the talk. When they were weak, he then smashed his victims' heads with an iron mortar or stabbed them to death before robbing them and disposing their bodies. Many of his victims were thrown into the Brantas River, or he buried on the riverbanks. Some were even buried in his own home due to the number of his victims that he killed in a day.

At these times, Oesin often asked his wife and his mother to take his children away to his relatives' home, saying that his "investors" had come from far-away cities and need for lodging for business.

Oesin killed a lot of his fellow Arab and Arab Indonesians traders, as well as Chinese Indonesians traders. Among many of his victims, some of his notable victims were:

1. Juli, 26, a rich young trader from Tulungagung. Killed c. May 1961, based on a missing person report filed to the Police, making Juli his early victim. From Juli, Oesin and his associates robbed Rp 80,000.00 (around US$7,078.00 worth in 1961) along with Juli's expensive watches, golden necklace and 2 golden bracelets.
2. Jayadi, 27, a rich young trader from Kediri. Killed c. June 1961. From Jayadi, Oesin and his associates robbed Rp 15,000.00 (around US$1,327.125 worth in 1961) along with Jayadi's 50 grams of gold.
3. Siram, unknown age, a trader from Jombang. Killed sometime in 1961, shortly after Jayadi's killing. From Siram, Oesin and his associates robbed Rp 47,000.00 (around US$4158.325 worth in 1961) along with Siram's motorcycle, and expensive watches.
4. Jazid bin Mari, unknown age, an Arab trader from Sidoarjo. Killed in 1963. It was unknown how much Oesin and his associates got from him. However, his killing by Oesin much sadistic because Oesin killed him by drowning him by tied him with 40 kg of iron scraps to the Brantas River.

Due to the sheer number of his victims, Oesin claimed he had lost track of number of his kills and financial gains he got by robbing his victims during 1962 to 1964.

== Capture ==
However, on 11 May 1964, his killing spree eventually ended when Masfud, a gold trader from Kauman Village, Prajurit Kulon District, Mojokerto was lured into Oesin's home at Seduri Village. During his attempted robbery at Oesin's home, Masfud screamed during a scuffle. Although Masfud was killed by Oesin and his associates, his scream was enough to attract Oesin's neighbors and patrolling police officers passing in front of his home. While trying to take Rp 1,500,000.00 (around US$1,845,000 worth in 1964) brought by Masfud, the police caught him and his associates red-handed with blood along with Masfud’s body, leading to Oesin and his associates’ capture. Oesin unsuccessfully attempted to bribe the police with Rp 100,000.00 (around US$123,000 worth in 1964).

Police, along with officers from the attorney general and the Mojokerto City government which supervised directly by Mayor Raden Sudibyo, located all 25 victims which he disposed in various locations, including his two rented homes. Most of his victims were already decomposed beyond recognition by the time of discovery due to being submerged in the Brantas River for a long time. Since the first excavation of his victim's burial sites on 25 June 1964, residents discovered many unidentifiable human body parts washed ashore along the Brantas riverbanks and buried them in pauper's plots.

== Effects in politics ==
Due to his sheer number of his victims and extreme methods employed by him, both the Communist Party of Indonesia (PKI) and the Masyumi Party accused that his murders are political in nature. The killings happened during the political rivalry between communists and Islamists preceding the G30S Movement. For Masyumi, Oesin was a "communist extremist" who enjoyed killing rich people, who were enemies of the working and farmer class. For the PKI, Oesin was an "Islamic extremist" as some of his victims were also connected to the PKI in some ways. However, political motives were ruled out after Oesin admitted that his killings were purely for financial gain.

== Trial and execution ==
Oesin and his associates Mamak and Iteng were tried in the Surabaya High Court. In 1967, Oesin, as the main criminal, was sentenced to death, while Mamak and Iteng, as they were accessories to the crimes, were sentenced to 20-years imprisonment. Oesin become the first Indonesian citizen condemned with capital punishment by a civilian court. He was a death row inmate for 11 years.

During his time in Kalisosok Prison, Krembangan District, Surabaya, Oesin was reformed and became a model prisoner. He mastered the art of tailoring and become a tailor at the prison's vocational depot. He also become an informant for the warden and helped him in failing multiple prison break attempts and plots. On 1977, Oesin submitted his last clemency to President Suharto, who rejected it.

On 14 September 1978, Oesin was executed at dawn on a section of Kenjeran Beach, Surabaya. At midnight before the execution, he was taken by two wardens from his cell in Kalisosok Prison and transported to Kenjeran Beach, where Mobile Brigade Corps (Brimob) executioners from Regional Police Command Region X (now Kepolisian Daerah Jawa Timur (Polda Jatim), East Java Regional Police) were waiting for him. He was given white clothing to wear and had an ustadz as his spiritual advisor, as prescribed by Law No. 2/PNPS/1964, and tied to the wooden execution post that stuck into the beach' sand. He requested his ustadz to look after his brother, Alwi, who at that time is imprisoned. When the public prosecutor official addressed him to be blindfolded or not, he replied to the officer with his last words Terserah bapak ("It is up to you, sir"). The officer then blindfolded him, marked his heart with the aid of a doctor, and the execution commenced. After a volley of shot released by his executioners, a bullet hit his heart and killed him on the spot.

Oesin is buried somewhere at Gubeng District, Surabaya.
