= Out of Bounds (2006 film) =

- Directed by: Alexandre Leborgne; Pierre Barougier
- Written by: Alexandre Leborgne
- Produced by: Alexandre Leborgne – CAP Films; Zarafa (Les Films du Village)
- Narrated by: Alexandre Leborgne (English version); Alexandre Leborgne (Tagalog version); Alexandre Leborgne (French version)
- Cinematography: Pierre Barougier; Beta SP PAL
- Edited by: Jean Conde
- Music by: Olivier Cuinat
- Distributed by: CAP Films
- Release date: 2006
- Running time: 82 minutes
- Country: France
- Languages: English; French; Tagalog

Out of Bounds (also known as Hors les murs) is a 2006 French documentary film directed by Alexandre Leborgne and Pierre Barougier.

== Subject matter ==
Founded by the American colonial administration in 1904, The Iwahig prison on the island of Palawan in the Philippines is an open air penal colony covering 38,000 hectares of jungle and coastland. After a probationary period, long-term prisoners are allowed to become farmers, fishermen or wardens, as the prison is self-supporting and self-managed. The “lifers’” families organise their own community existence. Alejandro will soon be released. As “mayor” of the 2,300 prisoners, he acts as an experienced mentor for various inmates, such as Toting the fisherman or Rodrigo, a domestic that rebels against his boss, a violent warden. In the prison court, Alejandro acts as the prisoners’ lawyer, since he knows about everything that is going on. When he is finally released, he starts life all over again with his reconquered rights and a feeling of dignity.

== Awards ==
- Grand Prix in 2006 at the EBS International Documentary Festival held by the national public television of Korea, EBS.
- Second prize at the Milano Film Festival in 2006
- Prix special du jury - Festival International du Film d'Environnement de Paris 2006

It was nominated for the French selection of Cinéma du Réel in 2006 and was selected in the following festivals:

- Hot Docs 06 (Canada)
- Visions du Réel film festival, Nyon, Switzerland
- Festival Documenta Madrid (Spain)
- Festival du film Insulaire de l’île de Groix (France)
- Les Escales Documentaires de La Rochelle (France)
- Reykjavík International Film Festival (Iceland)
- Taiwan International Documentary Festival 2006. (Taiwan)
- Internationales Film Festival Frankfurt (Germany)
- Docsur, Tenerife (Spain)
- Dokufest, Prizren (Kosovo)
- Roma Independent Film FestivalRome
- Nordic Anthropological Film Association Festival, Bergen (Norway)
