= Rafael Ragos =

Filipino lawyer and government official (1955-2025)

Officer-in-Charge of the Bureau of Corrections
- In office November 2012 – March 2013
- Preceded by: Gaudencio Pangilinan
- Succeeded by: Franklin Bucayu

Personal details
- Born: March 18, 1955 Oas, Albay, Philippines
- Died: August 12, 2025 (aged 70)
- Occupation: Government official
- Known for: Former Bureau of Corrections officer-in-charge; testimony in Leila de Lima case

Rafael Marcos Zarzozo Ragos (March 18, 1955 – August 12, 2025) was a Filipino lawyer and government official who served as officer-in-charge of the Bureau of Corrections (BuCor) from November 2012 to March 2013. He was also a deputy director of the National Bureau of Investigation (NBI).

Ragos was a key witness in one of the drug trafficking cases filed against former senator Leila de Lima, but later recanted his testimony, claiming he was coerced by senior officials. His recantation played a role in De Lima’s acquittal in 2023.

== Early life and education ==
Ragos was born on March 18, 1955, in Oas, Albay, Philippines. He studied law and became a lawyer before joining government service.

== Career ==
=== National Bureau of Investigation ===
Ragos spent most of his career at the National Bureau of Investigation, serving for three decades and rising to the rank of deputy director.

=== Bureau of Corrections ===
In August 2012, then-Justice Secretary Leila de Lima appointed Ragos as officer-in-charge of the Bureau of Corrections, where he oversaw the New Bilibid Prison. He served in the post until March 2013.

== Role in De Lima cases ==
In 2016, Ragos became a government witness in one of the three drug-related cases filed against Senator De Lima. He initially testified that he had delivered drug money to De Lima’s residence in late 2012 upon instructions from high-profile inmates.

However, in April 2022, Ragos retracted his testimony, stating that he had been coerced by then-Justice Secretary Vitaliano Aguirre II and other officials into signing false affidavits implicating De Lima. He reiterated his recantation in court in November 2022 and apologized directly to De Lima, saying he was motivated by fear for his safety and career.

His testimony and recantation became significant in De Lima’s eventual acquittal in May 2023.

== Death ==
Ragos died on August 12, 2025, at the age of 70. His family announced his passing but did not disclose the cause of death. Former senator De Lima expressed condolences, honoring his conscience in recanting his testimony and thanking him for identifying officials she accused of conspiring against her.

== See also ==
- Leila de Lima
- New Bilibid Prison drug trafficking scandal
