= Rio Alex Bulo =

Executed Indonesian serial killer

- Born: Antonius Rio Alex Bulo; 2 May 1975; Sleman, Indonesia
- Died: 8 August 2008 (aged 33); Banyumas, Indonesia
- Cause of death: Execution by firing squad
- Other name: "Rio the Hammerhead"
- Status: Executed
- Conviction: Murder (4 counts)
- Penalty: Death

Details
- Victims: 5+
- Span of crimes: 1997 – 2001; 2005
- Country: Indonesia
- States: East Java, Central Java
- Date apprehended: 12 January 2001

Antonius Rio Alex Bulo (2 May 1975 – 8 August 2008), known as Rio the Hammerhead (Indonesian: Rio Martil), was an Indonesian serial killer who killed at least four people with a hammer between 1997 and 2001, and then his cellmate in 2005. For his crimes, he was sentenced to death and subsequently executed by firing squad in 2008.

== Biography ==
Little is known of Bulo's background. It is known that he was born on 2 May 1975, in Sleman, and, according to several sources, was reportedly an unruly child who lashed because his parents preferred to pay more attention to their business than him. Due to his erratic behaviour, his parents sent him to Jakarta, where he would be raised by his brother, whom 12 years older than him. To their dismay, his behaviour worsened, especially after his father renounced him because Rio refused to convert to his religion.

As a result, Bulo began to hang out with thugs in the Senen area, skipping school, drinking alcohol and smoking marijuana. Aside from this, he also occasionally engaged in petty crimes with his friends. Because of this, he was expelled from his brother's house and forced to live on the streets. While growing up, he supported himself by selling fake vehicle documents, but after he got married, he switched to auto theft. Due to his proficiency in the trade, managing to crush three cars in three days in exchange for money, he became relatively wealthy. When queried by his wife as to where the money had come from, Bulo claimed that he earned it by selling clothes in Jakarta.

At one point, he was imprisoned for fleeing in a stolen vehicle, but after his release, he resumed his old profession due to the lucrative offers by the dealers. However, to avoid capture, he moved out of Jakarta, and in case his victims resisted, he would attack them with a pair of hammers and kill them.

Between 1997 and 2001, Bulo is known to have killed at least 4 people, all of them car rental entrepreneurs. The first victim was in Surabaya, from whom a Sedan was stolen; the other two were killed in Semarang, while Bulo was attempting to steal their Isuzu Panther. Shortly after, a fourth attempt was tried against a man in Yogyakarta, but failed, forcing Bulo to move to Purwokerto.

On 12 January 2001, Rio entered the Rosenda Hotel in Purwokerto, where he subsequently killed businessman and lawyer Jeje Suraji in room 135 in order to steal his rented Toyota Kijang. The staff were alerted by the commotion, and immediately after Bulo left the hotel, the room was checked. When they entered, the staff found bloodstains on the walls and ceiling, and that Suraji's battered body had been left on the bed and covered with a blanket. This was immediately relayed to the hotel security guards, who managed to detain Bulo while he was still in the parking lot, before eventually handing him over to the police.

== Trial and imprisonment ==
On 14 May 2001, the Purwokerto District Court sentenced Bulo to death for his crimes, with him apologizing to the victims' families during the court proceedings. Following the verdict, his crimes were exposed to the public and quickly garnered infamy due to their brutal nature. According to an interview given to Kompas on 3 June 2001, Bulo claimed that he was 'grateful that [he] didn't die while committing a crime, but would welcome dying in the process as a punishment.'

Bulo was initially detained at the Kedungpane Prison in Semarang but then transferred to one of the prisons on Nusa Kambangan in August 2004. In there, he quickly befriended a fellow convict, embezzler Iwan Zulkarnaen, to whom he became close enough that he allowed him to teach Bulo the Quran. On 2 May 2005, during one such session, Zulkarnaen remarked that Bulo didn't seem like the type of man to be on death row: in response, Bulo became enraged and started punching him before fatally banging his head against the wall.

He then dragged the body to the bathroom, and after cleaning himself, he ran out of the cell and asked for help, claiming that Iwan had fallen and cracked his skull. Initially, he wasn't suspected of the crime, but four days later, Bulo himself admitted to killing him. As a result, he was isolated from other inmates and forbidden to have any visitors.

Over the years, all the clemency and pardon requests issued by Bulo were denied, effectively cementing his fate. On 8 August 2008, he was brought to the village of Karangtengah, Banyumas Regency, where he was subsequently executed by a 12-member firing squad. His body was then buried in the village of Kejawar. Following his execution, his wife publicly apologized to the victims' families and the community for her husband's actions.

== See also ==
- Capital punishment in Indonesia
- List of serial killers by country

== Bibliography ==
- Hermawan Aksan (2008). Traces of serial killers: serial murder cases in Indonesia and the world (in Indonesian). ISBN 9786028357043. OCLC 277180026.
- Lily Wibisono (2010). The two hammers: the case of Rio Martil (in Indonesian). ISBN 978-9793590998. OCLC 740828498.
