= Marco Archer Moreira =

Brazilian drug trafficker

Marco Archer Cardoso Moreira
- Born: 1961; Rio de Janeiro, Rio de Janeiro, Brazil
- Died: 18 January 2015 (aged 53); Nusa Kambangan, Central Java, Indonesia
- Cause of death: Execution by firing squad
- Known for: Drug trafficking
- Conviction: Drug trafficking (2004)
- Penalty: Death penalty

Details
- Imprisoned at: 2003

Marco Archer Cardoso Moreira (Manaus, Brazil, 1961 - Nusa Kambangan, Indonesia, 18 January 2015) was a Brazilian citizen sentenced to death for drug trafficking in Indonesia in 2004 after being arrested while trying to enter the country with 13.4 kg of cocaine inside the tube of a hang glider. Archer was the first Brazilian citizen to be executed abroad.

== Early life ==
Marco was born in a wealthy family in Manaus, northwestern Brazil, and his mother, Carolina, was a state civil servant in Rio de Janeiro, after the family moved to that city. He began drug trafficking as a teenager, directly with Colombian cartels, transporting cocaine from Medellin to Rio de Janeiro and to the United States. As an adult, he became a paraglider and frequently travelled to Southeastern Asia to engage in the sport. In 1997, he suffered an accident in Bali that almost cost him his life.

Archer was described financing a lavish lifestyle with the proceeds of his drug trafficking. He has been reported to have been non-violent.

== Arrest ==
Marco Archer was arrested at Soekarno–Hatta International Airport, Jakarta, in 2003, with 13.4 kg of cocaine hidden inside hang-gliding tubes. He lived on the Indonesian island of Bali for 15 years and spoke Indonesian fluently.

He fled, but was eventually captured 15 days later, while trying to escape to East Timor. He was prosecuted, convicted for drug trafficking and sentenced to death.

During his early days in prison, Archer shared a cell with fellow Brazilian convicted Rodrigo Gularte.

== Execution ==
Marco Archer was shot in the early hours of January 18, 2015, after eleven years on Indonesian death row and several delays of his execution, at Cilacap Prison, on Java Island, 400 kilometres from Jakarta, the country's capital.

Marco Archer had his last Roman Catholic rites denied, according to Roman Catholic Priest Charles Burrows who was responsible to comfort him in the last moments before his death. Archer was dragged from his cell, as he cried and said "help me."

Archer chose to be executed on foot and blindfolded, according to the Brazilian newspaper "Folha de S. Paulo". He died with a single shot fired into his chest.

Moreira was Roman Catholic, and the Brazilian embassy had hoped that at least spiritual solace would be offered to him before his death.

However, Indonesian authorities refused the presence of a priest, because there was no letter from Marco's attorney allowing spiritual presence.

After the execution of Marco Archer, his body was cremated and his ashes were transported back to Brazil.

In Rio de Janeiro, a Catholic Mass was held in honour of him.

== Reactions ==
His execution, after being denied all requests for clemency made by the Brazilian government, sparked a diplomatic rift between Brazil and Indonesia, resulting in the recall of the Brazilian ambassador in Jakarta to return to Brazil under the instructions of the government of President Dilma Rousseff.

After Archer's death, the president of Brazil, Dilma Rousseff, issued a statement saying she was outraged and the execution seriously affected the relationships between the two countries. She called the Brazilian ambassador for consultations.

== See also ==
- Rodrigo Gularte
