= Execution of Thai royalty =

Historical ceremonial execution of Thai royalty

The execution of Thai royalty (th: การสำเร็จโทษด้วยท่อนจันทน์; RTGS: kan samret thot duai thon chan; the act of executing royalty by using a sandalwood cudgel) was the process of executing Thai royalty by means of one sandalwood cudgel or more upon his or her neck or stomach. It was the ceremony most frequently performed in Thai history from the Ayutthaya period to the initial period of Rattanakosin. This kind of execution has not been performed since the reign of King Mongkut, and has officially been abolished by the first Criminal Code of Thailand promulgated in 1881 by King Chulalongkorn.

Nidhi Eoseewong, a renowned Thai academician, gave an opinion that: "I don't know how to translate this magnificently elegant ceremony of executing royalty into any foreign language. In English there exists a term derived from Latin, 'regicide', the literal meaning of which is an act of killing a monarch. The foreigner uses this word in such direct meaning, namely, knifing a monarch to death as being on a par with an act of Macbeth, or decapitating a monarch with guillotine which is not a royal guillotine as it can be used for every kind of person from prostitute to royalty...therefore, the Thai style of executing a monarch can daze and dumbfound foreigners (and the Thai people who do not understand the Thai history). The execution of Thai royalty is not like that of the foreigner."

== History ==
There existed in Section 176 of the Palace Laws under the Three Seals Law, King Phutthayotfachulalok's Revision Edition, that:

If capital punishment imposed on a person of royal blood, he or she shall be delivered to Inner Nai Waeng to be put to death at "Khok Phaya."

In the execution, Nai Waeng shall sit behind Khun Dap, the Grand Officer who shall preside over such execution. Muean Thaluang Fan shall ceremonially pay homage three times, and hit the prisoner with sandalwood cudgel, and bury him or her in the cavity.

Any Nai Waeng or Thaluang Fan seizing royal apparel or golden ring (of the buried, deceased prisoner) shall be liable to capital punishment.

In the execution, a cushion shall be placed under the prisoner.

The time this Palace Law was first promulgated is a matter of controversy in the contemporary Thai academic circle. However, there appeared on the first page of the oldest Palace Law that:

May there be virtue. Today is Saturday, the sixth day of the waxing moon in the fifth month under the lunar calendar, being the Year of Rat, 720th Era. His Majesty King Ramathibodi Borommatrailokkanat...(enacted the laws...)

The era appearing in the above page is the Chunlasakkarat (CS), which was commenced by King Anawrahta of Myanmar and was popularly used in South Asian countries in older times.

Poramin Khrueathong (th: ปรามินทร์ เครือทอง), a Thai independent academician who wrote the book "Samret thot duai thon chan" (th: สำเร็จโทษด้วยท่อนจันทน์; 'Execution by sandalwood cudgel'), has examined all royal Thai chronicles and revealed that the year King Borommatrailokkanat acceded to the throne has been recorded differently as follows:

1. The Royal Thai Chronicle, Bradley Edition : CS 796 (1434);

2. The Royal Thai Chronicle, Royal Rescript Edition : CS 796 (1434);

3. The Royal Thai Chronicle, Luang Prasoet-asksonnit Edition : CS 810 (1448), the Year of Dragon.

Prince Damrong Rajanubhab, who is now credited as Father of the Thai history, has stated that: "I believe that the Era as recorded in the Royal Thai Chronicle, Luang Prasoet-asksonnit Edition, was correct." In this case, the era in such Chronicle was CS 720, for which was before the accession of King Borommatrailokkanat for ninety year (CS 810); the Prince replied to this case that it should be the royal recorder's mistake as he might write the number "๘" (8) as "๗" (7), the correct era should be CS 820. However, according to the standard calendar, CS 820 was the Year of Dog; the Year of the Rat should be CS 722.
