= Bureau of Corrections (Philippines) =

Philippine government agency responsible for national prisons

- Kawanihan ng Koreksiyon
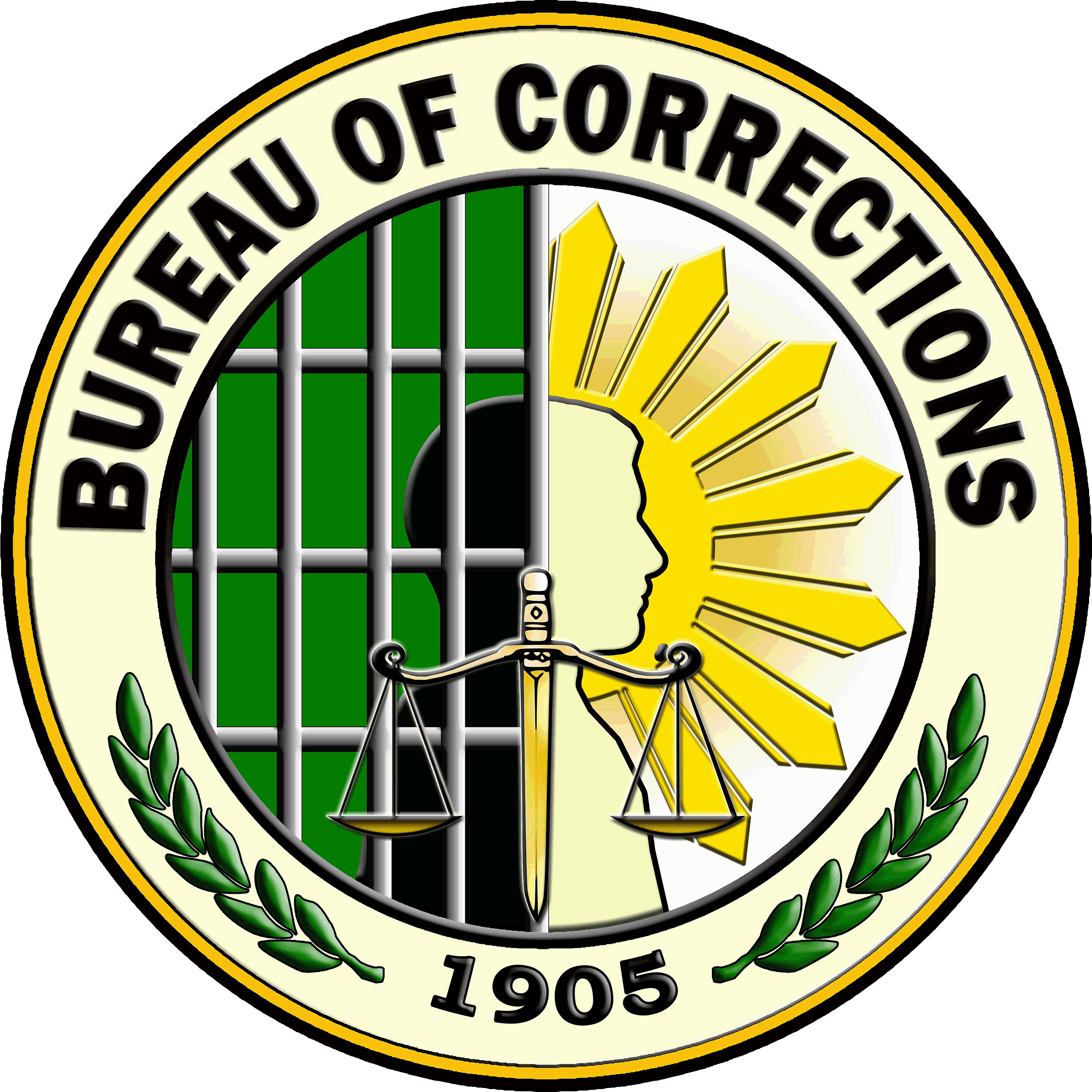
- Seal

Agency overview
- Formed: 1905
- Jurisdiction: Government of the Philippines
- Headquarters: New Bilibid Prison Reservation, Muntinlupa
- Employees: 5,646 (2024)
- Annual budget: ₱6.11 billion (2023)
- Agency executive: Gregorio Catapang Jr., Director General
- Parent agency: Department of Justice
- Website: https://www.bucor.gov.ph/

The Bureau of Corrections (BuCor /ˈbjʊ.kɔːr/; Filipino: Kawanihan ng Koreksiyon), formerly known as the Bureau of Prisons from 1905 to 1989, is an agency of the Department of Justice responsible for the custody and rehabilitation of national prisoners, commonly referred to as persons deprived of liberty (PDLs), who have been sentenced to at least three years of imprisonment. The agency is headquartered in the New Bilibid Prison Reservation in Muntinlupa.

== History ==
=== Spanish colonial era ===
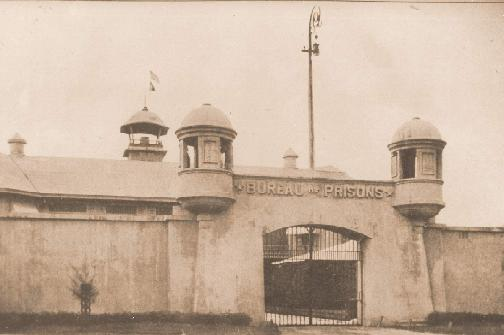
Old Bilibid Prison circa 1900

The Old Bilibid Prison which was located on Oroquieta Street in Manila was established in 1847 and by a Royal Decree formally opened on April 10, 1866. On August 31, 1870, the San Ramon Prison and Penal Farm was established in Zamboanga City for Muslim and political prisoners opposed to the rule of Spain.

=== American colonial era ===
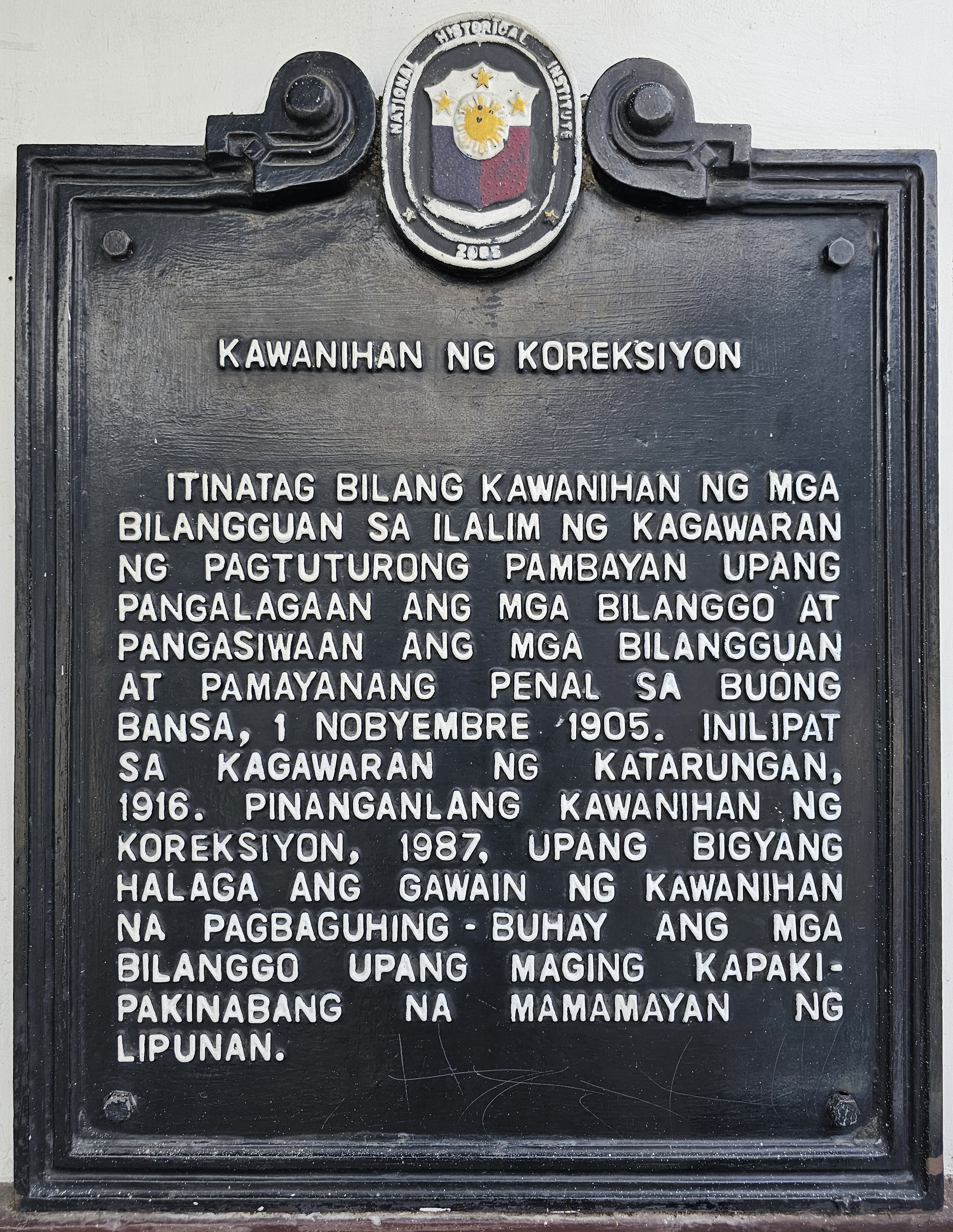
National historical marker installed in 2005

The Iuhit penal Settlement now known as Iwahig Prison and Penal Farm was established in 1904 by the Americans in 28,072 hectares of land. The land areas expanded to 40,000 hectares in the late 1950s. and expanded again to 41,007 hectares by virtue of Executive Order No. 67 issued by Governor Newton Gilbert on October 15, 1912.

The Bureau of Prisons was established on November 1, 1905 under the Reorganization Act of the Philippine Commission as an agency under the Department of Commerce and Police. The Reorganization Act also re-established the San Ramon Prison in 1907 which was destroyed during the Spanish–American War in 1898. The prison was placed under the Bureau of Prisons and receive prisoners in Mindanao.

The Correctional Institution for Women was founded on November 27, 1929, by virtue of Act No. 3579 as the first and only prison for women in the Philippines. Later, on January 21, 1932, the bureau opened the Davao Penal Colony in Southern Mindanao.

The New Bilibid Prison was established in 1935 in Muntinlupa due to the increased rate of prisoners.

=== Contemporary era ===
Proclamation No. 72 issued on September 26, 1954, established the Sablayan Prison and Penal Farm in Occidental Mindoro, and the Leyte Regional Prison was established on January 16, 1973, under Proclamation No. 1101.

The Administrative Code of 1987 and Proclamation No. 495, issued on November 22, 1989, changed the agency's name from Bureau of Prisons to "Bureau of Corrections".

President Benigno Aquino III signed into law on May 24, 2013, Republic Act no. 10575 or the Bureau of Corrections Act which enables the government to upgrade and professionalize the country's penal system.

During the administration of President Bongbong Marcos in the 2020s, a proposal has been made to merged the BuCor with the Bureau of Jail Management and Penology to align the Philippines' penal system with its Southeast Asian neighbors.

== Function ==
The Bureau of Corrections is an agency under the Department of Justice. It manages prisons in the Philippines such as the New Bilibid Prison. It shares roles with the Bureau of Jail Management and Penology (BJMP) which is under the Department of the Interior and Local Government although there are proposals to merge the two bodies.

The BuCor maintains the detention of inmates or what it calls "persons deprived of liberty" (PDLs) serving sentences more than three years of imprisonment. While the BJMP deals with convicts serving sentences less than three years or suspects awaiting trial.

== Prisons ==
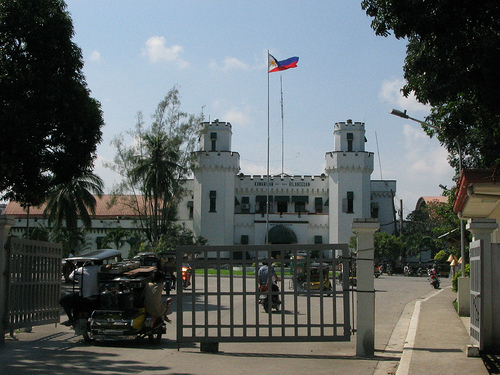
New Bilibid Prison; the NBP Reservation houses the BuCor headquarters

The Bureau of Corrections maintains seven prisons and penal farms across the Philippines:

Current facilities

- Correctional Institution for Women (CIW)
  - Main prison in Mandaluyong
  - CIW Mindanao in Santo Tomas, Davao del Norte
- New Bilibid Prison in Muntinlupa
- Sablayan Prison and Penal Farm in Occidental Mindoro
- Iwahig Prison and Penal Farm in Puerto Princesa City, Palawan
- Leyte Regional Prison in Abuyog, Leyte
- San Ramon Prison and Penal Farm in Zamboanga City
- Davao Prison and Penal Farm in Braulio E. Dujali, Davao del Norte

Former facilities

- Corregidor Prison Stockade (1908 until the outbreak of the World War II)
- Fort Bonifacio Prison in Makati (until the 1980s)
- Bontoc Prison in Mountain Province

Future facilities

- Regional Prison Facility in Palayan, Nueva Ecija. Groundbreaking in 2026.

== Organization ==
=== Director Generals ===
The Bureau of Corrections is managed by the Director General who is colloquially called as the chief of the organization.

List of Director Generals of the Bureau of Corrections
Name	Term
George Wolfe	1904 – 1910
M. L. Stewart	1910 – 1914
W.H. Dade	1914 – 1920
Julius W. Quillen	1920 – 1923
Ramon Victorio	1923 – 1930
Paulino Santos	1930 – 1937
Eriberto B. Misa Sr.	1937 – 1949
Eustaquio Balagtas	1949 – 1954
Alfredo Bunye	1954 – 1958
Enrique Fernandez	1958 – 1962
Jason Angeles	1962
Felix Amante	1962 – 1965
Dominador Danan	1965 – 1966
Alejo Santos	1967 – 1971
Vicente Raval	1971 – 1982
Catalino Macaraig Jr.	1979
Ramon Liwag	1982
Vicente Eduardo	1982 – 1986
Edralin Palacios	1986
Meliton Goyena	1986 – 1991
Cleto Senoren	1991
Eriberto Misa Jr.	1991 – 1993
Vicente Vinarao (first term)	1994 – 1998
Pedro Sistoza	1998 – 2001
Ricardo Macala	2001 – 2003
Dionisio Santiago	2003 – 2004
Vicente Vinarao (second term)	2004 – 2007
Ricardo Dapat	2007
Oscar Calderon	2007 – 2010
Ernesto Diokno	2010 – May 2011
Manuel Co (first term)	May – August 2011
Gaudencio Pangilinan Jr.	August 2011 – August 2012
Manuel Co (second term)	August – November 2012
Rafael Ragos	November 2012 – March 2013
Franklin Jesus Bucayu	March 2013 – 2015
Ricardo Rainier Cruz	2015 – June 2016
Rolando Asuncion (OIC)	June – November 2016
Benjamin Delos Santos	November 2016 – July 13, 2017
Valfrie Tabian (OIC)	July 14, 2017 – April 30, 2018
Ronald dela Rosa	April 30 – October 12, 2018
Nicanor Faeldon	November 21, 2018 – September 5, 2019
Melvin Ramon Buenafe (OIC)	September 6–20, 2019
Gerald Bantag	September 20, 2019 – October 21, 2022
Gregorio Pio Catapang	October 21, 2022 – present
Source: Bureau of Corrections

== Logo ==
The old Bureau of Corrections Logo

The logo of the bureau represents the government agency's mandate, the rehabilitation of inmate. The logo focuses on the man in prison as the main concern of rehabilitation. It presents man behind bars, but who looks outwards with the hope of rejoining the free community. The 7 rays of the sun represent the 7 operating prisons and penal farms who carry out the reformation programs of the bureau. The color green symbolizes hope. The color orange is symbolic of happiness. The bar of justice represents the Philippine justice system.
