= San Ramon Prison and Penal Farm =

Penal colony in Zamboanga City, Philippines

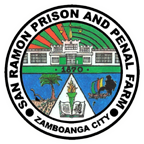
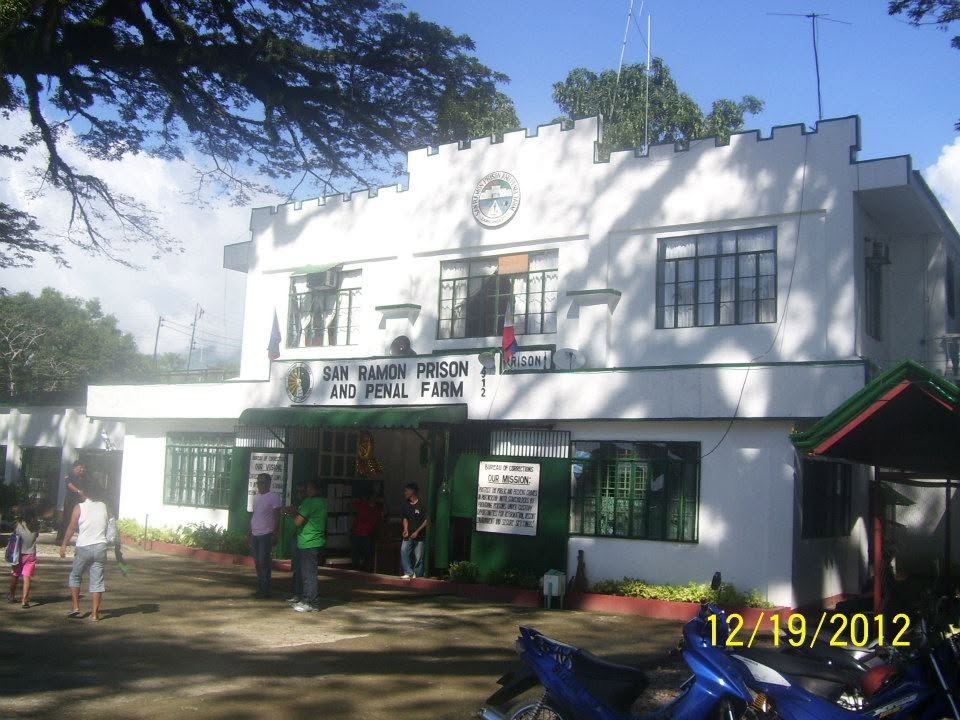
- The façade of the San Ramon Prison and Penal Farm in 2012
- Interactive map of San Ramon Prison and Penal Farm
- Location: San Ramon, Talisayan, Zamboanga City; 6°59′39.4692″N 121°55′21.8958″E
- Status: Operational
- Capacity: 1,236
- Population: 4,932 (2026)
- Opened: 1870
- Managed by: Bureau of Corrections

San Ramon Prison and Penal Farm is a penal colony situated in Sitio San Ramon, Barangay Talisayan in Zamboanga City in the Philippines.

== History ==
The San Ramon Prison and Penal Farm was established on August 31, 1870, through a royal decree promulgated in 1869. It is one of the oldest penal colonies established in the Philippines, and it serves criminals convicted with various crimes since then.

During the Spanish-American War in 1898, the prisoners in San Ramon were hastily released and the buildings destroyed. In 1907, the American administration re-established the prison farm. In 1912, John J. Pershing, chief executive of the Department of Mindanao and Sulu, classified the institution as a prison and penal colony and therein confined people sentenced by the courts under his jurisdiction.

Through the years, it experienced reduction in its overall land area through the emergence of other government agencies within the vicinity, such as the Philippine Cocount Authority - Zamboanga Research Center and Western Mindanao State University - College of Agriculture.

== Facilities ==
San Ramon Prison and Penal Farm is a penal colony situated in sitio San Ramon, Barangay Talisayan, Zamboanga City. It currently houses persons deprived of liberty or PDLs in the Western Mindanao region and transferees from the New Bilibid Prisons in Muntinlupa. As of January 31, 2026, San Ramon Prison and Penal Farm occupies a land area of 1,925.68 ha (7.44 sq mi)1,925.68 hectares of land, with the capacity of 1,236 PDLs. It has the PDL population of 4,932 PDLs as of January 31, 2026.

Proclamation No. 112 of 2001 mandates the expansion of the San Ramon Prison and Penal Farm's land area to Upper Bungiao and Upper Curuan within Zamboanga City, as part of its relocation site.
