= Leyte Regional Prison =

Prison in Abuyog, Leyte, Philippines

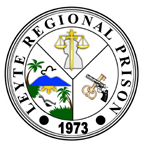
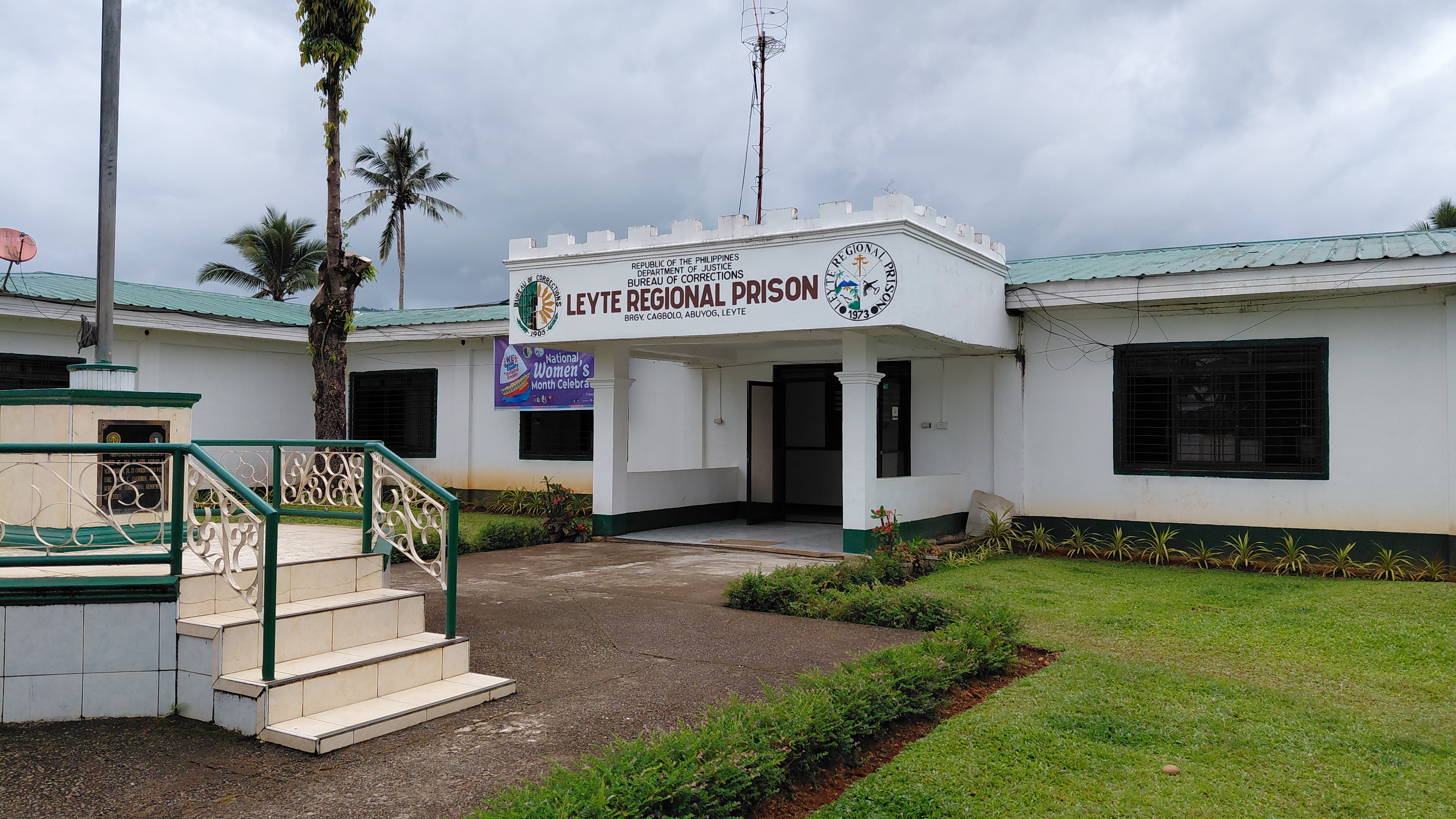
- The façade of the Leyte Regional Prison
- Interactive map of Leyte Regional Prison
- Location: Cagbolo, Abuyog, Leyte; 10°39′06.9″N 125°02′56.3″E
- Status: Operational
- Capacity: 500
- Population: 679 (2023)
- Opened: 1973
- Managed by: Bureau of Corrections

The Leyte Regional Prison (LRP) is a penal colony in Abuyog, Leyte managed by the Bureau of Corrections.

== History ==
The Leyte Regional Prison was established a year after President Ferdinand Marcos declared martial law in the Philippines. It was formed on January 16, 1973, under Presidential Decree No. 110.

A fire hit one building of the prison compound in October 2015, killing ten inmates.

== Facilities ==
The Leyte Regional Prison is a penal colony in the barangay of Cagbolo in Abuyog, Leyte. As of May 2023, the Leyte Regional Prison occupies a 861 hectares (2,130 acres) of land with a capacity of 679 inmates. The facility has 2,504 inmates. It houses mostly inmates from the Eastern Visayas and transferees from the New Bilibid Prison in Muntinlupa.

Some inmates also takes senior high school studies through the alternate learning system since 2018. There are plans to build a school within the prison compound.
