= Rodrigo Gularte =

Brazilian criminal (1972–2015)

Rodrigo Muxfeldt Gularte
- Born: 13 July 1972; Foz do Iguaçu, Paraná, Brazil
- Died: 29 April 2015 (aged 42); Nusa Kambangan, Central Java, Indonesia
- Cause of death: Execution by firing squad
- Known for: Drug trafficking
- Conviction: Drug trafficking (2005)
- Penalty: Death penalty

Rodrigo Muxfeldt Gularte (13 July 1972 – 29 April 2015) was a Brazilian citizen who was executed in Indonesia by firing squad for drug trafficking.

Gularte was diagnosed with schizophrenia and bipolar disorder. According to news reports, he did not realise he was going to die until minutes before his execution.

== Early life ==
Rodrigo Gularte was born into a wealthy family in the southern Brazilian city of Foz do Iguaçu, Paraná. He was a keen surfer and relatives remember him as a tall, gentle, polite and kind young boy who slipped into depression, and became involved in drugs after his parents divorced when he was 13.

His first treatment for drug addiction was at 16, when relatives say they had noticed signs of bipolarity. Other treatments would ensue, without success, and Gularte developed depression coupled with the use of drugs. His mother Clarisse tried to help him with work. Gularte gained, for example, a restaurant to administer, paid by his mother. He also had a son with autism, born when he was 21, Jimmy Gularte, with whom he had little contact. But his contact with drugs of all kinds, continued. During his 20s, he travelled through Latin America with friends, drinking and taking various kinds of drugs.

Sponsored by his mother, Gularte traveled through Latin America to the United States, Africa and Europe - consuming all kinds of drugs. "I thought these trips would do him well, he would wind down, get rid of bad influences," says his mother Clarisse. The result was the opposite. Increasing his addiction, Gularte returned in 1994 to Curitiba. At 24, without work or study, nocturnal, Gularte was involved in a serious traffic accident after leaving a party, drunk and drugged. To avoid his arrest, Mrs. Clarisse admitted her son to rehab. After six months of detoxification, in 1996, Gularte tried to change his life. He became an entrepreneur, but two restaurants of his failed. In 1999, he passed the entrance exam to liberal arts at the Federal University of Santa Catarina. In the middle of the course, he dropped out. He then returned to travelling through Europe and Latin America bringing in various types of cannabis. In 2004, the opportunity arose to take the surfboards stuffed with cocaine to Indonesia.

== Arrest ==
In the late 1990s and early 2000s, Bali was an international destination for young travellers attracted by a surf culture and electronic dance music parties where cocaine and ecstasy were available at clubs, as was marijuana, supplied by Italian and Brazilian drug traffickers who often used young surfers as mules. Gularte lived in Florianópolis since 1999 when he was arrested in August 2004 with 6 kg of cocaine hidden in surfboards. The arrest, along with two other men who lived in the capital, took place at Jakarta airport in Indonesia. The trio was caught with eight boards stuffed with six kilogrammes of cocaine, but Gularte took sole responsibility for the transportation of narcotics.

== Conviction and imprisonment ==
Gularte was sentenced to death on 7 February 2005 by the Indonesian government. During his early period in prison, Gularte shared a cell with fellow Brazilian convict Marco Archer Moreira.

After his conviction, Gularte tried to commit suicide in prison in 2006. His mental health was worsening and a diagnosis of paranoid schizophrenia with delusions and hallucinations was detected. There was a recommendation that he should be transferred to a psychiatric hospital. However Indonesian authorities did not allow his transfer since the experts were hired by the defense. The Gularte family tried, without success, to obtain clemency for him by saying doctors have diagnosed him as paranoid schizophrenic, which would normally allow him to be transferred to a psychiatric facility. The Brazilian government called for him to be spared the death penalty for humanitarian reasons.

== Execution ==
Gularte was executed in Indonesia on 29 April 2015 at Nusa Kambangan, Central Java, Indonesia. He had been sentenced to death for drug trafficking, and the sentence was executed by a firing squad. According to his lawyer, Gularte did not know he would be shot. Roman Catholic priest Charlie Burrows was with Gularte minutes before the execution, at the request of the family and the condemned. Before his death, Gularte received spiritual comfort and the last rites of the Catholic Church.

Gularte's body was taken to Saint Carolus Hospital in Jakarta. Gularte's photo, and a cross with his name and the dates of his birth and death were beside the coffin. His body was transported to Brazil, where he was buried at the request of Gularte. A day after Gularte's death, a Mass was held for him.

Rodrigo Gularte's body was concealed and buried in Curitiba, Paraná, on 3 May 2015, after which Mass was said for him.

=== Reactions ===
According to the Brazilian government, Gularte's death is a "serious event" in relations between Brazil and Indonesia. The note says that Brazil will work in international human rights bodies for the abolition of the death penalty.

A government's statement against death penalty applied by Indonesia was read by the Secretary General of Foreign Affairs, Sérgio Danese, during an interview given at Itamaraty.

The Secretary-General of the United Nations, Ban Ki-moon expressed "deep regret" for the execution of eight convicted of drug trafficking in Indonesia, including Rodrigo Gularte. Ki-moon expressed deep regret at the executions carried out in Indonesia, despite numerous requests in the country and internationally to interrupt it.

== See also ==
- Marco Archer Moreira
