= Iwahig Prison and Penal Farm =

Prison in Palawan, Philippines

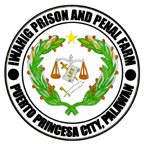
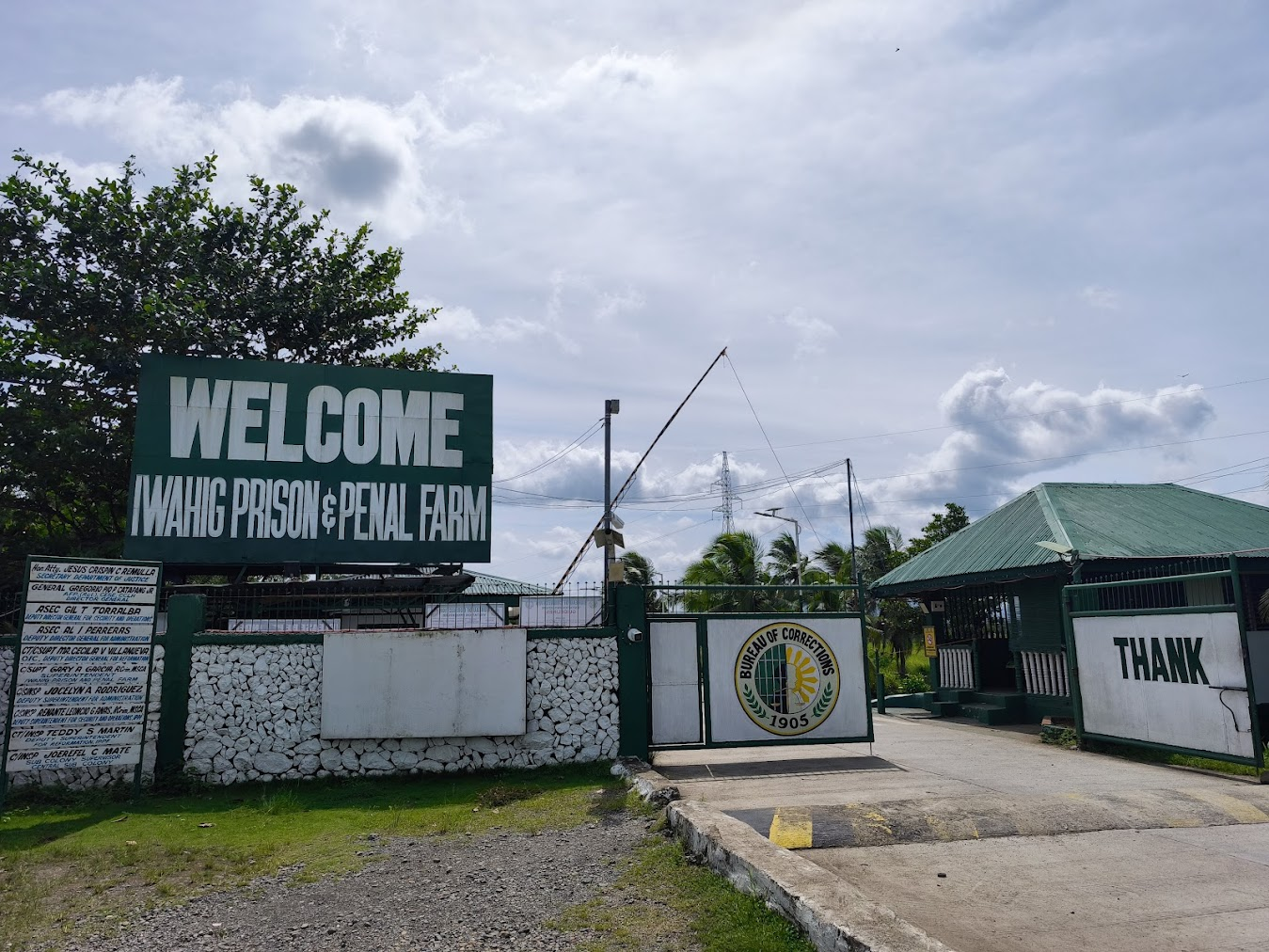
- Iwahig Prison and Penal Farm, November 2025

- Location within Palawan Location within Philippines
- Location: Puerto Princesa, Palawan, Philippines; 9°44′37″N 118°39′40″E
- Managed by: Bureau of Corrections

Iwahig Prison and Penal Farm in Puerto Princesa, Palawan, Philippines is one of seven operating units of the Bureau of Corrections under the Department of Justice. Currently, it houses some 4,000 inmates.

== History ==
=== American territorial period ===
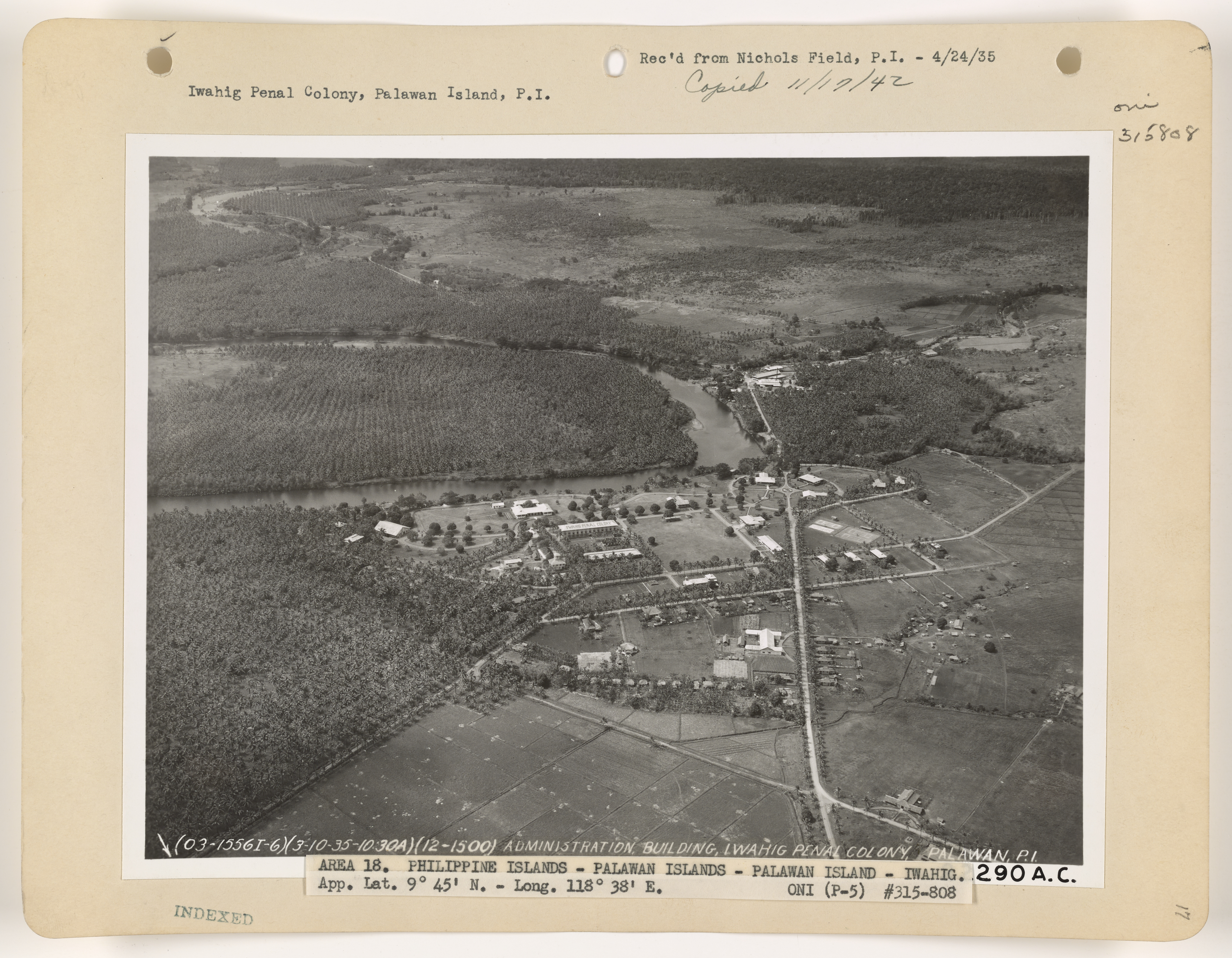
Aerial view of Iwahig Penal Colony, 1935

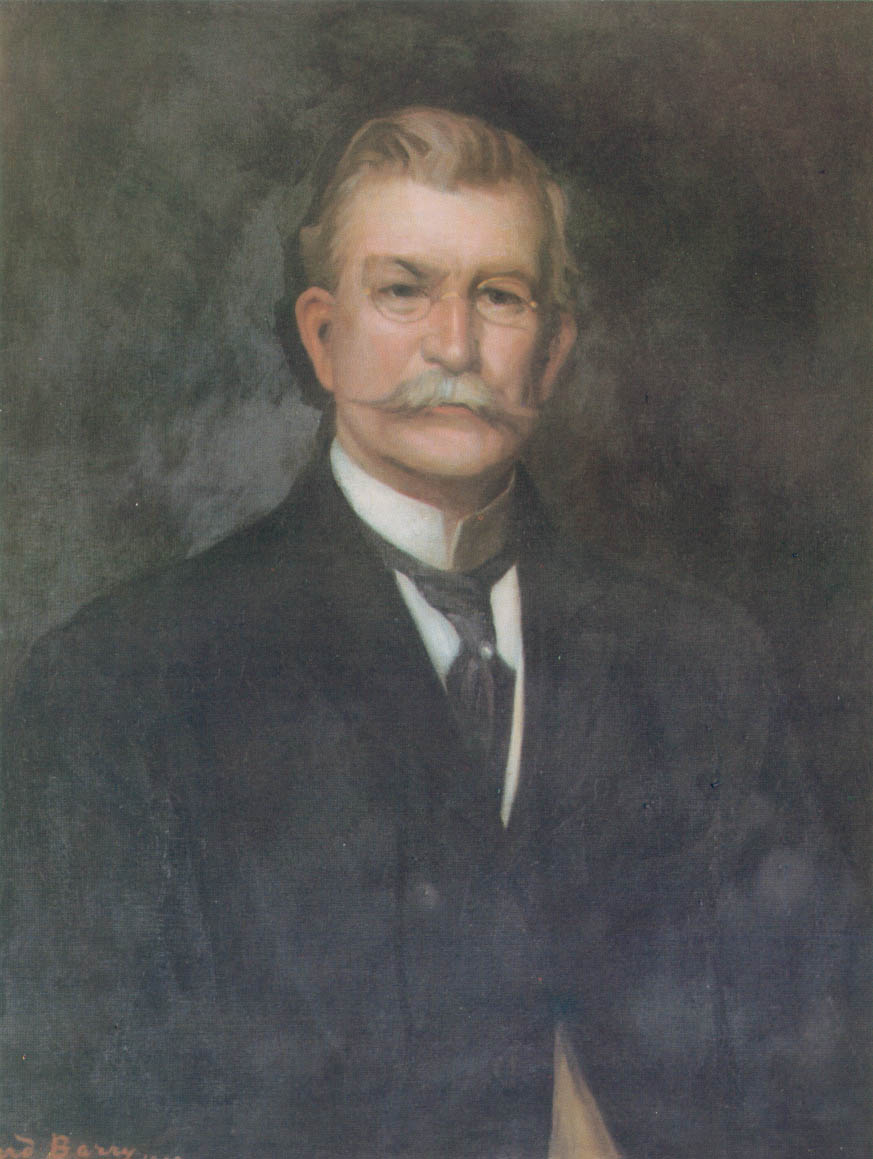
Luke Edward Wright, Governor General of the Philippines from February 1904 to March 1906

The Spanish regime had earlier designated Puerto Princesa, Palawan as a place where offenders sentenced to banishment were exiled, often as a death sentence due to the endemic malaria. Yet, the facility was established only during the American occupation. Governor Luke Wright authorized the establishment of a penal colony in the province of Palawan on November 16, 1904. This penal settlement, which originally comprised an area of 22 acres, served as a depository for prisoners who could not be accommodated at the Bilibid Prison in Manila. A prison facility was created by the American military in the rain forest of Puerto Princesa. Lieutenant George Wolfe, a member of the U.S. expeditionary force, was the prison's first superintendent.

William Cameron Forbes, in his capacity as Secretary of Commerce and Police (1904–1909), conceived of the Palawan penal colony following the model of the George Junior Republic. According to Forbes, "The plan is to give these prisoners an opportunity to cultivate little lots of land for good conduct and industry." Three classes of colonists were established, the lowest being the newly arrived convicts, followed by a middle class living in the Home Zone on a two-hectare plot where they could build a house and live with their family, and finally the top class living in the Free Zone, also with 2 hectares of land. The first group of 61 convicts arrived in Nov. 1904, with the population reaching 313 prisoners in June 1905, and 446 in June 1908, plus 20 families.

Major John R. White, of the Philippine Constabulary, became superintendent in Sept. 1906. Forbes directed White to establish a "form of self-government in the colony." Under White's rule, the mortality rate due to disease dropped, as the land was drained and sanitation improved. Barracks, an administration building and parade ground were built, while cash crops and coconut trees were planted. The work squads were controlled with a system consisting of a foreman and assistant foremen. By the time he departed in Sept. 1908, White stated the 500 convicts lived under "moral constraints" and "interior discipline maintained without guards." Carroll H. Lamb took over as superintendent, and during his 3 year tenure, self-government was established. In 1909, Justice of the Peace Courts and a Court of Last Resort were established, and by 1910, the top class of colonists could elect minor officials, police and petty officers. By 1911, with a population over 1,000, Forbes stated "the colonists were allowed to govern themselves – elect their own president and council, or legislature, from among the men who by good conduct and industry had earned promotion to the highest grades."

The Philippine Commission of the United States government passed Act No. 1723 in 1907, classifying the settlement as a penal institution. Prison escape attempts were an initial problem the colony experienced during its first 2 year, including 33 escapees on 20 Sept. 1905. Yet, through White's efforts, the settlement became a successful colony. Vocational activities included farming, fishing, forestry, and carpentry, from which the prisoners were free to choose.

=== Japanese occupation ===
Pedro Paje was the Iwahig Penal Colony Superintendent during the Japanese occupation. The colony had about 1,700 prisoners and 45 guards and employees during World War II. At the same time, Paje led a secret Palawan Underground Force, which established communications with Palawan's guerrilla network, supplying them with food and medicine. Paje also kept tabs on the American POWs being held in Puerto Princesa. President Manuel Quezon had authorized Paje use of the prison colony inmates to carry out acts of sabotage and intelligence against the Japanese. As cover, Paje played the role of a Japanese collaborator.

=== Land distribution ===
In 1955, President Ramon Magsaysay promulgated Administrative Order No. 20 which allowed the distribution of colony lands for cultivation by deserving colonists. This was implemented by the Secretary of Justice Pedro T. Tuazon. and Agriculture and Natural Resources Secretary Juan G. Rodriguez, who granted qualified colonist 6 ha (15 acres) of land.

President Carlos P. Garcia created a committee on August 16, 1959 to study the state of national prisons. The prisoners in Iwahig were divided into two groups, settlers and colonists. The settlers were prisoners whose applications for land to cultivate had been approved. Tools, dwellings and pack animals were furnished by the government. Expenditures incurred for their maintenance and for their families were reimbursed from the products of their farms. Settlers received any amount of money they had loaned after the government deducted their obligations.

During that time, Iwahig was subdivided into four zones or districts: Central sub-colony with an area of 14,700 hectares (36,000 acres); Sta. Lucia with 9,685 hectares (23,930 acres); Montible with 8,000 hectares (20,000 acres) and Inagawan with 13,000 hectares (32,000 acres).

== In popular culture ==
The Iwahig Prison is the subject of the film, Out of Bounds, by the French directors Alexandre Leborgne and Pierre Barougier, France, 2005. The film received the Grand Prix in 2006 at the EBS International Documentary Festival held by the South Korean broadcaster EBS. Australian comedy duo Hamish & Andy visited the Prison for their show Hamish & Andy's Gap Year Asia.
