= Correctional Institution for Women (Mandaluyong) =

Women's prison in Metro Manila, Philippines

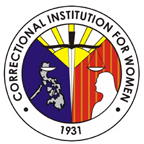
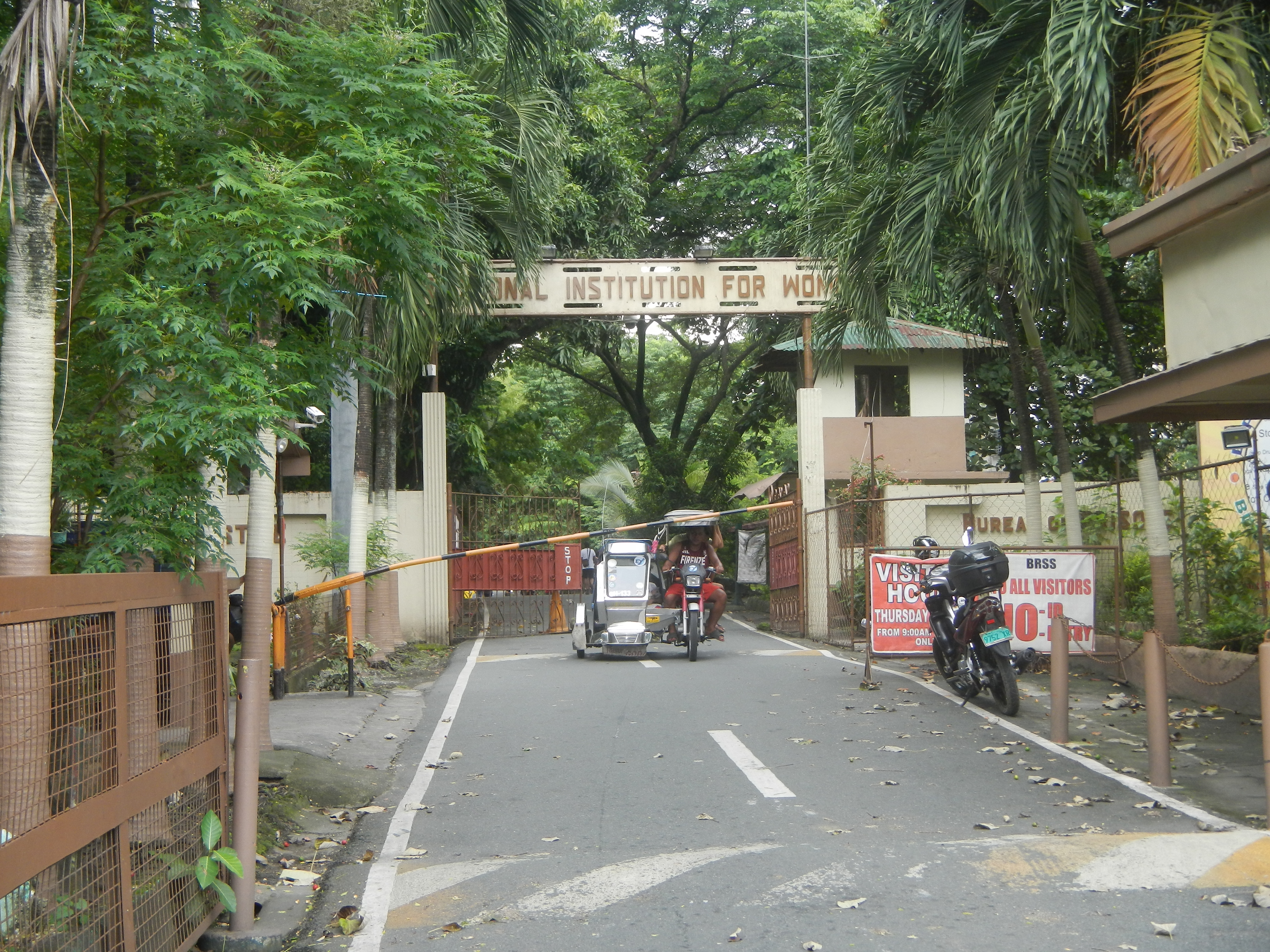
- Gate in 2018

- Location within Metro Manila Location within Luzon Location within Philippines
- Location: Mandaluyong, Philippines; 14°34′55″N 121°02′18″E
- Status: Operational
- Capacity: 2,925
- Population: 3,196 (May 2019)
- Opened: 1929
- Managed by: Bureau of Corrections

The Correctional Institution for Women (CIW) is a women's prison located on F. Martinez Avenue, Mauway, Mandaluyong, Metro Manila, Philippines. The prison is operated by the Bureau of Corrections.

== History ==
The prison first opened on a 18-hectare (44-acre) property on February 14, 1931. Previously, women inmates used to be held at the Old Bilibid Prison.

When the Philippines used to execute death penalty convicts, female inmates condemned to death were held at CIW. Ron Gluckman of Asiaweek described the women's death row as appearing like a secondary school.

== Capacity ==
In January 2023, its population of inmates, at 3,297, exceeded the capacity, which was only 1,008.

== Planned closure ==
Before 2028, the now 15-hectare CIW will be closed and moved to a facility outside of Metro Manila, Gregorio Catapang Jr. announced on May 14, 2023.

== Facilities ==
The Correctional Institution for Women has three different camps namely the Maximum Security Compound which consists of the Old and New Building, the Medium Security Camp and Minimum Security Camp.
