= Si Ouey =

Thai serial killer

- Undated photo of Si Ouey
- Born: Huang Lihui c. 1927; Shantou, Guangdong, China
- Died: 16 September 1959 (aged 31); Bang Kwang Central Prison, Nonthaburi province, Thailand
- Cause of death: Execution by gunfire
- Resting place: Wat Bang Phraek Tai Temple
- Other names: Si Quey; Si Uey Sae-Ung
- Occupation: Gardener
- Status: Executed (16 September 1959; 67 years ago)
- Convictions: Murder (Guilt highly disputed.)
- Penalty: Death

Details
- Date apprehended: 28 January 1958

Si Ouey or Si Uey Sae-Ung (Thai: ซีอุย แซ่อึ้ง, RTGS: Si-ui Sae-Ueng, Thai pronunciation: [sīː.ūj sɛ̂ː.ɯ̂ŋ]), commonly spelled Si Quey and whose actual name was Huang Lihui (Chinese: 黃利輝; pinyin: Huáng Lìhuī), was a Sino-Thai gardener who became best known as a convicted serial killer. Si Ouey was accused of killing several children throughout the 1950s before being arrested in 1958 and executed in 1959. According to some sources, Si Ouey was allegedly the first serial killer in the history of modern Thailand. Many believe him to be innocent of the charges and a victim of anti-Chinese sentiment in 20th-century Thailand.

== Biography ==
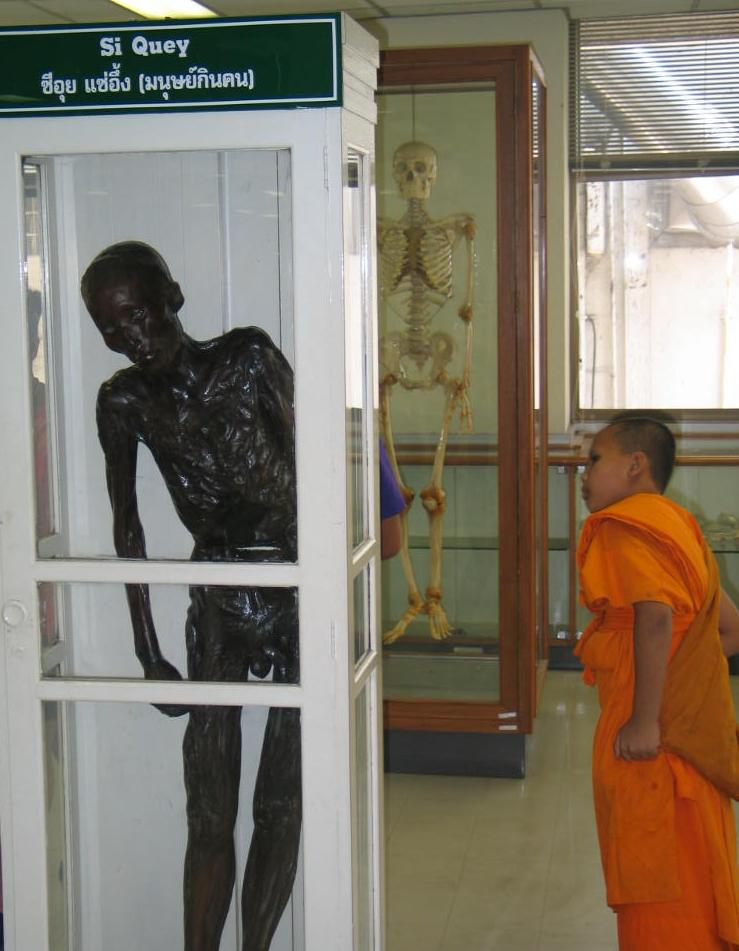
A novice monk viewing Si Ouey's body as it was displayed at the Siriraj Medical Museum in 2006. It was taken down in 2019 due to discussion about his possible innocence.

Much of Si Ouey's history is unknown; the Thai Department of Corrections was never contacted by a family member, and as of 2020 Si Ouey was considered stateless. Most information about his early life is sourced from his interrogation.

According to the newspaper Thairath, Si Ouey was born in 1927 to a Teochew family of poor farmers in Huilai County, Shantou Prefecture. The given names of his father and mother were transcribed as Hun Ho (Thai: ฮุ้นฮ้อ) and Bai Ding (Thai: ไป่ติ๋ง). He was reportedly neglected as a child by his parents and abused by his peers, leaving his home and travelling around as a nomad.

There are several rumours surrounding Si Ouey's life before his arrival in Thailand. It's said that as a young teenager, he encountered a Buddhist monk who told him to eat human livers and hearts, claiming it would improve his physical strength to protect himself. Si Ouey heeded the advice, but initially only killed animals to eat their raw organs. Upon turning 18, he was drafted into the "8th Infantry Battallion" (Thai: หน่วยรบทหารราบกองพันที่ 8) to fight in the Second Sino-Japanese War. It's alleged that during an encirclement by the Imperial Japanese Army, Si Ouey engaged in cannibalism during a food shortage by removing the hearts, livers, and intestines of his dead fellow soldiers before boiling and eating them. Today, it is generally agreed that the cannibalism accusations against Si Ouey were false.

At the end of the war a few months later, Si Ouey returned to Shantou, but he left again to escape poverty. He illegally immigrated to Thailand by stowing away on a freighter, arriving at Bangkok Port on 28 December 1946. With some fellow passengers, he stayed at a hotel in Phra Nakhon district before leaving for Thap Sakae district in Prachuap Khiri Khan province, where he lived for the next eight years. He resided in Thap Sakae subdistrict, sharing a space with several other Chinese immigrants in a small alley in the central area, later nicknamed "Si Ouey Alley". As Si Ouey did not speak Thai, he mainly sought employment by Chinese speakers, usually as a farmhand for cassava and coconut farms, but also as a general labourer and a tofu factory worker. Oral tradition in areas where Si Ouey lived described him as a gentle and kind man who feared strangers but was always willing to help others. A former co-worker, Ik-Liang Sae-Jiew, stated that Si Ouey treated him and other labourers like family.

== Murders ==
From 1954 to 1958, Si Ouey was accused of killing several (sources disagree on whether four, five, or six) children, in Bangkok, Nakhon Pathom, and Rayong, allegedly disembowelling, boiling, and eating his victims.

The earliest incident tied to Si Ouey occurred on 8 April 1954 in Thap Sakae district, where he abducted Bang-orn Phamorrasut as she was on her way to buy iced coffee from the marketplace. She was dragged from the path to a bamboo thicket behind a rice mill, strangled into unconsciousness and stabbed in the throat before a passerby scared her assailant off. Bang-orn survived with a scar to the neck and was still alive as of 2019. According to her younger brother, Bang-orn did not identify Si Ouey as her attacker, whom she named as a man named Kliang.

The first murder took place on 10 May 1954, when Nid Sae-Phu was kidnapped during a wedding banquet for a local official at the Thap Sakae subdistrict administrative office. Nid had walked from the main venue to attend a movie screening when she disappeared, last being seen carried away by a man. Her mutilated body was later found near the railway tracks. According to the official account, Si Ouey took Nid to a canal behind the Thap Sakae railway station, where she was killed with a stab wound to the neck. Afterwards, Nid's body was carried to a railroad bridge 3 kilometres (1.9 mi) away, where Si Ouey allegedly cut open her torso and removed her heart and liver, which he put into his pockets before leaving and eating the organs at home. However, local residents and Nid's older brother suspected, based on eyewitness statements, that the true killer was Kliang, a local man.

On 20 June 1954, Lim Hiang Sae-Lao was found dead just outside of Thap Sakae Sub-district. Her body was left 1 kilometre (3,300 ft) from the coconut plantation of I-Kok Sae-jiu, where Si Ouey was working at the time. Investigative officer Prachuab Chaladpaet confirmed that two men were arrested for Lim Hiang's murder and sentenced to 20 and 30 years imprisonment respectively.

On 27 October 1954, Kam-ngan Sae-Lee was murdered in Sam Roi Yot subdistrict, Pran Buri district. Kam-ngan was walking home alone after parting ways with an older girl following a trip to the cinema. Police believe that a man lured her with sweets before slashing her throat. Si Ouey was employed near the scene of the crime. Kam-ngan's parents remained certain that Si Ouey was their daughter's murderer.

On 28 November 1954, Li Ju Sae-Tang, a resident of Dusit district, Bangkok, was found dead on the railways in Phra Nakhon district, having been mutilated and cut open. Si Ouey had moved to Bangkok a month earlier. However, a different man later confessed to cannibalising Li Ju.

On 5 February 1957, Xiu Ju Sae-Tang, a resident of Mueang Nakhon Pathom district, Nakhon Pathom province, was found dead in a cave tunnel near Phra Pathommachedi. There were no known links to Si Ouey, with a 17-year-old pig butcher being arrested in the case. The suspect was released after another man confessed to Xiu Ju's murder.

The last murder took place on 27 January 1958, when 8-year-old Somboon Boonyakan went missing from Noen Phra tambon, part of Mueang Rayong district, Rayong province. He had left home with his brother Nawi in preparation for Somboon's kon chuk ceremony, looking to buy vegetables at a farm where Si Ouey had gained employment as a gardener. It was noted that this was the only instance in which a boy was targeted.

=== Arrest ===
An overnight search was started to look for Somboon. Eventually, Somboon's father Nawa found Si Ouey, apparently preparing a wood pile to burn. Nawa first went to ask Si Ouey about his son before seeing a human leg in the wood pile, after which Nawa and his companions beat and restrained Si Ouey until police arrived. According to Nawi Boonyakan, Somboon's body had been mutilated and placed on two logs, partially covered by cogon grass. Si Ouey had been caught carrying a cleaver and was reportedly in the process of cutting grass to add to the pile, though no fire had been lit yet.

== Legal process and execution ==
Si Ouey was held in custody for nine days before confessing to police. According to Si Ouey, he lured Somboon into his house with the promise of showing him a bird's nest, knocking him out from behind by punching the boy in the back of the head. Si Ouey stated that he tied up the unconscious Somboon and hung him upside down from the ceiling before stabbing him in the abdomen. Afterwards, he washed Somboon's body and cut out his organs, which he prepared inside, disposing of the intestines while cutting up the liver and heart.

Physical evidence was seized at Si Ouey's house, including a knife, a bloodied handkerchief, a red cloth, a heart, and a liver, the latter two inside a food cabinet. The handkerchief and cloth were confirmed to have Somboon's blood, while the quantity on the knife was too insufficient for testing. The two organs were examined, with medical staff stating that they appeared to be of human origin.

In a sworn statement, Si Ouey admitted to involvement in seven murders in total, reportedly having been promised repatriation to China in exchange. Si Ouey stated that he targeted children as they were easier to lure. He also allegedly admitted to enjoying the taste of human flesh but later denied being a cannibal.

Si Ouey was tried by the Court of First Instance, which sentenced him to death. However, the sentence was automatically reduced to life imprisonment due to his confession being counted as mitigating. The Court of Appeals reversed the reduction and reimposed the death sentence, with no chance for commutation. The Supreme Court of Thailand affirmed the decision. On 16 September 1959, Si Ouey was executed by firing squad at Bang Kwang Prison.

Due to the cannibalistic nature of the crimes, there was interest by the medical community into whether Si Ouey had any noticeable brain abnormalities. As the body went unclaimed, Si Ouey's remains were preserved and used for medical testing. As a result, Si Ouey was post-humously honoured as "Ajarn Yai" (Thai: อาจารย์ใหญ่, lit. 'Great Teacher'), as is customary for medical cadavers. He was then embalmed and put on display at Siriraj Medical Museum in Bangkok.

== Legacy ==
The case generated significant press coverage following Si Ouey's confession. For the following decades, Si Ouey was commonly invoked as a bogeyman-like figure to scare children into behaving.

Since the 2010s, many have called into question his confession and trial. Several note that Si Ouey spoke no Thai and as such may not have given an accurate confession, and that he was forced to use a translator during his trial. Anti-Chinese, anti-communism, and anti-immigrant sentiment may have also played a role in Si Ouey's trial. A campaign by humanitarian activists successfully campaigned for Si Ouey's corpse to be removed from display in August 2019, and in July 2020, his remains were cremated at Wat Bang Phraek Tai temple in Nonthaburi province. The ceremony was attended by residents of Thap Sakae Subdistrict, who had maintained Si Ouey's innocence, and a film crew who were producing a movie based on Si Ouey's life.

== See also ==
- List of serial killers by country
