= Bangkok Haunts =

2007 novel by John Burdett

- First edition (publ. Knopf)
- Author: John Burdett
- Publisher: Alfred A. Knopf
- Publication date: June 5, 2007
- ISBN: 978-0-307-26318-6

Bangkok Haunts is a 2007 novel by English novelist John Burdett.

== Plot ==
Detective Sonchai, of the Royal Thai Police, is a former accessory to murder and a former Buddhist monk. A video is mailed to him anonymously. It is a snuff film of Damrong, a woman he once loved obsessively. It turns out Damrong has masterminded her own death, and the recording of it, with proceeds going to her brother, a Buddhist monk.

== Themes ==
Revenge is one of the novel's themes. Damrong takes revenge on her father by informing the police about one of her father's burglaries. The police in the countryside orchestrate her father's death, via the "elephant game" (the victim is placed into a spherical cage, of a type that elephants tend to start kicking, and thereafter stomp on when the sphere gets wedged into the corner of the arena). Damrong has prepared for her father's murder by bringing a camera with an expensive zoom, so that she can take detailed pictures of the execution.

== Inspiration for the novel ==
In the novel's afterword, the author acknowledges inspiration from the following sources:

- The Damage Done, by Warren Fellows
- Corruption & Democracy in Thailand, by Pasuk Phongpaichit
- The Dhammapada, edited by Narada Thera
- The Funeral Casino, by Alan Klima
- Guns, Girls, Gambling and Ganja, by Sungsidh Piriyarangsan and Nualonoi Treerat
- The Sandhinirmochana Sutra, as translated by Thomas Cleary (Buddhist Yoga)
- Very Thai, by Philip Cornwel-Smith
- Welcome to Hell: One Man's Fight for Life Inside the Bangkok Hilton by Colin Martin
- Welcome to the Bangkok Slaughterhouse, by Father Joe Maier
- Bangkok Post, newspaper
- Kum Chat Luk, a Thai daily newspaper
