= Prison Fight =

Rehabilitation program for inmates through combat sports

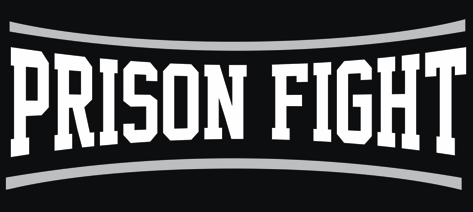
- Founded: 2012; 14 years ago
- Purpose: Rehabilitation of inmates
- Headquarters: Bangkok, Thailand
- Location: Klongpai Central Prison
- Key people: Kirill Sokur; Aree Chaloisuk; Thai Department of Corrections
- Website: www.prisonfight.com

Prison Fight is a controversial rehabilitation program for inmates through combat sports organized in partnership with the Thai Department of Corrections, an agency of the Thai Ministry of Justice. The program gives Thai prisoners who are incarcerated former fighters the opportunity to take on foreign fighters in exchange for sentence reduction and even gain their freedom if they win. If the inmates win sufficient amounts of fights against foreigners and have good behaviours, the Department of Corrections can reduce their sentences or even grant them a Royal pardon. Prison Fight holds events inside various maximum security prisons in Thailand and provides inmates with money and equipment to prepare them to reintegrate society. Convicts can engage in Muay Thai and Boxing matches in exchange for an early release.

The program was featured in notable media outlets such as Esquire, TIME, Huffington Post, New York Post, Al Jazeera, The Telegraph, Vice, Die Zeit, Men's Journal and Bangkok Post.

== Mission ==
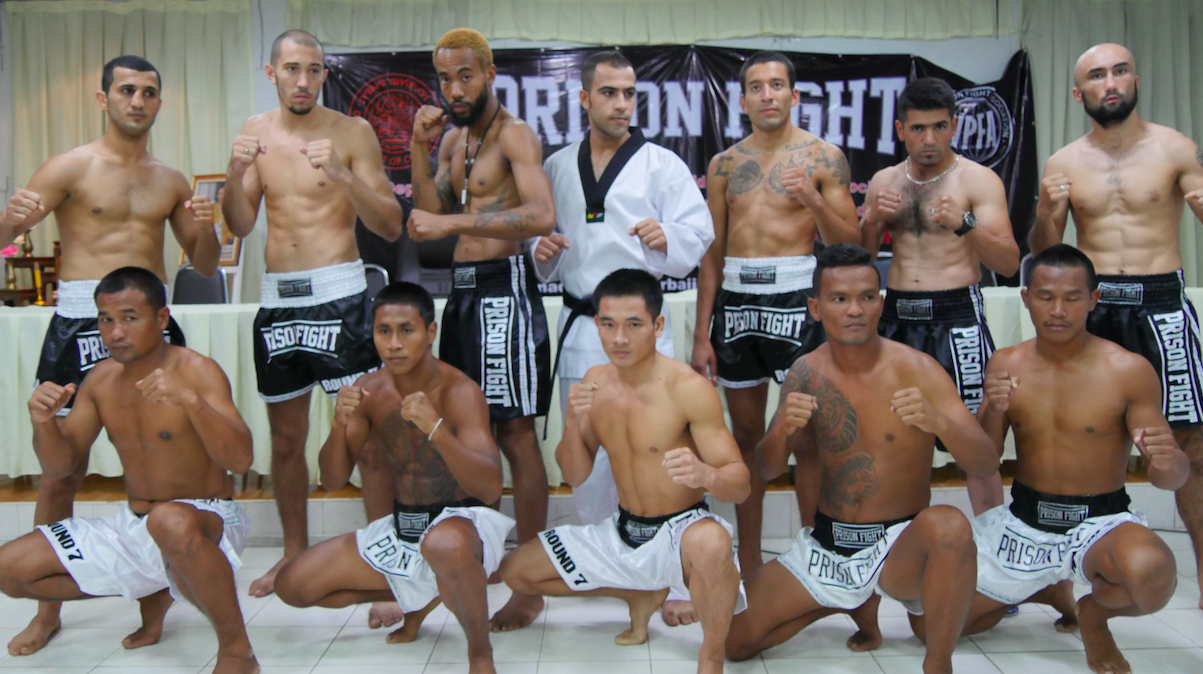
The press conference for Prison Fight: Fight For Freedom held at Klong Pai Prison in 2014

Since its foundation, Prison Fight gained widespread attention for its controversial concept where violent inmates can reduce their sentences and even earn their freedom by winning a series of Muay Thai fights against foreign fighters.

The ultimate aim of the Thai Department of Corrections through the Prison Fight events, is the implementation of a rehabilitation program to promote sport and good health among prisoners. Development of sports inside prisons walls is believed to minimize internal problems such as diseases, drug abuse and violent behaviour.

== History ==
The Thai Penal System has a long history of organizing sporting events, from soccer and basketball tournaments to weightlifting competitions. In an effort to modernize the penal system, Thai authorities began issuing sentence reductions to the athletes viewed as bringing honor to their country. In the 1980s, Thai Department of Corrections introduced a program called Sports Behind Bars. This gave birth to the Thai tradition of pardoning outstanding fighters. Muay Thai was one of the first activities offered.

Since then, only a handful of prisoners have managed to parlay their skill into an early release. In 2007, the imprisoned drug dealer Siriporn Taweesuk beat a Japanese boxer for the World Boxing Council light-flyweight title in a match held at Klong Prem Prison. Not long afterward, she was released, having achieved, in the words of one Thai official, "glory for Thailand." That same year, Amnat Ruenroeng, a Muay Thai veteran and convicted robber serving 15 years at Bangkok's Thonburi prison, was pardoned after winning a national title in boxing. He subsequently qualified to represent Thailand at the 2008 Summer Olympics in Beijing.

=== Creation ===
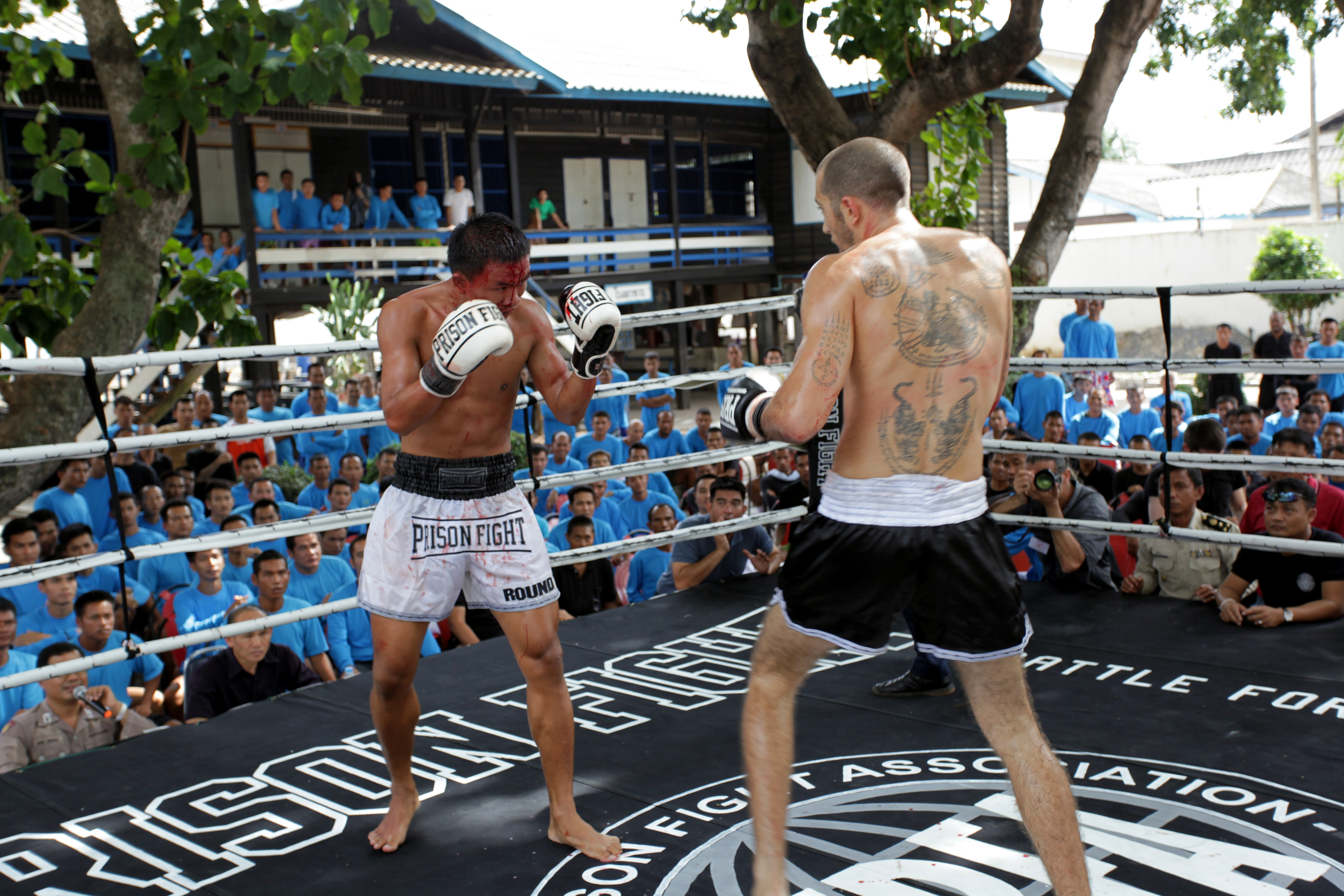
Dave Leduc vs Thai Inmate at Prison Fight Thailand 2014

Prison Fight is the brain-child of an international team of proponents of rehabilitation via martial arts, notably Aree Chaloisuk, former director of the Klongpai Central Prison, in Nakhon Ratchasima, two hours north of Bangkok. All Prison Fight events were held at Klongpai Central Prison, with the exception of the fourth event who was held at Klong Prem Central Prison. In past events, Thai inmate Chalernpol Sawangsuk who was incarcerated for murder was released shortly after his victory over British Muay Thai fighter Arran Burton.

One of the main reasons the Prison Fight program has captivated the worldwide media is the slogan: "Battle for Freedom". Many believed the fights were organized as a way for prisoners to fight and secure a pardon or sentence reduction, but it appears to be much more than that. Nowadays, Prison Fight established stricter rules for the inmates wishing to participate in the program. They are expected to display exemplary behavior and personal development along with their fighting skills. When it comes to fighting convicts, former notable competitor Dave Leduc said to Bangkok Post : "They deserve to get my 100%," adding, "If he wins, then he earns it."

=== Television ===
In 2013, in early stage of the program, Vice Fightland made a heavily shared short video on YouTube that made the world aware of the Prison Fight program in Thailand.

In 2016, the Prison Fight program was the subject of a short documentary, titled Prison Fight, set in both Canada and Thailand. The film tells the story of Sean McNabb fighting Komkit Agorn Ketnawk at Klongpai Central Prison. Two men from opposite ends of the world with only one thing in common, the art of Muay Thai.

In 2017, Prison Fight was featured in the Showtime documentary Prison fighters : 5 Rounds To Freedom. The film is narrated by Sons of Anarchy star Ron Perlman and aims at examining a controversial practice in Thailand’s criminal justice system. The documentary follows a convicted murderer through redemption. He is granted a Thai Royal pardon after winning a final Muay Thai match against an American fighter.

As explained in the movie, they came up with it to "capitalize on the popularity of a national sport and exploit the rehabilitative power of fighting’s discipline." Most events took place in the maximum security Klongpai Central Prison. The events are sanctioned by the Thai Department of Corrections and are portrayed as a way for inmates to battle their way to an early release.

On November 9, 2017, Prison Fight was mentioned in the Canadian documentary La Fosse aux Tigres which aired on Canal D.
