= Kim Roger Berglund =

Swedish drug trafficker

- Born: 17 February 1981 (age 45)
- Other name: Kim Eriksson Sirawan
- Occupations: drug manufacturer and trafficker

Kim Roger Berglund (also known as Kim Eriksson Sirawan), born 17 February 1981, is a convicted Swedish drug manufacturer and trafficker. He was a central figure in the Scandinavian underworld during the 2000s. His main criminal activity was producing anabolic steroids, pharmaceutical drugs and smuggling counterfeit cigarettes from China into the EU. Before his arrest he was running his criminal enterprises out of Thailand. Berglund is most known for being sentenced to death in Thailand as well as being the Swedish citizen who has been incarcerated for the longest time in both Thailand and Sweden for a drug-related crime.

According to the US DEA, Berglund was the leader of a criminal organization manufacturing and trafficking drugs which comprised members of the Hells Angels Motorcycle Club and their associates. According to Swedish publications and prosecutors, Berglund was also the mastermind behind the largest clandestine manufacture of anabolic steroids in Swedish history. Berglund used the internet websites vikingstore.org, steroidakuten.org, bodymass.org and netparma.net to market and distribute his steroids and drugs. His operations were conducted continuously from at least 2002 until his arrest in 2010 and were described by authorities as being run like a regular business with company accounts and salaries paid to employees at the end of each month.

On 22 September 2011 he was sentenced to death by the Bangkok Criminal Court, a sentence that was commuted to life imprisonment. He spent eight years and seven months in some of the world's most notorious prisons such as Bombat Piset, Bangkwang and Klong Prem before being transferred to Sweden to serve the remainder of his sentence. He was released on 12 June 2022 after benefiting from a Royal Pardon granted by the King of Thailand. In total Berglund served one month short of 12 years in prison, including 3,117 days in Thai prisons.

== Early life ==
Berglund was raised in the village of Njurunda near the city of Sundsvall. He played ice hockey growing up, as a part of a talented Njurunda generation that included several future professionals. After his own hopes of a career in ice hockey were ended by injury, he turned his focus to body building and worked as a bouncer at various night clubs in his hometown. There were also rumors that he was dropped from his ice hockey team for the use of anabolic steroids.

== Criminal career ==
Berglund is believed to have started his criminal career as an ordinary drug mule and was arrested in 2002 at Arlanda Airport attempting to smuggle two full suitcases of anabolic steroids from Greece. He was sentenced to 1 year imprisonment due to his young age. In a short space of time and from relative obscurity, Berglund became one of Scandinavia's largest steroid suppliers. In just a few years he virtually monopolized the internet market of these drugs using online forums as a medium. One of the reasons for his success was pioneering the production of his own drugs in Sweden instead of trafficking them internationally.

In 2006 Swedish Customs arrested Berglund and two members of the Hells Angels MC in what still amounts to the largest anabolic steroid seizure in Swedish history and the first time a clandestine manufacturing plant was discovered. Also found to be in their possession was a large cache of firearms including several kinds of automatic weapons.

However, despite the seriousness of the offenses, Berglund and his associates were conditionally released after 4 months in solitary confinement due to the complexity of the laws and regulations applying to the method of seizure and the investigative procedure used relating to anabolic steroids. 4 years later, Berglund was sentenced to 3 years and 3 months having benefited from a substantial reduction in sentence due to the application of the European Human Rights Charter article 6 – the right to a fair trial.

As soon as Berglund was released from custody, he immediately resumed his previous activities. Within a few months Berglund's business was operating as it had previously. To avoid the scrutiny of the Swedish authorities, Berglund relocated himself and his family to Thailand to oversee his business activities from a distance.

Beginning in 2008, Berglund significantly expanded his business operations by developing a major smuggling network distributing counterfeit cigarettes originating in China to Sweden, the United Kingdom and Egypt. During the height of this operation, the profit Berglund received from manufacturing anabolic steroids and selling them online exceeded US$80,000 per month while income from counterfeit cigarettes is believed to have been around US$500,000 per month. Authorities have never been able to establish conclusively whether Berglund ever dealt in narcotics or not and Berglund has never been charged or convicted in any jurisdiction for trafficking narcotics.

== Arrest ==
In late 2008 a joint operation code named "Minus 5 Degrees" (foretelling its focus on the drug "ice") was set up between the Swedish National Police (NOA, RKP at the time), the US DEA and the Royal Thai Police with the objective of entrapping Berglund in Thailand's jurisdiction. Documents revealed through the Freedom of Information Act in both the United States and Sweden state the authorities in both countries sanctioned Berglund's entrapment because it was falsely believed that Berglund was attempting to set up clandestine laboratories to manufacture methamphetamines in Sweden and Thailand and intended to use the Hells Angels MC to distribute the drugs. However, during this time and up until January 2010 Berglund had been working as a construction manager in the Swedish-Thai company Thai Hem, building and selling "dream homes" to Scandinavians in Thailand.

Shortly after Berglund was arrested it became evident that the whole entrapment operation was built around an agent provocateur, Thomas Lilius, a notorious narcotics chemist and a former associate of Berglund. Court documents reveal that Lilius had previously been involved in a major drug manufacturing syndicate in San Diego believed to be operating on behalf of the Sinaloa cartel. Lilius became a wanted man and because of international arrest warrants, became trapped in Sweden to avoid possible extradition.

In August 2008, Lilius made a secret deal with the US DEA together with the Swedish national police. Lilius was recruited to enable the entrapment of Kim Berglund in Thailand. In return for his assistance, the US prosecutor dismissed Lilius' case in California resulting in Lilius no longer being subjected to arrest if he left Sweden which does not allow the extradition of its citizens. In return for his collaboration to entrap Berglund, Lilius was paid 5,000 Swedish kronor from the US DEA via the Swedish authorities and was given a new identity and residency in the United States.

The objective was for Lilius to provide Berglund with the knowledge and skills to synthesize methamphetamine, despite Berglund not having experience beyond anabolic steroids and no chemistry training. Lilius assisted to set up a laboratory in Berglund's Rayong home and manufactured a sample of methamphetamine with the aim of getting Berglund arrested in Thailand where he would face a mandatory death penalty for the manufacture of narcotics, summarily imposed by a compliant court in a jurisdiction where the criminal justice system operates without due process or human rights protections. Around 95% of foreigners accused of serious crimes in Thailand are convicted.

The Swedish journalist, Gregers Møller, was present as a translator at Berglund's post-arrest interview by police and wrote a first hand account of the proceedings. Berglund himself has also written about his arrest and is now represented by the award-winning former investigative journalist and agent, Leo Lagercrantz, to write his story. "I want to make a book in the same class as Shantaram, Papillon or Mister Nice," Berglund is quoted as saying.

Berglund believes the Swedish National Police were motivated to cause his entrapment in Thailand because they were highly dissatisfied with the leniency of Berglund's previous conviction in Sweden.

== Aftermath of his imprisonment ==
In connection with his arrest for the manufacture of 53 grams of the class 1 narcotic methamphetamine, Berglund has claimed that the US DEA tried to blackmail him into becoming an informant and infiltrator by offering him a deal to avoid the mandatory death penalty in Thailand (carried out by lethal injection) as well as threatening to arrest his Thai wife and charging her with the same offense. When pressed by the US DEA to give up his business associates, Berglund refused to co-operate in any way that could have benefited him and pleaded innocent at his trial, despite the mandatory death penalty if convicted.

The joint operation resulted in the confiscation of US$2 million worth of property in Berglund's possession at the time of his arrest on 14 July 2010 at his home in Rayong, Thailand.

The Sundsvalls Tidning reported that according to Nils-Eric Schultz, the former state prosecutor now assisting to defend Berglund, "the Swedish police must have broken the law and staged everything together with the DEA, in order to fabricate a crime that Kim Berglund had never committed and for which he received the death penalty. The DEA agent who was involved in this was the same agent who was involved in the big Playa case of cocaine smuggling for millions, where similar methods were used."

In another report by the Sundsvalls Tidning, Nils-Eric Schultz is quoted as saying, "Based on what I have seen, I agree with Kim when he claims that he was the victim of a plot. I've read the documents from the DEA and the National Criminal Police, I've worked a lot with the National Criminal Police and I wouldn't fall off my chair with surprise if it were to be this way." It is unlawful for Swedish authorities to entice someone to commit a crime that they would not otherwise have committed.

The Sundsvalls Tidning reported that, "Nils-Eric Schultz claims that Kim Berglund is right, that he was subjected to a criminal provocation in Thailand which is illegal in Sweden, and that he is therefore entitled to compensation. He would never have been convicted."

Operation Playa was a joint police investigation involving law enforcement agencies of the United States, Sweden, France and Colombia that took place between 2008 and 2014 targeting Jonas Oredsson and Mauritz Andersson, one of the largest drug investigations in Swedish criminal history. The police were criticized for unconventional methods and criminal provocation, and the DEA was accused of being involved in an attempt to recruit a Swedish informant.

Oredsson was convicted by a Swedish court in 2013 and sentenced to 18 years imprisonment. Oredsson appealed and was acquitted in 2014. Oredsson successfully sued the Swedish authorities for his 3 years and 5 months imprisonment during the Operation Playa investigation and was awarded 3 million kronor in damages. A television documentary mini series was produced about Operation Playa in 2018.

== Prison transfer to Sweden ==
Due to the nature of the offense and Berglund's life sentence, his transfer to a Swedish prison was not a straightforward matter. However, the extremely poor conditions of imprisonment in Thailand, in violation of the United Nations' Standard Minimum Rules for the Treatment of Prisoners, together with the real prospect of spending many more years imprisoned in Thailand and the risk this posed for Berglund's deteriorating mental and physical health, made his transfer necessary.

Remaining in a Thai prison also made it very difficult for Berglund to hold the Swedish authorities accountable. As reported by the Sundvalls Tidning, Swedish authorities simply denied Berglund's allegations: "From a previously closed Swedish preliminary investigation into gross misconduct, where the conclusion was that there was 'nothing at all' to indicate that the Swedish police would have been involved in a criminal provocation, it appears that the National Investigation Agency had regular contact with a person, a chemist [Thomas Lilius] with knowledge of drug manufacturing, which provided information on Kim Berglund."

After several diplomatic manoeuvers whereby the Swedish government first denied Berglund transfer to complete his sentence in his home country, the effect of which was to prevent Berglund from accessing the Swedish courts to pursue justice, in early 2019 he was finally transferred to Mariefredsanstalten prison in Sweden.

Soon after his return to Swedish soil and on legal advice, Berglund started several court proceedings against the Swedish state for the violation of his human rights. After years of legal wrangling Stockholm's criminal court finally agreed to try his case in light of the Swedish authorities violating Berglund's fundamental human rights and his subsequent exposure to the death penalty in Thailand which, had he been executed, was tantamount to his illegal execution by the Swedish state using Thailand as its proxy executioner.

== Justice in Sweden ==
Berglund is now claiming over US$4 million in compensation from the State for criminally entrapping him which could very possibly have resulted in his execution in Thailand. The case is set down for hearing early in 2025. Berglund's case is being assisted by the former state prosecutor, Nils-Eric Shultz, now a senior advisor to the Swedish law firm, Scheiman Advokatbyrå. The firm has described the case on its Facebook page as, "...what we consider to be the biggest legal scandal in Swedish legal history – when Swedish police helped get a Swedish citizen sentenced to death." The Sundsvalls Tidning reported Nils-Eric Schultz is, "convinced that Kim Berglund will be right. Otherwise, I would never have stood up. There is documentation from the Swedish authorities and the American DEA that prove that it has happened this way."
