= Neddy Smith =

Australian criminal (1944–2021)

- Born: Arthur Stanley Smith; 27 November 1944; Sydney, Australia
- Died: 8 September 2021 (aged 76); Malabar, Sydney, Australia
- Other name: Neddy Smith
- Status: Deceased
- Convictions: Murder; rape; theft; armed robbery; drug trafficking
- Penalty: Life imprisonment

Details
- Country: Australia
- State: New South Wales
- Locations: Long Bay Correctional Centre; Lithgow Correctional Centre

Smith-Henry Gang
- Years active: 1970s-1980s
- Territory: Sydney
- Ethnicity: White Australians
- Membership: 10-12 members and associates
- Activities: drug trafficking, pimping, robbery
- Rivals: Freeman-McPherson Team, McCann-Domican Gang

Arthur Stanley "Neddy" Smith (27 November 1944 – 8 September 2021) was an Australian criminal who was convicted of drug trafficking, theft, rape, armed robbery, and murder.

Smith served a life sentence since 1989 and was imprisoned in Lithgow Correctional Centre after he was moved from Long Bay Correctional Centre, New South Wales, where he spent 14 years. Smith's partner in crime, Graham "Abo" Henry, claimed in ABO — A Treacherous Life: The Graham Henry Story that the gang of criminals led by Smith committed crimes worth A$25 million in the 1980s.

== Early life ==
Smith was born on 27 November 1944 at Royal North Shore Hospital during World War II to an Australian mother and an American sailor whom he never knew. He was brought up in the Redfern area of Sydney with his half-siblings, and was sometimes cared for by his grandmother. He was first convicted of a crime at the age of 11 for stealing and was sent to a boy's home in Mittagong, and was brutalised at a tough juvenile institution in Tamworth a few years later.

== Criminal career ==
Smith spent much of the rest of his life in prison, serving sentences from 1963 to 1965, 1968 to 1975, 1978 to 1980, and 1989 until his death. Smith was a self-confessed heroin dealer, and armed robber, who gained notoriety for his violent temper. Standing 6 feet 6 inches (1.98 m) tall and weighing 102 kg (224 lb) in his prime, Smith exploited his size when involved in countless street fights and bar brawls. Journalist John Dale has commented that "there is no doubting Neddy Smith's physical size and menacing aura". In Neddy: The Life and Crimes of Arthur Stanley Smith, he claimed to have beaten up former British and Commonwealth heavyweight champion Bunny Johnson after a row outside a Sydney nightclub. However, he denied committing the rape for which he was imprisoned in 1968 and the numerous murders of which he was accused.

Smith gained further notoriety when he became a whistleblower and star witness for the Independent Commission Against Corruption (ICAC) and the Wood Royal Commission. He obtained immunity for all crimes he had committed, except murder, in exchange for testifying against former New South Wales Police detective Roger Rogerson and other allegedly-corrupt police officers.

During ICAC proceedings, Smith testified that he had committed eight armed robberies and had made a large amount of money from dealing heroin. He alleged that members of New South Wales Police had given him a "green light" to commit crimes and had aided him in various robberies and other crimes. He also claimed to have paid corrupt police officers large sums of money to escape criminal charges himself and to assist his friends in avoiding criminal charges.

In his autobiography The Damage Done, Warren Fellows claimed he had witnessed Smith make death threats against two police officers, who attempted to take him in for questioning on his daughter's tenth birthday. Fellows also alleges that he was working for Smith when he was arrested in Thailand for attempting to smuggle 8.5 kg (19 lb) of heroin back to Australia. Fellows was travelling in the company of Smith's brother-in-law, Paul Hayward, who was also charged with trafficking.

Though Smith was charged with eight murders, he was convicted only of the murder of brothel owner Harvey Jones and the murder-in-company of a tow-truck driver named Ronnie Flavell during an incident of road rage on 30 October 1987.

At a Perth coronial inquest in August 2017, it was alleged that Smith was contracted to murder brothel-keeper Shirley Finn in June 1975.

== Blue Murder TV miniseries ==
Smith's claimed exploits and those of allegedly-corrupt New South Wales police officers were depicted in the miniseries Blue Murder, based on his book, Neddy, and produced by Australia's public broadcaster, ABC TV. First aired in most of Australia in 1995, the show was banned in New South Wales until 2001 because of the ICAC hearings, the Wood Royal Commission and outstanding contempt of court charges. Australian actor Tony Martin played Smith, and Richard Roxburgh played Rogerson.

In Blue Murder, Smith is shown murdering whistleblower prostitute Sallie-Anne Huckstepp. Smith was recorded in his prison cell confessing to that crime and later made the same confession to his publisher. However, he otherwise consistently denied involvement in the murder, maintaining that he knew that he was being secretly recorded in his cell and made the statement to gain publicity for his book. He was subsequently charged with Huckstepp's murder, but was acquitted. In his second book, Catch and Kill Your Own, Smith implies ignorance, but told writer John Dale that he knew who committed her murder and would release the information once the killer was dead.

== Later life ==
Diagnosed with Parkinson's disease in 1981, Smith served 14 years in Long Bay Correctional Centre, New South Wales, and was a regular patient at the prison hospital. In 2003, he was moved to Lithgow Correctional Centre.

In 2008, The Daily Telegraph reported that his Parkinson's medication had ceased being effective and that Smith's health had deteriorated, leaving him unable to maintain balance and using a wheelchair. Smith continued to refuse to assist police with ongoing investigations of unsolved murders, which were not covered by the immunity granted to him in exchange for his testimony against allegedly-corrupt police officers at the ICAC and the Wood Royal Commission hearings.

In April 2017, Smith attempted to escape custody while being treated for heart problems at the Prince of Wales Hospital, in Randwick, New South Wales. He allegedly snuck past two prison guards, only to be caught by nurses in the corridor.

Smith died on 8 September 2021 in the Long Bay prison hospital, aged 76.
