= Ginggaew Lorsoungnern =

Thai criminal (1950–1979)

- กิ่งแก้ว ลอสูงเนิน
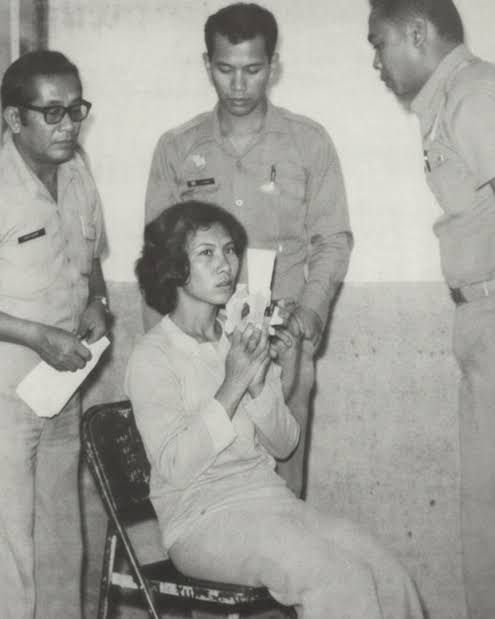
- Ginggaew Lorsoungnern
- Born: 1950; Thailand
- Died: January 13, 1979 (aged 29); Bang Kwang Central Prison, Nonthaburi, Thailand
- Cause of death: Execution by firing squad
- Occupation: Housekeeper
- Known for: Kidnapping and murder of a six-year-old boy; survived initial execution due to situs inversus
- Criminal charges: Kidnapping; Murder
- Criminal penalty: Death

Ginggaew Lorsoungnern (Thai: กิ่งแก้ว ลอสูงเนิน; RTGS: Kingkaeo Lo-sungnoen; 1950 – 13 January 1979) was a Thai woman executed in 1979 for conspiring in a kidnapping and murder plot. She was the second woman in Thai history to be executed by gunfire.

== Kidnapping ==
Ginggaew had been fired from her housekeeping and childcare job by Vichai and Jitra Srijareonsukying, a Bangkok couple with a six-year-old son. Ginggaew needed money, so her 28-year-old boyfriend, who already had a criminal record, suggested holding the boy for ransom. A total of six conspirators were identified by Thai authorities: aside from Ginggaew herself they were Thongmuan Grogkoggraud, Pin Peungyard, Thongsuk Puwised (the spouse of Pin), Gasem Singhara, and Suthi Sridee.

On or around 18 October 1978, Ginggaew picked up the boy from school and took him to their hideout in Nakhon Ratchasima Province. She demanded 200,000 baht from the family, who were instructed to find a flag between the Jantuek and Pakchong railway stations and deposit a bag holding the funds there. However, it was night and the parents failed to find the flag. The kidnappers stabbed the boy and then buried him alive. To avoid being haunted by the boy's spirit, they buried him with traditional burial goods. According to authorities, Ginggaew attempted to stop the murder, but the attempt failed. Prison employee Chavoret Jaruboon stated that there were multiple lurid newspaper accounts of dubious veracity published around the time of the murder. In his memoir, Chavoret stated, "She was all over the news, like some kind of film star."

== Aftermath ==
On 12 January 1979, Ginggaew was sentenced by Kriangsak Chamanan, the Prime Minister of Thailand, to death by firing squad. She was initially incarcerated at Lard Yao Prison at Klong Prem Central Prison. On 13 January 1979, she was transferred to Bang Kwang Central Prison in Nonthaburi Province for execution. After the executioner's volley, Ginggaew was transported to the morgue. Authorities initially believed she was dead, but alerted by her screams, they discovered her in the morgue attempting to stand up. Because of Ginggaew's situs inversus, none of the bullets had struck her heart. She was once again placed before gunfire, and the second volley succeeded.

Gasem and Pin also received death sentences, while Thongmuan was sentenced to life imprisonment. Suthi and Thongsuk were each sentenced to 20 years in prison. Gasem was executed at Bang Kwang on the same day as Ginggaew. Pin also required two volleys of bullets before he died.

== See also ==
- List of botched executions
- Capital punishment in Thailand
- Execution by firing squad
