= Theerasak Longji =

Thai murderer executed in 2018

- Mugshot (date unknown)
- Born: 1992; Thailand
- Died: 18 June 2018 (aged 26); Bang Kwang Central Prison, Nonthaburi province, Thailand
- Status: Executed by lethal injection
- Convictions: Aggravated murder Aggravated robbery
- Penalty: Death

Theerasak Longji (Thai: ธีรศักดิ์ หลงจิ, 1992 – 18 June 2018) was a Thai convicted murderer who was executed by lethal injection for the robbery and murder of a 17-year-old boy, whom he stabbed a total of 24 times. He was convicted, sentenced to death, and executed at Bang Kwang Central Prison. He was the first person to be executed in Thailand since 2009 and remains Thailand's most recent execution.

== Murder ==
On 17 July 2012, 17-year-old Danudet Sukmak was approached and attacked by Longji and another young person in southern Trang province. The attackers, wielding knives, stabbed Danudet a total of twenty-four times. Danudet ran to a nearby park and died at the scene. Theerasak then stole Danudet's mobile phone and money, then fled the area.

== Trial and execution ==
Theerasak knew Danudet and the supposed motivation for the attack was jealousy over a girl. Theerasak had a history of being arrested several times prior to the murder charge. He had been arrested on drug charges, possession of marijuana, and a firearms offense. He was ultimately convicted of aggravated robbery and aggravated murder and was sentenced to death. His conviction was upheld by the Appeal Court and the Supreme Court. The other attacker or attackers were never caught.

On 18 June 2018, Theerasak was executed by lethal injection at Bang Kwang Central Prison. At 4:00 p.m. that day the ruling had been made that he be executed. At 5:00 p.m. he was permitted to phone his wife in an hour's long phone call, during which he proclaimed his innocence. He did not speak to his 8-year-old son. At 6:00 p.m. the lethal injection process began and he was pronounced dead. He spent his final moments praying in Arabic. After his execution, prison officials phoned his mother and told her that she or a family member could collect his body.

Theerasak was the first person to be executed in Thailand since 2009, and the seventh to be executed by lethal injection since Thailand switched from execution by firing squad in 2003. He remains the most recent person to be executed in Thailand.

== See also ==
- Capital punishment in Thailand
- Jaturun Siripongs
- List of most recent executions by jurisdiction
- List of people executed by lethal injection
