= Nola Blake =

Australian woman

Nola Blake is an Australian woman who in 1987 was arrested in Bangkok, Thailand for drug trafficking and subsequently sentenced to death. Her sentence was later commuted to life in prison. Blake resided in Botany, New South Wales and was aged 35 when she was arrested.

== Arrest ==
Blake was arrested on Friday, 23 January, 1987 outside a department store opposite Lumphini Park along with her de facto husband Paul Hudson. With them was their baby son Todd Paul John. 4.47 kilograms of heroin was hidden inside the pillow in her son's push chair. The couple and their child spent the first night after the arrest together with other prisoners in a police cell. The child went into the care of the Australian embassy the following day. Police had been monitoring the pair and saw them pass US$49,000 to a Thai national and accept eight packets which they stuffed into the pillow in the pram. The heroin was said by police to be of "the lowest grade of purity". An officer also claimed that the presence of the child and push chair increased their suspicions as a French film showing in Bangkok at that time, Three Men and a Cradle, had involved drug smugglers hiding heroin in a baby's nappy for a drop. The Thai man, massage parlour operator Supoj Kittidejdamkern, was arrested as he drove away after the meeting. Police followed Blake and Hudson some distance before arresting them. Police said Blake and Hudson had made ten visits to Thailand in the previous seven years.

Blake and Hudson said the numerous trips to Thailand were funded by her work as a school teacher and Hudson's work as a fencing contractor, which earned an average of $1,500 a week. Shortly before the arrest Hudson had also received a $58,000 compensation payment from a car accident. Blake and Hudson reportedly were drug addicts and heavy users of heroin. It was speculated that they were medium level drug dealers supplying heroin in small quantities to distributors to deliver around Sydney, that they received about $40,000 for each trip to Bangkok, and that Blake was the brains behind the operation. They came to the attention of Thai police after making contact with major players in Bangkok drug rings.

Hudson, a 37-year-old Sydney carpenter, described himself as a drug addict who had previously been arrested and jailed in Indonesia on heroin possession charges. One news report quoted a quantity of 8 kg of heroin. Hudson said that he hadn't bought 8 kg, that "I only wanted a little bit", and that it was for personal use. Hudson says he initially admitted to buying the drugs and implicated the Thai national because he had been told by police that Blake and their son would then be freed. "I was trying to get the wife and baby out, but now all bets are off. I will deny everything I have signed and start from scratch." Hudson said that he and Blake had visited Thailand seven times in ten years, not 10 times in seven years as police had claimed. He denied being a heroin addict and denied having ever been convicted of drug trafficking. He admitted he had previously used heroin and had been previously "busted" for possessing drugs. He denied having planned to import the drugs to Australia, and said that importation of 8 kg was impossible. "Anyway, whenever we arrive at Sydney Airport they search us. They have sometimes kept us for three or four hours. I've even been searched internally and have been taken to hospital for ultrasounds."

Their son was kept with Blake and Hudson at Bangkok's Bangrak police station at their request. It was not until 24 hours later that agreement was reached to hand him over to Australia's consular officer Graham Colless. Blake told her lawyers she wanted the baby back with her in prison, something not permitted under Thai law. Their son was aged 14 months at the time of his parents' arrest. He was sent to live with Blake's mother in Sydney, where her two other sons from a previous marriage also lived.

Blake and Hudson were charged with possession of illegal drugs with intent to sell.

== Trial ==
The trial of Blake and Hudson was held on Wednesday 15 June 1988 at the Bangkok Criminal Court. Shortly after their arrest Hudson had provided a written confession claiming he alone had been involved in the drug deal and that Blake knew nothing of it. While admitting to possession, Hudson denied that he intended to sell the drugs.

At the trial, Blake claimed innocence and pleaded not guilty. Blake and Hudson were both found guilty and sentenced to death; however, Hudson's sentence was commuted to life because of his confession. The trial was conducted in Thai with no interpreters. Blake, who spoke some Thai, struggled to follow the reportedly rushed proceedings. She was informed of the outcome only while being led back to the holding cells, and was seen to stagger and almost fall with shock. She later declared that "They're going to kill me. I knew it was coming. I shall not appeal."

At the trial Kittidejdamkern also denied possessing or trafficking in heroin. He was also found guilty and sentenced to death. The court said the maximum penalty was imposed due to the large quantity of heroin involved.

Blake translated the verdict for Hudson, who appeared pale and shaken. Hudson reported that "She never knew it was in the bags I was carrying. She never looked in them - she was just window shopping at the time". The court judgement stated that "her words of denial did not convince the court". The court stressed that several policemen had seen Blake sitting with Kittidejdamkern at a coffee shop table, working out sums on a pocket calculator. Two New South Wales people were arrested and charged after being found to be involved in the Bangkok case.

== Death sentence ==
It was rare for Westerners to receive the death sentence in Thailand, which was, at the time, carried out by automatic rifle(s). One other was Australian pilot Donald Tait who in 1987 was being held in a Thai prison awaiting the death sentence for drug smuggling. However, by the time of Blake's trial in June 1988 Tait had successfully appealed against the verdict and was back in Australia.

Blake was the first Westerner in modern Thailand to face death by shooting. She was the first Western woman in Thailand to be sentenced to death. No western foreigner had been executed in Thailand in preceding decades and there had been no execution of a Thai national on drug charges since the mid-1970s.

== Sentence commuted ==
Blake was imprisoned in Klong Prem Central Prison. The day after the trial she said she had changed her mind and would appeal against the death sentence. In the prison she worked in the kitchen, and took classes learning the Thai language and hairdressing.

Her sentence was commuted to life in 1991.

At the time of Sandra Gregory's arrival at Klong Prem Central Prison in February 1993 Blake was a prison trustee who spoke fluent Thai. Blake was asked to meet and act as a translator for Gregory on her arrival.

Blake received a Royal Pardon and was released in March 1998 having spent 11 years and two months in prison. She returned home on 24 March 1998.

== See also ==
- Barlow and Chambers
