= Klongpai Central Prison =

Prison in Nakhon Ratchasima, Thailand

- Interactive map of Klongpai Central Prison
- Location: Nakhon Ratchasima Province, Thailand; 14°58′21″N 101°58′01″E
- Status: Operational
- Security class: Maximum security
- Managed by: Thai Department of Corrections

Klongpai Central Prison (Thai: เรือนกลางจำคลองไผ่, RTGS: Khlong Phai) is a maximum-security correctional facility located in Nakhon Ratchasima Province, Thailand operated by the Thai Department of Corrections. The prison has received international attention for hosting the controversial rehabilitation program known as Prison Fight. The Thai Examiner referred to Klongpai as a "hell hole" reputedly reserved for the most deadly and ill-behaved convicts in Thailand.

== History ==
Australian drug trafficker Martin Garnett who served a total of 22 years in prisons across three countries following his 1993 arrest in Bangkok for attempting to smuggle 4.7 kilograms of heroin was initially incarcerated at Klong Prem Central Prison. Garnett was later transferred to Klongpai Prison claimed he witnessed five murders within his jail block over the course of a year and alleged that these killings were orchestrated by prison gangs. Martin Garnett's story is featured in the season 10, episode 2 of Banged Up Abroad named Thai Prison Hell.

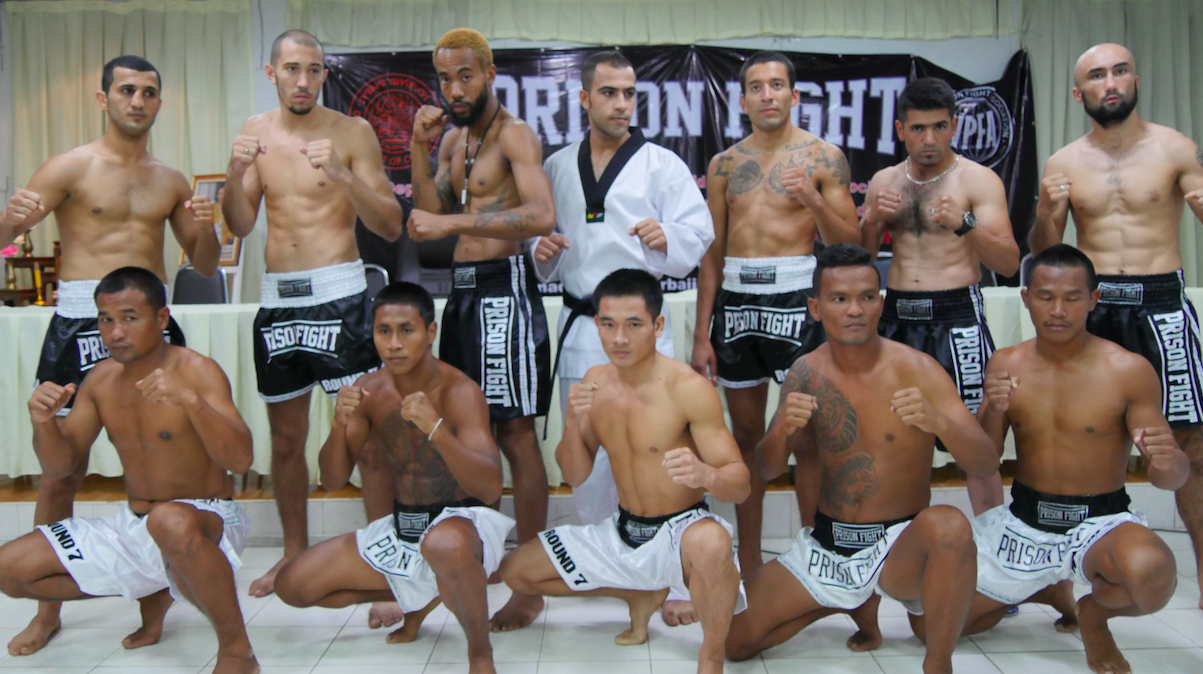
The press conference for Prison Fight: Fight For Freedom held at Klongpai Prison in 2014

Klongpai Prison gained international attention in the early 2010s as for hosting the controversial inmate rehabilitation program named Prison Fight. Unlike more urban institutions such as Klong Prem Central Prison in Bangkok, Klongpai offered a more remote and controlled environment, making it suitable for experimental reforms, including those involving athletic rehabilitation through Muay Thai.

In 2013, the Prison Fight program was launched at Klongpai Prison, where inmates are allowed to participate in Muay Thai fights against foreign fighters. If they won and showed good behaviour, there were eligible for reduced sentences or even a Royal pardon.

In 2014, Canadian professional fighter Dave Leduc competed against Thai inmate in an event held at Klongpai prison.

In 2016, the Prison Fight program was the subject of a short documentary, titled Prison Fight which tells the story of a foreigner fighting an inmate at Klongpai Prison in 2014.

In 2020, Klongpai Central Prison has implemented formal prisoner behaviour development programs aimed at improving inmate conduct and reducing recidivism. A 2020 academic study conducted at the prison found that overall prisoner behavior levels were rated as high following the program’s implementation. However, the study also identified challenges such as inmate illiteracy and the need for special accommodations for prisoners undergoing psychiatric treatment. These factors posed obstacles to equal participation and comprehension of prison regulations.

== See also ==
- Prison Fight
- Muay Thai
- Thai Department of Corrections
- Klong Prem Central Prison
