= Siriraj Medical Museum =

Medical museum in Bangkok, Thailand

Coordinates: 13°45′29″N 100°29′09″E

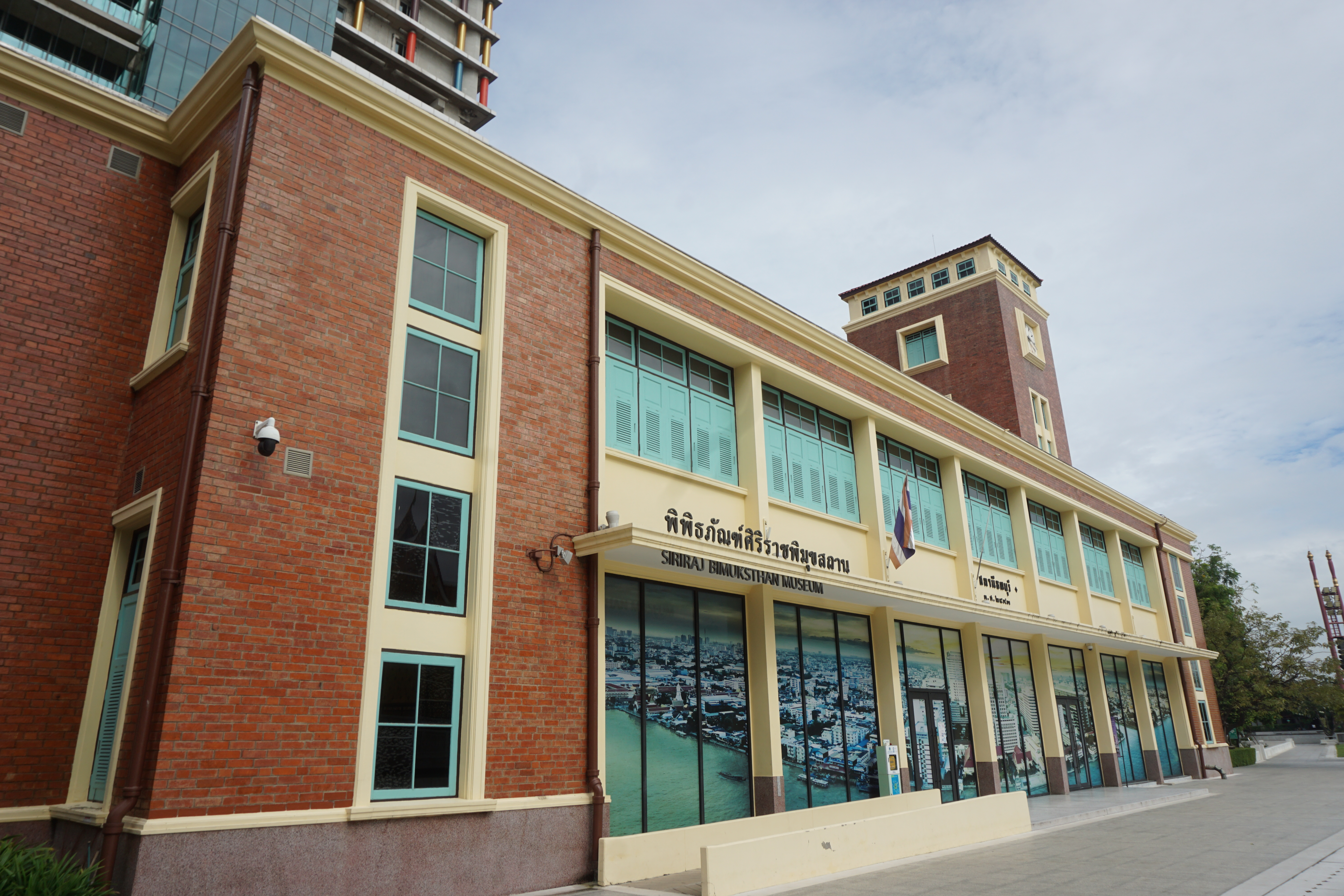
Siriraj Medical Museum entrance

The Siriraj Medical Museum, nicknamed the Museum of Death, is a medical museum in Bangkok, Thailand. Siriraj Medical Museum is open to the public and is a valuable resource for medical professionals and students. This museum consists of seven small medical museums: Siriraj Bimuksthan Museum, Ellis Pathological Museum, Congdon Anatomical Museum, Songkran Niyomsan Forensic Medicine Museum, Parasitological Museum, Touch Museum in Honor of Queen Mother Sirikit, and Sood Sangvichien Prehistoric Museum Laboratory.

== Ellis Pathological Museum ==
As the very first museum to be part of Siriraj Hospital, the Ellis Pathological Museum was founded by Professor Dr. Aller G. Ellis, MD, an American pathologist who began the practice of collecting disease-identified specimens of patients for his pathology class. The museum showcases the top killers of Thai people: heart disease, cancer, and different types of congenital anomalies along with proper treatment and preventive measures.

== Congdon Anatomical Museum ==
Understanding human anatomy is at the core of the study of medicine. This museum has a collection, established by Dr. Edgar Davidson Congdon, of more than 2,000 organs available for anatomical education. The museum displays the anatomical structure of all the systems of the human body, ranging from conception to reproductive age. Different forms of multiple births can be found on display. The range of muscles in the human body, the smallest of which is the size of an eyelash and the biggest of which is the size of a leg can also be seen. On display is a masterful dissection of the whole-body nervous and arterial system by Dr. Patai Sirikarun, the only exhibit of its kind in the world.

== Sood Sangvichien Prehistoric Museum and Laboratory ==
In 1960, Dr. Sood Sangvichien, a specialist in anatomy and anthropology, joined an excavating mission at the archaeological site at Chorakhe Phueak in Kanchanaburi Province. The site is considered to be one of Thailand's most significant prehistoric excavation sites. There, he had the opportunity to study the tools, appliances, ornaments, and earthenware that were buried with the skeletons. He collected these objects and they became the first exhibits at his museum, officially open to the public in 1972. The museum takes visitors back to prehistoric Thailand with the display of a Homo erectus skeleton known as "Lampang man" who lived approximately 1,000,000 to 400,000 years ago. He is a contemporary of the "Peking Man". The exhibit includes tools from three different ages, the Paleolithic, Mesolithic and Neolithic, aged over 1,000,000 – 4,000 years, as well as beads, colourful stones and various designs of painted earthenware.

== Parasitology Museum ==
Dr. Vichitr Chaiyaporn, the founder of this museum, collected parasites from his patients. They are displayed here with a presentation of their life cycle and natural habitat. A wide variety of parasites, ranging from those that are not visible to the naked eye (protozoa), to those up to a metre-long (flatworms) are on display, in addition to information about types of food, cooking processes favouring the growth of the parasites, disease-carrying insects, venomous animals, and preventive measures.

== Songkran Niyomsan Forensic Medicine Museum ==
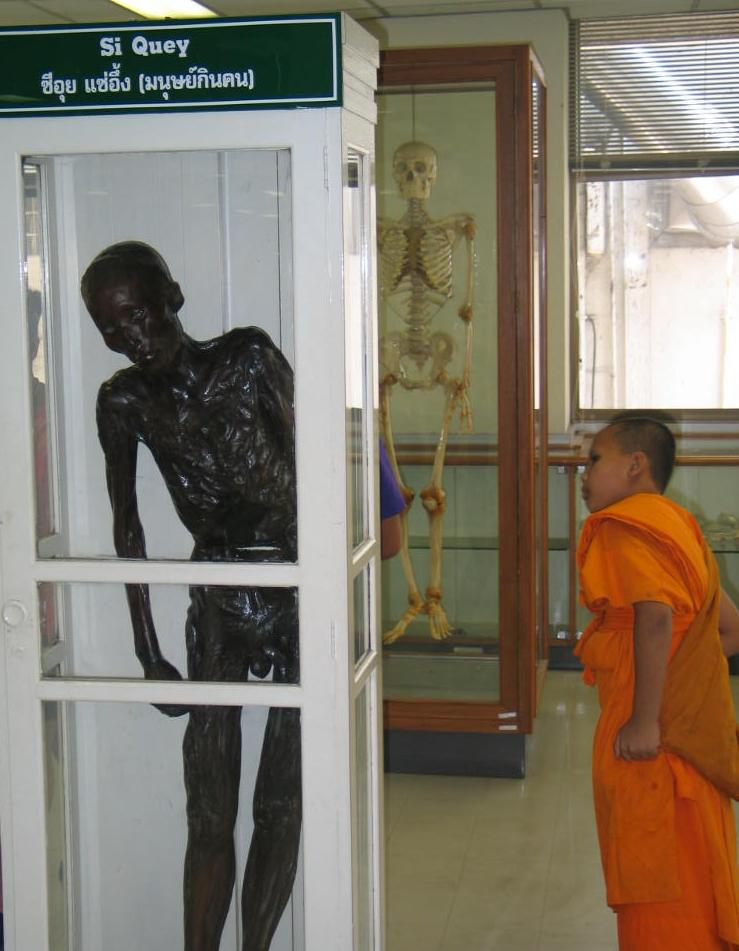
The mummified serial killer, named Si Quey, was displayed in the Forensic Museum until 2020.

Forensic medicine is the application of medical and scientific methodology to the identification of the causes of unnatural death. The exhibits include displays of skulls and various body parts in glass cases, many of them from murder victims, evidence that Dr. Songkran Niyomsan, a forensic pathologist, collected in the course of his career.

This museum contained the mummified remains of the first known serial killer in modern Thai history. Sino-Thai Si Ouey Sae Ung, born in 1927, referred to as "Si Quey" in the exhibition. The name part "Sae" indicates a Chinese clan name in this case, the family of Ung (Huang). Si Ouey emigrated to Thailand shortly after the Second World War. He was employed as a gardener in Noeun Phra, 200 kilometers south of Bangkok.

He was called a cannibal. Between 1954 and 1958, he was charged with the murder of seven children in Prachuap Khiri Khan Province, Nakhon Pathom, Bangkok, and Rayong. When he was captured in 1958, he was trying to burn the body of an eight-year-old. He admitted he had killed the boy and taken out the heart, liver, and kidneys for later dining.

After a trial that lasted only nine days, he was sentenced to life imprisonment. In the second instance, the appeal procedure ended with the death penalty. On 17 September 1959, he was executed by a firing squad. The Siriraj Medical School requested his body for anatomical studies. He was then embalmed and exhibited in the Siriraj Medical Museum with the label "cannibal" as a deterrent to others.

Si Ouey became a bogeyman-style character that parents and grandparents would use to warn children to behave, saying some variation of "if you misbehave, Si Ouey will come and catch you". His body was removed from display, at the museum, following complaints by the residents of the Thap Sakae district where he and most of his victims had lived. They told the National Human Rights Commission that they wanted to give him a proper burial and complained that the display was undignified. Members of his family did not come forward to claim his body, and thus, on July 23, 2020, Si Quey's body was cremated by the corrections department at Wat Bang Praek Tai, a temple near the prison, where he was executed.

== Educational role and recent developments ==
Founded within the historic Siriraj Hospital, Thailand’s oldest hospital, established in 1886, the Siriraj Medical Museum not only preserves specimens and artifacts but also plays a vital role in public health education by engaging visitors with interactive exhibits such as simulated surgical procedures, presentations on traditional Thai medicine, and real historic tools. Some exhibits address ethical issues linked to medical voyeurism, public perception of death, and the complexities of displaying human remains, sparking dialogue among visitors about science, culture, and compassion. In recent years, the museum has also integrated modern technology such as augmented reality into its surgery displays and offers poignant spaces to reflect on the personal impact of medical lineage and Thailand’s advances, from ancient barge discoveries to lessons learned from the 2004 tsunami.
