= Chiang Mai Women's Correctional Institution =

Women's prison in Thailand

Coordinates: 18.8412°N 98.9745°E

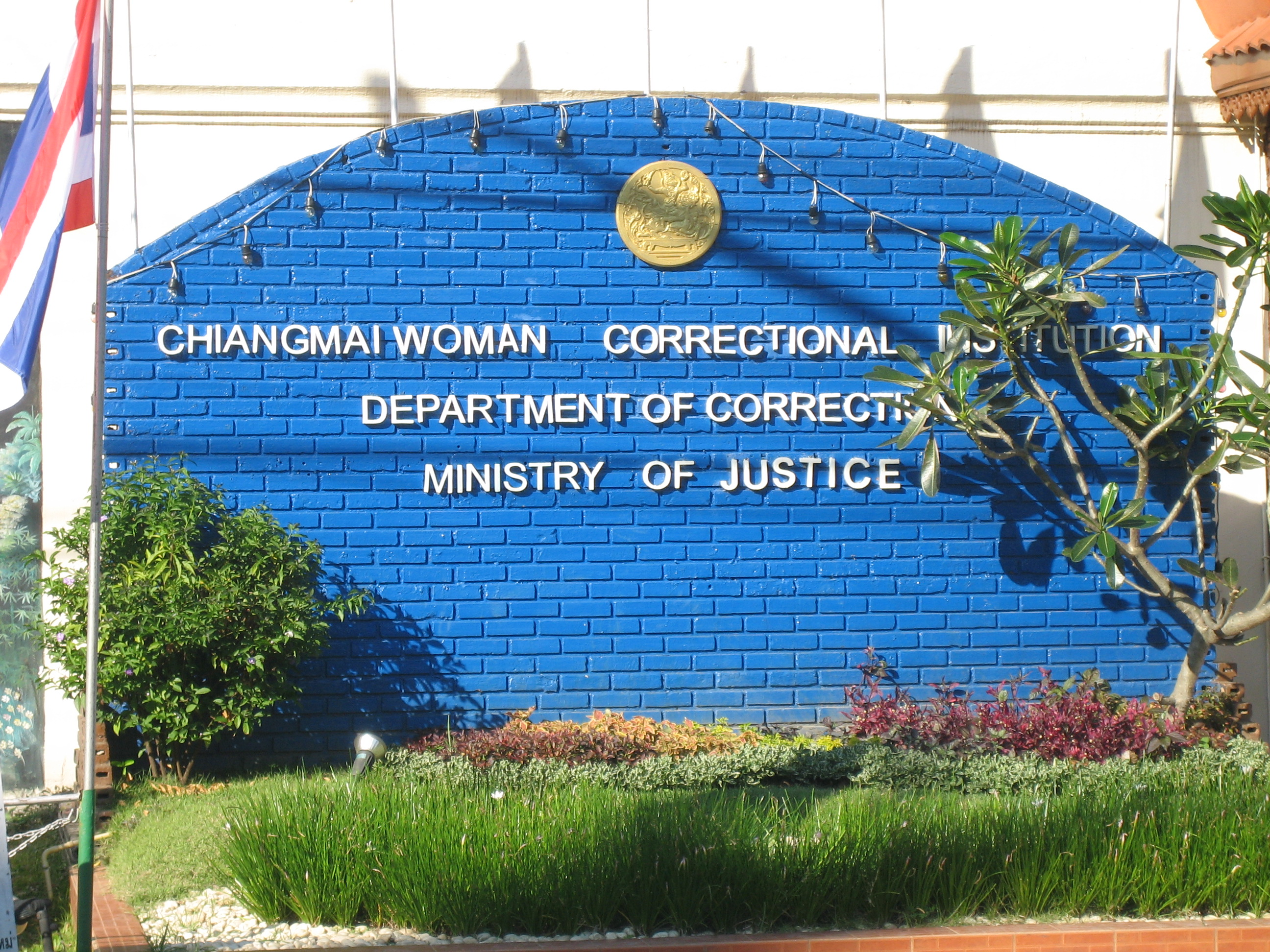
Chiang Mai Women's Correctional Institution

Chiang Mai Women's Correctional Institution (Thai: ทัณฑสถานหญิงเชียงใหม่) is a women's prison in Chiang Mai, Thailand, operated by the Department of Corrections. As of 2015 the warden is Arirat Thiamthong. As of the same year most inmates had committed crimes related to recreational drugs.

The prison has a Thai massage training programme to help inmates adjust to the free world; members of the general public may receive massages from prisoners. Prisoners who participate in the programme can earn money from tips. A former warden's residence, Ruean Pathammarong, is used as the massage parlor.
