= Human Development Foundation =

Thai non-profit organization

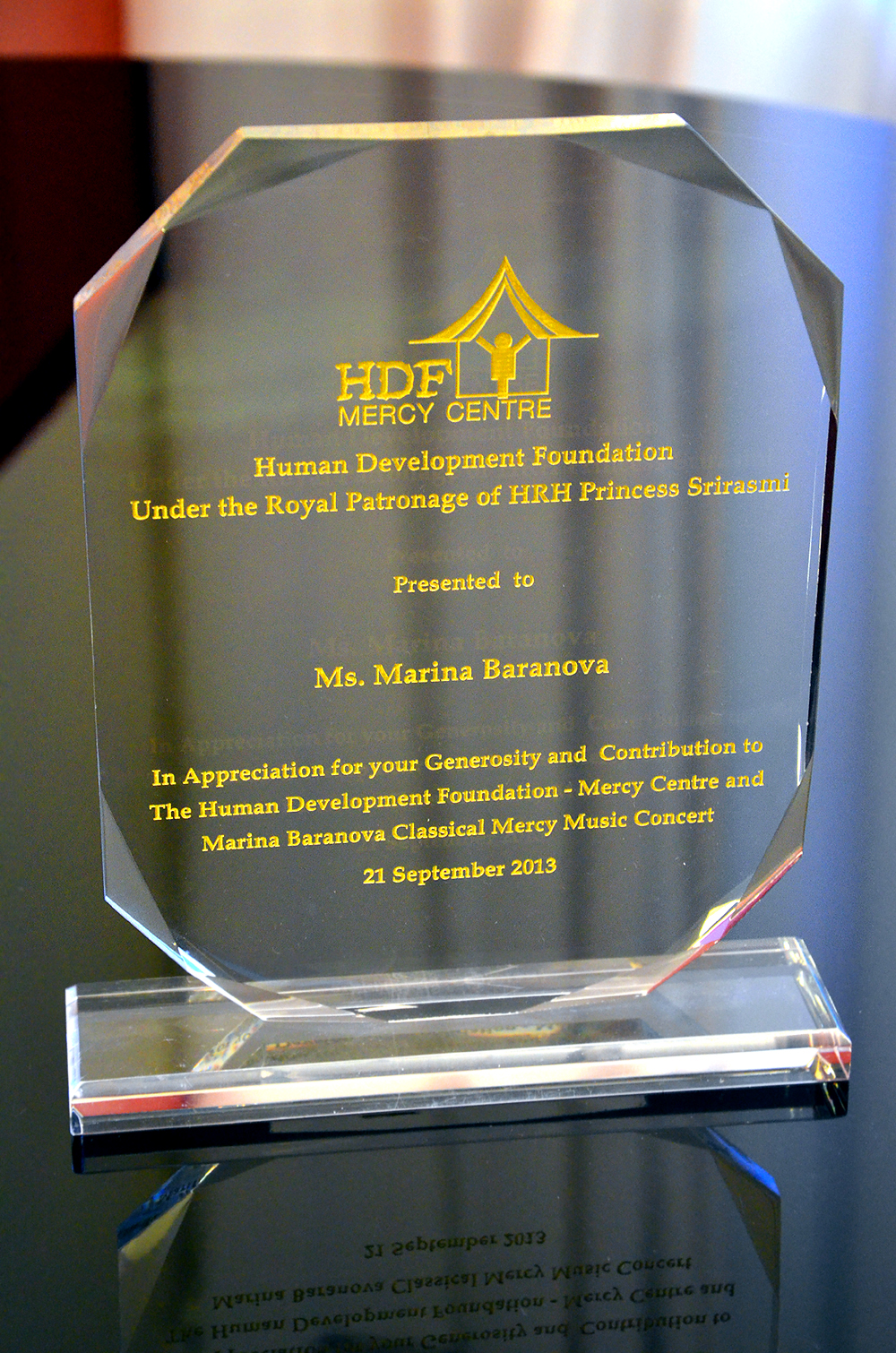
Award from the HDF Mercy Centre from 2013 to Marina Baranova

The Human Development Foundation (HDF), also referred to as the Mercy Centre, is a non-profit and non-denominational organization in Bangkok, Thailand. It was established by Roman Catholic Redemptorist priest Father Joe Maier with Sister Maria Chantavaradom in 1975.

The Human Development Foundation is represented in the US by the Human Development & Children Foundation (HD&CF), a registered 501(c)3 charity, and in the UK by the registered charity Mercy Centre UK.

The organization and its Mercy Centre (the first and largest free AIDS hospice in the Klong Toey slums of Bangkok, founded in 1993) is a declared partnership with the poor, committed to building and operating schools, improving family health and welfare, protecting street children's rights, combatting the AIDS crisis, responding to daily emergencies, and offering shelter to orphans, street children, and to children and adults with AIDS.
