= Paul Hayward =

Australian rugby league footballer and convicted drug smuggler (1954–1992)

Personal information
- Full name: Paul Cecil Hayward
- Born: 11 January 1954 Sydney, New South Wales, Australia
- Died: 9 May 1992 (aged 38) Canterbury, New South Wales, Australia

Playing information
- Height: 5 ft 6 in (1.68 m)
- Weight: 11 st 3 lb (71 kg)
- Position: Halfback
Club
| Years | Team | Pld | T | G | FG | P |
|---|---|---|---|---|---|---|
| 1973–78 | Newtown Jets | 76 | 14 | 43 | 0 | 129 |
- Source: Whiticker/Hudson
- Relatives: Bailey Hayward (grandson)

Paul Cecil Hayward (11 January 1954 – 9 May 1992) was an Australian professional rugby league footballer who played for the Newtown Jets between 1973 and 1978. In 1978, he was convicted for smuggling heroin into Thailand and imprisoned there. After his release in 1989, he returned to Australia. He died of a heroin overdose in 1992.

== Sporting career ==
Paul Hayward played 73 first-grade games for the Newtown Jets during his six seasons with the club, scoring 14 tries and kicking 43 goals.

Originally a South Sydney junior league player from the Waterloo Waratahs club, he later played for a combined Sydney representative side that toured New Zealand in 1976, playing half-back.

== Arrest and incarceration ==
Hayward was the brother-in-law of the convicted criminal Neddy Smith. After the 1978 football season had ended, Smith sent Hayward to Bangkok, Thailand, with Warren Fellows, to arrange a shipment of heroin. On 11 October 1978, Hayward and Fellows were arrested at the Montien Hotel in Bangkok, when a suitcase containing heroin was found in his room. He and Fellows were convicted in Thailand, alongside William Sinclair, for attempting to export 8.4 kilograms of heroin to Australia.

Hayward received a 30-year sentence, while Fellows got life. Hayward was imprisoned in Klong Prem Central Prison, before being moved to Bang Kwang. After being transferred back to Klong Prem, he was released in April 1989, following a royal pardon. He returned to Sydney shortly afterwards.

== Decline and death ==
Hayward became a heroin user during his time in prison and contracted HIV.

On Saturday 9 May 1992, Hayward was home with his family, when he collapsed in the bathroom at about 3:00 pm, according to a police spokesperson. Ambulance officers tried unsuccessfully to resuscitate him, and he was pronounced dead on arrival at Canterbury Hospital. Later, it was announced that he had died of a heroin overdose. He was survived by his wife and three children.
