= John Burdett =

English crime novelist

John Burdett (born 1951) is an English crime novelist. He is the bestselling author of Bangkok 8 and its sequels. His most recent novel in this series, The Bangkok Asset, was published on 4 August 2015.

== Biography ==
Burdett was born in London, England, the son of a London policeman. Burdett is a former lawyer who practised in Hong Kong. As of 2007, he split his time between southwestern France and Bangkok.

== Novels ==
=== The Last Six Million Seconds ===
Set in Hong Kong in April and May 1997, just before the British turnover of the territory to mainland China, this novel deals with a horrific murder investigation. Three severed heads are found in a floating garbage bag on the maritime border between Hong Kong territory and China. They match the three DNA profiles found in a vat of minced human meat that had been abandoned in a warehouse. Political implications of the crime may complicate the turnover, and political pressure is brought both to halt the investigation and to hurry it. The detective, a half-Chinese half-Irish Hong Kong resident, finds himself threatened by both sides—all the more so when a WMD smuggling plot that threatens to force outright war between Britain and China is uncovered.

=== The Sonchai Jitpleecheep Series ===
The Sonchai Jitpleecheep series of crime novels is mainly set in Bangkok and consists of six books: Bangkok 8, Bangkok Tattoo, Bangkok Haunts, The Godfather of Kathmandu, Vulture Peak, and The Bangkok Asset. They centre on the philosophical Thai Buddhist detective, Sonchai Jitpleecheep, and his meditative internal dialogues. Sonchai is a "leuk krung" or half-caste. He is the son of a former "rented-wife" (a type of prostitute) and a "farang". His father was a U.S. military officer whom he never knew. Sonchai has spent much of his childhood in Europe and the U.S.. A born "outsider", he is also seemingly unbribeable, which increases his alienation from his colleagues.

The novels involve Thailand's sex industry and the red-light districts of Bangkok. Sexual matters are part of the narrative, including the juxtaposition of often conflicting Thai and Western norms and mores. They have been widely praised for the breadth and depth of understanding of a number of different cultures. Apart from the Anglo-Saxon cultural traditions with which he was brought up, Burdett has shown considerable familiarity with Confucian, Buddhist, Latin and North African societies, due to his extensive travels.

The novels contain larger-than-life characters intertwined with a wry sense of humour and bizarre crimes. The crimes include execution by the release of a container full of cobra snakes into a car where the driver is forcibly prevented from escaping (Bangkok 8), the theft of valuable tattoos (and their associated human skin) off the backs' of murder victims (Bangkok Tattoo), and homicide related to the production of a snuff video (Bangkok Haunts). Juxtaposed is the investigative nonchalance and Buddhist acceptance of an "arhat" detective who can meditate even in a Bangkok traffic jam. Many popular shamanistic superstitions that have carried over into Buddhism in Thailand are explored. Past lives (reincarnation) and hungry ghosts also contribute to the atmosphere and texture.

== Film ==
All of Burdett's published books have been optioned for films, but due to the exotic location and multi-racial characters, film makers have found it difficult to find appropriate 'stars' and screenplays. Bangkok 8 was optioned by Millennium Films, which produced the fourth movie in the Rambo series in Thailand, and is serious about making the film according to Burdett. Producer John Thompson scouted locations in Bangkok, and James McTeigue, the director of V for Vendetta, had been hired to direct, but production looks to have been cancelled.

== The Sonchai Jitpleecheep Series ==
1. Bangkok 8: A Novel, Alfred A. Knopf (2003) ISBN 0-9657525-3-4
2. Bangkok Tattoo, Vintage Reprint edition (11 July 2006) ISBN 1-4000-3291-1
3. Bangkok Haunts, Alfred A. Knopf (2007) ISBN 0-307-26318-5
4. The Godfather of Kathmandu, Alfred A. Knopf (2010) ISBN 978-0-307-26319-3
5. Vulture Peak, Alfred A. Knopf (2012) ISBN 978-0-307-27267-6
6. The Bangkok Asset, Alfred A. Knopf (2015) ISBN 978-0-307-27268-3

== Other published works ==
- A Personal History of Thirst, William Morrow & Co (February 1996), ISBN 0-688-14399-7
- The Last Six Million Seconds, Hodder & Stoughton (2 January 1997), ISBN 0-340-68904-8
- Freedom Angel, Ai Press (July 2011)
- Death Effect, Kokoro Press (April 2017)

== See also ==
- Prostitution in Thailand
