= Greg Barrett =

American author, freelance writer, public speaker and journalist

- Born: Gregory Lane Barrett; Bristol, Tennessee, U.S.
- Occupations: author; journalist; screenwriter
- Website: GregBarrett.org

Greg Barrett is an American author and newspaper and wire journalist.

== Education and early career ==
He was born Gregory Lane Barrett in Bristol, Tennessee, on November 23, 1961. He grew up in Bristol, Virginia, and graduated from Bristol's Virginia High School in 1980. He is a 1986 graduate of Virginia Commonwealth University in Richmond, Virginia. Prior to college, he was a factory worker at Burlington Industries in Bristol, TN. For more than twenty years in print journalism he worked as a local, national and foreign correspondent for, among others, The Augusta Chronicle (Georgia), The Charlotte Observer (North Carolina), The Honolulu Advertiser, the Gannett Company's GNS/USA Today bureau in Washington, D.C., and for The Baltimore Sun.

== Books ==
His first non-fiction book, The Gospel of Father Joe: Revolutions & Revelations in the Slums of Bangkok (Wiley 2008), is the story of Redemptorist Catholic priest Rev. Joseph H. Maier, a native of Washington in the United States who lives and works in the port-side slums of Bangkok, Thailand. For more than three decades, "Father Joe" and his nonprofit Human Development Foundation and Mercy Centre helped relieve Bangkok's grinding poverty by constructing and managing more than thirty slum preschools, four orphanages and two AIDS hospices, often without church sanction or legal permits.

In June 2012 Barrett's narrative nonfiction book The Gospel of Rutba: War, Peace and the Good Samaritan Story in Iraq was released by Orbis Books. The book was edited by Orbis publisher Robert Ellsberg. In The Gospel of Rutba Barrett tells the story of three U.S. Christian peacemakers who were injured in a bad car accident in Iraq during the U.S.-led bombing of that country in March 2003. He chronicles how the western desert town of Ar Rutba, a Sunni-majority town under heavy attack from the United States, turned the other cheek and cared for the injured Americans: author-activist Shane Claiborne of Philadelphia's The Simple Way; Christian Peacemaker Teams veteran Cliff Kindy; and Mennonite pastor-activist Rev. Weldon Nisly. Three days earlier, on March 26, 2003, Rutba's only hospital had been bombed by U.S. Army Special Forces. After rescuing, treating and protecting the peacemakers, Rutba locals refused the Americans' effort to pay them. Dr. Farouq Al-Dulaimi, the director of the hospital bombed three days earlier, asked for the Americans to do only one thing: "Go and tell the world about Rutba." Seven years later, Barrett, who had reported from the streets of prewar Iraq in January and February 2003 alongside three-time Nobel Peace Prize nominee Kathy Kelly, returned to Iraq with the unarmed peacemakers in an effort to tell the story of Rutba. Archbishop emeritus Rev. Desmond Tutu contributed the book's foreword and The Simple Way's Shane Claiborne, author of The Irresistible Revolution: Living as an Ordinary Radical, wrote its afterword.

== Foreign reporting ==
As a roving national and international correspondent based in the Washington, D.C. bureau for GNS/USA Today, he was dispatched to Thailand in 2000 to report on the social and economic conditions that had precipitated U.N. protocols intended to combat sex trafficking. It was there that he discovered the humanitarian work of the Mercy Centre and Rev. Joe Maier. Barrett has also reported from Egypt, Iraq, Israel and the Palestinian Territories.

== Kamehameha Schools and Bishop Estate investigation ==
In 1997, Barrett was the Native Hawaiian Affairs reporter for the morning newspaper in Honolulu, Hawaii, when he began investigating the controversial management of Kamehameha Schools, a private co-educational college-preparatory school founded in 1887 by Bernice Pauahi Bishop, a Hawaiian princess, philanthropist and the great-granddaughter of King Kamehameha I. The Hawaiians-only school, formally known as Kamehameha Schools/Bishop Estate or KSBE, was managed by the five trustees of Bishop Estate, Hawaii's largest private landowner. Barrett's reports on the micromanaging of Kamehameha Schools unleashed critics of Bishop Estate, which led to an investigation of the estate by Hawaii's State Attorney General. By 1998, the trustees, each of whom were being paid between $800,000 and $900,000 annually, had voluntarily resigned or been permanently removed by the state. Barrett's investigation of KSBE was nominated for a 1998 local-news Pulitzer Prize by the faculty of Kamehameha Schools and is credited in various books for helping to bring about change at Kamehameha Schools and Bishop Estate.

== Children's book ==
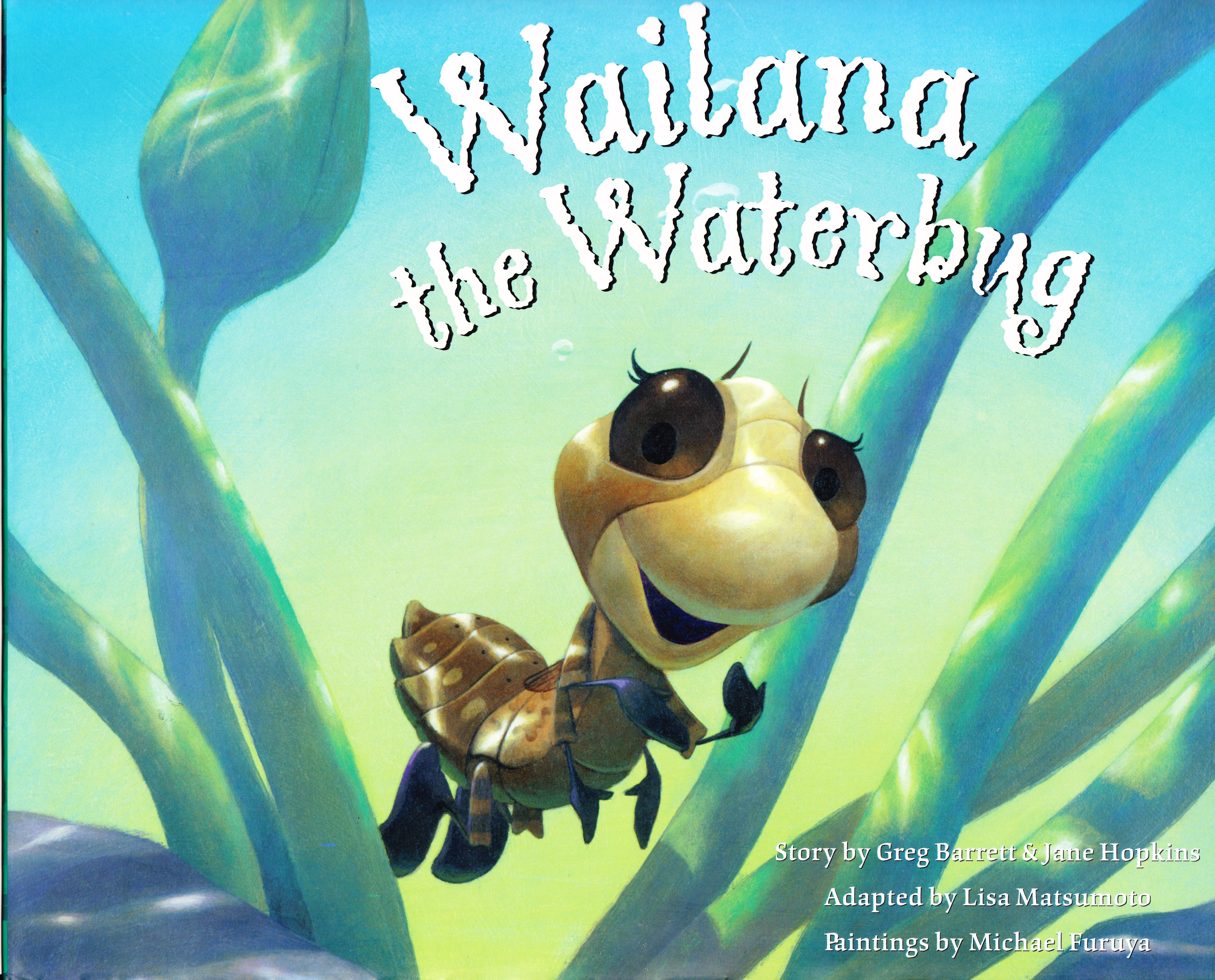
Wailana the Waterbug

In Hawaii he co-authored a children's book with writer Jane Hopkins, adapted by Lisa Matsumoto and illustrated by Michael Furuya. The book, Wailana the Waterbug (Mutual Publishing, 1999), was inspired by the brief but inspiring life of three-year-old leukemia victim Alana Dung. Proceeds from the book benefit the Alana Dung Research Foundation, a public charity founded by Alana's parents to help support medical research on terminal illnesses and to improve the quality of life for children. In 2000 Wailana the Waterburg won Hawaii's Ka Palapala Po'okela award for excellence in children's books. One year later, in July 2001, Hawaii's Ohi'a Productions transformed the book into the theater company's first large-scale musical titled On Dragonfly Wings. On page and stage the metaphor of a waterbug's miraculous metamorphosis into a dragonfly is used to portray death as a beginning, not the end.
