= Joe Maier =

American Redemptorist priest (born 1939)

Father Joe Maier
- Born: Joseph H. Mayer; 31 October 1939 (age 86); Longview, Washington, U.S.
- Years active: 1967–present
- Organization: Human Development Foundation
- Known for: Charitable career in Khlong Toei, Bangkok, Thailand

Father Joseph (Joe) H. Maier, C.Ss. R., (born 31 October 1939) is an American Redemptorist priest who lives and works in the Khlong Toei slums of Bangkok, Thailand, where he co-founded the Human Development Foundation (HDF-Mercy Centre) with Sister Maria Chantavarodom in 1973. For over 45 years, he has administered to Bangkok's poorest, providing vulnerable children and families alternatives to and a haven away from drugs, violence, sexual abuse, and prostitution in the squatter slums.

== Early life ==
Joseph Maier was born at Cowlitz General Hospital in Longview, Washington in 1939, the son of a Catholic mother, Helen Childs Maier, and a German Lutheran, George Maier. His parents separated when Maier was five years old, and later divorced. Thereafter, Maier was raised primarily by his uncle in Longview. Maier enrolled in a Redemptorist seminary in California as a high school freshman and was assigned to Bangkok upon completion of his studies.

Father Joe first arrived in Thailand in 1967. He ministered in northern Isan and to the Hmong in Laos before settling permanently in Bangkok's "slaughterhouse" slums, next to the Chao Phraya River in the Khlong Toei District.

== HDF Mercy Centre ==
Maier and a Thai nun, Maria Chantavarodom, founded the Human Development Foundation (HDF), also known as the Mercy Centre, in 1972. The HDF began as a single one-baht-a-day preschool, and has since expanded into a network of over 30 schools all over Bangkok, which have graduated an estimated 35,000 children. Today, in addition to schools, HDF operates orphanages and homes for street kids, assists children and adults living with AIDS, provides emergency assistance and home repair to slum families affected by crippling floods and fires, acts in cooperation with community members to mediate activities involving welfare organizations, housing authorities, governmental agencies, and the Port Authority of Thailand.

In 2000, a gift from Atlanta businessman and philanthropist John M. Cook allowed for the major physical expansion of Mercy facilities. The multi-structure compound includes a 400-pupil kindergarten, a home for street kids, a home for mothers and children with AIDS, a 26-bed free AIDS hospice, a legal aid anti-trafficking unit, and various administrative offices that oversee operations ranging from a sponsor-a-child program, to community health and outreach services. The centre includes a house for Father Joe on Mercy grounds, the terms of the donation having stipulated that he move out of the slaughterhouse slums and away from the ostensible health hazards of slum living.

The Mercy Centre extended its humanitarian efforts to southern Thailand following the devastating 2004 Asian tsunami, sending down relief teams to directly aid remote villages, from Satun to Ranong, hit hard by the disaster.

== Interfaith dialogue ==
Father Joe has been both praised and criticized for his broad religious philosophy. In a 2004 PBS documentary, he described himself as having been "converted" by Buddhists and Muslims, remarks that have stirred some controversy. He made a similar comment in 2008, when he told CNN, "Buddhists and Muslims taught me how to be a Christian."

== Recognition ==
Mercy is regularly sought out by foreign dignitaries. Recent visitors have included Prince Alfred and Princess Raffaela of Lichtenstein in March 2003; AIDS activist and American film actor Richard Gere in July 2004; and American president George W. Bush in August 2008.

Father Joe is the recipient of numerous awards and honors in recognition of his life's work. In 2004, he was personally thanked by Queen Sirikit as the foreigner who has made the most significant contribution to the protection of the women and children of Thailand.

== Writings ==
Welcome to the Bangkok Slaughterhouse is a collection of 24 short stories about Mercy Centre children, written by Father Joe. All book proceeds go to the Human Development Foundation. Father Joe was a regular contributor to Sunday Perspective section of the Bangkok Post before the section's discontinuation in late 2008.

== The Gospel of Father Joe ==
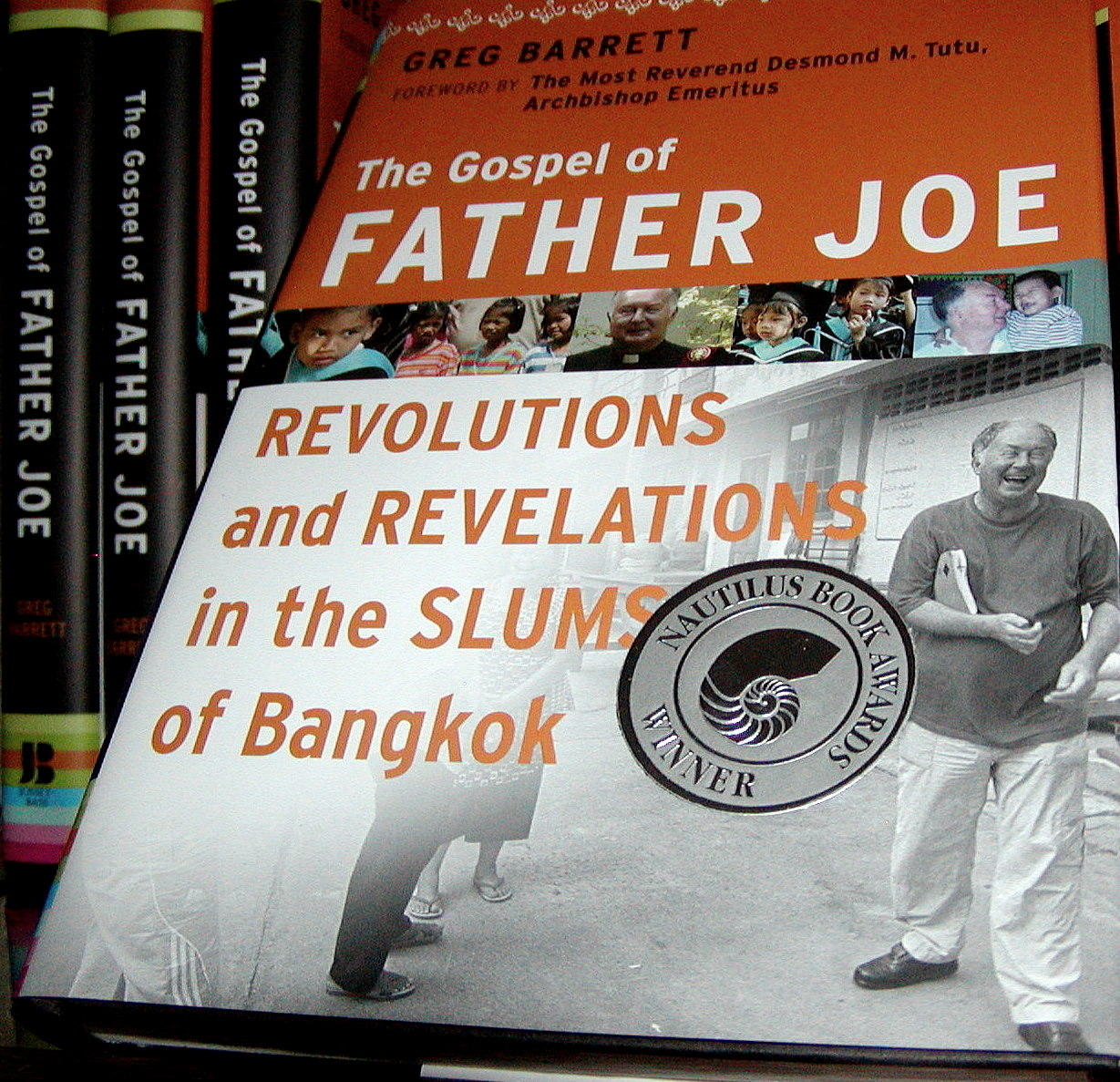
The Gospel of Father Joe book jacket

In 2008, Jossey-Bass, an imprint of Wiley Books, released a biography of Father Joe entitled The Gospel of Father Joe: Revolutions and Revelations in the Slums of Bangkok. The 321-page narrative (or literary) nonfiction book was written by American foreign correspondent Greg Barrett.

Barrett first met Father Joe in 2000 when he was a Gannett News Service correspondent based in the GNS/USA Today bureau in Washington, DC. He had been dispatched to Thailand to report on human trafficking. Several years later he returned to Bangkok to begin researching and writing The Gospel of Father Joe. Archbishop Desmond Tutu contributed the book's foreword. In 2009, The Nautilus Book Awards honored The Gospel of Father Joe with a silver medal in the category of Conscious Media-Journalism-Investigative Reporting.
