= Klong Prem Central Prison =

Prison in Bangkok, Thailand

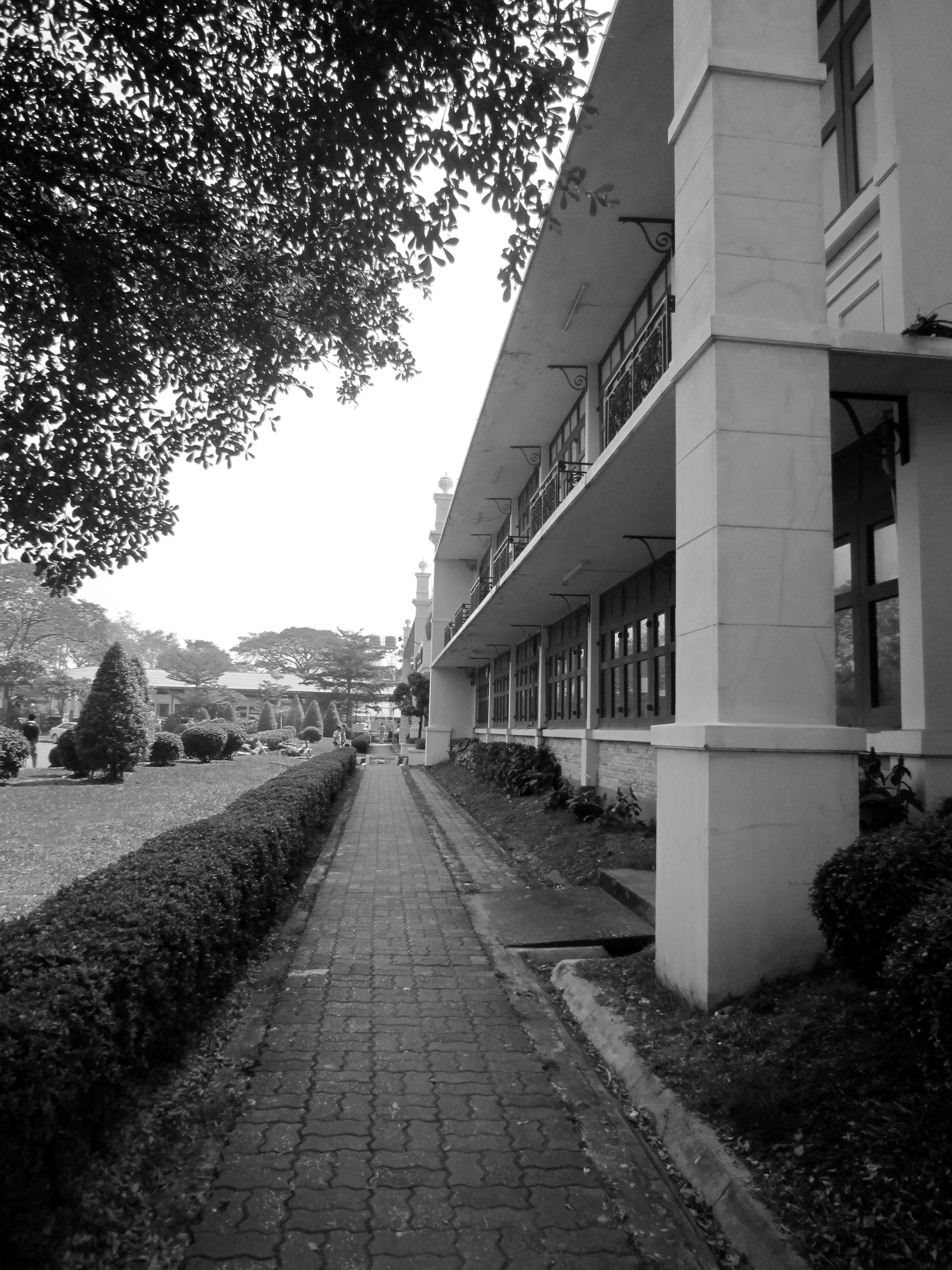
- Klong Prem in 2011
- Interactive map of Klong Prem Central Prison
- Location: Bangkok, Thailand; 13°50′50″N 100°33′14″E
- Status: Operational
- Security class: Maximum security
- Opened: 1944
- Managed by: Thai Department of Corrections

Klong Prem Central prison (Thai: เรือนจํากลางคลองเปรม; RTGS: Rueancham Klang Khlong Prem) is a maximum security prison in Chatuchak District, Bangkok, Thailand. The prison has several separate sections. The compound houses up to 20,000 inmates. Within the perimeter of the compound are the Women's Central Prison, often referred to as "Lat Yao" or "Lat Yao women's prison". There is the Central Correction Institution for Drug Addicts (also known as "Bambat Phiset"), Bangkok Special Prison (Thai: เรือนจําพิเศษกรุงเทพมหานคร), and the Central Correctional Hospital. The Lat Yao men's section takes custody of male offenders whose sentence term is not over 25 years. As of 2002, the men's section held 1,158 foreigners from 56 countries out of a total of 7,218 prisoners. It is a part of the Thai Department of Corrections. The Klong Prem section for women houses female death row inmates.

== History ==
Klong Prem Central prison was originally a temporary prison established in 1944 in the Lat Yao District as a consequence of demands during World War II when Thailand was at war with Britain and the United States. In 1959 it was used as a vocational training centre for those who, in the words of the Thai corrections department, "act and behave as gangsters".

In 1960 the old Klong Prem prison on Maha Chai Road (now the Bangkok Corrections Museum) had become overcrowded so all prisoners were transferred to the vocational training centre site. The Interior Ministry established a temporary prison within the new compound by dividing one part into a vocational training centre and the other part into the Lat Yao temporary central prison. In 1972 the Interior Ministry issued orders establishing the prison on Maha Chai Road as the "Bangkok Remand Prison" and the prison in the Lat Yao Subdistrict was designated the "Klong Prem Central Prison".

== Visiting Klong Prem ==
Klong Prem Central Prison allows the families and pre-registered guests of inmates to visit prisoners. Visiting rules and times vary and international visitors have some special privileges. Different days are allocated to certain cell blocks. Weekend visits are typically prohibited. Additional privileges (e.g., phones, longer visits) when visiting foreign prisoners can sometimes be attained with a letter from the appropriate embassy or with bribes to prison guards. Food for prisoners can be purchased at the commissary by completing a form listing the items to be purchased and the prisoner's name. After paying for the items, the order is generally delivered that evening or the next day.

As of October 2018, prisoners are normally held in Bangkok Remand Prison until sentencing. After sentencing, they may be sent to either the main prison, Bambat Phiset (for drugs offences), or complete their sentence in Bangkok Remand Prison. In Bangkok Remand Prison there are eight buildings in which prisoners may be held.

== Prison World Cup ==
With the large number of foreign nationals at Klong Prem, the prison is able to hold a football World Cup. Teams of 10 are chosen by prison staff to represent Nigeria, Japan, the US, Italy, France, England, Germany, and Thailand. Games consist of two 20-minute halves on a half-sized pitch. The winners are given a replica of the real World Cup trophy, which is made of wood in the prison workshop.

== Current and former notable prisoners ==
Foreign prisoners are concentrated in Building 2, and those prisoners may have contact visits for several days providing visitors can demonstrate they have traveled from another country. As of June 2010, there are many foreign prisoners in other buildings of the prison complex.

- Jon Cole, American heroin smuggler. Author of Bangkok Hard Time.
- Ginggaew Lorsoongnern, convicted of murder.
- David McMillan: Arrested for drug charges, he successfully escaped from the prison in August 1996 and has published a book titled Escape which describes his time in Klong Prem and his escape.
- Dmitry Ukrainskiy: In 2016, Russian businessman Dmitry Ukrainskiy was arrested in Pattaya, Thailand, along with Uzbeki Olga Komova in Ko Chang District. Dmitry Ukrainskiy was initially held on an arrest warrant based on a provisional extradition request from the United States. The Russian Federation initiated its own extradition request for Dmitry Ukrainskiy. Ukrainskiy was charged with a civil case amounting to 18.1 million baht and a criminal case involving charges of money laundering and other business-related charges. Ukrainskiy is in the Klong Prem Remand Prison, pending appeals.
- Sandra Gregory: British woman who was imprisoned in Thailand for drug smuggling after being caught trying to smuggle heroin and temazepam out of Bangkok's Don Mueang Airport. The King of Thailand granted Gregory a royal pardon and she was released on 18 June 2001.
- Nola Blake: An Australian woman who in 1987 was arrested in Bangkok for drug trafficking. Blake received a royal pardon and was released in March 1998 having spent 11 years and two months in prison. She returned home 24 March 1998.
- Harry Nicolaides: An Australian writer of Greek-Cypriot origin imprisoned in Thailand under the Thai lèse majesté law, for a passage in a 2005 novel of his deemed to defame the Thai monarchy. On 19 January 2009 he was sentenced to three years in prison. He was pardoned on 21 February, after having spent six months in prison.
- Paul Hayward: An Australian man who was convicted in Thailand, alongside Warren Fellows and William Sinclair, for attempting to export 8.5 kilograms of heroin to Australia. After being transferred back to Lat Yao he was released on 7 April 1989, after being granted a royal pardon.
- Roger Thomas Clark: arrested in April 2015, suspected of being Variety Jones, the closest advisor to Ross Ulbricht, alleged founder of the Silk Road dark website. Roger Thomas Clark was extradited from Bangkok to New York on 15 June 2018, where he faces a maximum penalty of life in prison.
- Viktor Bout: Russian arms dealer arrested on 6 March 2008 by Thai Police for allegedly conspiring to supply the Revolutionary Armed Forces of Colombia (FARC). He was extradited to the United States on 16 November 2010.
- Andrew Hood (some reports say "Hoods"): Arrested in departure hall of Bangkok's Suvarnabhumi International airport on 17 December 2008 and charged with trafficking heroin. On 5 August 2009 he was sentenced to life imprisonment for drug trafficking. He avoided the death penalty by confessing to the crime.
- Kim Roger Berglund: A Swede who was entrapped by the US DEA in a sting operation and subsequently sentenced to death sentence, later commuted to life imprisonment. Berglund was convicted for operating a methamphetamine lab.
- Sineenat Bilaskalayani: Royal Noble Consort to King Vajiralongkorn who was stripped of her titles due to subversion and disrespect shown toward Queen Suthida. Released and rehabilitated following a royal pardon on 28 August 2020.
- Thaksin Shinawatra: former Prime Minister of Thailand who had sentenced in absentia for corruption during his time in office. Shinawatra was promptly arrested and taken to prison upon his re-emergence from exile in August 2023. He was transferred to a hospital on the same day, where he served 6 months before being released. However, on Sept 8th 2025, the Supreme Court ruled that Thaksin arranged his transfer from prison to hospital to avoid imprisonment, as such, he was remanded back to prison to serve his one-year sentence.
- Jonathan Wheeler: a British man arrested for drug smuggling in Thailand in 1994, served 16 months in Klong Prem before being moved to Bang Kwang prison when he received a 50 year sentence. Wheeler would go on to become one of the longest serving western inmates in Thai prison after spending more than 18 years behind bars. He chronicled his story in the book, The Tiger Cage: 18 Years in Thai Prison.
- Billy Moore, a British boxer and author of A Prayer Before Dawn

== See also ==
- Bang Kwang Central Prison – Bangkok's other main prison which holds male inmates with sentences of more than 33 years.
- Klongpai Central Prison - Maximum-security correctional facility located in Nakhon Ratchasima Province.
