= Capital punishment in Thailand =

Capital punishment in Thailand is a legal penalty, and the country is, as of 2021, one of 54 nations to retain capital punishment both in legislation and in practice. Of the 10 ASEAN nations, only Cambodia and the Philippines have outlawed it, though Laos and Brunei have not conducted executions for decades.

Thailand retains the death penalty, but carries it out only sporadically. Since 1935, Thailand has executed 326 people, 319 by shooting (the latest on 11 December 2002), and 7 by lethal injection (the latest on 18 June 2018). As of March 2018, 510 people are on death row. As of October 2019, 59 are women and 58 are for drug-related crimes. Bang Khwang Central Prison contains the nation's primary death row, but death rows are present for both men and women in provincial prisons.

Thai law permits the imposition of a death sentence for 35 crimes, including treason, murder, and drug trafficking.

== History ==
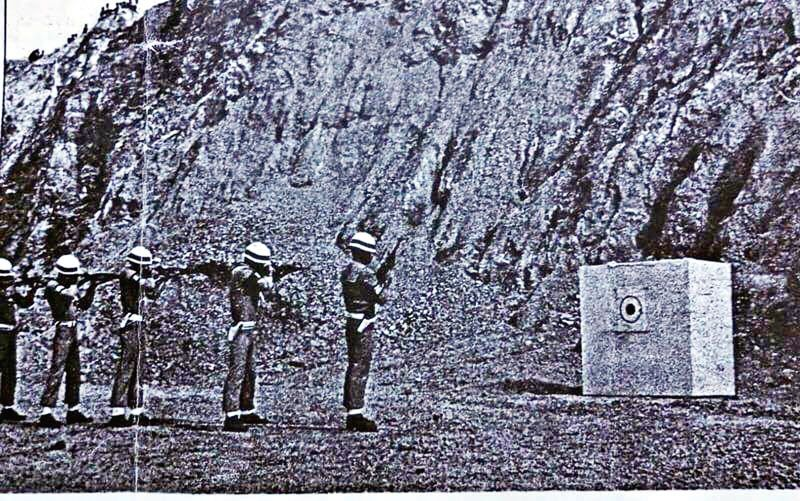
Firing squad publicly executed Somsak Khwankaeo at Sattahip district on 1 December 1971

During the Rattanakosin period, Thailand—then called Siam—was under the "Law of the Three Seals", also called Kotmai Tra Sam Duang. This system was codified in 1805 during the reign of King Rama I. There were 21 different forms of capital punishment under the Law of the Three Seals, many of them cruel. For example, those convicted of treason would be wrapped in oil-soaked cloth and set ablaze. Of these 21 methods of death penalty, only 1 method was used for perpetrators of treason, offences against the king, robbing and burning cities, palaces, granaries, royal treasuries or temples, cruelty to monks and villagers, murder of parents, teachers or preceptors, trampling or obscenity to statues of Buddha, cutting off a child's hands, feet, or neck to remove jewellery. For the crimes other than these, offenders received the death penalty by beheading. Later in the reign of King Rama V, all 21 methods in Law of the Three Seals were abolished, with beheading as the only method until Thailand became a constitutional monarchy following a bloodless revolution in 1932.

The execution method was changed again in 1935, with shooting as the only method. The offenders were handcuffed to a cross and an executioner fired a machine gun at their back on command, as described in 1955 when 3 men were executed (for killing King Ananda Mahidol) "with their arms fixed to the cross bar and their hands clasped in a traditional wai. In their hands were placed incense sticks, flowers and candles. The executioner fired a barrage from a sub-machine gun at each condemned man's heart".

Ginggaew Lorsoungnern, a well-known female condemned who had organised a kidnapping, was put on the cross twice as she survived the first volley. In 19 April 2001, five convicts, four of them are drug trafficker were executed in Bangkwang Central Prison on live television, provoking strong criticism from human rights groups.

On 19 October 2003, Thailand officially abolished shooting and adopted lethal injection as the sole means of execution. The last execution by shooting was on 11 December 2002, when 57-year-old man was executed for murdering his adopted daughter's husband in Chumphon province and the first execution by lethal injection was on 12 December 2003.

According to a statement by the Corrections Department on 18 June 2018, there have been a total of 326 people legally executed under the modern Penal Code since its enactment in 1935, of whom 319 were executed by means of shooting, and seven by lethal injection.

An execution occurred on 18 June 2018, when the death sentence of a 26-year-old man guilty of robbery resulting in death was carried out. This was the first execution in nine years and the man was the country's seventh person to be executed by means of lethal injection.

The number of executions in Thailand since 2002
2002	2003	2004	2005	2006	2007	2008	2009	2010	2011	2012	2013	2014	2015	2016	2017	2018	2019	2020
11	4	0	0	0	0	0	2	0	0	0	0	0	0	0	0	1	0	0

== Public opinion ==
A 2014 Bangkok Post article said that Mahidol University lecturer Srisombat Chokprajakchat's survey indicated "more than 41% of Thais nationwide want to keep the death penalty on the books, but only 8% want to scrap capital punishment, with the majority undecided...most of those who favoured execution as a legal punishment felt it was the most effective deterrent against capital crimes, including murder and rape".

The Bangkok Post in 2018 asked whether the death penalty should continue to be enforced. A majority, 92.49%, agreed and 7.51% disagreed. Another survey indicated that 41% wanted to retain the death penalty as a sentencing option. Prime Minister Prayut Chan-o-cha in 2018 said that the death penalty is necessary to maintain peace and order and deter severe crimes.

== See also ==
- Crime in Thailand
- Extrajudicial killings in Thailand
- Law of Thailand
- Execution of Thai royalty
