= Warren Fellows =

Australian convicted drug courier (1953–2022)

- Born: 13 September 1953; Sydney, New South Wales, Australia
- Died: 14 January 2022 (aged 68); Ryde Hospital
- Known for: Drug trafficking; The Damage Done

Warren Fellows (13 September 1953 – 14 January 2022) was an Australian convicted drug courier who was sentenced to life imprisonment in Thailand in 1978 for his role in a heroin trafficking operation. In his best-selling book The Damage Done, Fellows describes the violence and harsh conditions he experienced in Thai prisons.

== Biography ==
=== Early life ===
Fellows was born in Sydney, Australia, on 13 September 1953, the youngest of three children. His father was a champion jockey and horse trainer who won the 1949 Melbourne Cup on Foxzami. Fellows was educated at De La Salle College, a Catholic school for boys in Ashfield. He claimed he was nearly expelled from the school when he was caught running a horse betting operation from his school desk.

=== Drug trafficking ===
Fellows worked in various jobs, including as a bartender and an apprentice hairdresser in Double Bay. It was through his bar work that he first became involved with drug trafficking, successfully importing hash from India with a friend. On his return to Australia, he married and had a child. He was later hired to travel to Los Angeles, Hawaii, and South America to smuggle cocaine into Australia. Fellows came to know the drug dealer William Sinclair, who took him to Bangkok, Thailand, where he was introduced to Neddy Smith and made his first successful attempt at smuggling heroin into Australia. He continued to work for Smith as a drug courier, both domestically and internationally.

=== Thailand ===
In October 1978, Smith instructed Fellows to travel to Bangkok, this time in the company of Smith's brother-in-law Paul Hayward, a professional rugby player and boxer who had previously done "favours" for Smith. Prior to leaving Australia, Fellows was tipped off by a friend that the Commonwealth Police believed he was involved in a large drug importation operation and had him under surveillance. Fellows reported this to Smith, who dismissed it and insisted they proceed with the job.

On arriving in Thailand, Fellows and Hayward met William Sinclair, who now lived in Bangkok and owned the Texas Bar. Sinclair took them to his bar, and in a drunken state, attempted to obtain information from them about their trip. Unbeknownst to them, the trio were under surveillance, and the meeting appeared to police to incriminate Sinclair, even though according to Fellows, he was not involved. Fellows later claimed that there were many warning signs and that the night before their arrest, he had a "moment of clarity" and resolved to wash the heroin down the bath drain, though he forgot to do so and fell asleep.

=== Arrest ===
On 12 October 1978, the rooms occupied by Fellows and Hayward at the Montien Hotel in Bangkok were raided by the police. The pair were arrested when 8.5 kilograms of heroin were found in a suitcase in Hayward's room. Fellows alleged they were subjected to physical and psychological abuse at the hands of Thai Narcotics Suppression unit officers, who demanded they make statements incriminating Sinclair. Fellows claimed they resisted due to Sinclair's innocence, but he eventually relented, when officers informed them they would be executed without trial under Thai law. Fellows and Hayward agreed to sign the statement, and Sinclair was arrested and charged.

The three men were sent to the Special Bangkok Metropolitan Prison (now Rommaninat Park and the Bangkok Corrections Museum), spending three years there before convicted of heroin trafficking. Sinclair and Fellows were sentenced to life imprisonment, and Hayward received 30 years. They were subsequently transferred to Bang Kwang Central Prison. In 1983, Sinclair's conviction was overturned on appeal. Hayward later received a royal pardon and was released in 1989. Fellows also received a pardon and went free on 11 January 1990.

Whilst imprisoned in Thailand, Fellows attempted suicide several times and became addicted to heroin.

=== Return to Australia ===
Upon his return to Australia, Fellows spent two weeks in a hospital being treated for malnutrition and pneumonia. In 1997, he published the autobiographical book The Damage Done, detailing his time spent in prison.

== See also ==
- List of Australians in international prisons
