= The Damage Done (book) =

1997 book by Warren Fellows

- First edition
- Author: Warren Fellows
- Language: English
- Subject: Autobiography
- Genre: Non-fiction
- Publisher: Macmillan Publishers
- Publication date: 1997
- Publication place: Australia
- Media type: Print (Paperback)
- Pages: 211 p
- ISBN: 0-7329-0914-7
- OCLC: 38824302

The Damage Done is a book by Australian Warren Fellows. It portrays his time in the notorious Bangkwang prison, nicknamed "Big Tiger". Fellows was sentenced to life imprisonment in 1978, convicted of heroin trafficking between Bangkok, Thailand and Australia.
