= Department of Corrections (Thailand) =

Government prison agency of Thailand

- กรมราชทัณฑ์ Krom Ratchathan
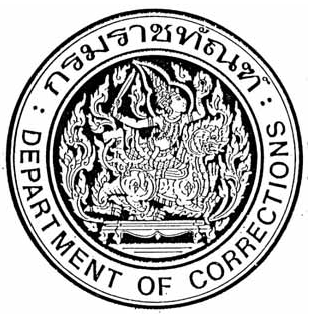
- Seal of Yama, god of the underworld, riding on Rajasiha, the great Lion

Agency overview
- Headquarters: Suanyai Sub-district, Mueang Nonthaburi, Nonthaburi, Thailand
- Annual budget: 13,430 million baht (FY2019)
- Agency executive: Sahakarn Phetnarin, Director-General
- Parent agency: Ministry of Justice
- Website: main.correct.go.th

The Department of Corrections (Thai: กรมราชทัณฑ์, RTGS: krom ratchathan) is an agency of the Thai Ministry of Justice. Its mission is to keep prisoners in custody and rehabilitate them. Its headquarters is in Suanyai Sub-district, Mueang Nonthaburi District, Nonthaburi Province. As of 2020, Police Colonel Suchart Wongananchai is director-general of the department. Its FY2019 budget was 13,430 million baht.

== Prisons and prison population ==
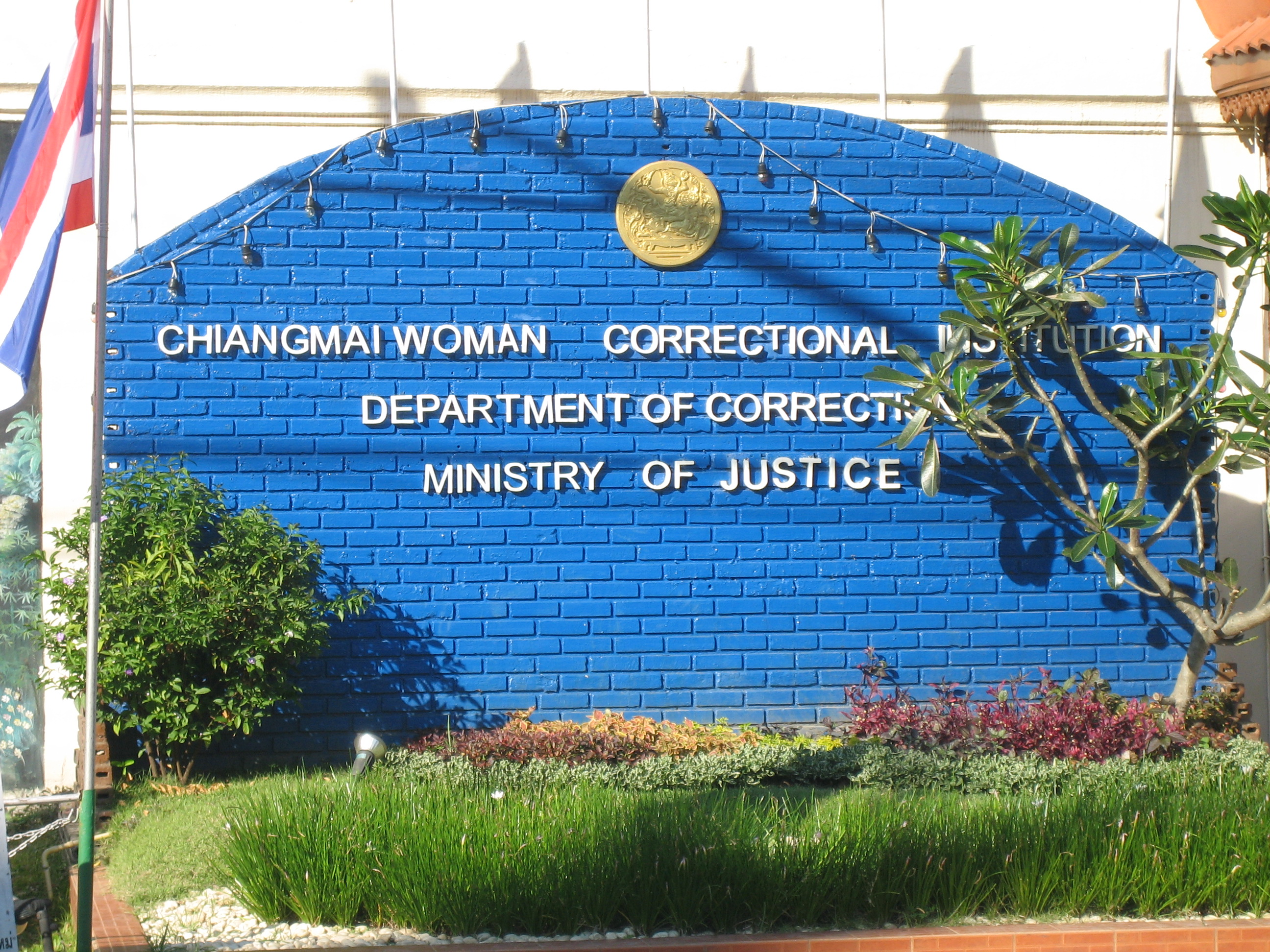
Chiang Mai Women's Correctional Institution

A map of incarceration rates by country

- Despite its population of only 70 million, Thailand ranks sixth in the world in prison population.
- Thailand's female incarceration rate is the world's highest at 66.4 female convicts per 100,000 inhabitants.
- The department manages 143 or 144 central prisons, provincial prisons, district prisons and other correctional facilities across Thailand, housing some 45,796 female (13.7 percent) and 288,483 male prisoners. Overcrowding has been reported at 143 prisons. The official capacity of all Thai prisons was 217,000 as of September 2015. By early 2020 the prison population had grown to 374,052 inmates, 288,648 of them drug offenders. Various remedies have been put forth to lower the prison population. Among them are fines or rehabilitation programs in lieu of prison time, community service in lieu of fines, ankle monitor home confinement, decriminalization of marijuana, and more suspended sentences.
- Overcrowded prisons result in meager food rations for inmates. The prison food and cooking gas budget in place since 2013 is 49 baht per day per inmate, but is capped at an average prison population of 190,200, far fewer than the more than 350,000 inmates held in June 2018. Many prisoners find it hard live on only state-provided food so, if they can afford it, they are permitted to spend up to 300 baht per day in prison shops.
- Eight of Thailand's prisons have all-female inmate populations. The remaining prisons have both male and female inmates, kept segregated in separate zones. Transsexuals number about 4,500 in Thai prisons. They are housed with male inmates, but some have separate sleeping quarters.
- According to the Department of Corrections, more than half of those incarcerated are there for an "offense against narcotics law". Some news reports say that the percentage is closer to 80 percent. The number is January 2020 is 288,648 drug offenders out of 374,052 total inmates, or 77 percent.
- Foreigners accounted for 4.6 percent of the prison population in September 2016. As of January 2020, 14,275 foreign inmates from 103 countries were held in Thai prisons.
- Thailand's incarceration rate is 445 per 100,000 inhabitants (July 2017).
- In 2018, the DOC signed an agreement with Krung Thai Bank (KTB) to provide bank accounts to prisoners. In a trial run, up to 10,000 prisoners will be permitted to use KTB accounts for ATM withdrawals and e-banking. If successful, the program will be rolled out to all prisons. Until now, prison wardens have managed deposits from relatives of prisoners, enabling them to buy items ranging from soap to snacks at prison shops. The new program will remove wardens from inmate financial transactions, as some wardens have been accused of siphoning money from prisoner accounts. In one case, it is alleged that a 500 baht commission was taken by prison management from a 3,000 baht transaction.
- In 2015, the recidivism rate of Thai prisoners was 17 percent. In 2016 that rate rose to 25 percent and 33 percent in 2017. Most were imprisoned more than once for drug-related crimes. Of Thailand's roughly 350,000 prisoners, 180,000 of them first-time offenders, 60,000 second-time offenders and 15,000 third-time offenders. In some prisons, like Rayong Central Prison, about 90 percent of inmates are jailed for drug offences.

== Facilities ==
- Bang Kwang Central Prison
- Central Women's Correctional Institution
- Chiang Mai Women's Correctional Institution
- Chiang Rai Central Prison* (* signifies model women's prison)
- Chonburi Women's Correctional Institution*
- Fang District Prison*
- Klongpai Central Prison
- Klong Prem Central Prison*
- Lang Suan Prison, Chumphon Province
- Nakhon Ratchasima Women's Correctional Institution
- Phitsanulok Women's Correctional Institution*
- Phra Nakon Si Ayutthaya Provincial Prison*
- Rayong Central Prison
- Samut Sakhon Central Prison*
- Songkhla Women's Correctional Institution
- Tak Central Prison*
- Thanya Buri Women's Penitentiary*
- Thon Buri Women's Correctional Institution
- Women's Correctional Institution for Drug Addicts

Bang Kwang houses Thailand's death row for men and execution chamber. The Klong Prem (Lard Yao) section for women houses female death row inmates.

=== Overcrowding ===
The International Committee of the Red Cross (ICRC) puts the minimum space requirement for inmate accommodation at 3.4 m^{2} per person in a shared or dormitory accommodation. The Department of Corrections has three different inmate space standards for its prisons: the "standard capacity" spacing regulation is 2.25 m^{2} floor space for each prisoner. "Full capacity" spacing is 1.1 m^{2} per female inmate, 1.2 m^{2} per male inmate. "Full capacity 30%" sets the spacing at 0.85 m^{2} per inmate. These guidelines allow the DOC to manipulate prison occupancy numbers. When the Director-General of the Department of Corrections says—as he did in December 2019—that the 700,000 inmates behind bars are three times the capacity of the prisons it is unclear which capacity standard he is using. In December 2019, a video was released on YouTube showing a crowded cell at the Lang Suan Prison in Chumphon Province. Justice Minister Somsak Thepsuthin's response was to tell the prison to file a police complaint of an alleged hacking of the video system. He directed the Department of Special Investigation (DSI) to find out how it happened and who was responsible on the grounds that the leak may have violated the rights of inmates. Somsak's attitude has changed somewhat when he realised—as he put it—that some inmates have "...less room for a body [to sleep in] than the inside of a coffin,..."

=== LGBT facility ===
The Department of Corrections is moving towards separating lesbian, gay, bisexual, and transgender (LGBT) prisoners from other prisoners to ensure their safety and security. Min Buri Prison will be used as a prison for LGBT prisoners under a pilot scheme. There are 4,448 prisoners self-identified as LGBT: 2,258 females, 2,156 males, and 34 transgender individuals. LGBT inmates account for about one percent of Thailand's total of 300,000 prisoners.

== Death penalty ==
Thailand, as of 2018, is one of 58 nations that retain the death penalty. Of the 10 ASEAN nations, only Cambodia and the Philippines have outlawed it.

Thailand retains the death penalty, but rarely employs it. Since 1935 Thailand has executed 326 persons, 319 by firing squad (the last was shot on 11 December 2003), and seven by lethal injection, the latest on 19 June 2018. As of January 2019, 517 persons remain on death row. Bang Khwang Central Prison contains the nation's primary Death Row, but Death Rows exist in provincial prisons, for both men and women. As of October 2019, 59 women are on death row, 58 of them for drug-related offenses.

Even after the Supreme Court has handed down a death sentence, under Thai law it can be stayed by the king if a petition is sent to the palace within 60 days. The king can then ponder the petition indefinitely. King Bhumibol (Rama IX), effectively halted executions in Thailand for nearly a decade by this means. Petitions submitted by condemned prisoners were left unanswered by the palace, leading prison officials to regard them as "under royal deliberation". They did not dare put petitioners to death lest they were seen as intruding on royal prerogative. More than 500 death row inmates were thus spared death. On the other hand, when the king rejects clemency petitions, the prisoner must be put to death within 24 hours.

Thai public opinion on the death penalty is unclear. A 2014 survey reported that only eight percent of the population favored its abolition. Another survey indicated that 41 percent wanted to retain the death penalty as a sentencing option. Prime Minister Prayut Chan-o-cha has said that the death penalty is necessary to maintain peace and order and deter severe crimes in spite of general acknowledgement that the possibility of execution does not serve to deter crime.

== Parole ==
The corrections department has three criteria for granting parole to inmates:

- Exhibiting good behaviour
- Performing community service, e.g., repairing roads, dredging canals
- Royal pardon

Two conditions are attached: The inmate must have served at least six months of an ordinary sentence, or—if sentenced to life—the inmate must have served at least 10 years of that sentence. One serial killer was originally sentenced to death in 2005. He confessed to the crime, thus resulting in the commutation of his sentence to life. He then served 14 years of his life sentence and during that time received four sentence reductions for good behaviour. He was then granted parole on a "special national occasion." Seven months after he was paroled he committed murder and was rearrested.

== See also ==
- Bajrakitiyabha, Thai princess active in prison reform
- Bangkok Rules
- Standard Minimum Rules for the Treatment of Prisoners
- Klongpai Central Prison
- Klong Prem Central Prison
