= Bang Kwang Central Prison =

Prison in Nonthaburi, Thailand

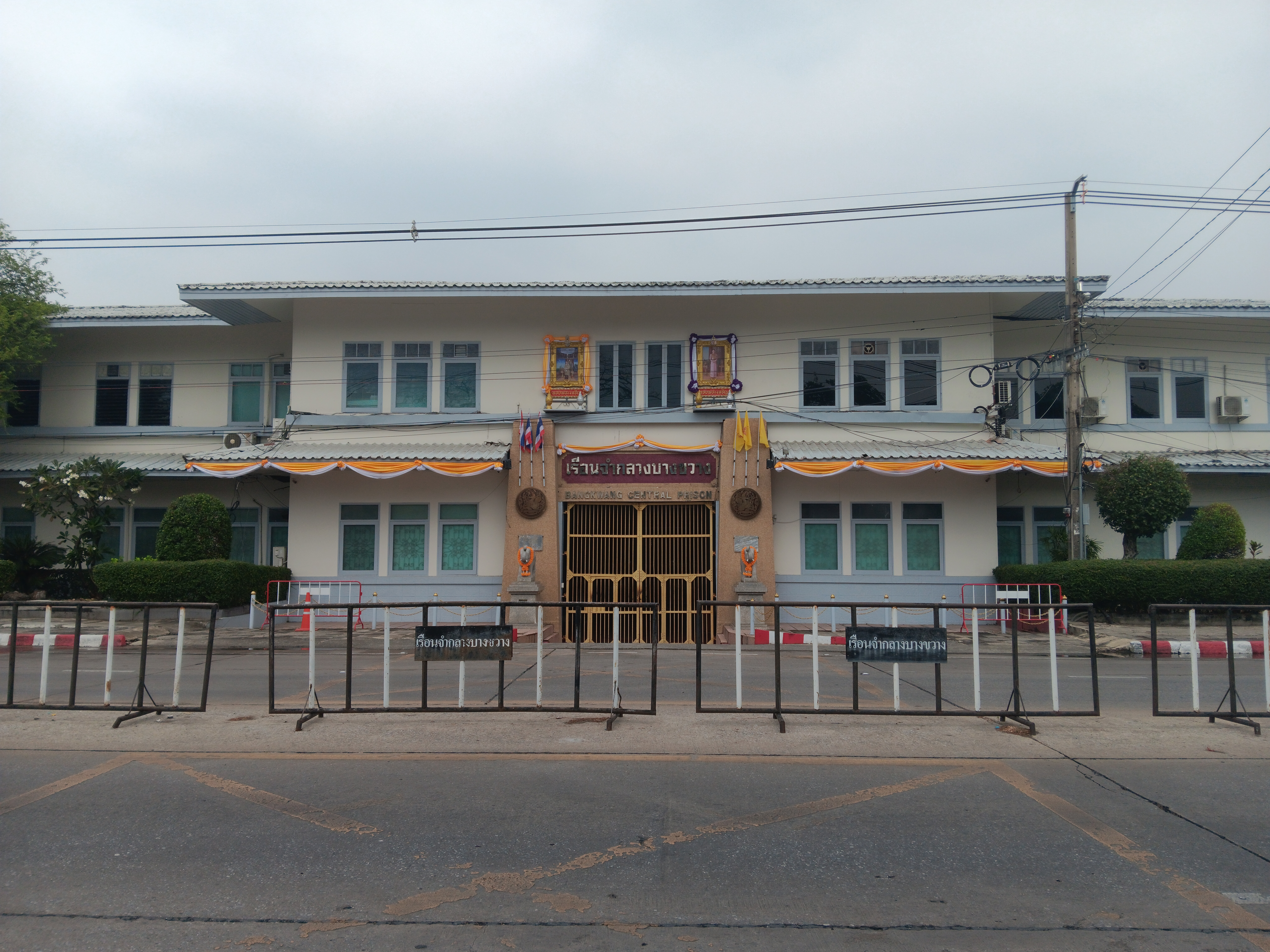
- Interactive map of Bang Kwang Central Prison
- Location: Nonthaburi, Thailand; 13°50′48″N 100°29′35″E
- Status: Operational
- Security class: Maximum security
- Opened: 1933
- Managed by: Thai Department of Corrections

Bang Kwang Central Prison (Thai: เรือนจำกลางบางขวาง; RTGS: Rueancham Klang Bang Khwang) is a men's prison in Nonthaburi Province, Thailand, on the Chao Phraya River, about 11 km north of Bangkok. It is a part of the Department of Corrections. Bang Kwang is the site of the men's death row. As of 2018, the prison had about 6,000 inmates.

== Background ==
Bang Kwang is a men's prison about 11 km north of Bangkok, in Thailand. It houses many foreign prisoners, long-sentence inmates, and it contains Thailand's primary men's death row and execution chamber. All prisoners are required to wear leg irons for the first three months of their sentences. Until 2013, death row inmates were required to have their leg irons permanently welded on. In his 1997 book, The Damage Done, former prisoner and drug courier Warren Fellows recounts that the institution was nicknamed "Big Tiger" by Thai people, because it "prowled and ate". Fellows's associate Paul Hayward also served part of his sentence there.

== History ==
Bang Kwang Central Prison was established by King Chulalongkorn, when he moved the country's primary detention centre away from Bangkok. He ordered the acquisition of land on the east bank of the Chao Phraya River in Bang Kwang subdistrict, Talat Khwan district, Nonthaburi province. Construction did not begin until late 1927, however, under the reign of King Vajiravudh. The facility was designed as a maximum-security prison, featuring a 30-metre central observation tower and 20 guard towers along a 6-metre-high wall. In 1931, with most of the construction completed, the government relocated inmates to Bang Kwang, naming it Rueancham Kong Mahantathot (Thai: prison for serious offenders). The name was changed to its current one by the Ministry of Interior in 1942.

== Death penalty ==
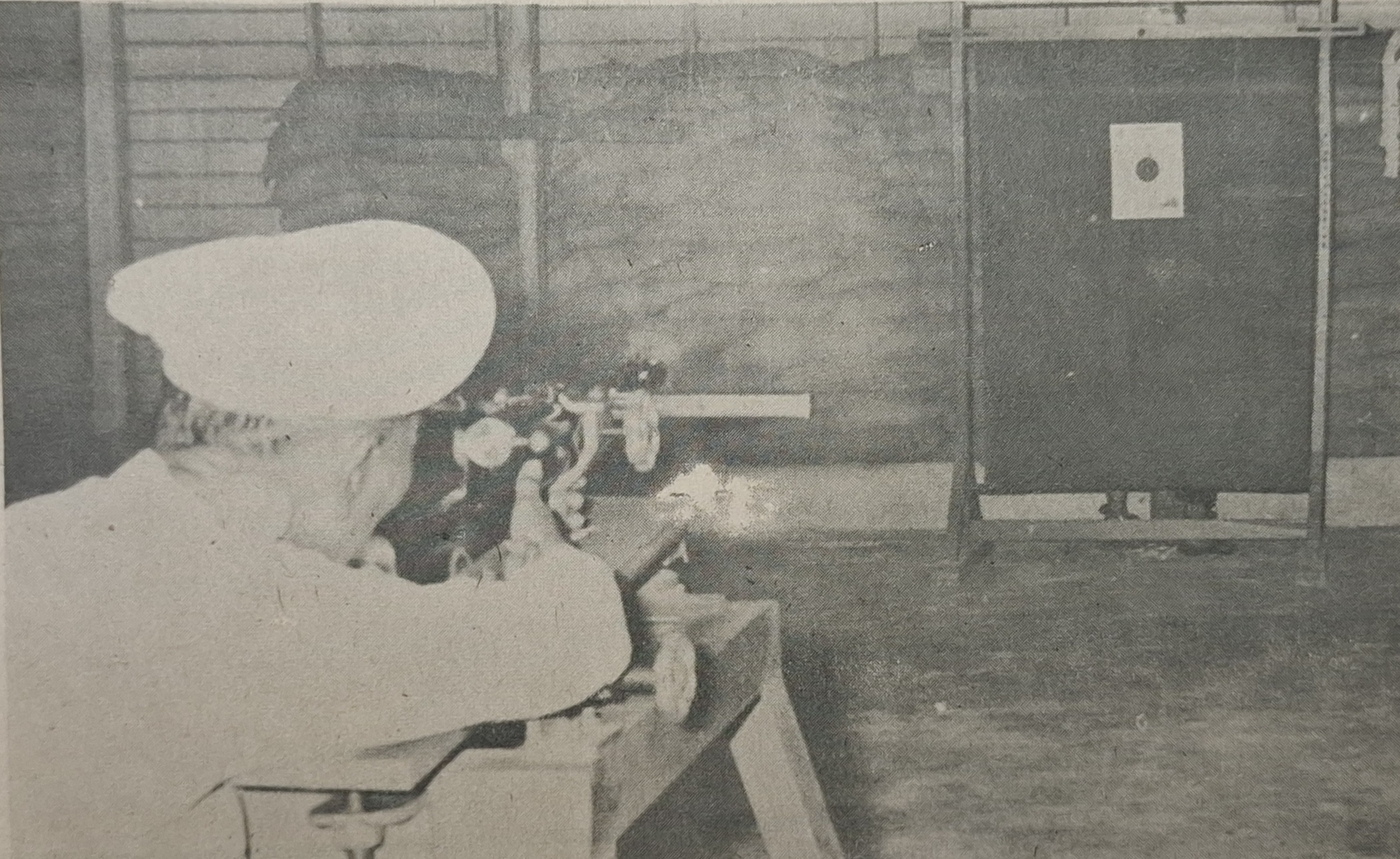
1972 execution

The first execution at Bang Kwang Central Prison took place on 12 July 1937, when Khian Bunkanson was executed by shooting for conspiracy to murder.

When Thailand switched its execution method to lethal injection in 2003, a dedicated chamber was built for it at Bang Kwang and has been in use since 2008.

== Notable foreign inmates ==
In 1978, the Australian drug smuggler Warren Fellows was incarcerated at Bang Kwang, having received a life sentence. He was granted a royal pardon and was released in 1990. His compatriot and accomplice Paul Hayward, a former rugby league footballer, spent a decade at the institution and was set free in 1989.

Jonathan Wheeler, a British man arrested for drug smuggling in Thailand in 1994, served 16 months in Klong Prem Central Prison, before being moved to Bang Kwang when he received a 50-year sentence. Wheeler would go on to become one of the longest-serving Western inmates in Thai prison after spending more than 18 years behind bars. He chronicled his story in the book The Tiger Cage: 18 Years in Thai Prison.

In 1995, the Briton Alan John Davies was the first European to receive a death sentence in Thailand, being held at Bang Kwang. He was freed after 17 years of "hell", returning to the UK in 2007 after being granted amnesty by the Thai king.

== See also ==
- Bangkok Hilton
