= Martine Griffiths =

Martine Harte
- Born: Martine Griffiths; Melbourne, Victoria, Australia
- Occupation: Journalist
- Spouse: Erin Harte (m. 2005)
- Children: 3
- Awards: 2005 Gold Quill Award for excellence in Victorian journalism
- Website: engagingwomen.com.au

Martine Harte (née Griffiths) is an Australian news reporter and winner of the Melbourne Press Club's 2005 "Tattersalls Gold Quill Award" for excellence in Victorian journalism.

The judges said she showed great initiative and determination to obtain exclusive information and security footage of the arrest of members of the Bali Nine with drugs strapped to their body.

She won a "Best TV Report" award for the same story and was nominated for a 2006 "TV Week Logie Award". Beginning her career in television journalism in 1997 in Victoria's Latrobe Valley and Albury for WIN TV, Griffiths was soon offered a position as an on-air reporter for Network Ten.

She's covered national stories including the Schapelle Corby drug smuggling trial, the 2002 Commonwealth Games in Manchester, and court appearances of the Australian embassy bombers in Jakarta.

She was the first Australian television reporter to gain access to Kerobokan Prison and speak for several hours with the Corby sisters.

Martine has been a guest on 774 ABC Melbourne's Conversation Hour and has contributed to other radio broadcasts.

In 2013 she founded Australian women's website engagingwomen.com.au.

Martine is married to Erin Harte. They have three children and live in Melbourne Australia.
