= Schapelle =

Schapelle can refer to:

- Schapelle Corby, an Australian woman convicted of drug smuggling in Indonesia
- Schapelle (film), a television film about convicted drug smuggler Schapelle Corby
- Ganja Queen, a documentary about Schapelle Corby also subtitled Schapelle Corby: The Hidden Truth
