= Michelle Leslie =

Australian interior designer, model (born 1981)

- Born: 1981 (age 44–45); Adelaide, South Australia
- Other name: Michelle Lee
- Occupations: Model, interior designer

Michelle Leslie (born 1981), who previously worked under the name Michelle Lee, is an Australian former model. Leslie worked as a catwalk model in 2000, working for stores including David Jones. That same year, she was a finalist on the television series Search for a Supermodel and the runner-up for Miss World Australia.

In 2005, Leslie was arrested in Bali after police reported discovering two ecstasy tablets in her handbag. She was convicted and sentenced to three months' imprisonment. Upon returning to Australia, Leslie stated police had planted the drugs in her bag and then demanded a US$25,000 bribe to avoid going to prison, which she could not afford to pay. While in custody, Leslie dressed in Islamic clothing, stating she did so to shield herself from both the media and sexual assault from corrections officers. The decision faced a backlash from some Muslims, who accused her of using Islam as a stunt to gain the court's favour. Leslie's arrest and her choice of clothing in custody resulted in considerable attention from the Australian media.

After returning to Australia, Leslie travelled to Cambodia to help raise money for local orphanages. She returned to the catwalk in Australia in 2006, but struggled to find regular work as a model following the publicity from her arrest. In 2007, she launched a line of clothing for dogs, and the following year, began a career as an interior designer.

== Early career ==
Michelle Leslie was born in Adelaide, South Australia, to Albert and Violeta Leslie. Violeta was a nurse and one of 12 siblings born in the Philippines. Albert played for the Australian basketball team, and met Violeta while on a layover in the Philippines before travelling to the Olympics. Violeta emigrated to Australia, and Albert went on to become an assistant coach to the Adelaide 36ers. A self-confessed tomboy when young, Leslie was educated at Sacred Heart College, Adelaide, and became interested in modelling only after her father gave her a course at a modelling school as a 15th birthday present. She enjoyed it enough to undertake a second course, and shortly thereafter left school in order to pursue a full-time modelling career. She soon emerged as one of the "most prominent catwalk and catalogue models" in Adelaide, working for stores such as David Jones, Harris Scarfe and Myer.

In 2000, she appeared as one of the 20 finalists in the first series of the Australian Search for a Supermodel reality show, and was first runner-up in the 2000 Miss World Australia pageant held in Darwin. She was "catapulted on to the international catwalk" when Asian Australian models became in demand. As a result, she gained work within Asia, appearing under the name "Michelle Lee". She also moved to New York temporarily in 2003 for modelling opportunities. Off the catwalks she gained prominence as one of the two models involved in a 2004 advertising campaign for Antz Pantz underwear and, prior to this, as the face of the Crystelle lingerie brand.

== Arrest and trial ==
On 21 August 2005, Leslie was travelling in a vehicle to an open-air dance party at Garuda Wisnu Kencana Cultural Park on the Indonesian island of Bali. Police stopped the vehicle and reported discovering two pills in Leslie's handbag. Forensic tests subsequently found the pills to be the drug ecstasy. Urine tests conducted at the time of her arrest showed no evidence of the use of the drug; a later blood test found traces of amphetamines. According to Indonesian police, Leslie stated the pills were given to her by a friend, "Mia". Mia was later revealed to be Nameera Azmaan, who was also a model based in Singapore and working for Chic Management, the same agency Leslie worked for. Leslie denied making the allegation, and Azmaan also denied any involvement. Leslie denied other statements attributed to her by police reports, including that she had been taking ecstasy for a year and could not enjoy parties without it. Police reports also stated she declared her religion as Christianity upon her arrest.

According to Balinese newspapers, Leslie was arrested while in the company of a son of the then Coordinating Minister for the Economy Aburizal Bakrie and two unidentified men, one said to be the son of a man with "strong influence in the law and justice system". Police gave "vague and contradicting" reports regarding who Leslie was with when she was arrested, with media alleging this was an attempt to protect their identities. Leslie was one of five people arrested by police during their raid that night; according to Leslie's lawyers, two of the people arrested quickly bribed their way out of any further trouble.

The incident marked the third arrest of Australians in Bali on drugs charges in twelve months following the Schapelle Corby and Bali Nine cases, and resulted in considerable media attention. Her arrest prompted then Australian Foreign Affairs Minister Alexander Downer to warn Australians about the dangers of drug possession while travelling in Asia, and led then Australian Prime Minister John Howard to comment that Australians caught with drugs "can't expect the Government to bail them out."

In October 2005, it was reported that Leslie's lawyers had provided a report from a Sydney doctor stating that Leslie was addicted to prescription medication. Under Indonesian law this would allow her to be tried as a "user"; the maximum sentence for a user is three months' imprisonment, whereas the maximum penalty for possession is 15 years. Leslie was tried in the Denpasar District Court, and was found guilty of using a prohibited substance on 18 November. She was ordered to pay court costs and sentenced to three months in jail but, due to the three months already spent in custody, was freed from Kerobokan Prison on 19 November. She was deported from the country due to her conviction. Leslie flew out of Bali to Singapore, where she spent time with friends and family before returning to Sydney.

=== Return to Australia ===
Professor Catharine Lumby, then head of media studies at the University of Sydney, said many Australians would have sympathy for Leslie, and predicted she would be highly sought out by companies for modelling after returning to Australia, as she would be perceived as a "cult figure". Leslie declined to sell her story upon her return to Australia, on the grounds she believed she would face further criticism for profiting from the ordeal. She instead gave unpaid interviews to 60 Minutes and New Idea, the latter of whom donated money to a Cambodian orphanage she was raising funds for; Leslie received an AU$70,000 payment from New Idea for an interview while she was still in prison prior to being convicted.

In the 60 Minutes interview, Leslie professed her innocence, noting that she had been detained for several minutes at the police road block and would have had plenty of time to better conceal or throw away two ecstasy tablets. She instead freely gave her handbag to police on request, whom she accused of planting the drugs and then demanding a US$25,000 bribe to make the charges disappear. Leslie believes police targeted her on the belief she was wealthy and well connected because she was a model; her parents had to mortgage their home to help pay her legal fees, which came close to AU$300,000. Leslie states police tampered with her blood to make it test positive for drugs in front of her and her lawyer, and mocked her when she protested. Her lawyer subsequently advised her to plead guilty, saying that such tactics were commonly used by police in Bali and she would likely spend 15 years in prison if she maintained her innocence.

=== Conversion to Islam ===
During her incarceration, Leslie announced through a spokesman that she had converted to the Islamic faith eighteen months prior to her arrest. Leslie chose to wear a burqa on one occasion when she appeared in court, and opted to wear Islamic dress, such as a hijab, until she was released. Her conversion and choice of dress sparked debate among Australian Muslims, some of whom accused her of using Islam as a stunt to gain the court's favour. Her lawyer offered an apology to any Muslims who were offended, saying that Leslie had worn the clothes to avoid unwanted attention from the prison guards and journalists. Professor Tim Lindsey, then director of the Asian Law Centre at the University of Melbourne, stated that wearing Islamic clothing would make no sense as a legal defence, as Indonesian prisons were full of "Muslims convicted by Muslims". Criticism also emerged when she was seen wearing tight-fitting clothing on her departure from the prison. After her release Leslie stated she had no regrets regarding how she conducted herself in prison, though apologised for any offence caused by wearing the burqa.

The Australian Federation of Islamic Councils initially stated they had no problem with Leslie being a Muslim; their president Ameer Ali recommended that she refrain from returning to her former career as "a model for lingerie and underwear" after returning to Australia, as such behaviour was "not allowed in Islam". In the 60 Minutes interview, Leslie stated she wore Islamic clothing because she was afraid of being sexually assaulted by male prison guards, and to protect herself when she faced the media. When asked if she had even been a Muslim, she replied "Yeah, but I don't really know what makes you or not makes you a Muslim. I'm not a practising Muslim, no." Following the 60 Minutes interview, Leslie's former friend Norah Cullen told journalists Leslie fabricated the story about being a Muslim, and only wore the burqa to conceal her face from the media. Cullen, a Muslim herself, had previously told journalists Leslie's conversion to Islam was genuine.

== Later career ==
Upon her return to Australia, Leslie left her then modelling agency, Chic Management, to sign with Max Markson. Shortly thereafter she travelled to Cambodia to help raise money for the charity Krousar Thmey, meeting with King Norodom Sihamoni and spending time in local orphanages. Leslie arrived back in Australia shortly before Australian Fashion Week, and returned to the catwalk there for the first time in April 2006, modelling swimwear for designer Michael Azzollini.

Leslie had several modelling jobs after returning to Australia, but struggled to find steady work as a model. In 2007, she launched a range of clothing for dogs, "Miyow & Barkley". Working with her friend Traci Griffith, they experienced early success when their first range of clothing and accessories sold out shortly after being launched. In 2008, she launched an interior design business, Michelle Leslie Studio. Leslie spent much of 2020 and 2021 in Hawaii doing interior design and renovating for a luxury home owned by John Singleton. In 2023, she was hired to do interior design for a $15.8 million property owned by Singleton in Killcare Heights, New South Wales.

== Personal life ==
In September 2003, Leslie began a relationship with Scott Sutton, heir to the Suttons Holden chain of Holden dealerships in Sydney. Leslie separated from Sutton in July 2007, and began dating magazine publisher Adam Zammit the following month. Leslie and Zammit were married in New Zealand in October 2012, but separated two years later. In October 2016 she met singer Daniel Johns via a mutual friend. Following months of media speculation as to whether they were dating, the couple went public with their relationship in July 2017. The couple split in 2019. Leslie is known for keeping her personal life private. She had her first child at 42 though declined to reveal the identify of the child's father to the media.

In September 2025, Police arrested Leslie for assault at the home she shared with her partner, cinematographer Thomaz Labanca, following reports of a domestic incident. The court granted an interim apprehended violence order against Leslie. The matter is scheduled to be heard in court in May 2026.
