= Australia–Indonesia prisoner exchange agreement negotiations =

Although there is an extradition agreement and a 'Treaty of Mutual Assistance on Criminal Matters' between Australia and Indonesia, there is currently no formal agreement for prisoner transfer between the two countries. An Australian prisoner under sentence in Indonesia must serve their entire sentence there, and vice versa.

== Course of negotiations ==
Justice authorities of both countries have been in negotiations since April 2005 to forge a mutually acceptable Agreement.

In June 2006, Indonesia's Minister of Law and Human Rights Hamid Awaluddin stated that he and Phillip Ruddock, Australia's attorney general were 'in full agreement' about the content of a proposed agreement.

Australian Justice Minister Chris Ellison had sought agreement by September 2006 and has speculated upon a completion date of early 2007 with the first prisoner transfers to occur soon after. However, a draft provided by him to the Indonesian Ministry of Justice and Human Rights was deemed unacceptable in late December 2006.

The majority of Indonesian nationals in Australian prisons are in custody for illegal immigration or illegal fishing, while there are eleven Australians in Indonesian prisons on drug offences. There are between 40 and 50 Indonesians in Australian prisons.

Australian Attorney-General, Philip Ruddock, revealed on 6 March 2007 that discussions over the minimum time prisoners must serve in the country where they were sentenced had been largely resolved. Prisoners would have to serve at least half of their sentence in the jurisdiction in which they were committed.

In reference to Schapelle Corby being treated for depression in May 2009, foreign minister Stephen Smith said that the end to negotiations between Australia and Indonesia was not yet in sight.

== See also ==
- Australia–Indonesia relations
- Foreign relations of Australia
- Foreign relations of Indonesia
- List of Australians imprisoned or executed abroad
- Bali Nine
- Schapelle Corby
