= Michaël Blanc =

French chef and drug trafficker

Michael Blanc
- Born: 1974; Bonneville, France
- Occupations: Chef, Interior Decorator
- Status: Paroled
- Penalty: Life imprisonment

Michaël Loïc Blanc (born 1974) is a French chef who was convicted of drug trafficking in Indonesia after 3.8 kilograms of hashish was found in his diving gear when he attempted to re-enter Bali, Indonesia, in December 1999.

Sentenced to life imprisonment, he served 14 years in Cipinang prison, Jakarta. His case, which has been compared to imprisoned Australian tourist Schapelle Corby, received media coverage by both the French and Indonesian press, and was featured on prime time news shows Sept à huit and Tout le monde en parle in France.

== Early life and arrest ==
The youngest of three children, Michael Blanc was born in 1974 to Jean-Claude Blanc and Hélène Le Touzey in Bonneville in the department of Haute-Savoie in southeastern France. Leaving France in 1993, Blanc travelled to Senegal in West Africa and later spent time in the Caribbean, Greece, India, Malaysia and Thailand working at various times as a chef and interior decorator during the 1990s.

Blanc had been living in Bali, Indonesia for a year when, after returning from a trip to India, he was detained by immigration officials at Ngurah Rai Airport on 26 December 1999. A bag in his possession containing two diving tanks was inspected after having gone through an X-ray machine. Blanc gave his consent to have his luggage checked by police dogs. Drilling open the tanks, officials found a total of 189 rolls and 178 tablets of hashish, weighing 3.8 kilograms, in the diving tanks.

Interviewed by investigators of the Directorate General of Customs, Blanc denied any knowledge of the drugs claiming the diving tanks belonged to an acquaintance named Philip, a Frenchman of Israeli descent who lived in Paris. Having met at a café in Seminyak, Bali, the two travelled to India and, on their return to Bali, Philip had disappeared after they had arrived at the airport. However, during the interview, Blanc was unable to provide sufficient evidence to satisfactorily identify Philip.

== Trial and conviction ==
Arrested by the Denpasar police, Blanc was held in their detention center where he met with his lawyer Dwi Surya Adibudi SH. The French Honorary Consul in Bali contacted his family and, in August 2000, his mother Hélène was granted a leave of absence from her accounting job and flew to Bali to attend her son's trial.

During the trial, Blanc's lawyer argued that there had been a breach of procedure by airport officials. He pointed out that Blanc was not searched in the same room as the evidence in question, and was not provided a French-speaking interpreter during his interview with officials. Blanc had also asked police to check the tanks for fingerprints; however, they had failed to comply with his request.

While prosecutors had called for the death penalty in this case, the Denpasar court found Blanc guilty of drug trafficking and sentenced him to life in prison on 16 November 2000. He was imprisoned in Kerobokan Prison on Bali, then was transferred to Madiun, East Java and finally jailed in Cipinang, Jakarta, Indonesia.

== Appeal and public outcry ==
Immediately after the conviction, both Adibudi and the prosecution unsuccessfully appealed the judge's decision to the Denpasar Appellate Court.

Hélène Le Touzey continued to campaign for her son's release and appealed to the Indonesian Supreme Court. Blanc's conviction was upheld and, in addition, he was fined an $70,000 on 14 June 2001. During the appeal, a French government official had told Le Touzey that it would cost her between ₣800,000 and ₣1,000,000 (roughly $US203,000–$US254,000) to secure a reduced sentence for Blanc; however, she refused to pay.

The French Foreign Ministry made diplomatic requests for Blanc's extradition and, in January 2005, French President Jacques Chirac asked Indonesian Foreign Minister Hassan Wirajuda about the possibility of moving Blanc to a French prison while Hassan was speaking at a hearing with the House of Representatives' Commission I. His sentence was reduced to 20 years in 2008.

=== Release and parole ===
On 20 January 2014 Blanc was freed and paroled from the prison but stayed in Indonesia until his final release date of 21 July 2018, as stipulated in his parole agreement. He subsequently returned to France.
