= Ron Bakir =

Australian businessman

Ron Bakir is a Lebanese entrepreneur from Queensland, Australia. Bakir is the founder and CEO of HomeCorp Group.

== Early life ==
Bakir was born in Lebanon in 1977.

In 1995, at the age of 17, Bakir established the mobile phone chain Crazy Ron's in Queensland, Australia. Crazy Ron’s entered into voluntary administration after declaring insolvency in early April 2005 after a legal battle with a Crazy John's.

In 2013, Bakir was awarded the Gold Coast Young Entrepreneur of the Year due to his success with HomeCorp.

In 2015 Ron was nominated for the prestigious Executive of the Year Awards held by The CEO Magazine.

== HomeCorp Group ==
Bakir founded HomeCorp Property Group in 2004. HomeCorp is a private urban development company headquartered on the Gold Coast, Queensland. HomeCorp began as a company delivering small home and land projects to Australian property investors and has grown to achieve over $1 billion in accumulated sales since 2004 across more than 15 projects.

Bakir was awarded the Gold Coast Entrepreneur of the Year Award in 2013 for his leadership of the HomeCorp Property Group. The awards are judged by Business News Publications and aim to recognise young business owners operating in the Gold Coast region aged 40 or under.

In 2013, the Rockhampton Regional Council approved plans for 950 residential lots in the community currently known as the ‘Pineapple Patch', with HomeCorp announcing a $500 million project in the location. In 2014 HomeCorp started its construction division HomeCorp Constructions.

In 2016 HomeCorp entered into a partnership with the Queensland- based developer Sunland Group to deliver 700 homes in the Gold Coast. In 2017 HomeCorp was named in Westpac Bank’s 200 Businesses of Tomorrow leadership list.”

== Association with Schapelle Corby ==
In 2005, Bakir donated an undisclosed sum of money to the legal defence of Schapelle Corby.

Bakir retained the services of the Australian law firm Hoolihans to "Investigate the claim and gather evidence, provide advice in respect of the claim, attend to all procedures necessary for the disclosure by Australian or other bodies of information relevant to the defence, including attendance at conferences with representatives of such bodies, appearing before the media or presenting press releases which may assist the matter, issue Court proceedings if necessary, assist in attending to all pre-trial preparation, engage counsel and other experts, attend at trial as necessary and attend to all such other matters as required."

Bakir claims to have no relationship to Corby other than being from the same city. He reportedly decided to help fund Corby's defence because he believed that a miscarriage of justice could occur if she were not properly represented. He pledged A$100,000 towards the A$1,000,000 reward fund, but the full reward was never raised.

Before the prosecution announced their sentencing recommendation, Bakir accused the prosecution team (chief prosecutor Ida Bagus Wiswantanu) of seeking a bribe to reduce the requested sentence. The prosecution team and the Indonesian government vehemently denied that this had occurred. Bakir quickly issued a written apology to Indonesian authorities for his statements.

After her sentencing, Corby sacked her main Indonesian defence lawyer, Lily Lubis, and Indonesian case co-ordinator Vasu Rasiah in July 2005, when Australian lawyer Mark Trowell QC told the media that Rasiah had asked him to request A$500,000 from the Australian government, money meant to bribe the judges of the appeal court.

Bakir registered a company titled Schapelle Corby Pty Ltd, stating that he wanted to protect her name from people who wanted to exploit it. Some raised doubts as to his motives, although Schapelle's cousin, Melissa Younger, told the media that his support was genuine.

In June 2005, Bakir formally ended his involvement in Schapelle's defence, stating that he had done everything in his power to help her, including contributing more than $200,000 to her campaign. By 22 July 2005, Bakir had deregistered both Schapelle Corby Pty Ltd and the schapellecorby.com.au website.

== Philanthropy ==
Bakir donated hundreds of thousands of dollars over the years to the disadvantaged and various charity organisations. In 2016 he donated more than $100,000 to the Big Plates Little Mates Cancer Foundation; $20,000 to the MS Foundation; and $25,000 to the Salvation Army. In 2017 he donated almost $100,000 to the Gold Coast Community Fund.
