= Mercy Campaign =

The Mercy Campaign is an Australian-based campaign focusing on two Australians, Andrew Chan and Myuran Sukumaran, who were on death row in Indonesia for drug trafficking offences as part of the Bali 9. The campaign's goal was to raise awareness of the two Australians' circumstances, and to petition the President of Indonesia to grant the pair clemency. The campaign was founded in 2010 by a group of lawyers and journalists. Andrew Chan and Myuran Sukumaran were executed on 29 April 2015, however the Mercy Campaign continues to raise awareness about death penalty issues worldwide.

== Petition ==
The Mercy Campaign's petition, originally addressed to former Indonesian President Susilo Bambang Yudhoyono, asks incumbent President Joko Widodo to grant clemency, and spare Chan and Sukumaran from the firing squad. The petition highlights their remorse, rehabilitation and positive impact on Kerobokan Prison. The petition also seeks clemency for other prisoners on death row in Indonesia.

On 13 February 2015, the petition, containing 150,000 signatures, was filed with the Indonesian President.

At the time of execution, the Mercy Campaign had obtained 250,000 signatures on its petition.

== January Vigil ==
The campaign hosted a candlelight vigil in Sydney's Martin Place on the evening of 29 January 2015 in support of Chan and Sukumaran. The concert featured performances by Archibald Prize artist Ben Quilty, singer-songwriter Megan Washington, Josh Pyke, Kate Miller-Heidke, Paul Mac, Glenn Richards from Augie March, and The Presets' Julian Hamilton; with Andrew Denton, his partner, Jennifer Byrne, and Missy Higgins who recorded video messages of support for Chan and Sukumaran.

== March Vigil ==
Human rights lawyer Geoffrey Robertson addressed a crowd in Sydney on 28 April, ahead of the planned execution in the early morning on 29 April.
