= Tiah =

Tiah is a given name. Notable people with the name include:

- Tiah Delaney (born 1985), Australian model, presenter, and writer
- Tiah Haynes (born 1993), Australian rules footballer

== See also ==
- Miah
- Tia (name)
