= Janine Hosking =

Australian documentary film maker

Janine Hosking is an Australian documentary film maker. She won a Walkley Award in 1997 for a Seven Network television report titled Tjandamurra, the story of Tjandamurra O'Shane.

Other documentaries include:

- My Khmer Heart. Ikandy Films (2001) – story of an Australian nurse and her work in an orphanage outside Phnom Penh.
- Mademoiselle and the Doctor. Ikandy Films (2004) – story of the suicide of 80-year-old French-Australian woman Lisette Nigot and euthanasia advocate Philip Nitschke. A scene from the film showing the use of a suicide bag was controversially edited from the ABC screening by Compass presenter Geraldine Doogue and was the subject of a separate report on Media Watch.
- With this Ring (2005) – aired on ABC Television's Australian Story
- Ganja Queen (2007) – about the arrest, trial, and imprisonment of Schapelle Corby
- I'm Not Dead Yet (2011) – about Australian country music legend Chad Morgan
- The Lost Diggers of Fromelles (2013)
- 35 Letters (2014)
- Lebanese Beauty Queens (2018)
- The Eulogy (2018, about pianist Geoffrey Tozer)
- Knowing the Score (2023, about conductor Simone Young)
- A Horse Named Winx (2024, about racehorse Winx)
