= Search for a Supermodel =

Australian television program

Search for a Supermodel is a reality television series on Network Ten in Australia that aired from 2000 to 2002 where regional finalists competed for a contract with Ford Models. The winner of each series went on to compete in the international version of the show. The third series had both female and male contestants.

== Series One (2000) ==
=== Contestants ===
- Jill Kellett
- Sophie Barton
- Gail Browne
- Daniela Cristea
- Alana Crossman
- Francesca Elnaugh (winner)
- Sara-Jane Herbert
- Sarah Marie Kamoen
- Jacqui Lawson
- Michelle Lee
- Silvana Lovin
- Parris Maflin
- Rebecca Bull
- Deanna Margaritis
- Amber McGrath
- Genevieve McLeod
- Belinda Melhuish
- Kasia Ozog
- Kathryn John
- Adria Richardson
- Amelie Sauvage
- Cheryl Tay
- Sophie Turner
- Paula Vesely
- Haldaana Wells
- Sydney James
- Sara Wuj
- Tarryn Wilson
- Tarin Mckimmie
- Elouise Yantsch
- Katie Linney
- Kristy Warrick
- Lauren Murray
- Alice Webb
- Shelley Dragun
- Aliera French
- Yin Chiew
- Sommer Shiels

(this is an incomplete list of contestants)

== Series Two (2001) ==
=== Contestants ===
- Akush Atar
- Alysha Rowatt
- Belinda Willsher
- Emily Thorpe
- Gemma Bidstrup (winner)
- Gemma Johnson
- Jessica Elsegood
- Katie Lange
- Kristji Powell
- Laura Midalia
- Pia Loyola (Pia Miller)
- Shadae Magson
- Tahnee O'Shaughnessy
- Dragana Ljubicic
- Laura Spalding

== Series Three (2002) ==
=== Contestants ===
==== Female ====
- Alex Venema
- Amy Brookman
- Anastasia Schrieder
- Anna George
- Emily Stone
- Josephine Wilkins
- Kate O'Connell
- Kate Peck
- Kerry Doyle (People's choice winner)
- Nicole Trunfio (winner)
- Ruby Brown
- Tara Edwards
- Tiah Eckhardt Tiah Delaney
- Vanessa DellaBona

==== Male ====
- David Genat (winner)
- Justin Hogg
- Justin Pearce
- Mark Bendeli
- Matthew Kopp
- Michael Lavens
- Ross Laurence
- Ryan Sathre
- Scott Hansen
- Simon Pocock
- Zen Crosby

== See also ==
- America's Next Top Model
- Australia's Next Top Model
