= Lindsay Sandiford =

British drug trafficker

- Born: Lindsay Sandiford; 25 June 1956 (age 70)
- Citizenship: British
- Occupations: Legal secretary, manager
- Children: 2
- Status: Released in 2025
- Conviction: Drug trafficking
- Penalty: Death by firing squad

Lindsay Sandiford (born 25 June 1956) is a British former legal secretary and convicted drug smuggler who was sentenced to death in January 2013 by a court in Indonesia after being found guilty of smuggling cocaine into Bali. Although death is the maximum punishment for drug-related offences under Indonesian law, the severity of the sentence was greeted with shock because prosecutors had not recommended the death penalty for Sandiford. The ruling was also condemned by the British Government and anti-death penalty campaigners.

Sandiford was arrested on 19 May 2012 after arriving at the island's Ngurah Rai International Airport on a flight from Bangkok, Thailand, when a routine luggage search uncovered the drugs. Under subsequent police interrogation, she claimed to have been coerced into carrying the drugs by a criminal gang that had made threats against her family, and took part in a sting operation to arrest several other individuals she alleged to be part of a drug trafficking ring. In December 2012 she was convicted of drug smuggling at Denpasar District Court and sentenced to death by firing squad in January 2013. Others involved in the case were convicted of lesser drug-related offences and received custodial sentences. Prosecutors had recommended that Sandiford should also receive a custodial sentence because of her willingness to cooperate with police, but the panel of judges overseeing the hearing felt her actions had undermined Indonesia's anti-drugs policy and concluded there were no mitigating circumstances in her favour.

Sandiford subsequently launched an appeal against the court's decision. She had funded her own defence costs during the initial trial but had no money for representation at appeal. Funds were subsequently raised to pay for an appeal lawyer, and the appeals procedure began. In the United Kingdom, lawyers applied to seek a judicial review of the government's stance of not providing financial aid for Britons facing criminal proceedings overseas, but their legal challenge was dismissed by judges at the High Court of England and Wales on the grounds that Sandiford had little chance in successfully appealing the sentence. An appeal arguing the government's position was unlawful was also rejected. The British Government submitted a statement to the court in Bali alleging unlawful behaviour towards Sandiford by officials at the time of her arrest. The High Court in Bali rejected the first stage of Sandiford's appeal in April 2013, upholding the death sentence. An appeal was subsequently lodged with the Indonesian Supreme Court, but in August 2013 this was also rejected. On 21 October 2025, Indonesian authorities announced that Sandiford would be returned to the UK following an agreement. She returned to the UK on 7 November 2025.

== Background and arrest ==
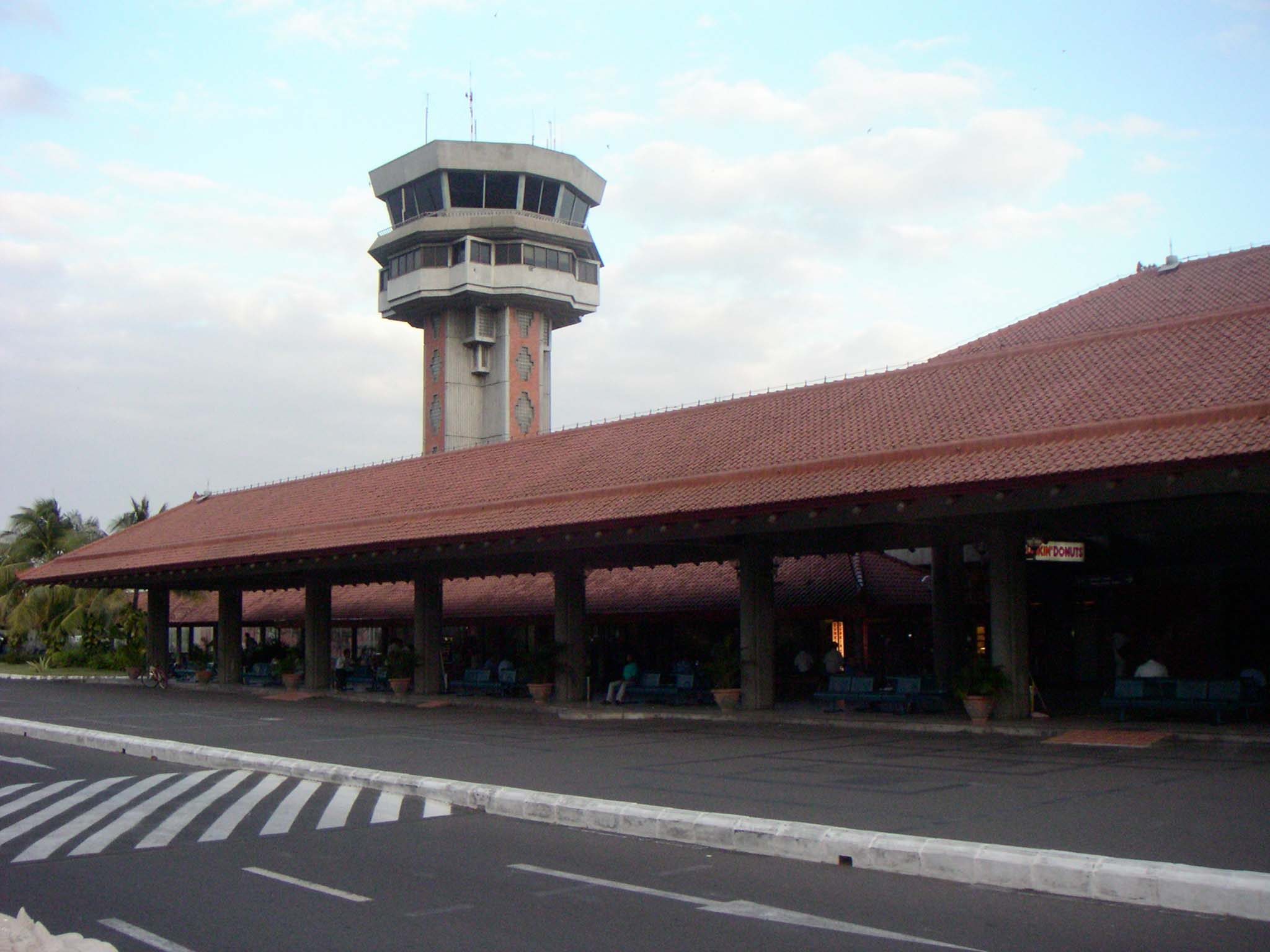
Ngurah Rai International Airport, where Sandiford was arrested after arriving from Bangkok.

Lindsay Sandiford was born on 25 June 1956, and holds British citizenship. A former legal secretary, she worked for many years in management at the Cheltenham-based law firm DTS Legal.

Sandiford was arrested on 19 May 2012 after arriving at Ngurah Rai International Airport in Denpasar, Bali, on a Thai Airways flight from Bangkok, Thailand, when 4.8 kg (11 lb) of cocaine was found in the lining of her suitcase during a routine search. She claimed to have been forced into carrying the drugs by a gang who had threatened to harm members of her family if she did not comply with their demands. When informed she could receive the death penalty for drug trafficking, she told police that she had been asked to carry the drugs for Julian Ponder, a British antiques dealer living in Bali. Rachel Dougall, who shared a property with Ponder, was arrested after a subsequent search of the residence uncovered 48.94 g (1.726 oz) of cocaine, while 3.1 g (0.11 oz) of hashish were found at the house of a fourth individual, Paul Beale. Sandiford and Ponder were charged with drug trafficking.

== Trial and conviction ==
In her defence, Sandiford claimed that she had been pressured into carrying the drugs by a gang who had made threats against her children, while her lawyers argued she was suffering from mental health problems. In a statement to the court she expressed regret over her involvement, "I would like to begin by apologising to the Republic of Indonesia and the Indonesian people for my involvement. I would never have become involved in something like this but the lives of my children were in danger and I felt I had to protect them." Her son gave a statement to the court in which he said he believed she was forced to carry the drugs following a disagreement over rent money she had paid on his behalf. A report by Dr. Jennifer Fleetwood, a lecturer in criminology at the University of Kent and expert on women in the international drugs trade was also presented to the court, suggesting Sandiford was an ideal target for drug traffickers. "There is … evidence to suggest that a trafficker would seek someone who was vulnerable. Having reviewed extracts from Lindsay's medical records I know that Lindsay has a history of mental health issues … This may have unfortunately made her an attractive target for threats, manipulation and coercion."

Sandiford was convicted on 19 December, with a recommendation from prosecutors that she be spared the death penalty – the maximum punishment for drug trafficking under Indonesian law – because of her age and cooperation with police, and instead receive a 15-year custodial sentence. On the same day, Rachel Dougall was found guilty of failing to report a crime, while Paul Beales was convicted of possessing hashish. They later received one year and four-year prison sentences respectively. Julian Ponder was cleared of drug smuggling, but convicted of the possession of narcotics in January 2013, and sentenced to six years' imprisonment.

== Sentencing ==
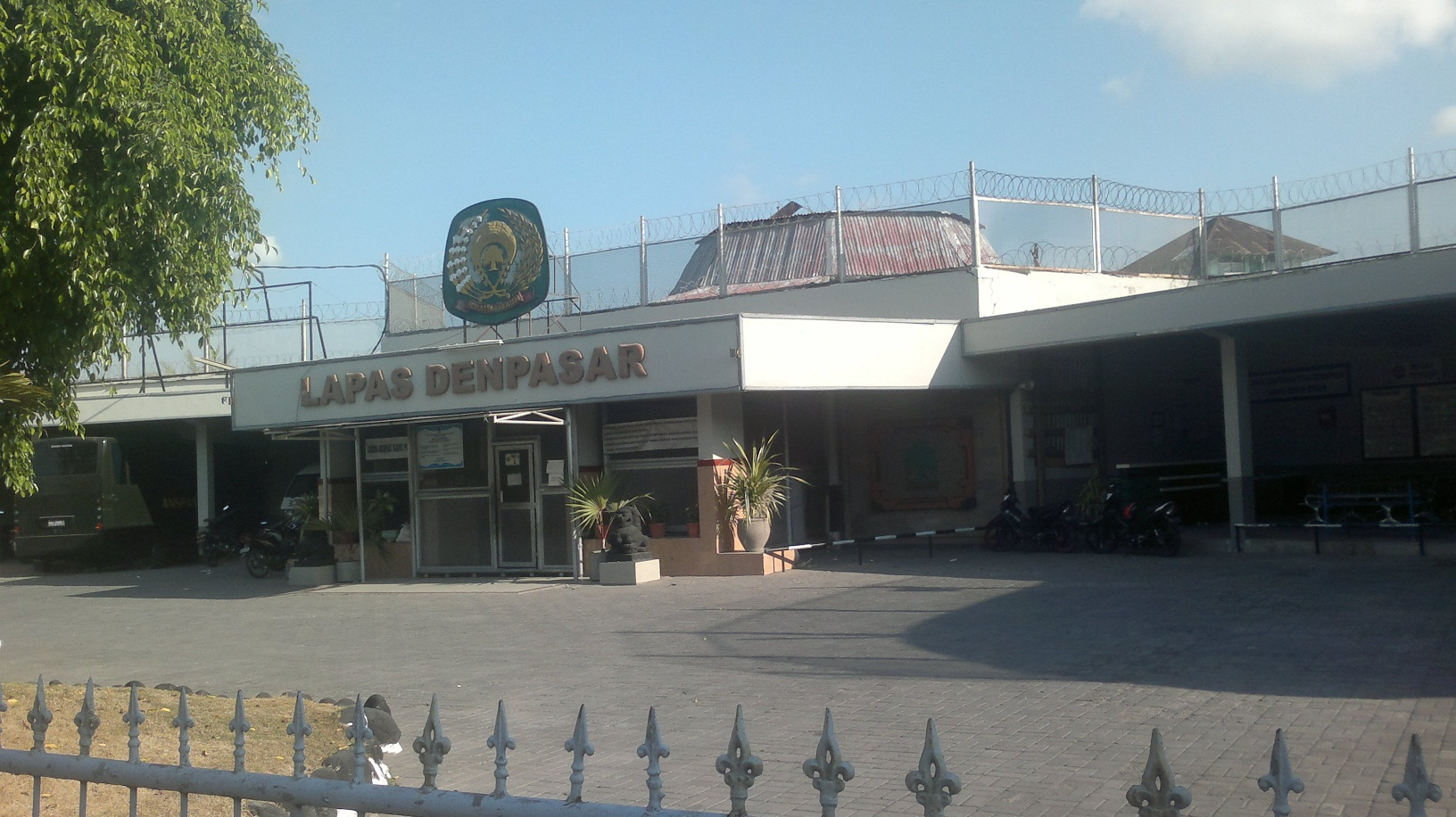
Sandiford was held at Kerobokan Prison following her sentence.

Despite the prosecution's recommendation of leniency, at her sentencing hearing on 22 January 2013 a panel of judges ruled there were no mitigating circumstances in Sandiford's favour and imposed a death sentence. Amser Simanjuntak, who headed the panel, said Sandiford's actions had damaged Bali's reputation as a tourist destination and undermined Indonesia's fight against drugs, while his colleague, Komang Wijaya Adi, said their decision had been influenced by several factors, including what was viewed as her lack of remorse. In Indonesia an execution is generally carried out by firing squad, often at night in an isolated location. Following the judgment Sandiford was led from the court in a distressed state, declining to speak to journalists before being escorted away by guards to be held at Bali's notorious Kerobokan Prison. Her lawyers announced she would appeal, a process that can take several years under Indonesian law.

In response to the sentence, the British embassy in Indonesia said the United Kingdom "remains strongly opposed to the death penalty in all circumstances" and that it was in touch with the UK government to discuss how best to provide Sandiford with legal representation. In a statement to the House of Commons, Hugo Swire, Minister of State for the Foreign Office, expressed his concern about the decision. "We are aware that Lindsay Sandiford is facing the death penalty in Indonesia. We strongly object to the death penalty and continue to provide consular assistance to Lindsay and her family during this difficult time." He also said that Foreign Secretary William Hague had raised the matter with his Indonesian counterpart.

Martin Horwood, MP for Cheltenham, Sandiford's most recent UK residence, expressed his shock at the sentence. "The days of the death penalty ought to be past. This is not the way that a country that now values democracy and human rights should really be behaving." The sentence was also condemned by the anti–death penalty charity Reprieve, which has taken up her case. The organisation's Harriet McCulloch said, "She is clearly not a drug king pin - she has no money to pay for a lawyer, for the travel costs of defence witnesses or even for essentials like food and water. She has cooperated fully with the Indonesian authorities but has been sentenced to death while the gang operating in the UK, Thailand and Indonesia remain free to target other vulnerable people."

At the time Sandiford was sentenced to death no executions had been carried out by Indonesia since 2008. On 4 February 2013 the country's attorney general, Basrief Arief, signalled his intention to resume executions by shortening the length of the appeals process, which he believed had delayed them. The country resumed executing condemned prisoners on 15 March, when a Malawian drug trafficker, Adami Wilson, was executed by firing squad in the early hours of the morning.

== Appeal ==
Sandiford had seven days to lodge an appeal following the sentence. On 28 January Gede Ketut Rantam, registrar of Denpasar District Court in Bali, confirmed his office had received an appeal request from Sandiford. She was then given a further fourteen days to file a more detailed appeal. The appellate system of Indonesia has three levels; the High Court, the Supreme Court, and a direct appeal for clemency to the President. (Note: As of April 2013 the incumbent President Susilo Bambang Yudhoyono had commuted four death sentences since taking office in 2004.)

Her financial resources had been exhausted by legal costs during her trial, and consular staff identified an Indonesian lawyer who was willing to represent her on a pro bono basis at appeal, but who required expenses of £2,500 to travel to Bali. On 1 February Teesside's Evening Gazette reported that £3,500 had been collectively pledged by donors to accounts established on online donation sites Justgiving and Indiegogo to pay for her legal fees. On 4 February the Gazette reported that the money had been used to hire a lawyer, while a Reprieve official was working in Bali to help file the appeal. Sandiford's lawyer, Fadillah Agus, lodged an appeal with the Indonesian High Court on 11 February. He argued that Sandiford's sentence did not take into account her cooperation with police.

In February 2013 the Foreign and Commonwealth Office submitted an amicus curiae (Note: The Latin phrase amicus curiae, which translates as "friend of the court", is a statement submitted to a court by a party who offers unsolicited information in a case.) to Denpasar District Court alleging that police had used sleep deprivation on Sandiford and threatened her with a firearm following her arrest, and consequently "violated Lindsay Sandiford's fundamental rights under international laws and the Indonesian constitution". The document also argued her punishment was disproportionate to the crime she committed, and did not take into account her cooperation with authorities. The British consulate in Bali also submitted a statement to the court expressing the country's objection to the death penalty.

Bali's High Court announced on 8 April 2013 that Sandiford's appeal had been denied and her conviction and death sentence upheld. The Court ruled the original sentence was "accurate and correct," and gave her 14 days to lodge an appeal with the Indonesian Supreme Court. Agus announced on 19 April that an appeal would be lodged within the next few days. On 23 April notice was given by Sandiford's lawyer to the Supreme Court that she would challenge the sentence.

On 7 May 2013, Sandiford appealed against her sentence to the Indonesian Supreme Court. On 30 August, the Supreme Court rejected her appeal. Sandiford was able to lodge a judicial review if new evidence was presented or if there was negligence in the case.

Sandiford applied for a presidential pardon in December 2014. In 2015 she recruited Indonesian lawyers for an attempt to seek a retrial on her behalf. No date had been set for her execution as of August 2017. In April 2023 she was still in Kerobokan Prison in Bali.

=== UK government legal challenge ===
On the day Sandiford lodged her preliminary appeal the London-based law firm Leigh Day, which is working with Reprieve on her behalf, said it would seek a judicial review of the UK government's position that it does not provide funds for the legal representation of British nationals facing criminal proceedings overseas. Reprieve believed that by not providing Sandiford, a British citizen, with financial help to cover her legal costs the government had breached its obligations towards her. The legal challenge was heard at the High Court before Mrs Justice Gloster and Mrs Justice Nicola Davies on 31 January, but the case was dismissed. The judges ruled that Sandiford had "no reasonable prospect of success", remarks that attracted criticism from anti–death penalty campaigners.

Sandiford appealed against this decision, but it was again rejected at the High Court in April 2013, by a three-judge panel chaired by Master of the Rolls Lord Dyson. By then Sandiford's first line of appeal against her death sentence had been rejected, and she required £6,000 towards her legal costs for the next stage of her appeal. (Note: The full cost of Sandiford's appeal to the Indonesian Supreme Court was £8,000. £2,000 of this had been raised at the time the case was heard on 22 April 2013. By 1 May £10,000 had been raised.) In his summing up on 22 April Lord Dyson said that it was "most unfortunate" Sandiford required "relatively speaking ... [a] very small sum indeed" for her legal costs, but that this "cannot affect the principle that we have had to consider and it cannot affect our decision. It may be that other means may be found to secure the relatively small sum in the course of the next few days." The judges published their reasons for rejecting the appeal on 22 May. In the written judgement, Lord Dyson said that Sandiford had argued the Foreign Secretary's position was "unlawful" but that the High Court had been "right to conclude" it was not. "As the Secretary of State concedes, it would be possible to produce a policy under which funds for legal representation were made available to British nationals in certain defined circumstances...But the question is not whether the Secretary of State could produce a different policy which many would regard as fairer and more reasonable and humane than the present policy. It is whether the policy that he has produced is irrational. I am in no doubt that the policy is not irrational. It is based on reasoning which is coherent and which is neither arbitrary nor perverse."

In a written interview with BBC Radio 5 Live presenter Victoria Derbyshire shortly after the UK appeal was rejected, Sandiford said that the Foreign Office's stance was "tantamount to condoning the death penalty" and claimed she was receiving little support from them. "The government and FCO are doing all they can to resist me at this difficult time."

== Release ==
On 21 October 2025, it was announced that the Indonesian and UK governments had reached an agreement, and that Sandiford would be released and allowed to return to the UK. She was repatriated to the UK on 7 November along with Shahab Shahabadi, who had been serving a life sentence for drug smuggling following his conviction in 2014. Both were reported to be experiencing health problems. Matthew Downing, the UK's Deputy Ambassador to Indonesia, said they would be given necessary treatment while being "governed by the law and procedures of the UK".
