= Tiah Delaney =

Australian model and writer (born 1985)

Tiah Eckhardt
- Born: Tiah Eckhardt; 5 June 1985 (age 41); Perth, Western Australia
- Occupations: Model, presenter, writer
- Modeling information
- Height: 5 ft 10 in (1.78 m)
- Hair color: Red
- Eye color: Blue
- Agency: Chic Model Management; Look Model Agency; Heffner Management; Storm Models

Tiah Eckhardt (born 5 June 1985) is an Australian model, presenter and writer from Perth, Western Australia.

== Career ==
Trained from age five in dance and theatre, Eckhardt was scouted by a model agent at age 14 and went on to appear in the Australian television series Search for a Supermodel at age 16.

She is represented by Heffner Management and Look Agency in the United States, Chic Model Management in Australia and Storm Models in Europe.

Eckhardt has appeared in publications such as Harper's Bazaar, Vogue, GQ, Oyster, Marie Claire, Cosmopolitan, Elle, Purple, Arena, AnOther Magazine, AnOther Man, Dazed & Confused, Wallpaper, Dansk, Wonderland, Stab, 10, Follow and Vanity Fair. Eckhardt has walked in multiple Australian Fashion Weeks and worked as a runway model in London, New York and Milan for designers such as Giorgio Armani, Jenny Packham, Heatherette and Bill Blass. She has appeared in international campaigns and lookbooks for the likes of Patricia Fields, John Richmond, Iceberg, MAC Cosmetics, Valentino, Cue, Wheels and Dollbaby, Sportsgirl, David Jones, Myer, Elegantly Scant, Volcom, Von Zipper, Rusty swimwear and Sunsilk haircare, as well as television commercials for Ford and Rosendorff Jewellers.

Eckhardt is perhaps best known for her lingerie work, appearing in campaigns for Agent Provocateur, alongside Daisy Lowe and Catherine Bailey, and replacing world ranked no.1 model Lara Stone as the face of luxury French lingerie brand Eres in 2010. She has been the ambassador for major Australian intimates brand Berlei since 2012 and lingerie chain Honey Birdette since 2015. Eckhardt has also performed a burlesque act professionally and is trained in dance and theatre, having attended John Curtin College of The Arts in Fremantle and the National Institute of Dramatic Art in Sydney for Screenacting. In January 2009, she posed for the French edition of Playboy as their Playmate of The Month. Her acting work includes a role in the "Allison" music video for Permanent Me alongside Boyd Holbrook.

== Other work ==
Eckhardt was a presenter for pop-culture website PedestrianTV, for whom she has also worked as writer. Additionally, she has written for publications such as Oyster, No Magazine, The Vine, Harper's Bazaar, Grazia, Nine MSN, PerthNow and The Sunday Times.

In 2012, she started the lingerie blog 'The Daily Knicker' where she reviews various intimate apparel brands.
