= Schapelle Corby =

Australian convicted drug smuggler (born 1977)

- Born: Schapelle Leigh Corby; 10 July 1977 (age 49); Tugun, Queensland, Australia
- Notable work: My Story/No More Tomorrows
- Spouse: Kimi Tanaka (pseudonym) (m. 1998; div. 2003)
- Status: Released 10 February 2014
- Conviction: Importation of marijuana (27 May 2005)
- Penalty: 20 years in prison Rp 100,000,000 fine

Schapelle Leigh Corby (born 10 July 1977) is an Australian woman who was convicted of smuggling cannabis into Indonesia. She spent nine years imprisoned on the Indonesian island of Bali in Kerobokan Prison. Since her arrest, Corby has publicly maintained that the drugs were planted in her bodyboard bag and that she did not know about them. Her trial and conviction were a major focus of attention for the Australian media.

Corby was convicted on 27 May 2005 for the importation of 4.2 kg (9.3 lb) of cannabis into Bali. She was sentenced to 20 years by the Denpasar District Court and imprisoned in Kerobokan Prison. On appeal, her conviction and sentence were confirmed with finality by the Indonesian Supreme Court. In March 2010, Corby petitioned the President of Indonesia, Susilo Bambang Yudhoyono, for clemency on the grounds of mental illness. In May 2012, she was granted a five-year sentence reduction. Corby was released on parole on 10 February 2014 after serving nine years in prison. According to her parole conditions, Corby was to leave Bali on 27 May 2017. She was deported on that date and returned to Australia.

== Early life ==
Corby was born in the Gold Coast suburb of Tugun, in the Australian state of Queensland, to Michael Corby (who died of bowel cancer on 18 January 2008) and Rosleigh Rose. She is the third of her mother's six children. Her mother's marriage to Corby's father which ended in 1979 when Corby was a baby, also produced a son and another daughter.

Upon completing year eleven, she enrolled in a part-time beauty therapy course at a technical and further education institute, finishing two of the four course modules. She then worked in her family's fish and chip shop and at a Coles supermarket.

In the mid-1990s, Corby met a Japanese man, given the pseudonym Kimi Tanaka by the media, who was on a working holiday in Australia and the two began dating. On Tanaka's return to Japan, Corby continued to visit him, and they married in June 1998 in Omaezaki, Shizuoka, Japan. While living in Omaezaki, she worked at a Japanese inn. Her husband also worked in the hospitality industry and as a seasonal worker on nearby tea farms. The couple separated and Corby returned to Australia in July 2000. The couple's divorce was finalised in 2003. Returning home to Australia, Corby had a stopover in Bali, where she had been five times since the age of sixteen, which included stopovers on her way to or from Japan.

Corby's older sister, Mercedes, was previously married to a Balinese man (who was Corby's parole guarantor) and lives in Bali.

== Arrest ==
On 8 October 2004, Corby, her brother and two friends flew from Brisbane to Bali transiting in Sydney. It was her first visit to Bali in four years, having had several previous stopovers between Australia and Japan to visit her sister, Mercedes.

Passing through customs upon her arrival at Ngurah Rai International Airport in Denpasar, Corby was stopped by customs officers and found to have 4.2 kg (9.3 lb) of cannabis in a double plastic vacuum-sealed bag in her unlocked bodyboard bag. Customs officer Gusti Nyoman Winata said that she tried to prevent him from opening the compartment of the bag containing the cannabis. Corby denied this during the trial, saying she originally opened the bag after being asked by Winata whose bag it was. Corby said she and the customs official had difficulty understanding each other. No CCTV footage of this interaction was retrieved or preserved.

Corby stated that she had no knowledge of the drugs until the bodyboard bag was opened by customs officers.

== Trial ==
The prosecution case was based on the customs official's testimony that Corby said the bag was hers, and that it was found to contain 4.2 kg of cannabis. Four customs officials present when her bag was first examined in Bali said she tried to stop the bag being opened, and that she had said "I have some..." This provided a prima facie case for the prosecution.

Three of Corby's travelling companions claimed in their testimony that they had seen her pack the bag before leaving for the airport and that only the flippers and yellow bodyboard were inside it. In contrast to the testimony of the customs officials, Corby said that she opened the bag herself at the customs counter.

The Australian Government offered the services of two Queen's Counsel on a pro-bono basis.

=== Alleged involvement of baggage handlers ===
Corby's lawyers argued that she had no knowledge of the cannabis until customs officials at the airport found it. Her defence centred on the theory that she had become an unwitting drug courier for what was supposed to have been an interstate shipment of drugs between Brisbane and Sydney in Australia. Her legal defence suggested that airport baggage handlers had put the drugs in Corby's bag, but they could not provide substantive probative evidence of this. According to her lawyers, the cannabis was meant to have been removed in Sydney. These claims were later supported when the former head of operations for the Australian Federal Police's internal investigation unit, Ray Cooper, claimed that it was well known within the AFP that some passengers were unwittingly being used to transfer drugs between domestic airports in Australia. In a June 2008 documentary, Schapelle Corby: The Hidden Truth, Corby's former lawyer, Robin Tampoe, said that he fabricated the defence theory that Australian baggage handlers could have planted the drugs in Corby's luggage and apologised to them, and said that former Australian foreign minister Alexander Downer told him he suspected Corby's brothers were behind the convicted drug smuggler's crime. Tampoe was subsequently struck off for misconduct.

According to The Sydney Morning Herald, Corby flew out of Sydney on the same day (8 October 2004) a large shipment of cocaine was shipped out of the airport by a drug ring involving corrupt baggage handlers. During the week of 9 May 2005, several arrests occurred in Australia related to cocaine smuggling through Sydney airport. Her defence claimed that the cannabis was planted in her bag by mistake by baggage handlers. However, the Australian Federal Police (AFP) commissioner, Mick Keelty, stated that a key aspect of her defence was not supported by the available intelligence and that the cocaine-smuggling ring which had been discovered involved the reception of shipments of drugs from overseas, not the transportation of drugs domestically.

John Patrick Ford, a prisoner at Port Phillip Prison who was awaiting trial and was subsequently convicted on unrelated charges, was flown to Indonesia to give evidence in Corby's defence.

Ford testified that he overheard a conversation in prison between two men and alleged that one of the men planted the marijuana in Corby's bodyboard bag in Brisbane with the intention of having another person remove it in Sydney. He stated that the drugs were owned by Ron Vigenser, who had been a prisoner at the same jail as Ford. He stated that a mix-up resulted in the marijuana not being removed and subsequently being transported to Indonesia, all without Corby's knowledge. He refused to name the man who he claimed planted the drugs. The prosecution pointed out that his evidence was entirely hearsay and that he was facing trial for several serious offences in Australia. In the Australian media, Vigenser strongly denied any connection with the drugs and reportedly gave a statement to the Australian Federal Police.

A $A1,000,000 reward was offered for information to substantiate claims made by Ford about baggage handlers with no result. Following his return from Bali, Ford was convicted of rape. Subsequently, in prison, he was beaten and stabbed and then held in solitary protective custody. Ford's wife stated that this was a consequence of evidence he gave at Corby's trial.

CCTV cameras at the Bali airport could not corroborate or contradict Corby's account of what happened in customs. The prosecutor said the tapes were not checked. The defence requested to see them. Corby's mother claims that Corby requested the CCTV footage be shown in court, to which the judge replied, "We will use that if we need to". Corby's mother claims the footage was never shown.

The four bags belonging to Corby and her companions were not weighed individually at Brisbane Airport, with a total weight of 65 kg being taken instead. The Bali police and customs did not record the weight of the bags, despite requests from Corby for them to do so. Corby requested that her other luggage be weighed in order to establish if there was an addition of approximately 4.2 kg from the weight checked in and recorded at Brisbane Airport. The weight increase would, according to her defence, have shown that the cannabis had been added after she had checked in her luggage. However, the request was denied.

On 30 June 2011, a woman came forward who had dated a Brisbane Airport baggage handler, a colleague of whom allegedly hid a large bag of marijuana in a traveller's bag in October 2004.

=== Forensic testing ===
Tim Lindsay of the University of Melbourne, an expert on Asian law, suggested that a greater focus on the forensic evidence might have helped Corby's case.

The bag of cannabis was neither fingerprinted by the Indonesian custom officials or police nor analysed to determine its origin. The cannabis was contained in two bags, and although the outer bag had been handled by customs officers, Corby's defence argued that only the bottom of the inner bag had been contaminated. Therefore, it was claimed that fingerprinting of the inner bag could be of value to the defence if it was shown not to possess Corby's fingerprints. In spite of requests to have the bag tested, including at the time of her arrest, such had not occurred by the time of Corby's second court appearance on 3 February 2005. At that court appearance the bag was handled by court officials. A formal request for fingerprinting made after the court appearance was unsuccessful. The prosecution argued that fingerprinting was unnecessary, as Corby was found with the drugs in her possession.

In 2004, Alexander Downer, the Australian Minister for Foreign Affairs, announced that the Australian Government would be requesting permission from Indonesia to test the cannabis and help determine its point of origin. It was argued that testing of the cannabis would have strengthened Corby's defence if it could have been shown that the drugs were grown in Indonesia, or potentially weakened it if they were grown in southern Queensland or elsewhere in Australia. However, shortly thereafter the Australian Consul General in Indonesia informed Corby that the AFP had no jurisdiction in the case, and in early 2005 the AFP was advised that the Bali police would not be providing a sample. Downer acknowledged that Indonesia had denied the request, but clarified that as the case was in Indonesia, it was their sovereign right to do so.

Three years later, in 2007, Vasu Rasiah, the "case co-ordinator" for Corby's defence team, appeared on Today Tonight to say that he managed to obtain a sample of the cannabis for testing prior to Corby's conviction, but that Corby did not allow the sample to be tested. This was similar to earlier claims by Mike Keelty, who in 2005 stated that Corby's legal team had advised the AFP that they did not wish to have the drugs tested when it became apparent that the results of the tests would be shared with Indonesia. In both cases these versions of events were disputed by Corby's family, who insisted that it was the Indonesian police who turned down the request, and that they wished to have the drugs examined by Australian authorities.

=== Pleas to be acquitted ===
Corby made pleas to be released. At the defence's last address to the court, on 29 April 2005, Corby said to the three judges:

I cannot admit to a crime I did not commit. And to the judges, my life at the moment is in your hands, but I would prefer if my life was in your hearts....And your Honour, I ask of you to show compassion, to find me innocent, to send me home. Saya tidak bersalah ("I am not guilty", in Indonesian).

Corby also wrote to the case's prosecutor, Ida Bagus Wiswantanu, and judges with a request for leniency.

=== Verdict and sentence ===
The verdict in the Corby trial was broadcast live on television in Australia and the Nine Network's television coverage was also broadcast live in New Zealand. The coverage included the 80-page trial outline, the verdict and sentencing.

On 27 May 2005, Corby was found guilty and sentenced to 20 years. She was also fined 100,000,000 IDR (about A$12,663), with an additional six months if unpaid. The defence and prosecution appealed separately to the High Court with the defence appealing for a retrial and the prosecution appealing for life imprisonment.

== Appeals and clemency ==
In July 2005, the High Court ruled that the case should be reopened by the district court, allowing the defence to call new witnesses. The onus was on the defence team to call sufficient witnesses to prove that Corby did not place the drugs in her bodyboard bag. One man was named as the owner of the drugs in Corby's bag. He was named as a key witness, but he said that he "knows nothing".

In October 2005, Bali's High Court reduced the sentence to 15 years. Both sides again appealed to Indonesia's Supreme Court. On 19 January 2006, the Indonesian Supreme Court overturned the five-year reduction in her sentence and reinstated the original 20-year jail term. The court ordered that the bodyboard bag and drugs be destroyed, signalling that the case was now closed. The three judge panel rejected a final appeal from Corby, whose lawyers had been seeking a lighter sentence or acquittal.

In August 2006, Corby and her legal team made an extraordinary appeal to the Denpasar District Court. The basis of the appeal was a letter submitted from an Australian government official that said CCTV cameras were operating at Sydney airport on the day she left and indicated that they hoped that the footage (although none has been shown to exist) would show drugs being put into Corby's bag. Corby's lawyers also said that the trial court did not have evidence of actual ownership of the drugs and thus erred in convicting her. The judges agreed to wait ten days to allow for footage to be presented before sending the record to the Supreme Court.

In March 2008, the Indonesian Supreme Court rejected Corby's final appeal against her sentence. Just prior to the decision of the Supreme Court, photographs of what were said to be Corby and her sister Mercedes were shown on A Current Affair, taken after tourists noticed two women having dinner at a bar at Kuta, a town near the Bali airport. Although at the time it was described as "common" for some prisoners to pay money to be let out of prison for a day, A Current Affair was unable to find a witness who could positively identify Corby in the photograph, and Corby's mother denied that the photograph showed her daughters. Shortly afterwards, Corby noted the physical differences between herself and the people in the photo, while telling the Chief of Prisons that she had not been at the restaurant and had only left the prison on prior occasions to visit a dentist.

In 2010, a clemency appeal for full remission on humanitarian grounds was made to the Indonesian President which cited her reported deteriorating mental health. In May 2012, the President granted a five-year cut to Corby's sentence.

== Remissions and parole ==
Corby received a total of 27.5 months remission on her original 20-year jail term. She received remissions totaling three months in 2006 as part of Indonesia's Independence Day and Christmas, but these were reversed in 2007 after Corby was found to be in possession of a mobile phone. On subsequent Independence Days, Corby was granted a remission of three months in 2008, four months in 2009, five months in 2010 and 2011, and six months in 2012. In addition, she was granted an additional 45 days off her sentence at Christmas in 2010.

=== Parole ===
Jail Governor, I Gusti Ngurah Wiratna, said Corby's remission had now been green-lit by Jakarta and the new date for expiry of her sentence would be 25 September 2016. Corby was granted parole on 7 February 2014 and released on 10 February 2014 after having served nine years in Kerobokan Prison. The ruling, however, meant that Corby had to live in Bali, follow other rules set by the correction bureau, and check in with the Bali corrections bureau monthly until her final release in May 2017.

=== Release from prison ===
Corby was released from Kerobokan Prison on 10 February 2014. Avoiding the packed media surrounding her, she was loaded into a prison van and taken to the prosecutor's office in Denpasar, where she was fingerprinted and had the rules of her parole explained to her. Corby then left the prosecutor's office in the prison van, which drove towards the Bali Correction Centre. After she arrived at the centre, she signed her parole and underwent final explanation of her parole. She was then released. It was believed she would stay with her sister in Kuta to serve her parole period.

As part of her parole conditions that Corby signed in August 2013, she agreed to:

- not use or distribute drugs
- report at least monthly to the Bali corrections board
- the board watching out for her welfare and behaviour, and agreeing to snap inspections of her sister's home.

Her parole conditions did not require her to admit any responsibility for the marijuana found in her possession in 2004. She was not required to live in her sister's house, but for the duration of her parole period, she was not allowed to leave Indonesia and required permission from the Justice Ministry to travel to other parts of Indonesia. Her parole period ended on 27 May 2017.

Her release attracted news coverage around the world, including in Japan, New Zealand, the United Kingdom and the United States.

=== Deportation and return to Australia ===
Corby was not expected to report to her Balinese parole officer again prior to her deportation to Australia on 27 May 2017. Bali's Ngurah Rai immigration office said standard procedure was for a prisoner about to be deported to be taken to an immigration office while awaiting their flight. Corby asked the head of Bali's correction division when she would be allowed to re-enter Indonesia for "sightseeing". Typically, foreigners deported from Indonesia are banned from entering the country for at least six months.

Corby flew out of Bali on 27 May 2017 with her sister Mercedes, arriving the following morning in Brisbane.

== Seized photographs ==
It was reported in December 2005 that a joint South Australian and Queensland police operation had seized photographs of Corby with a man charged with marijuana smuggling after a police search of the alleged dealer's home. It was reported in the media that the photos had been taken prior to Corby's arrest in Bali. After the reports, Corby's mother, Rosleigh Rose, flew to Adelaide, entered police headquarters and demanded (unsuccessfully) to see the photographs. She alleged that the photographs were taken with Corby in prison in Bali.

In January 2006, the man in the photographs, Malcolm McCauley, told Adelaide Now that he had visited Corby in Bali twice in 2005 although only as a tourist to offer support during her trial. McCauley said he first met Corby at her court hearing in May 2005. He said Corby's mother invited him to visit Corby at Kerobokan Prison the following day. Despite claims that the photos had been taken prior to Corby's arrest, McCauley said the photos were taken at an empty fish pond at the prison where the two had been permitted by prison guards to sit and talk.

In December 2005, Bali prosecutors expressed confidence that judges considering Corby's appeal would "increase her sentence in light of photographs seized by Australian police showing her with an alleged drug smuggler". In the next month, the Indonesian Supreme Court increased Corby's 15-year sentence to 20 years.

== Responses ==
Schapelle Corby support poster in Sydney

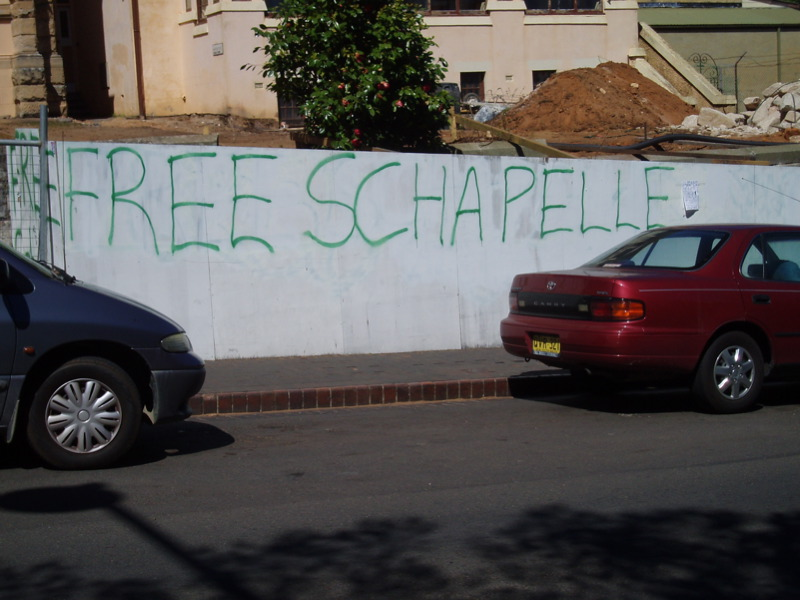
Schapelle Corby graffiti in Katoomba

Several days after the trial verdict, a letter was delivered to the Indonesian embassy in Canberra containing an unknown substance on 31 May 2005. It was later found to be non-toxic and was considered a hoax. The embassy was shut down for decontamination. With negotiations on a prisoner exchange agreement between Australia and Indonesia about to begin, the Australian Government condemned the actions saying if they were related to the Corby case they would not help. The Indonesian foreign ministry described the attack as a sorry and cowardly attempt at intimidating Indonesia, and said Indonesia would not succumb to such a threat.

During the trial, Corby wrote to the Australian Prime Minister, John Howard, saying "as a father and as a leader, I plead for your help. I did not do this. I beg for justice. I don't know how much longer I can do this. Please bring me home." Of Corby, Howard said: "I feel for her. I understand why there's a lot of public sympathy for her; I would simply say that I hope justice is done and it's a fair and true verdict ... I would ask the rhetorical question: My fellow Australians, if a foreigner were to come to Australia and a foreign government were to start telling us how we should handle [it], we would react very angrily to that." The Australian Labor Party generally supported the government's approach to the case in not wanting to interfere in Indonesia's judicial system, while Australian Greens leader Bob Brown criticised the verdict.

The Australian Government had talks with the Indonesian Government about a prisoner exchange program, which might have included Corby.

A number of Indonesian anti-drug campaign activists and politicians have criticised what they say is a light sentence and the subsequent five-year reduction in her sentence. Ahmad Yani, a member of the minority Islamic United Development Party said that "Corby deserves the death penalty" and "We lose 50 children to drugs every day." A 2014 editorial in Media Indonesia said that "Corby's freeing is highly offensive to society's sense of justice" and the Metro TV channel said "Is not that the same as rewarding an enemy who has killed our children?"

In 2014, Renae Lawrence, an Australian who had also been convicted of drug smuggling and had served part of her sentence in the same jail as Corby, said that Corby had confessed to her of having prior knowledge of the drugs being in the bag and that Corby said she had completed the same international drug run successfully without detection twice before.

== Media and public response ==
There was considerable media interest in and popular discussion of Corby's case.

Opinion polls at the time of Corby's arrest in 2004 found that most Australians believed her to be innocent. Subsequently, an ACNielsen poll published in June 2005, a week after the verdict, found that opinion was divided whether Corby was guilty but there was a perception that the trial had not been carried out fairly. A Morgan poll at the same time found that 51 per cent of Australians believed she was not guilty. However, an August 2010 Nielsen poll found that 1 in 10 respondents believed Corby to be innocent, 41 per cent thought she was guilty, and 48 per cent did not know. Forty per cent of Australians believed Corby should have had her 20-year prison sentence reduced.

For many months, every minor development in the case was reported on prime time TV. For example, a minor "collapse" in the court engendered erroneous speculation that she was pregnant by her former financial backer, Ron Bakir.

In Australia, over 100,000 people signed a petition that they believed Corby should be freed. In Indonesia, however, about 40 protesters gathered on 5 June 2005 at the Australian embassy in Jakarta calling for Corby to receive the death sentence and carrying placards with comments such as '"Corby, drug dealer, must die"'.

A documentary concerning Corby's arrest, trial and imprisonment, Ganja Queen, was produced by Janine Hosking and Steve Hosking in 2007. An extended version, Schapelle Corby: The Hidden Truth, was aired on Australian television by the Nine Network in June 2008.

After Corby's conviction, sales of luggage locks increased and some people began filming their luggage as a precautionary effort.

In early 2009, publicity agent Stephen Moriarty was appointed to represent the Corby family. A deal was agreed with New Idea magazine for a series of front cover stories to be published throughout the year. The deal was thought to be worth $100,000.

Her release from prison on parole was met by a scrum of journalists, photographers and reporters described as a media circus.

Corby has used her status in media to advocate for causes such as missing child William Tyrell, to the dismay of the child's family.

In January 2018, Corby released a pop song titled "Palm Trees" with singer-songwriter Nat Zeleny on Instagram. It came with a homemade video clip featuring photos of Corby in Queensland after she came back to Australia. Some social media followers were enthusiastic while others were critical. News Corp Australia commented "It's not clear if Corby will be seriously pursuing a career in music."

In 2020, it was announced Corby would be participating in the Seven Network's reality program SAS Australia.

In March 2021, it was confirmed that Corby had joined Dancing With The Stars. She was partnered with Shae Mountain. They were the third couple to be eliminated on 13 April 2021, following a dance-off with Matty J and his partner Ruby Gherbaz.

== Prison life ==
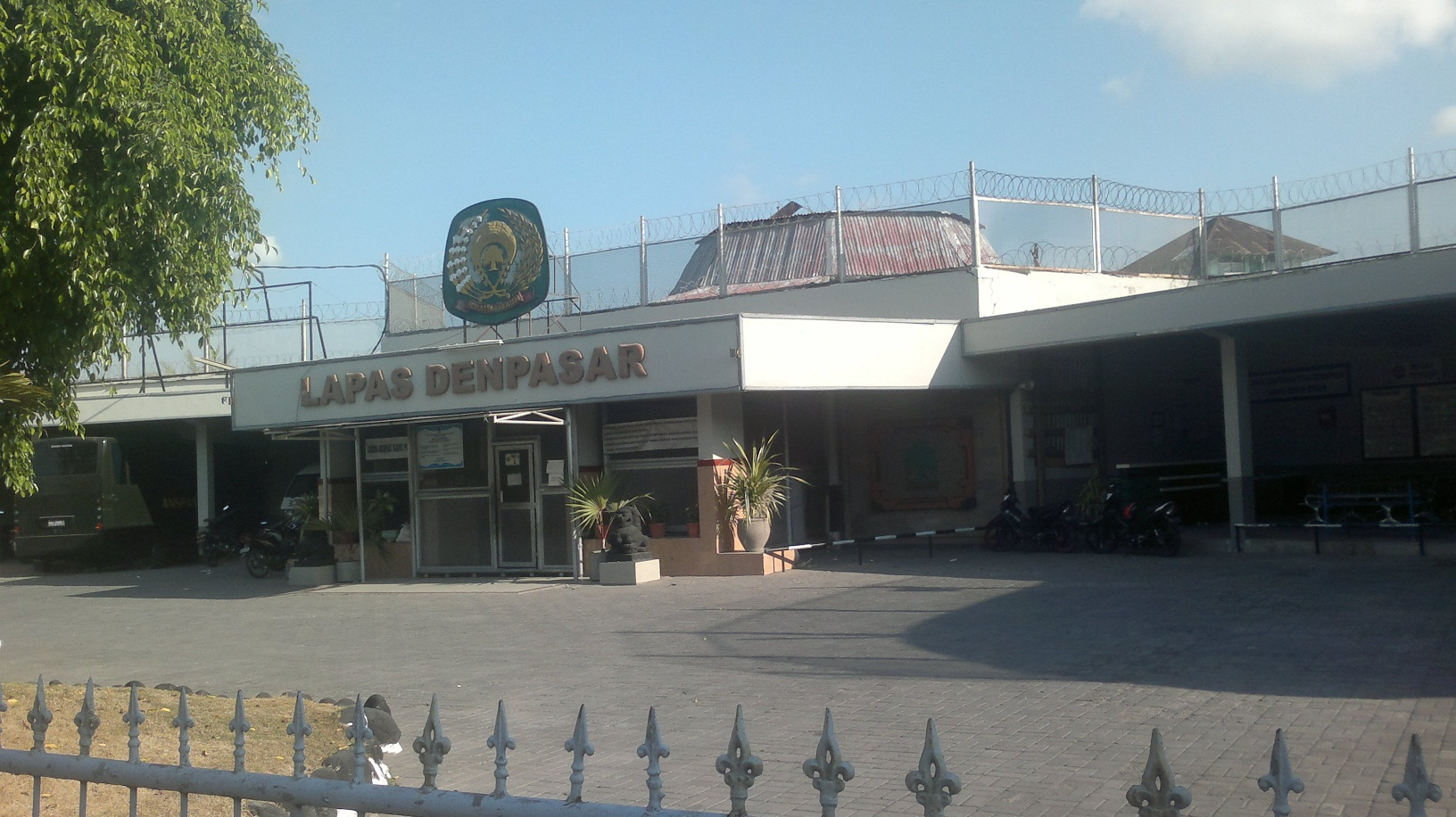
The prison where Corby was held

Corby's cell block was shared with 85 other women. She spent her time assisting others with personal grooming and making jewellery. During an interview by The Herald Sun on 12 May 2009, Corby said she had asked permission to run a beauty school inside the prison, and her proposal was apparently being considered by prison authorities, but it did not proceed. Visiting rules were tightened in 2007 after an apparent hoax when a bogus tour operator advertised that tourists could pay to have their photo taken with Corby.

=== Treatment for depression ===
Corby was taken from her prison to a Bali hospital in June 2008 to be treated for depression. In July 2008, she was permitted to leave her hospital ward under armed guard to visit a beauty salon within the hospital grounds to have her hair done and for a pedicure. While she was at the salon, word of her presence got out and, upon leaving the salon, Corby was faced with a large number of reporters. She attempted to hide her face as she left the salon and her doctor stated that her condition was "back to zero" and that additional treatment for depression would be needed. On 9 July 2008, she was returned to the prison, ending a stay of two and a half weeks in the hospital. Corby was again taken to the hospital on 22 May 2009 for depression.

In August 2009, Jonathan Phillips, an Australian psychiatrist and past president of the RANZCP, was paid by New Idea magazine to fly to Bali and assess her condition. His report, which appeared in the magazine and accompanied a deal between the magazine and the Corby family, stated that her mental condition was deteriorating seriously in the prison and urged that she be transferred to an Australian hospital or, at least, an Indonesian one. The Premier of Queensland, Anna Bligh, supported Corby serving her time in Australia. Corby has been medicated for both depression and bouts of psychosis.

In April 2014, Renae Lawrence claimed that Corby had confessed to her of having faked the symptoms of mental illness in order to attract leniency and the increased possibility of sentence reductions and parole while under sentence.

In her first live interview after release Corby said "I was out of my mind, literally for about four years". Speaking on The Kyle and Jackie O Show on 30 October 2019, she discussed her struggle with mental illness while in prison and how she became "catatonic" after her father died in 2008.

== Related persons ==
=== Michael Corby ===
During the 1970s, Corby's father, Michael Corby, was fined for possession of cannabis. He indicated that he was fined A$400 for possession of two grams of cannabis. However, he stated that the cannabis was not his, saying that "Some girl had it and they busted the whole joint and I had to go along for the ride."

A quantity of cannabis weighing 5 kg (11 lb) was seized from a property located beside property that Michael Corby owned but did not live at one month prior to his daughter's arrest. Corby's father and the neighbour had also lived in adjacent properties in Middlemount, Queensland, while both worked at the German Creek Mine during the 1990s. However, Queensland police later discredited suggestions Michael Corby was involved in the drug trade, saying that "Queensland Police has no evidence to link Michael Corby with involvement in the drug trade."

A book, Sins of the Father, by Sydney Morning Herald investigative journalist Eamonn Duff, said that the drugs found in Corby's bag belonged to Michael Corby. According to the book, Corby's father regularly bought marijuana from a South Australian drug syndicate headed by convicted drug trafficker Malcolm McCauley. The book says that this is the reason McCauley visited Corby in jail two weeks before her verdict. The book also describes how a fortnight before Corby's arrest, Queensland police received a signed informant's statement naming her father as a man who was delivering drugs on commercial flights to Bali.

=== James Kisina's arrest ===
Kisina was travelling with Corby when she was arrested in Bali. He had also been carrying the bodyboard bag before the arrest and had appeared in the media to support his sister.

On the same day as the reinstatement of Corby's original sentence, Kisina appeared in a Brisbane magistrates court on drug possession and assault charges. Kisina, along with two friends, invaded the home of a well-known drug dealer, tied up the occupants and assaulted a male occupant before fleeing with a quantity of cannabis and cash. Police stated that the residents were threatened with an iron bar and menaced with a machete.

On 17 January 2006, Queensland Police found cannabis in the home of Corby's mother and half-brother. Police stated that the house which Kisina had broken into had been watched by police for some time and that the occupant of the home was a known drug dealer. Kisina's lawyer denied this contention and claimed his client broke into the home believing its occupants may have had information that could assist in Corby's sentence appeal. On 8 March 2006, Kisina appeared in the Beenleigh Magistrates Court in relation to the drug-related home invasion and was committed to stand trial after a committal hearing in June.

In Beenleigh District Court, on 13 October 2006, Kisina pleaded guilty to eight charges: two counts of deprivation of liberty, two counts of assault occasioning bodily harm and one count each of producing a dangerous drug, possessing a dangerous drug, possessing an item used in a criminal offence and entering a dwelling. He was sentenced on 16 October 2006 to four years' imprisonment, to be suspended after 10 months. Kisina had spent 9 months on remand. He was released from prison on 18 November 2006.

A senior Queensland Police detective raised a link between Kisina and Corby's arrest in Bali, but later admitted his claims did not meet the "standard of proof" required to take action against Kisina.

=== Ron Bakir ===
Ron Bakir, a Gold Coast entrepreneur, said he had retained the services of the Australian law firm Hoolihans to investigate the origin of the drugs. He made statements suggesting that he would fund Corby's defence, wanting to raise awareness and seek the support of the Australian Government. Bakir later registered a company titled Schapelle Corby Pty Ltd. The total sum that Bakir donated to the defence is unknown, although he claims to have donated more than $200,000 to her campaign.

Bakir accused the prosecution team (chief prosecutor Ida Bagus Wiswantanu) of seeking a bribe to reduce the requested sentence. The prosecution team and the Indonesian government vehemently denied that this occurred. Corby's legal team were openly angry with Bakir since this could cause the imposition of a more severe penalty.

Bakir cut ties with the Corby case on 24 June 2005. Schapelle Corby Pty Ltd and the domain name "SchapelleCorby.com.au" were voluntarily deregistered on 23 October 2005.

=== Jodi Power's allegations ===
On 12 February 2007, Jodi Power, a longtime Corby family friend, appeared on current affairs television program Today Tonight during a paid interview that had been filmed in December 2006. Power, with her two children, had lived for months in Bali during the trial to support Corby, made allegations that Corby's sister Mercedes had previously asked Power to transport drugs to Bali. Power also alleged that Mercedes had confessed to smuggling compressed cannabis concealed inside her body into Indonesia.

Power claimed that she had seen a vacuum sealed plastic bag similar to the one Corby was convicted of using to transport the cannabis to Indonesia at Mercedes Corby's house. She said, "They were getting marijuana out of it. It looked like the same bag." In a further interview, when asked if Corby had taken drugs, Power replied, "Yes ... I know she's had ecstasy, speed, cocaine."

Power took three polygraph tests on the program, failing the first but passing the next two. She maintained that she had told the truth about Corby but had failed the first polygraph test because she had lied in response to personal questions relating to herself.

Power alleged that the Corby family had lied when stating they had no connections to cannabis. Photographs shown on the program reveal Mercedes smoking what appears to be cannabis. Mercedes Corby has admitted to having "the occasional puff (of marijuana) as a teenager" and indicated that it was her in the photographs shown on Today Tonight, but that they were taken when she was aged 17. Power herself has admitted to marijuana use—at the Corby house.

In response to the statements made by Power, Mercedes Corby was quoted as saying, "Schapelle is in her final appeal and for Jodi to come out and lie is low", saying that the claims could damage Corby's appeal.

Mercedes Corby was interviewed in response to Power's claims on 14 February 2007 on A Current Affair. Power's mother, Margaret Power, was interviewed on 13 February 2007 edition of Today Tonight. She said that her daughter was telling the truth and then suggested that Mercedes Corby also take a polygraph test, expressing her belief that she would fail it.

Today Tonight reported that the polygraph expert who conducted the lie detector test on Jodi Power has received numerous death threats. On 30 March 2007, Mercedes Corby filed suit for defamation against Today Tonight and its producers and staff. The matter was scheduled for initial hearing on 15 May 2007.

On 29 May 2008, the Seven Network was found to have defamed Mercedes Corby for implying that she was a drug smuggler and a drug dealer and also that she posed a threat to the safety of Jodi Power. Mercedes Corby's barrister described her to the jury as "an ordinary Australian" subjected to a "trial by media" solely because her sister was "locked up in a stinking jail in Bali". The jury upheld the network's defence of truth for stating that Mercedes Corby possessed marijuana.

The case was subsequently settled on undisclosed terms. Corby's mother Rosleigh Rose also received a settlement from the Seven Network as a consequence of the same program.

== Autobiography ==
In November 2006, Corby released an autobiography titled My Story. The book has sold more than 100,000 copies. Copyrights for the book were assigned by Corby to her sister, Mercedes, and co-author Kathryn Bonella in a move some believe will allow Corby to access proceeds from the sale of the book and avoid Australian laws which restrict convicted criminals from profiting from the proceeds of crime. However, in March 2007, the Queensland Court of Appeal barred the Corby family from spending money generated by the book, pending a claim by the Commonwealth under laws which prevent those who commit crimes from profiting by them. The amount of $267,500 has been frozen pending forfeiture proceedings.

Qantas refused the use of light box displays to advertise the book at its Australian terminals, saying it was their right to refuse advertising they deem inappropriate on their premises.

In July 2007, a Queensland court granted the government the right to interview four individuals in the publishing industry, who were not named, in order to secure evidence. It was also revealed that the proceeds from the book, as well as from a subsequent paid interview, were deposited in the name of Mercedes Corby's Indonesian husband.

In 2008, Corby's autobiography was retitled and published as No More Tomorrows for the international market and was published in English, Spanish, Portuguese, Polish and Dutch. The original autobiography was extended, updated and republished in October 2019.

== See also ==
- Bali Nine
- Illegal drug trade
- Legality of cannabis
- Michelle Leslie
- Schapelle (film)
- List of Australian criminals
- List of Australians imprisoned or executed abroad
