= Ganja Queen =

- Film poster
- Produced by: Janine Hosking; Steve Hosking
- Starring: Schapelle Corby (protagonist)
- Release date: 2007
- Country: Australia
- Language: English

Ganja Queen is an Australian documentary film about the arrest, trial, and imprisonment of Schapelle Corby released in 2007. An expanded version titled Schapelle Corby: The Hidden Truth, was aired by the Nine Network in Australia in June 2008. Ganja Queen was later aired on HBO in North and South America, before being released on DVD.

The film was produced by Janine Hosking and Steve Hosking. Schapelle Corby: The Hidden Truth was later nominated for Most Outstanding Documentary or Documentary Series at the Logie Awards of 2009.
