= Ida Bagus Wiswantanu =

Ida Bagus Wiswantanu has been Chief Government Prosecutor in Bali, Indonesia since 2002. From 2005 until 2007 he was reassigned as general prosecutor to Yogyakarta, since 2008 he is Bali's Chief Government Prosecutor again. In November 2008 Wiswantanu was in charge of the execution of 3 convicted terrorists who were convicted for their involvement with the bombings of 2002 in Kuta, Bali.

Wiswantanu had stated that in 90 per cent of more than 200 narcotics cases he has handled, he has obtained the sentence he has sought for the accused. He also claimed that the one in ten cases in which judges have wound back his sentence requests are the small ones, "usually less than 100 grams".
