= Kerobokan Prison =

Prison on Bali, Indonesia

Kerobokan Penitentiary Institution
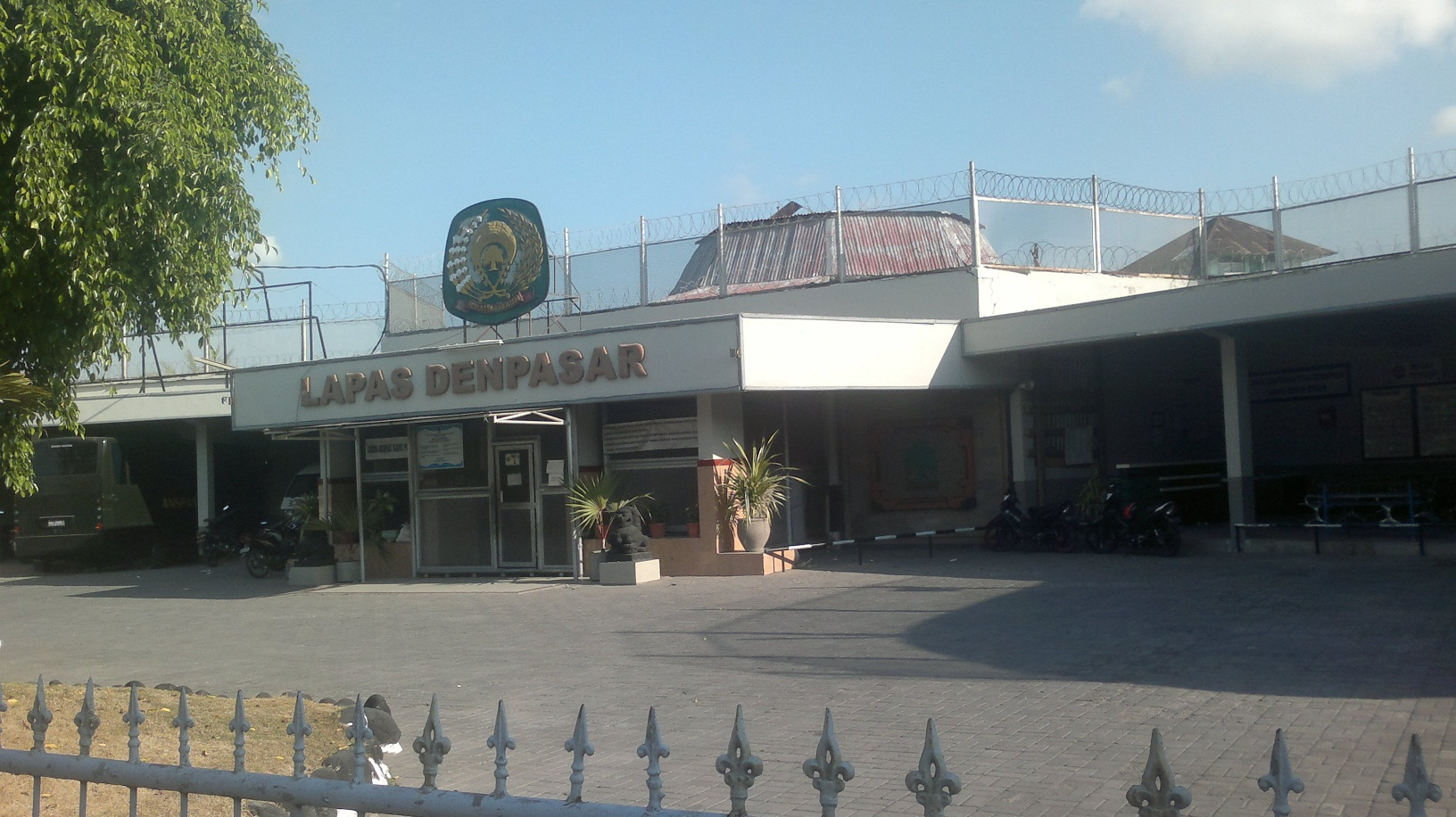
- The entrance to the prison

- Location in Badung Regency
- Location: Badung Regency, Bali, Indonesia; 8°40′22″S 115°10′5″E
- Security class: Class IIA
- Capacity: 320
- Population: 1,400 (2017)
- Opened: 1979
- Governor: Tony Nainggolan
- Warden: Tony Nainggolan

Kerobokan Penitentiary Institution (Indonesian: Lembaga Pemasyarakatan Kerobokan; Balinese: ᬍᬫ᭄ᬩᬕᬧᭂᬫᬲ᭄ᬬᬭᬓᬢᬦ᭄ᬓᭂᬭᭀᬩᭀᬓᬦ᭄; also known as LP Kerobokan, Kerobokan Prison or Hotel K) is a prison located in Kerobokan, Badung Regency, on the Indonesian island of Bali. Located 4 km (2.49 miles) away from the Canggu village, the prison opened in 1979 and was built to hold 300 inmates. As of 2017, the Kerobokan Prison contains over 1,400 male and female prisoners of various nationalities. More than 90% of the prisoners are Indonesian and 78% were convicted on drug charges. 15,000 rupiah ($1.08) per day is allocated for each prisoner.

== Notable prisoners ==
- Schapelle Corby: 20 years (served 9); she was granted parole on 8 February 2014 and was released on 10 February 2014.
- Michael Blanc: Life sentence (served 14 years); transferred to Madiun, East Java and finally jailed in Cipinang, Jakarta. Granted parole and released in January 2014.
- Bali Bombers: Amrozi bin Nurhasyim and Imam Samudra; executed by firing squad for their key roles in the 2002 nightclub bombings in Kuta, Bali
- Bali Nine: Australians, including Andrew Chan and Myuran Sukumaran, apprehended at Denpasar Airport with heroin strapped to their bodies, one arrested at Denpasar Airport for allegedly being responsible for collecting the drugs on arrival at the destination and four arrested for related offences at their accommodation in Kuta.
- Lindsay Sandiford: British woman sentenced to death for drug trafficking

== Riots and history of violence ==
Kerobakan Prison has a long and complicated history of riots and other violence involving prisoners and guards. In December 2015, two inmates were killed because of a riot between rival gangs. As a result of this, police transferred more than one hundred inmates to other local prisons.

== Escapes ==
- On 19 June 2017, four prisoners—Shaun Davidson (Australia), Dimitar Nikolov Iliev (Bulgaria), Saye Mohammed Said (India), and Tee Kok King (Malaysia) escaped via a hole dug under a wall. The tunnel was 50 cm by 75 cm wide and 15 metres long.
- On 10 December 2017, two prisoners (Chrishan Beasley, 32 and Paul Anthony Hoffman, 57) from the United States escaped, allegedly using a ladder to climb the prison wall. These reports, however, are unconfirmed, as others state the two "had cut a hole in the roof with a hacksaw first." Hoffman was caught "immediately" according to authorities, while Beasley was able to get away. A manhunt was started following his escape. Beasley had been arrested in August 2017 on suspicion of possessing more than 5 grams of hashish.
