= Bali Nine =

Drug smugglers convicted in Indonesia in 2005

Andrew Chan; Si Yi Chen; Michael Czugaj; Renae Lawrence; Tan Duc Thanh Nguyen; Matthew Norman; Scott Rush; Martin Stephens; Myuran Sukumaran
- Status: Chen, Czugaj, Norman, Rush and Stephens: Repatriated to Australia in December 2024; Chan, Sukumaran: Executed by firing squad (29 April 2015); Nguyen: Died due to stomach cancer (5 June 2018); Lawrence: Paroled, released 22 November 2018
- Conviction: Drug trafficking (2006)
- Penalty: Lawrence: 20 years' imprisonment, only served 14; Chen, Czugaj, Nguyen, Norman, Rush and Stephens: Life imprisonment, only served 19 years; Chan, Sukumaran: Death

Details
- Imprisoned at: Lawrence: Bangli, Bali, Indonesia; Rush: Karangasem, Bali; Chen, Czugaj, Norman: Kerobokan Prison, Bali; Nguyen and Stephens: Malang, East Java, Indonesia

The Bali Nine were a group of nine Australians convicted for attempting to smuggle 8.3 kg (18 lb) of heroin out of Indonesia in April 2005. The heroin was valued at around A$4 million and was bound for Australia. Ringleaders Andrew Chan and Myuran Sukumaran were sentenced to death and executed on 29 April 2015. Six other members, Si Yi Chen, Michael Czugaj, Tan Duc Thanh Nguyen, Matthew Norman, Scott Rush and Martin Stephens, were sentenced to life imprisonment whilst another, Renae Lawrence, received a 20 year sentence. She was released after the sentence was commuted in November 2018. The Indonesian authorities reported on 5 June 2018 that Tan Duc Thanh Nguyen had died of stomach cancer. In November 2024, Prime Minister Anthony Albanese sought the repatriation to Australia of the remaining five members of the Bali Nine. On 15 December 2024, the five remaining members of the group were repatriated to Australia, and their life sentences were commuted with immediate effect.

== Background and arrests ==
Several of the Bali Nine were employed by Eurest, a multinational catering company. Norman, Lawrence, Stephens and Chan, the latter a supervisor with the company, all worked for Eurest, which provided hospitality services to the Sydney Cricket Ground, where the group was employed. Rush and Czugaj alleged they were recruited by Tan Duc Thanh Nguyen, their co-defendant and the alleged financier of the smuggling plan, while socialising at a karaoke bar in Brisbane.

Evidence was heard that Rush had met Nguyen six months earlier while fishing. He then travelled to Sydney with Nguyen to attend a 21st birthday party where he was introduced to Sukumaran, who called himself "Mark". It was alleged Nguyen offered them free trips to Bali. Several days later Rush and friend Czugaj returned to Sydney, where arrangements were made for them to travel to Indonesia. The Australian Federal Police (AFP) concluded that Sukumaran, Chan, Lawrence and Norman were part of a larger syndicate that successfully imported a commercial quantity of heroin into Australia from Indonesia on 23 October 2004. Other members of the syndicate were arrested in 14 AFP raids in Sydney and Brisbane on the same day in early May 2005.

=== Arrests in Indonesia ===
Lawrence and Stephens arrived in Indonesia on 6 April 2005, followed by Rush and Czugaj, old school friends from Brisbane, who arrived two days later. The group was introduced at a hotel where Chan and Sukumaran were staying, having arrived in Bali earlier.

Chan and Sukumaran handed out SIM cards to stay in contact. During their stay, police noted the group would spend a large amount of time in their hotel rooms, although Rush and Czugaj went shopping, eating, drinking and played water sports. The group met again on 16 April for what police allege was a final briefing, before meeting for their final time at the airport before their 17 April arrest. After receiving information from the AFP about the group, including the names, passport numbers and information relating to their links to possible illegal drug trade, Indonesian police placed the group under constant surveillance for a week before their arrest.

The group was arrested at Ngurah Rai Airport on 17 April. Between them, they were in possession of more than 8.3 kilograms (18 lb) of heroin in plastic bags. Chan had several mobile phones in his possession, but was carrying no drugs when arrested. Indonesian police believe a 22-year-old Thai woman, Cherry Likit Bannakorn, supplied Chan with the heroin. She was believed to have left Bali on 18 April 2005, a day after the nine Australians were arrested, and was briefly detained at the Thai-Malaysian border, but released as the paperwork needed for her to be extradited to Indonesia was not available.

Head of the surveillance team I Nyoman Gatra later testified in court during trials for the accused that police were initially unaware Sukumaran was part of the group, because original information obtained from the AFP did not mention him by name. Indonesian police assumed Sukumaran was Chan's bodyguard as he was seen to accompany Chan in Bali.

== Criminal proceedings ==
=== Pre-trial investigation ===
Indonesian law does not require that arrested people be immediately charged with an offence, and by 22 April 2005 no charges had yet been laid. Police indicated that the five arrested at the airport would be charged with drug trafficking, which carries the death penalty, while those arrested in the hotel would be charged with the lesser offence of drug possession, which carries a maximum penalty of ten years' imprisonment. It was suggested that Andrew Chan recruited the other eight to act as drug mules – couriers who would not arouse suspicion while carrying heroin to Australia – and offered them A$10,000 to A$15,000 each to carry out this task, and given A$5000 spending cash.

On 27 April 2005, Colonel Bambang Sugiarto, head of the Bali police drug squad, said police would seek to have all nine charged with offenses which carry the death penalty. He revealed that several of the nine had previously visited Bali using false passports, suggesting that they had acted as drug couriers before. Indonesian police released video evidence showing heroin being removed from the bodies of the four arrested at the airport. Indonesian police initially maintained that Chan was the "mastermind" of the importation plan.

Australian police said that they believed that an Australian drug syndicate was behind the plan. It was soon decided that Myuran Sukumaran, not Chan, was the real leader of the smuggling plot. Defence lawyers conceded that the four arrested at the airport were acting as drug couriers, but said they did it for the money to help their low-income families and because they were threatened with physical harm if they did not comply. They also said they did not know what they were transporting and did not know that drug trafficking in Indonesia carried the death penalty.

=== Reactions in Australia ===
The parents of Rush and Lawrence criticised the AFP for allowing the Indonesian police to arrest the nine rather than allowing them to fly to Australia and arresting them in Sydney upon their return. On 24 April 2005, AFP Commissioner Mick Keelty said the AFP would hand over all evidence it had obtained against the Bali Nine:

The policy is that we will not give evidence that will, or information that will, directly cause or result in somebody receiving the death penalty, but the reality is in this case, it would appear, on the allegation, that these people have been caught red-handed with heroin in Indonesia."

— Australian Federal Police Commissioner Mick Keelty, May 2005.

Lawrence's father, Bob Lawrence, said in October 2005 that he wanted to meet Keelty face to face after learning of the comments made by Lee Rush:

As far as I'm concerned, and excuse the expression, [Keelty] is an arsehole. These kids were forced into this ... they should have been either arrested at the airport here or followed to get the big guys. I don't know how they can sleep at night ... even if [the Bali Nine] were guilty of doing it willingly, it still doesn't deserve the death penalty.

— Bob Lawrence, father of Renae Lawrence, October 2005.

On 13 February 2006, Rush's parents gave an interview to the ABC TV program Australian Story, speaking out against AFP actions. Rush's parents were quoted as saying:

I was informed at 1:30 in the morning that Scott would be spoken to and asked not to board the flight to Bali. It wasn't until about mid-morning that I received a call from Bob (Rush's lawyer) and a distressed tone in his voice he said "Mate, we could not stop him, they have let him go through and he's on his way to Bali." Under no circumstances do I condone the trafficking of drugs – I particularly dislike drugs of any nature, always have. When I received a call from the Australian Government authorities that Scott had been detained in Indonesia for attempting to export heroin, I was speechless, sickened to the gut.

— Lee Rush, father of Scott Rush interviewed on ABC TV's Australian Story, February 2006.

I feel very let down by our Australian Federal Police – we tried to lawfully stop our son leaving the country, it wasn't done..... The Federal Police can do, go wherever they want, do anything, anytime without supervision from the Australian Attorney-General or from the Justice Minister. ... This is not good for Australians and our laws need to be changed to protect our citizens and this must not happen to any Australian citizen again.

— Christine Rush, mother of Scott Rush, February 2006.

In an interview aired on the same episode of Australian Story, Mike Phelan of the AFP responded to the Rush family's criticisms and said:

Even with the aid of hindsight, should the same set of circumstances present themselves again with another syndicate or other people, we would do exactly the same thing ... there have also been a large number of young lives on the other side of the ledger that have been saved as a result of the AFP's operations over many years.

— AFP's Mike Phelan interviewed on ABC TV's Australian Story, February 2006.

Keelty went on to state that "if someone went back to Lee Rush and assured him that Scott would not be able to travel then that is their call."

We would never have given any assurance, because there was no lawful reason to prevent him from travelling. My sympathy is with Lee Rush because somebody has misled him. Whoever gave Lee Rush the assurance that his son would be prevented from travelling acted dishonourably. There is no way anyone in the AFP would have provided that assurance because there was simply no power to detain him. He was not wanted on warrants, there were no conditions of his bail that prevented him from travelling overseas.

— AFP Commissioner Keelty on ABC TV's Lateline, February 2006.

Federal justice minister Chris Ellison, defended the AFP's actions:

What we have are serious allegations as to criminal activity which allegedly occurred on Indonesian soil and the Indonesian police acted accordingly. We would expect the same of Australian police if the situation was reversed.

— Federal Justice Minister, Senator Chris Ellison, April 2005.

The Foreign Minister, Alexander Downer, said that Australia opposed the death penalty and would seek clemency for the group if they were convicted.

Philip Ruddock, a federal MP, was quoted as saying:

We will not provide co-operation in relation to criminal matters unless there is an assurance that a death penalty will not be sought. If there was further information that had to be obtained from here through the Australian Federal Police, we would seek an assurance that Indonesia would not be wanting a death penalty in each of those cases.

— Philip Ruddock, MP, September 2005.

=== Criminal trials ===
Criminal trials for the accused commenced in the Denpasar District Court on 11 October 2005. Three of the four arrested at the Melasti Bungalows, Nguyen, Chen and Norman, were tried together, with the remaining six defendants tried separately. All defendants faced a maximum penalty of death by firing squad if found guilty. The trials were often delayed due to the defendants complaining of illness, headaches and nausea. Australia's prime minister, John Howard, said the Australian government would oppose any death sentences imposed.

On 6 December 2005, Australian lawyers Robert Richter QC and Brian Walters QC called for the Commonwealth Director of Public Prosecutions to extradite the nine to Australia on heroin conspiracy-related charges. On 7 December 2005, Denpasar District Court judge I Wayan Yasa Abadhi called for Australians not to interfere in the legal proceedings in Indonesia, saying:

Criticism from outside is expected, but Indonesian courts will only adhere to the laws applied in this country, and that includes the death penalty. The judges will not budge, we will not be affected by public opinion or the media.

— Denpasar District Court Judge I Wayan Yasa Abadhi, December 2005.

The case became one of the most prominent examples of Indonesia's enforcement of its narcotics laws against foreign nationals, attracting international attention and diplomatic debate. Sukumaran remained mostly silent throughout the proceedings and blamed amnesia for his poor recollections of events leading to his arrest. Trials were scheduled to be completed with verdicts announced before 23 February 2006, before a legal deadline for the group's detention expired.

Lawrence claimed that she received threats of harm against herself and her family if she did not proceed with the plan to import heroin into Australia and gave evidence in the Denpasar District Court that she was ordered to book a flight to Bali. She claimed she did not know why she was ordered to travel. Her co-accused Stephens claimed he was also ordered, with threats, to travel to Bali by Chan, who showed him some photographs of his family going about their daily lives, saying that they would be killed if he did not co-operate.

Rush further accused Chan of strapping the heroin to his body wearing rubber gloves. Chan protested his innocence and defending his silence during his final plea, reading from a two-page statement:

I didn't say anything in court because if I did, I'd be lying. The truth is, I know nothing. A lot of lies have been said against me, but the true reality is I'm not what people put me out to be. I've never threatened anybody in my life. The outcome I wish, of course, and my family is that you find that you would release me, for I had nothing to participate in this.

— Andrew Chan, reading from his statement before the Denpasar District Court prior to his sentencing, February 2006.

In sentencing Lawrence, the judges found no evidence to support her claim that her life was threatened and although the prosecutors requested a lighter 20 year sentence due to her early cooperation with police, the judges sentenced her to life imprisonment. On the next day, the remaining three defendants, Chen, Nguyen and Norman, were sentenced to life imprisonment as well. On 24 January 2006, the prosecutors demanded the death penalty for Sukumaran, this being the first time that a demand of death was put forward for any of the Bali Nine. They told the Bali court that there was no reason to show any leniency to the 24-year-old, because he helped organize the heroin smuggling operation. The prosecutors also claim that it was Sukumaran who strapped heroin to the bodies of his fellow accused. Indonesian police identified Sukumaran as one of the main players in what they said to be a major smuggling ring. On 26 January, it was also recommended that Andrew Chan receive the death penalty.

On 14 February 2006, after learning of his fate, Sukumaran attacked photographers and threw water bottles at protesters and onlookers gathered outside the court building.

After news that the death penalty had been handed down, then–Australian Prime Minister John Howard, noting that the death penalty warnings had been in place in Indonesia for decades, implored the youth of Australia to take notice and not take such "terrible risks".

The death sentences were criticised by some Australians, who compared them to the light sentence given to Abu Bakar Bashir, the Indonesian leader of the terrorist group which carried out the 2002 Bali bombings that killed more than 200 people including 88 Australians. Both death sentences were cheered by some of those in court.

Allegations of bribery were made on 27 April 2015 relating to Indonesian judicial authorities, to reduce sentences to less than 20 years in prison. A former lawyer for Chan and Sukumaran declared that the original amount demanded was more than 1 billion rupiah (A$133,000), but two weeks before they were due to be sentenced, the "deal" failed and backfired, triggering a request for the death penalty. Julie Bishop, Australia's Minister for Foreign Affairs, expressed her concern over the allegations involving the questioning of the integrity of the judicial process.

=== Timeline of sentences and appeals ===
On 13 February 2006, Lawrence and Rush, the first of the nine to face sentencing, were sentenced to life imprisonment. The next day, Czugaj and Stephens were sentenced to life imprisonment, and the group ringleaders, Chan and Sukumaran, were sentenced to death by firing squad, the first ever death sentences imposed by the Denpasar District Court. The other three, Norman, Chen and Nguyen, were all sentenced to life imprisonment on 15 February 2006. On 26 April 2006, Lawrence, Nguyen, Chen, and Norman appealed and had their sentences reduced to 20 years, while the life sentences for Czugaj and Stephens were upheld.

On 6 September 2006, it was revealed that as a result of appeals brought by prosecutors and heard by the Supreme Court, Chen had the death penalty reimposed after his reduced sentence of life imprisonment was overturned. Rush, Nguyen and Norman also had their appeal verdicts overturned and the death penalty imposed. The new death sentences were unexpected. Prosecutors, in their appeals against the 20-year terms faced by most of the nine, had only called for them to be upgraded to life imprisonment. Czugaj's life sentence, after being reduced to 20 years on appeal, was reinstated. Stephens' life sentence was upheld on appeal as were Sukumaran's and Chan's death sentences. Lawrence had not lodged a further appeal to her 20-year sentence, so her sentence was not rejudged.

On 6 March 2008, it was revealed that three of the four Bali Nine (Norman, Chen and Nguyen) who were issued death sentences on appeal had their sentences reduced to life imprisonment. The reduction was not officially announced, but court sources confirm that the judges decided to spare their lives. In August 2010, Rush launched his final appeal to overturn the death penalty, and was granted a judicial review, which commenced on 18 August 2010. On 10 May 2011, Rush's appeal was successful as his sentence was reduced to life imprisonment. On 21 September 2010, the leaders of the drug-smuggling ring, Chan and Sukumaran, appealed against their pending death-row sentence and to reduce their jail time to 20 years, instead of the previous life sentence. On 17 June 2011, it was announced that Chan's final judicial appeal had been rejected on 10 May. On 7 July 2011, it was announced that Sukumaran's final judicial appeal was dismissed. On 10 December 2014, the President of Indonesia Joko Widodo stated in a speech that he would not approve any clemencies for drug offences. On 30 December, Sukumaran's plea for clemency was rejected; and Chan's plea for clemency was rejected on 22 January 2015.

=== Summary of sentences ===
All of the Bali Nine were convicted of drug trafficking of heroin.

Summary of sentences
Defendant	From	Notes
Andrew Chan	Enfield, New South Wales	Sentenced to execution by firing squad on 14 February 2006 by the Denpasar District Court; Sentence upheld upon appeal to the Bali High Court on 26 April 2006; Judicial review lodged with the Denpasar District Court on 13 August 2010; Sentence upheld upon appeal to the Indonesian Supreme Court on 10 May 2011; Pleas for clemency was rejected by the Indonesian president Joko Widodo on 22 January 2015; Final appeal for judicial review rejected by the Denpasar District Court on 4 February 2015; On 6 April 2015, State Administrative court rejects subsequent appeal against Presidential rejection of clemency.; Executed on 29 April 2015 by firing squad at Nusa Kambangan prison.
Si Yi Chen	Doonside, New South Wales	Sentenced to life imprisonment by the Denpasar District Court on 15 February 2006; Sentence reduced to 20 years upon appeal by Judge Arsan Pardede in the Bali High Court on 26 April 2006; On appeal, Supreme Court imposes the death penalty on 6 September 2006; On appeal, Supreme Court reduces sentence to life imprisonment on 6 March 2008; Served time in Kerobokan Prison; Returned to Australia on 15 December 2024
Michael Czugaj	Oxley, Queensland	Sentenced to life imprisonment by the Denpasar District Court on 14 February 2006; Sentence reduced to 20 years upon appeal by Judge Arsan Pardede in the Bali High Court on 26 April 2006; On appeal, Supreme Court reinstates sentence of life imprisonment on 6 September 2006; Served time in Kerobokan Prison; Returned to Australia on 15 December 2024
Renae Lawrence	Newcastle, New South Wales	Sentenced to life imprisonment by the Denpasar District Court on 13 February 2006; Sentence reduced to 20 years upon appeal by Judge Arsan Pardede in the Bali High Court on 26 April 2006; Five-month remission on Merdeka Day on 17 August 2009; Initially served time in Kerobokan Prison; in 2013 transferred to Negara, Bali after authorities accused her of a plot to kill jail guards; in 2014 transferred to Bangli, Bali; Sentence commuted, released on 21 November 2018.
Tan Duc Thanh Nguyen	Brisbane, Queensland	Sentenced to life imprisonment by the Denpasar District Court on 15 February 2006; Sentence reduced to 20 years upon appeal by Judge Arsan Pardede in the Bali High Court on 26 April 2006; On appeal, Supreme Court imposes the death penalty on 6 September 2006; On appeal, Supreme Court reduces sentence to life imprisonment on 6 March 2008; Initially served time in Kerobokan Prison; in 2014 transferred to Malang, East Java when it was reported he had violated prison rules; Died from cancer June 2018 in a Jakarta hospital
Matthew Norman	Sydney	Sentenced to life imprisonment by the Denpasar District Court on 15 February 2006; Sentence reduced to 20 years upon appeal by Judge Arsan Pardede in the Bali High Court on 26 April 2006; On appeal, Supreme Court imposes the death penalty on 6 September 2006; On appeal, Supreme Court reduces sentence to life imprisonment on 6 March 2008; Served time in Kerobokan Prison; Returned to Australia on 15 December 2024
Scott Rush	Chelmer, Queensland	Sentenced to life imprisonment by the Denpasar District Court on 13 February 2006; On appeal, Bali High Court imposes the death penalty on 6 September 2006; On appeal, Supreme Court reduces sentence to life imprisonment on 10 May 2011; Initially served time in Kerobokan Prison; in 2014 transferred to Karangasem, Bali; Returned to Australia on 15 December 2024
Martin Stephens	Towradgi, New South Wales	Sentenced to life imprisonment by the Denpasar District Court on 14 February 2006; Sentence of life imprisonment upheld upon appeal by Judge Lanang Parbawa in the Bali High Court on 26 April 2006; On appeal, Supreme Court upheld sentence of life imprisonment on 14 January 2011; Initially served time in Kerobokan Prison; in 2014 transferred to Malang, East Java, when it was reported he had violated prison rules; Returned to Australia on 15 December 2024
Myuran Sukumaran	Auburn, New South Wales	Sentenced to death on 14 February 2006 by the Denpasar District Court; Sentence upheld upon appeal on 26 April 2006 by the Bali High Court; Sentence upheld upon appeal to the Indonesian Supreme Court on 6 July 2011; Plea for clemency was rejected by the Indonesian president Joko Widodo on 30 December 2014; Final appeal for judicial review rejected by the Denpasar District Court on 4 February 2015; On 6 April 2015, State Administrative court rejects subsequent appeal against Presidential rejection of clemency.; Executed on 29 April 2015 by firing squad at Nusa Kambangan prison.

=== Appeals ===
There were several avenues of appeal available to the Bali Nine. Lawyers had seven days post-sentencing to lodge appeals. There is no time limit for those convicted to request clemency from the President of Indonesia, but this requires an admission of guilt and had never been granted for a drug crime until 2009. All appealed to overturn their sentence. The sentences of Chen, Czugaj, Nguyen, Norman and Stephens stand at life imprisonment and Lawrence's sentence remains at 20 years after appeal. In May 2011, Rush's death sentence was reduced to life after he launched a final appeal in August 2010.

Chan and Sukumaran launched final appeals to have their death sentences reduced in August 2010. Chan lost his appeal to the Indonesian Supreme Court on 10 May 2011 and Sukumaran's appeal was dismissed on 6 July 2011. Both made pleas for clemency to the Indonesian president that were rejected in December 2014 and January 2015.

In late January 2015, lawyers for Chan and Sukumaran filed an application for a judicial review into their cases; which was rejected by the Denpasar District Court a few days later. Meanwhile, with a spokesperson for the Indonesian Attorney General stating that requests for judicial review did not preclude the execution process proceeding, Indonesian officials continued planning for the imminent execution of Chan and Sukumaran:

On 9 February 2015, lawyers for Chan and Sukumaran launched a rare challenge against the Indonesian president's refusal to grant them pardons; which was dismissed by the Indonesian government a day later.

On 6 April 2015, the State Administrative Court rejected an appeal by Chan and Sukumaran, ruling that they could not challenge the decision by the Indonesian president to not grant them clemency in court. One of their lawyers announced that a further appeal would be lodged with the Indonesian Constitutional Court to examine Widodo's refusal to give clemency. However, the Indonesian Attorney-General accused the lawyers of simply trying to buy time, and announced that there would be no more delays to the executions.

=== Execution of duo ===
Chan and Sukumaran were executed by firing squad early on 29 April 2015 on Nusa Kambangan prison island, along with six other prisoners convicted for drug offences. The six other men were Zaenal (or Zainal) Abidin (an Indonesian), Rodrigo Gularte (a Brazilian), and four Nigerians: Sylvester Obiekwe Nwolise, Raheem Agbaje Salami, Okwudily (or Okwudili) Oyatanze and Martin Anderson. Filipina Mary Jane Veloso was given a last-minute stay of execution following a pending investigation initiated in her home country about a drug trafficking syndicate in which she is expected to testify.

The executions were widely supported among the Indonesian public, while foreign diplomats protested against them.

=== Reaction in Australia ===
A candlelight vigil hosted by the Mercy Campaign, entitled Music for Mercy, was held in Sydney's Martin Place on the evening of 29 January 2015 in support of Chan and Sukumaran. The concert featured performances by Archibald Prize artist Ben Quilty, musicians Megan Washington, Josh Pyke, Kate Miller-Heidke, Paul Mac, Glenn Richards from Augie March, and The Presets' and Julian Hamilton; with media personalities Andrew Denton and his partner Jennifer Byrne and musician Missy Higgins who recorded video messages of support for Chan and Sukumaran. Amnesty International organised similar vigils in Federation Square, Melbourne and in Adelaide, Canberra, and Byron Bay.

Julian Oldmeadow, an academic at Swinburne University in Melbourne expressed in a lecture following the executions of Chan and Sukumaran that he had planned to ask Indonesian international students to leave his class. He has since apologised for his statements.

A poll was conducted by Roy Morgan Research from 27 February to 1 March 2015. The poll revealed that 53 per cent of Australians opposed the execution of Andrew Chan and Myuran Sukumaran while 47% supported it. Muhammad Prasetyo, Indonesia's attorney general, was reported as saying that there was strong support in Australia for the death penalty.

=== Related arrests ===
On 27 April 2005, Indonesian police shot and killed Man Singh Ghale, a known major Indonesian drug trafficker believed to be directly connected to the Bali Nine. Ghale, of Australian origin, was killed when police stormed his home.

Australian Federal Police commissioner Mick Keelty said Ghale was "directly linked" to the Bali Nine. Six men aged between 19 and 25 were arrested and released on bail in Brisbane on drug trafficking charges believed to be associated with the Bali Nine. On 12 February 2006, police arrested Do Hyung Lee, a 25-year-old of South Korean origin, at Brisbane Airport after arriving on a flight from South Korea. Lee was charged with drug trafficking and importation offences and appeared in the Brisbane Magistrates Court on 13 February 2006, the same day the first of the nine accused in Indonesia learned of their fate. Lee was bailed to reappear in court with the five others on 3 April 2006. Keelty told a Senate estimates committee hearing that more arrests were expected.

== Prior criminal records and charges ==
Details of previous criminal convictions of some of the accused were not published during the trial to avoid harming legal defences in Indonesia. Once the Denpasar District Court reached guilty verdicts and issued sentences, it was reported in the Australian media that members of the group had been convicted of offences in Australia before their arrests in Indonesia. In December 2004 Rush had pleaded guilty at the Inala Magistrates' Court in Queensland to 16 offences including drug possession, fraud, theft and drunk-driving. A warrant for his arrest in Australia remains in place over the theft of $A4,797 from the Commonwealth Bank via a forged cheque. Czugaj, also of Brisbane, has 14 convictions for offences including theft, wilful damage, traffic offences and fare evasion.

Lawrence and Norman were arrested on 26 March 2005 in New South Wales, while travelling along the Pacific Highway in a stolen Ford Laser after police used road spikes to intercept the stolen vehicle. Both were due to appear in the Gosford Magistrates Court to face car theft- and traffic-related charges. On 26 April 2005, they failed to appear due to their imprisonment in Indonesia a week earlier on 17 April 2005. Lawrence admitted, after her arrest in Indonesia on 17 April 2005, of having visited Bali twice before: in October and November 2004. She and Chan had made an earlier successful run with heroin from Bali to Australia during their October visit. The second delivery, scheduled for December 2004, was aborted when the heroin suppliers failed to deliver. She provided a statement to police saying she was paid $A10,000 for the successful heroin delivery but later retracted her statement.

== Reaction after execution ==
Amnesty International strongly condemned the executions of Chan and Sukumaran together with six other drug-related convicts on 29 April 2015, describing them as "reprehensible". Diana Sayed, Human Rights Lawyer and Crisis Campaigner, said "The death penalty is always a human rights violation, but there are a number of factors that make today's executions even more distressing." The Australian ambassador to Indonesia was recalled after Chan and Sukumaran were executed. Australian Prime Minister Tony Abbott stated that the executions were "cruel and unnecessary", claiming both men had been "fully rehabilitated" during their detention in prison. Opposition leader Bill Shorten agreed, saying he was "disgusted" at the execution.

President Joko Widodo defended the executions, stating that he did not regret on his decision to carry forward with the executions and all countries must respect Indonesia's rights to enforce its laws. After Abbott linked the executions of Chan and Sukumaran with Australia's tsunami relief contributions, Indonesia's foreign ministry angrily reacted and said Abbott's remarks were "threats".

== Repatriation to Australia ==
Renae Lawrence's sentence was commuted in 2018. She was released and deported on 21 November 2018.

In November 2024, Prime Minister Anthony Albanese lobbied the new Indonesian president Prabowo Subianto for the remaining five members of the Bali Nine still imprisoned in Indonesia to be transferred to Australian prisons to continue serving their sentences; the Indonesian government later confirmed it would consider Albanese's request.

On 15 December 2024, the five remaining members of the Bali Nine (Si Yi Chen, 39, Michael Czugaj, 38, Matthew Norman, 38, Scott Rush, 39, and Martin Stephens, 48) arrived back in Australia on a commercial Jetstar flight. They were not required to serve any further prison time in the country.

== See also ==
- List of Australians convicted of crimes
- List of Australians imprisoned or executed abroad
