= Marist Catholic College North Shore =

Coeducational Catholic K–12 school in North Sydney, Australia

Location
- 270 Miller Street & 40 Ridge Street; Lower North Shore; North Sydney, New South Wales, 2060; Australia; 33°49′53″S 151°12′27″E

Information
- Other names: MCNS; Marist North Shore
- Former names: Marist Brothers High School North Sydney; Marist Brothers Mosman; Marist College North Shore; St Mary's Catholic Primary School; Practice and Demonstration school of St Joseph's Training School
- Type: Catholic Coeducational Central Day School
- Motto: Latin: Virtus Ubique Vincit (Courage Conquers All)
- Religious affiliation: Marist Brothers
- Denomination: Roman Catholicism
- Patron saints: St Marcellin Champagnat, St Mary of the Cross MacKillop
- Established: 2 July 1888; 138 years ago
- Founder: Walter Moore
- Educational authority: New South Wales Department of Education
- Oversight: Catholic Education Office of the Archdiocese of Sydney
- Principal: Anthony Boys
- Assistant Principal (St Mary's Campus): Sean White
- Assistant Principal (La Valla Campus): Robert Nehme
- Years: K–12
- Enrolment: c. 1700 (2025)
- Campuses: St Marys Campus (Grades K–6), La Valla Campus (Grades 7–12)
- Houses: Aquinas, Barangaroo, Chisholm, Fourviere, O'Connor, Xavier
- Colours: Navy, gold and cerise
- Song: Latin: Sub Tuum Praesidium
- Athletics: Metropolitan Catholic Colleges Sports Association
- Publication: The High Notes, The Maristian
- Yearbook: The Maristian
- Feeder schools: Sacred Heart Catholic Primary Mosman; Blessed Sacrament Catholic Primary Clifton Gardens; St Michaels Catholic Primary Lane Cove
- Affiliations: Association of Marist Schools of Australia
- Website: mccns.syd.catholic.edu.au

Marist Catholic College North Shore (often shortened to Marist North Shore or abbreviated as MCCNS) is an independent systemic Roman Catholic K–12 coeducational precinct (day school), located in North Sydney, Australia.

Established in 1888, Marist Catholic College North Shore is conducted by Sydney Catholic Schools, based on the teachings of its patrons St. Marcellin Champagnat and St Mary of the Cross MacKillop. The school caters to roughly 1300 students from Kindergarten to Year 12. The precinct is administered by the Catholic Education Office for the Archdiocese of Sydney, and is affiliated with the Association of Marist Schools of Australia (AMSA), as well as the Metropolitan Catholic Colleges Sports Association (MCC).

== History ==
=== Marist Brother's School North Sydney (1888–1916) ===
Marist Brother's School North Sydney was first established on 2 July 1888 by the school's first headmaster, Br Walter Moore. Originally catering for boys in primary to intermediate years (Years 1–10), the school would not go on to teach Secondary (Years 7–12) years until 1965 and then in 2021 would change again to educate both girls and boys from Kindergarten through to Year 12.

The Marist Brothers originally opened the school in response to the educational needs of the poor in the North Sydney area, which was, at the time, a low socioeconomic area. The school was the fourth Marist School opened in Australia after Church Hill (1872), Parramatta (1875) and Hunters Hill (1881) and had a teaching staff of three Brothers and an enrolment of 65 boys. The school initially started as a two-room campus on the site of what is now the St Mary's Campus (Ridge Street).

The school was established with the motto "Esse Non Videri" (Latin), which is translated to, "to be, not to seem".

=== Marist Brothers High School North Sydney (1916–1965) ===
In 1916, the school's enrolments had reached an excess of 300 students and the limited campus was inadequate to educate comfortably. In response to this, the school moved sites to what is now the La Valla Campus (Carlow Street) but had previously been a local business, Mark Foy's Furniture Repository before 1916. It had been purchased by the Parish Priest at the time, Fr. Cornish SJ and converted into classrooms and a hall known as the Manresa Hall. Once the transformation of the school's campus was completed, the school was named Marist Brother's High School North Sydney.

=== "Practice and Demonstration" School of St Joseph's Training School (1916–1955) ===
After the Marist Brothers left what is now called the St Mary's Campus (Ridge St) in 1916, the Sisters of St Joseph moved their primary school which was originally at a site on Mount Street to the vacated school. This new primary school became known as the "Practice and Demonstration" School of St Joseph's Training School. In the term of the first principal Sr Mary Donatres Egan RSJ, the demand for Catholic education in North Sydney grew to the point where the school extended to educate from primary to secondary education which included the building of a new school on the Mount Street property the school originated on. This new school specialised in commercial subjects; cooking, domestic Science and dressmaking.

In 1955, when the Archbishop of Sydney established an Education Office, both the Mount Street Commercial and Domestic Science School and Ridge St's "Practice and Demonstration" school of St Joseph's Training School combined. The Ridge St campus was to educate the primary students, and the Mount Street campus became the senior campus for pupils from Ridge Street, Naremburn and Lavender Bay. At the end of 1955, the Sister's of St Joseph vacated the school and transferred to Lavender Bay; the Sisters of Mercy took over and renamed the school St Mary's.

=== St Mary's Catholic Primary School (1955–2021) ===
St Mary's Catholic Primary School North Sydney

Location
- 40 Ridge Street; Lower North Shore; North Sydney, New South Wales, 2060; Australia

Information
- Other names: St Mary's
- Former names: Practice and Demonstration school of St Joseph's Training School
- Type: Independent Coeducational Primary Day School
- Motto: Aspire, Inspire, & Make a Difference
- Religious affiliations: Jesuit, Marist, Josephite and Mercy Religious Orders
- Denomination: Roman Catholicism
- Established: 26 February 1888; 138 years ago
- Founder: Walter Moore
- Status: Closed
- Educational authority: New South Wales Department of Education
- Oversight: Catholic Education Office for the Archdiocese of Sydney
- Years: K–6
- Gender: Coeducational
- Houses: Ignatius, McAuley, Marcellin and MacKillop
- Affiliations: Association of Marist Schools of Australia
- Website: http://www.stmns.catholic.edu.au/

In 1956, St Mary's became solely a primary school, education boys and girls from Kindergarten to Year 4. The construction of the expressway saw the demolition of a large part of the school campus which affected enrolment with there being only 69 students by 1978.

In 1980, however, there was an increased demand for primary education which saw the school extend to teach Kindergarten to Year 6 with enrolment back up to 186 by 1989. This year saw the introduction of the first Lay principal, Mrs Susan Clifton, the school was a single stream school with an entire Lay staff. By the early 1990s it became evident that the school was overdue for construction.

Beginning on 12 October 1992, a construction project which had been approved by St Mary's Parish Priest Fr Joseph Sobb, began. Being entirely funded by the parents and parishioners of St. Mary's School and Parish, the project included the upgrading and refurbishment of the existing building and outside areas. As well as this, a new school block of six classrooms was built adjacent to the existing building. The Blessing and Official Opening of the new building and renovations took place on 24 October 1993. Bishop Peter Ingham presided and over five hundred people were in attendance.

In 2010 as a result of Federal Government funding, the kindergarten to Year 4 learning environments were refurbished and extended along with two new learning areas for Years 5 and 6. These new and refurbished areas were designed and constructed with the intention of creating flexible learning areas and in 2011 and 2012 after a research project collaboration with UTS were further enhanced with new furniture suitable for a higher reliance on technology and flexibility.

In 2012, the North Sydney Parish and St Mary's Catholic Primary School Hall was completed for gathering, recreational and performance purposes.

In 2014, a second stream of kindergarten classes was introduced with the entire school becoming two streamed in 2020.

A construction project in 2015 saw the conjunction of the existing school buildings to form additional classrooms and learning areas.

The most recent phase of construction on the St Mary's campus began in 2017 with the purchase of the property on the West hand side of the school. After demolishing the existing buildings on the property, the St Mary's school building was extended onto the new property with four temporary demountable classrooms installed on the Presbytery grounds to cater for classrooms displaced during construction. After the completion of the construction in February 2018, the demountable classrooms remained to accommodate the students of Marist Catholic College North Shore whilst their campus was renovated in 2020.

=== Marist Brothers / Sacred Heart, Mosman (1922–1965) ===
In 1922, the Marist Brothers opened their fourteenth school in Australia. Located in Mosman, Marist Brother's Mosman was an all boys Catholic high school. The school colours were blue, black and gold school motto was the Latin phrase; "Virtus Ubique Vincit" meaning "Courage Conquers All".

The school was associated and a part of the Sacred Heart parish in Mosman and the corresponding Catholic primary school, Sacred Heart Catholic Primary School.

=== Marist College North Shore (1965–2020) ===
Marist College North Shore

Information
- Other names: MCNS; Marist North Shore
- Former names: Marist Brothers High School North Sydney; Marist Brothers Mosman
- Type: Independent co-educational secondary day school
- Motto: Latin: Virtus Ubique Vincit (Courage Conquers All)
- Religious affiliation: Marist Brothers
- Denomination: Roman Catholicism
- Patron saint: St Marcellin Champagnat
- Established: 2 July 1888; 138 years ago
- Founder: Walter Moore
- Status: Closed
- Educational authority: New South Wales Department of Education
- Oversight: Catholic Education Office of the Archdiocese of Sydney
- Years: 7–12
- Houses: Aquinas, Barangaroo, Chisholm, Fourvière, O'connor, Xavier
- Colours: Blue, black and gold
- Song: Latin: Sub Tuum Praesidium
- Athletics: Metropolitan Catholic Colleges Sports Association
- Publication: The High Notes, The Maristian
- Yearbook: The Maristian
- Feeder schools: Sacred Heart Catholic Primary School; St Mary's Catholic Primary School
- Affiliations: Association of Marist Schools of Australia
- Website: www.maristcollege.com

After 1916, the next major change to Marist Brother's High North Sydney was in response to the 1965 Wyndham Scheme which saw the merging of Marist Brothers Mosman and Marist Brothers High School North Sydney to create a completely new school.

The new school was named Marist College North Shore and was a Secondary school (Years 7–12) for boys in the North Sydney and Mosman area. The college adopted the colours blue, black and gold and the former Marist Brothers Mosman school motto, "Virtus Ubique Vincit" (Latin) meaning "Courage Conquers All". Sacred Heart Primary School, although no longer a part of the school, remained as a feeder school to Marist College North Shore. This change of school saw a complete redesign and reconstruction of the campus.

In 1996, the La Valla Centre was opened for use as a multi-purpose educational facility comprising a hall, art rooms, computer laboratories, music classrooms and practice rooms, Design and Technology workshops, and other assorted facilities and offices. In 2007 the most recent building project was completed. The Coyle Centre contains a new library, additional classrooms, and food technology kitchens. In addition several buildings and sections of the school were given names such as the Mosman Wing in homage to Marist Brothers Mosman and the Manresa Courts.

In 2017, the Academic Resource Centre (Library) underwent construction which saw the removal of most staff offices from the library and a larger area available to students. This was due to a school wide removal of department specific staff-rooms where instead of there being individual staff-rooms for the staff of each department, a larger centralised staff-room was available for all teaching staff. The only department to retain a separate staff-room was the PDHPE department whose offices remained in the College Fitness Centre.

In 2021 the College changed from single-sex education to a co-educational institution.

==== Marist College North Shore Houses ====
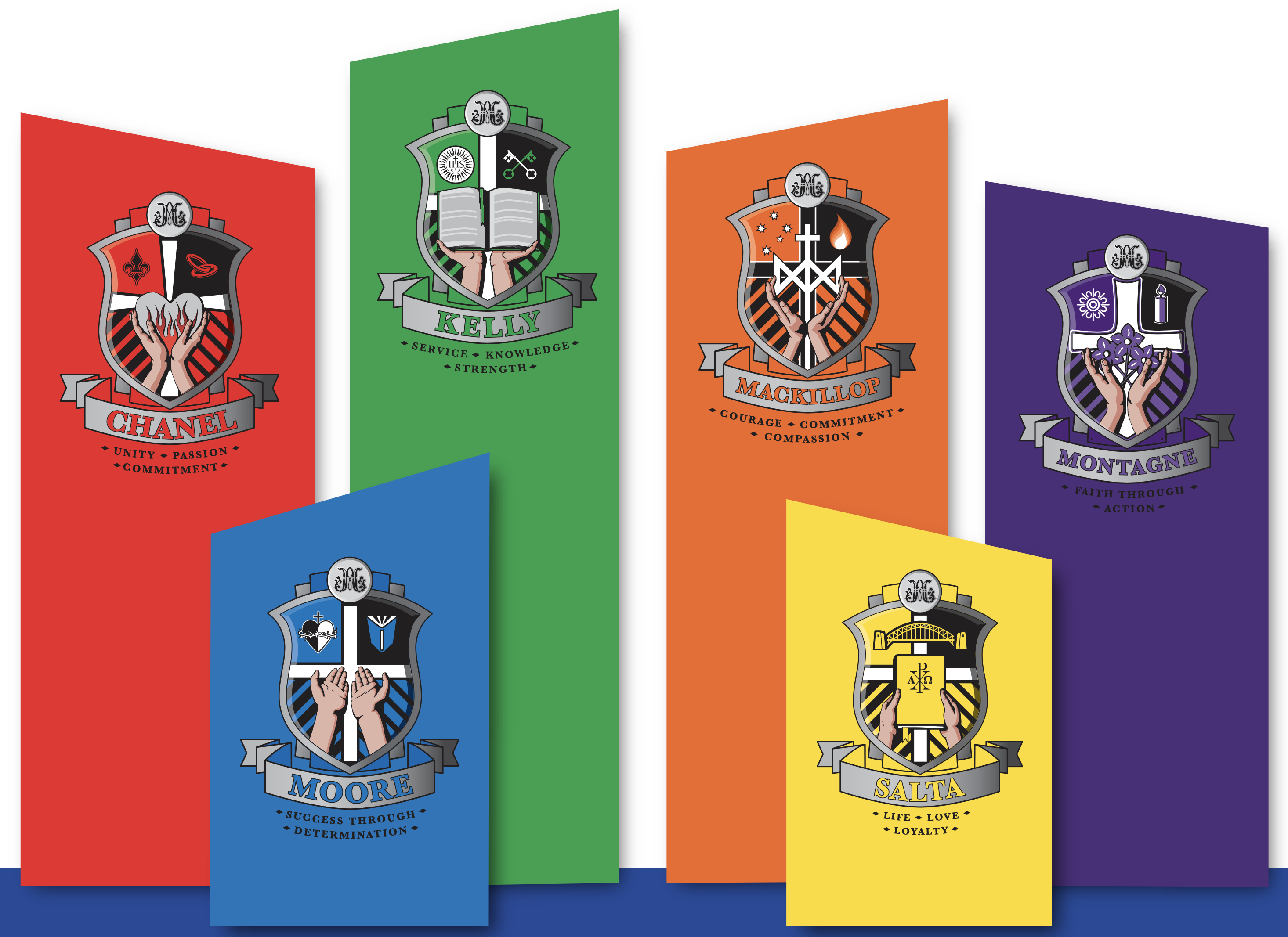
Marist College North Shore Houses

The school uses the house system. Prior to 2006, the four college houses were Chanel, Xavier, Marcellin and Sykes. In 2014, the school decided to increase the number of houses from four to six. The new houses of Mackillop and Montagne were established, becoming functional in 2015.

=== Marist Catholic College North Shore (2021–present) ===
On 27 June 2018, at a symposium for parents, parishioners and senior leaders, it was announced that the North Sydney Catholic School Network's Marist Catholic College North Shore and neighbouring co-ed primary school St Mary's would combine to become a new North Sydney Educational Precinct. This new precinct named Marist Catholic College North Shore consists of two campuses which offer students stage-specific contemporary learning spaces and provide a seamless curriculum pathway from Kindergarten to Year 12. The school is run by Sydney Catholic Schools, taking over from the Marist Brothers and the Sisters of Mercy from Marist College North Shore and St Mary's respectively. Primary education continues on the St Mary's Catholic Primary School campus under the shortened campus name of St Mary's, whilst secondary learning takes place on the former Marist Catholic College North Shore campus, now named La Valla campus.

Both La Valla and St Mary's campus kept the existing leadership teams who would oversee their respective campus whilst running the educational precinct as a whole in a combined team.

From 3 September 2018; Marist Catholic College North Shore opened its first wave of applications for both boys and girls for Year 7 2021.

The new educational precinct did not continue with the former houses for both the primary and secondary campus, but created a new system that was consistent across the two campuses.

== Motto ==
The schools motto is "Virtus Ubique Vincit" which is Latin for "Courage Conquers All".

When the school was initially established it had the motto Esse Non Videri", which was Latin for, "to be, not to seem". Courage Conquers All – Marist Catholic College North Shore Motto.

== Academic results ==
HSC Results
Year	Rank	Success Rate	Total Credits	Exams Sat	Year 12 Students
2009	273				
2010	98	16%	79		83
2011	247				
2012	363				
2013	230	6.7%	44		109
2014	177	8.5%	58		118
2015	187	8.8%	56	640	109
2016	145	11.1%	75	674	116
2017	128	13%	88	676	114
2018	123	12.7%	75	589	102
2019	195	8.3%	48	577	98
2020	131	12.79%	84	657	111

== Facilities ==
=== La Valla campus ===
Major facilities of the La Valla Campus include:

- Walter Moore Building – classrooms, offices, ICT centre.
- La Valla Centre – hall, conference room, storage areas, kitchen, art rooms, design and technology workshops, computer laboratories, health room, music practice rooms, music classrooms, Moore House office, canteen.
- The Andrew Power Centre (APC) – faith formation offices, counsellors office, careers advisor's office, general purpose religious education area, storage areas, Chanel, Kelly, MacKillop, Montagne and Salta House offices.
- The Mosman Wing – administration offices, board room, sick bay, staff accommodation, classrooms, storage areas, archives, science laboratories and prep. rooms, drama studio.
- Manresa Courts – basketball courts, cricket nets
- Coyle Centre – food technology classrooms, kitchens, MacKillop Library, media room and classrooms.
- Fitness Centre – gym equipment, fitness and training area. PDHPE staff offices.

Other notable named locations in the school include:

- The Costello Quadrangle – Within the walls of the Mosman Wing where most informal whole school or other partial group meetings and assemblies take place.
- The O'Mara Plaza – A quadrangle named in memory of The O'Mara Green which was demolished and subsequently replaced with the Coyle Centre and its namesake plaza. In 2020 a roof was added and renovations were done to modernise the plaza.
- St Leonards Park – Opposite College used for PE and Recess and Lunch

== Precinct crest ==
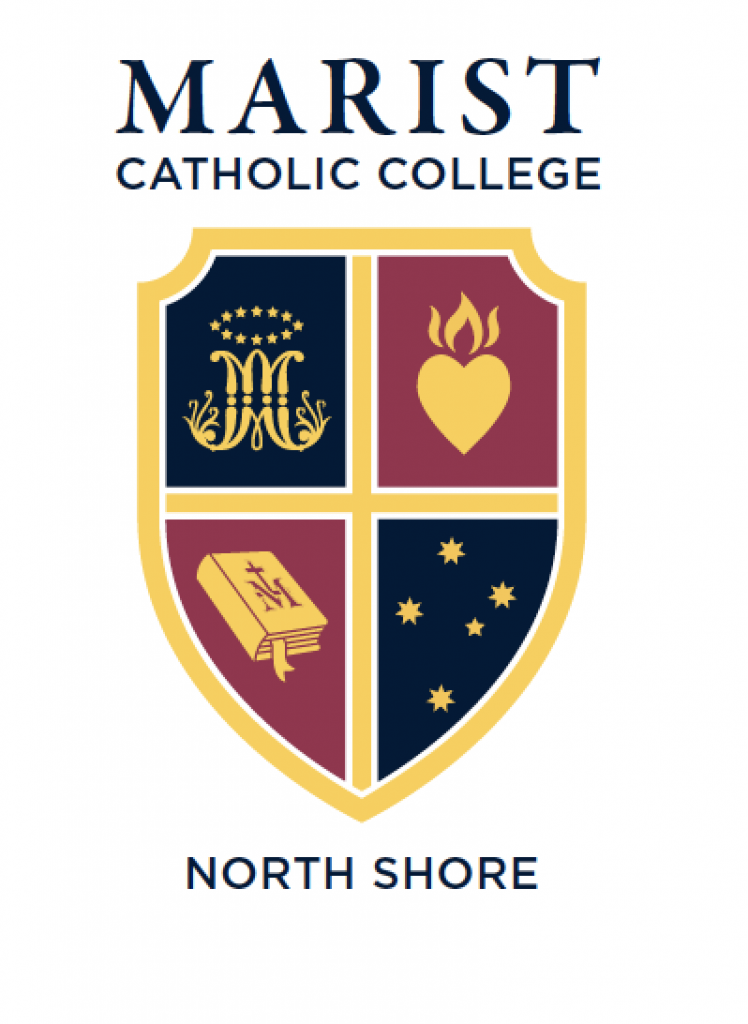
Crest with College name.

- Font: Garamond, used in the time of the founding Marist father, St Marcellin Champagnat.
- Bible stamped with the Miraculous Medal: Illustrates Marist Catholic College North Shore's Marist charism, which values love and care for others. The Miraculous Medal is a medal design based on the visions of St. Catherine Labouré in the 19th century. (Formerly on the St Mary's Catholic Primary School crest)
- Mary's Monogram: The Marist symbol – Ave Maria, crowned with twelve stars – (Book of Revelation 12.1) highlights the Precinct's connection to Mary, the mother of Jesus. It combines A and M representing Ave Maria (Hail Mary). The twelve stars are a reference to the woman of the Apocalypse, a Christian picture of Mary and her role in bringing Christ to birth. (Formerly on the Marist College North Shore crest)
- Southern Cross: Symbolises the history that both Marist College North Shore and St Mary's Catholic Primary School had. Also symbolising Australia, being a reminder of the student's and staff's duty as citizens. The stars of the cross are also used to represent the four moral virtues of justice, prudence, temperance, and fortitude. (Formerly on the Marist College North Shore crest)
- Stylised Crucifix: Symbolises the Catholic Faith held by the school.
- Sacred Heart: Symbolises the Jesuit charism of the local parish and the connection between the Mosman parish. Represents Jesus' heart. (Formerly on the Marist College North Shore and St Mary's Catholic Primary School crest)
- Precinct Colours: Navy, gold and cerise

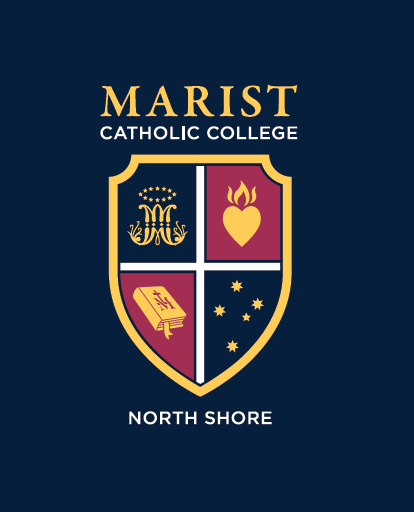
Marist Catholic College North Shore Logo (Dark Background)

== Houses ==
The current houses for the Precinct have been in effect since 2021;

=== Aquinas ===
Named in honour of St Thomas Aquinas; patron saint of universities and scholars.

Colour: Yellow

=== Barangaroo ===
Named in honour of Barangaroo; a Cammeraygal leader of the Eora Nation at the time of European colonisation.

Colour: Orange

=== Chisholm ===
Named in honour of Caroline Chisholm; a Catholic philanthropist who provided outreach to vulnerable immigrants to the early European Colony in Australia, particularly women and children.

Colour: Blue

=== Fourvière ===
Named in honour of the French district of Fourvière where St Marcellin Champagnat and his followers made their pledge promising to devote themselves to the foundation of the Society of Mary, effectively beginning Marist education.

Colour: Purple

=== O'Connor ===
Named in honour of Mother Eileen O'Connor, Founder of Our Lady's Nurse of the Poor and most likely candidate to be Australia's next saint.

Colour: Green

=== Xavier ===
Named in honour of St Francis Xavier; is credited for his idea that the missionary must adapt to the customs and language of the people he evangelises, and for his advocacy of an educated native clergy.

Colour: Red

== Sport ==
The college competes in inter-school sport competitions through the Metropolitan Catholic Colleges Sports Association (MCC).

Other MCC member schools are: Marcellin College Randwick, Marist College Pagewood, Marist College Kogarah, De La Salle College Ashfield, LaSalle Catholic College Bankstown, Christian Brothers' High School Lewisham and Holy Cross College Ryde. The college has held sporting rivalries with the other member schools for many years.

Summer sports include basketball, cricket, tennis, and touch football. Winter sports include rugby league, football (soccer), and water polo. Other sports available throughout the year within the MCC include athletics, cross country running, golf, squash, swimming, and volleyball.t

== Notable alumni ==
=== Entertainment, media and the arts ===
- Steve Ahern OAM – radio broadcaster, Director of Radio at AFTRS, international broadcasting consultant
- Steve Balbi – Australian singer-songwriter – Noiseworks
- Dan Ewing – actor
- Kyle Linahan – Australian singer-songwriter and media presenter
- Mike Munro – television journalist
- Dean Lewis – singer/songwriter.

=== Politics, law, and business ===
- Geoffrey Bellew – former justice of the Supreme Court of New South Wales and Chairperson of the State Parole Authority of NSW – College Captain in 1977
- Brian Sully – former justice of the Supreme Court of New South Wales
- Mick Young – federal government minister and national president of the Australian Labor Party

=== Sport ===
- Chris Caruana – rugby league player
- Kieran Foran – rugby league player
- Liam Foran – rugby league player
- Ken Irvine – rugby league player
- Guy Leech – ironman
- Paul Conlon – rugby league player
- Mark Roberts – Australian rules footballer
- Mitchell Pearce – rugby league player
- Daniel Petkovski – football player for the Sydney FC
- Eddie Scarf – Olympic (Bronze medal) and Empire Games (Commonwealth Games Gold Medal)
- Matt Shirvington – Olympic athlete
- Simon Taufel – cricket umpire

== See also ==
- List of Catholic schools in New South Wales
- Catholic education in Australia
