= Marcellin College Randwick =

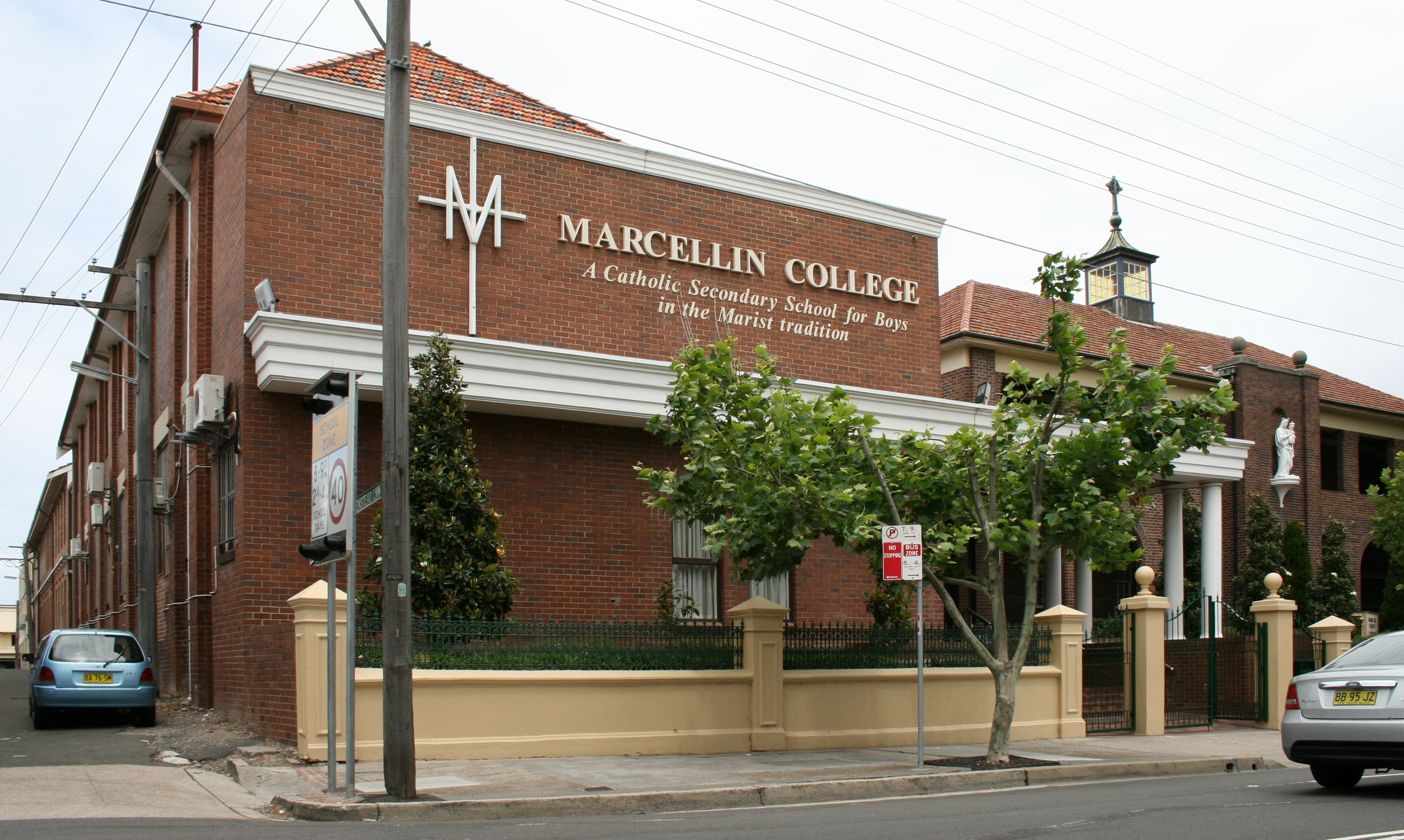
- Front corner of Marcellin College Randwick

Location
- 195 Alison Road; Randwick, New South Wales, 2031; Australia; 33°54′49″S 151°14′27″E

Information
- Type: Independent secondary day school
- Motto: Latin: Æterna non caduca (The Eternal, not the Transitory)
- Religious affiliation: Marist Brothers
- Denomination: Roman Catholicism
- Patron saint: Saint Marcellin Champagnat
- Established: 29 January 1923; 103 years ago
- Educational authority: New South Wales Education Standards Authority
- Oversight: Sydney Catholic Schools
- Principal: Mark Woolford
- Staff: 88
- Years: 7–12
- Gender: Boys
- Enrolment: 958 (2022)
- Colours: Cerise and blue
- Song: Sub Tuum
- Affiliations: Association of Marist Schools of Australia
- Website: marcellinrandwick.syd.catholic.edu.au

Marcellin College Randwick is an independent systemic Catholic secondary day school for boys, located in Randwick, a suburb in the Eastern Suburbs of Sydney, New South Wales, Australia. Founded by the Marist Brothers in 1923, the college is overseen by the Sydney Catholic Schools of the Archdiocese of Sydney. The school currently caters for approximately 960 students from Years 7 to 12.

The college is affiliated with the Association of Marist Schools of Australia (AMSA) and was previously a member of the Metropolitan Catholic Colleges Sports Association (MCC).

== History ==
Marist Brothers founded the college as part of the worldwide Congregation of Marist Colleges which began in 1816 under the guidance of the French priest, Marcellin Champagnat SM.

Archbishop Kelly visited Randwick in 1921, and pressed for the establishment of a school for boys. Land became available in Alison Rd and on 4 November 1922 Dr Sheehan laid the first stone which now forms part of the College Wall. Dr Cyril Fallon campaigned for funds. Br Walstan Curtin was the first headmaster, and welcomed the first students on 29 January 1923. Originally the brothers traveled from Darlinghurst and Hunters Hill, until Br Aquinas managed to purchase the house adjoining the college, and then it became the living quarters for the Brothers. The Marist Brothers have managed the college ever since.

The College celebrated its 90 Year Anniversary in 2013 with a range of special events, celebrations & functions. A new College Sculpture, named Eternity was erected in 2013 in honour of the college's 90 Year landmark and as part of a major revamp of the college's courtyard. It was commissioned and sculpted by sculptor Col Henry. It was blessed on 17 May 2013 at the college's 90 Year Gala Dinner.

In early 2014, major capital works commenced at Marcellin. Planning for these works had been underway since late 2011. The scope of the works includes:

- a new library with additional learning spaces and major internal refurbishment
- a multi-purpose space to replace the Year 7 rooftop playground
- a new canteen
- landscaping in the bottom yard
- Food Technology and Hospitality facilities
- a Drama performance space
- alterations to the Marist Centre

The works were completed by the beginning of the 2015 school year.

At the end of the 2014 academic year, Br David Hall concluded his term as Headmaster at Marcellin College. Mr John Hickey was later appointed as his successor, becoming the 24th and first lay Headmaster of the college.

== Headmasters ==
The following individuals have served as Headmaster of Marcellin College Randwick:

Ordinal	Headmaster	Term start	Term end	Time in office	Notes
1	Br Walstan Curtin FMS	1923	1925	1–2 years	
2	Br Andrew Power FMS	1926	1931	4–5 years	
3	Br Ignatius O’Connor FMS	1932	1937	4–5 years	
4	Br Damian Willis FMS	1938	1940	1–2 years	
5	Br Louis Hughes FMS	1941	1941	0 years	
6	Br Albertus Sellenger FMS	1942	1944	1–2 years	
7	Br Quentin Duffy FMS	1945	1950	4–5 years	
8	Br Edmundus Larkin FMS	1951	1955	3–4 years	
9	Br Bede Yates FMS	1956	1956	0 years	
10	Br Anselm Saunders FMS	1957	1962	4–5 years	
11	Br Wilfrid Quail FMS	1963	1965	1–2 years	
12	Br Laurence McKeon FMS	1966	1967	0–1 years	
13	Br Demetrius Redford FMS	1968	1973	4–5 years	
14	Br Kenneth Sim FMS	1974	1977	2–3 years	
15	Br Roger Burke FMS	1978	1983	4–5 years	
16	Br Paul Fensom FMS	1984	1984	0 years	
17	Br Ernest Houston FMS	1985	1986	0–1 years	
18	Br Anthony Robinson FMS	1987	1989	1–2 years	
19	Br Robert O’Connor FMS	1990	1994	3–4 years	
20	Br Patrick Howlett FMS	1995	2001	5–6 years	
21	Br Robert Sutton FMS	2002	2002	0 years	
22	Br William Sullivan FMS	2003	March 2010	6–7 years	
23	Br David Hall FMS	April 2010	2014	3–4 years	
24	John Hickey	2015	September 2018	1–2 years	
25	Mark Woolford	October 2018	incumbent	7–8 years	

== Academic ==
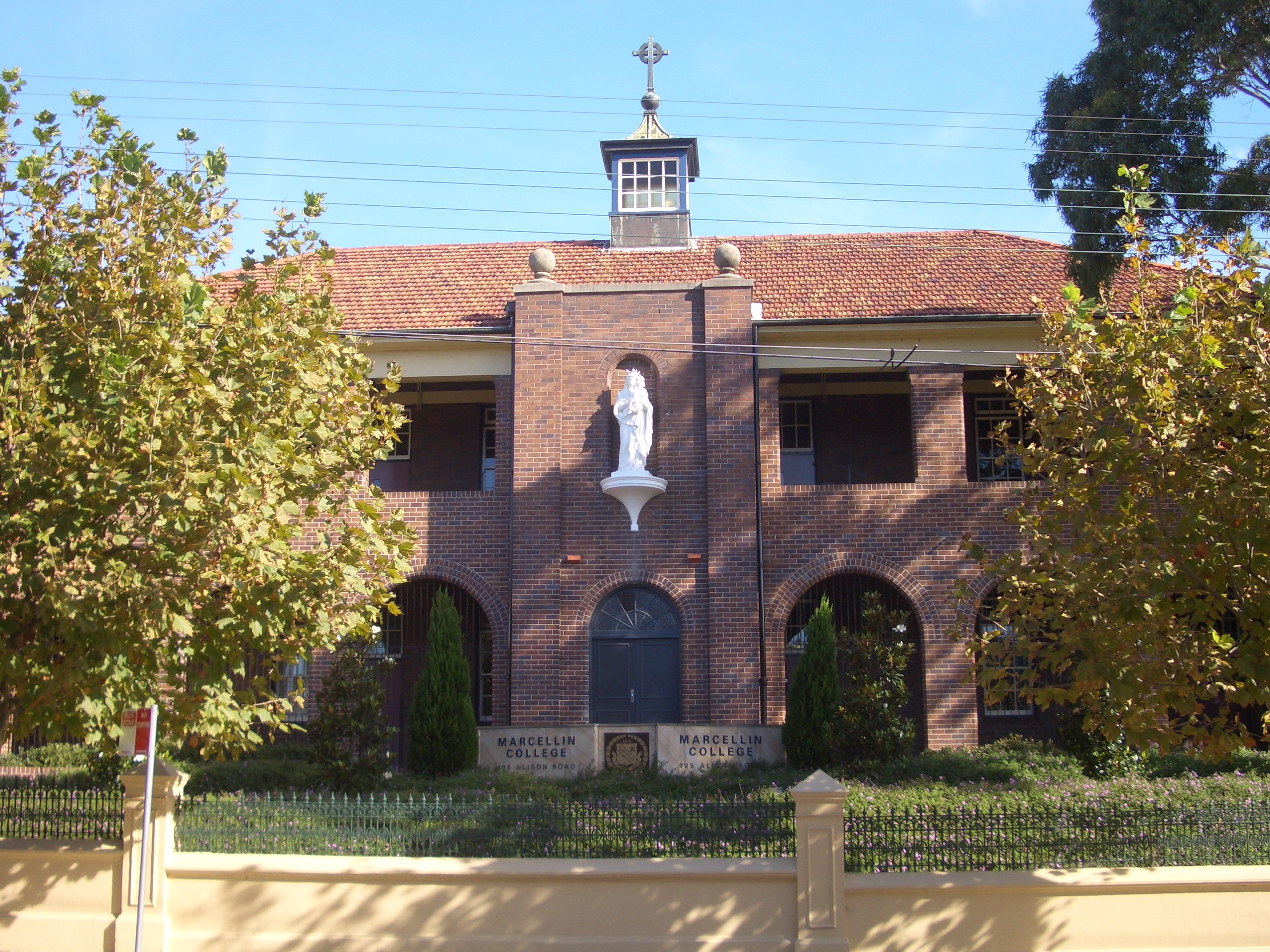
Front of Marcellin College facing Alison Road, Randwick

Marcellin College has always achieved strong academic results, with students regularly attaining Universities Admission Index (UAI) scores of over 90. In 2005, student Christopher Beshara achieved a UAI 100, the first student in Marcellin College Randwick to achieve a UAI 100 - many other students achieving over UAI 91 annually. Following the release of the 2007 NSW Higher School Certificate (HSC) results, The Daily Telegraph ranked Marcellin College 78th in the top 200 best performing schools in New South Wales. In addition to HSC success, the school has achieved in academic pursuits such as debating, oratory and chess.

== Sport ==
Marcellin College was a former member of the Metropolitan Catholic Colleges (MCC) sport program. Through this association, the college competed against schools such as Marist College Kogarah, Christian Brothers' High School, Lewisham, De La Salle College Ashfield, Marist Catholic College North Shore, Champagnat Catholic College Pagewood, St. Leo's Catholic College and LaSalle Catholic College, Bankstown, in a variety of sports including swimming, athletics, soccer, rugby league, tennis, golf, volleyball, touch football, basketball, squash and cricket. (Also rugby union, but it was disbanded in 2009).

Traditionally, Marcellin College has a strong history in sport (see below) with many students progressing to the elite level in their chosen sport, notably in rugby league, along with swimming.

== Notable alumni ==
Marcellin College Randwick alumni are traditionally known as "Old Boys", with the school's Alumni association called the "Marcellin College Ex-Students Association". Some notable Marcellin Old Boys include:

Business

- Charlie Bell – former president and CEO of McDonald's

Clergy and religious

- Br Charles Howard FMS – Superior General of the Marist Brothers 1985–1993
- Most Rev David Walker – Bishop of Broken Bay 1996–2013

Entertainment, media and the arts

- Mitchell Butel – actor
- Luke Carroll – actor
- Kerry Casey – actor
- Jon Cleary – author
- James Galea – magician and actor
- Bob Hornery – actor
- Peter James – cinematographer and director of photography
- Michael Lynch – arts administrator

Medicine and science

- Merv Cross – doctor of sports medicine and rugby league player

Politics, public service and the law

- Lionel Bowen – politician; Deputy Prime Minister of Australia from 1983 to 1990
- Michael Daley – politician; Attorney General of New South Wales since 2023.
- John Lawrence O'Meally – judge
- Greg Smith – politician; Attorney General of New South Wales from 2011 to 2015.
- Rafał Trzaskowski – politician; Mayor of Warsaw since 2018, ran for President of Poland in 2020 and 2025.

Sport

- Malcolm Allen – swimmer
- Braith Anasta – rugby league player
- Tom Bellew OAM – former chairman of the New South Wales Rugby League and Director of the Australian Rugby League
- Luke Branighan – rugby league player
- Shawn Budd – snooker player
- Richard Chee Quee – first player of Chinese origin to play first-class cricket in Australia
- Michael Cheika – rugby union coach and former rugby union player, Australian national team (Wallabies) head coach since 2014, NSW Waratahs coach 2013–2015
- Jason Clark – rugby league player
- Ben Davis – AFL player for the Adelaide Crows
- Denis Donoghue – boxer & rugby league player
- Andrew Durante – football player, Wellington Phoenix FC captain, 2008 Joe Marston Medal recipient
- Jordan Foote – AFL player
- Dr Nathan Gibbs – rugby league player
- Campbell Graham – rugby league player
- Aaron Gray – rugby league player
- Errol Gulden – AFL player
- Marty Gurr – rugby league player
- Lachlan Lam – rugby league player
- Reni Maitua – rugby league player
- Darren Maroon – rugby league player
- Shannan McPherson – rugby league player
- Jeff Orford – rugby league player
- Rick Pendleton – paralympic swimmer
- Willie Peters – rugby league player
- Eddy Pettybourne – rugby league player
- Sam Robson – Australian-English first-class cricketer
- Iosia Soliola – rugby league player
- John Sutton – rugby league player
- Tom Symonds – rugby league player
- Peter Tunks – rugby league player
- Joe Williams – rugby league player and professional boxer
- Ken Wright – rugby union and rugby league player

== See also ==
- List of Catholic schools in New South Wales
- Catholic education in Australia
