= Foran =

Foran is a surname of Irish origin. Notable people with the surname include:

- Charles Foran (born 1960), Canadian novelist
- Dick Foran (1910–1979), American actor
- Greg Foran (born 1961), New Zealand businessman
- Jim Foran (1848–1928), American baseball player
- John Winston Foran (born 1952), Canadian politician
- Kieran Foran, (born 1990), New Zealand rugby league player
- Liam Foran (born 1988), New Zealand rugby league player
- Mark Foran (born 1973), English footballer
