= De La Salle College Ashfield =

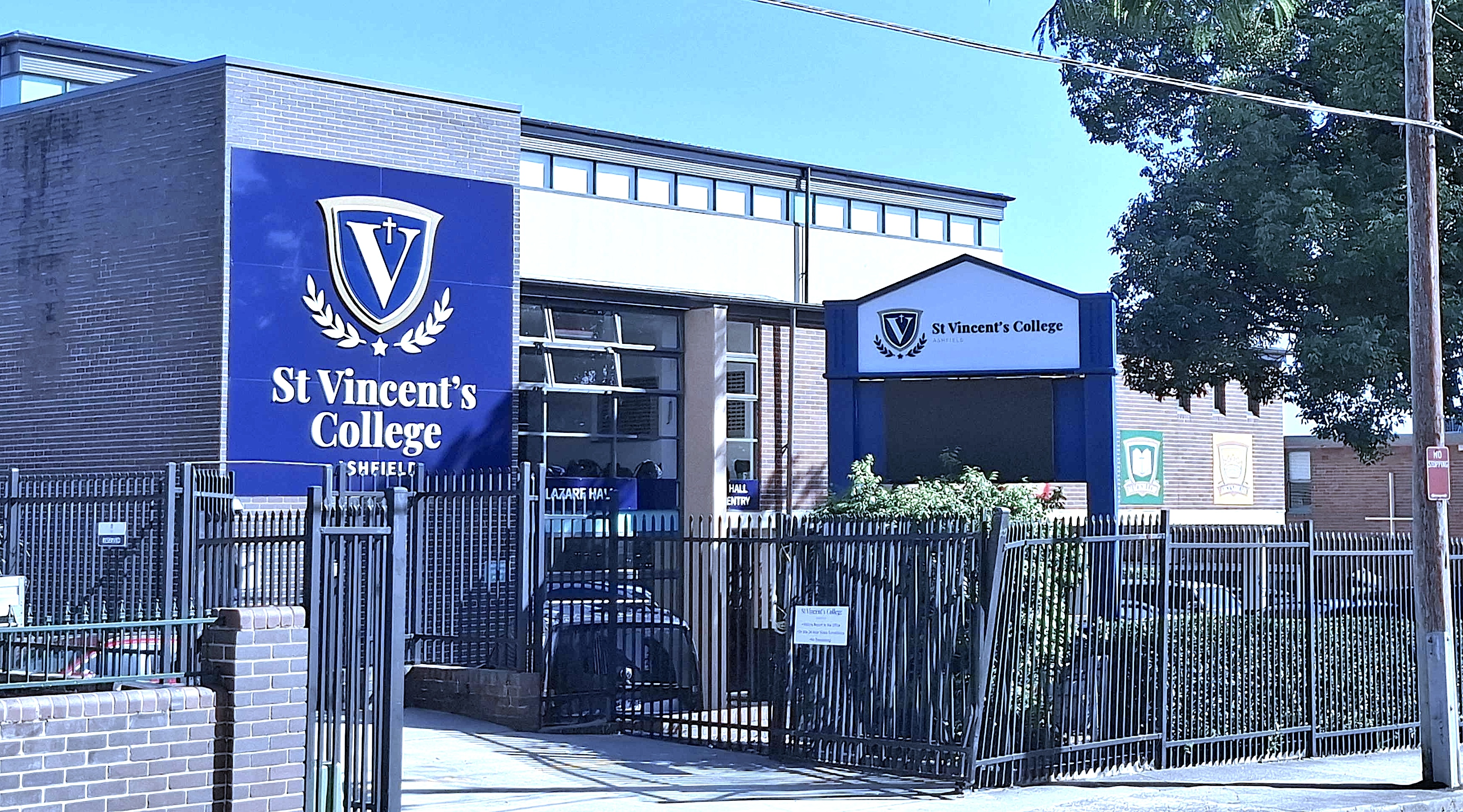
- Former Bland St exit of De La Salle College Ashfield, pictured in March 2026 as a repurposed building used by St Vincent's College Ashfield

Location
- Ashfield, Sydney, New South Wales, 2131; Australia; 33°53′3″S 151°7′31″E

Information
- Type: Independent, comprehensive, single-sex school, secondary school, day school
- Motto: Latin: Esto Vir (Used in context as "to be the best man you can be." If translated directly from Latin it means "Be a man")
- Religious affiliation: De La Salle Brothers
- Denomination: Roman Catholic
- Established: 10 December 1916
- Status: Closed
- Closed: 20 December 2022
- Staff: ~58
- Key people: De La Salle Brothers; John Baptist de La Salle
- Years: 7–12
- Gender: Boys
- Enrolment: c. 384 (2021)
- Language: Australian English
- Campus: Suburban
- Houses: Maurice; Bernard; Kevin; John
- Colours: Blue and white
- Sports: Metropolitan Catholic Colleges Sports Association
- Yearbook: Signum Feidei (1926–1945); Blue & White (1945–2023)
- Affiliation: Catholic Secondary Schools Association NSW/ACT
- Alumni: Old Boys
- Website: dlsashfield.catholic.edu.au

De La Salle College was an independent Roman Catholic comprehensive single-sex secondary day school for boys, located in Ashfield, an inner-western suburb of Sydney, New South Wales, Australia. In 2022, the school announced plans to amalgamate with the adjacent girls' high school, Bethlehem College, and St Vincent's Primary School, due to increasing demand for co-educational schools in inner Sydney. Since 2023, the former campus does not exist as an independent school but remains a campus of the co-educational college St Vincent's College Ashfield, that was formed in the amalgamation.

Established in 1916 by the De La Salle Brothers and Vincentian Fathers, the college catered to students in Year 7 to Year 12 from the inner-west Parishes of the Archdiocese of Sydney. The college was under the patronage of the Archbishop of Sydney, Anthony Fisher. De La Salle College was one of 18 Lasallian Schools in Australia, and in the 1970s became the first Catholic high school in Australia to have a lay headmaster.

The school is affiliated with the Catholic Secondary Schools Association NSW/ACT, and the Metropolitan Catholic Colleges Sports Association (MCC).

In education, the college was fully accredited in 2018 to run the Newman Selective Gifted Education Program (the Gifted and Talented program), which caters towards the significant learning needs of capable students. The program is currently being facilitated in a number of the Catholic Primary and Secondary Schools within Sydney Catholic Schools. The school also used Inquiry-Based Learning approach, focusing mainly on the Solution Fluency framework. They offered a number of co-curricular activities and experiences, including immersions to Lasallian schools overseas. The school followed the NSW Syllabus and Australian Curriculum.

== History ==
The foundation stone for the school was laid on 10 December 1916. Upon completion a year later, the school consisted of just three classrooms, and was located behind a boarding house that was to become a monastery for the six De La Salle brothers who were given the task of educating Catholic boys of the Ashfield parish.

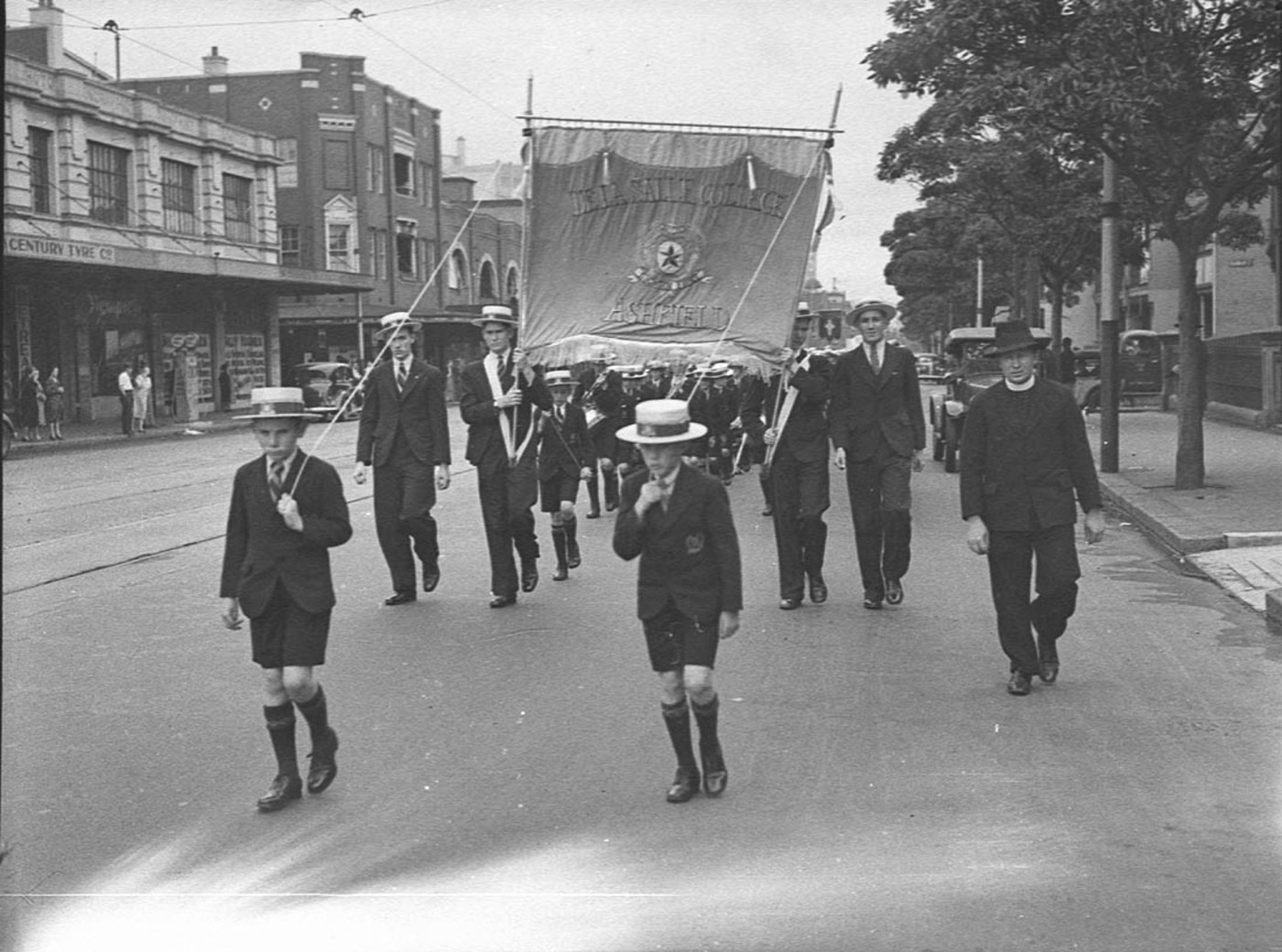
De La Salle College students in the Saint Patrick's Day pageant, 1939

Despite the effects of the Great Depression, enrolments continued to increase, with 300 on the role in 1931. Through the efforts of Father Macken, a provincial of the Vincentian Fathers, the college established a separate primary school in 1934. Further, a "tech" was established in 1937 for boys who would not be going on to university or office jobs. The two-stream system of "pros" and "techs" continued until 1955.

Lay staff were employed in 1956 as the number of brothers had declined. The 1960s saw further change with the Wyndham scheme introduced in 1962 necessitating the addition of new subjects to the curriculum, and thus requiring more specialist rooms. With support from the parish and the Old Boys' Union, the principal of the time, Br Peter, began to expand the college. The main building of the college opened in 1966 during the celebration of its Golden Jubilee.

Logo used prior to 2010, still used on uniforms until the school's dissolution in 2022

In 1972, Peter Donnan became the first lay principal of the school, thus making the school the first Catholic high school in Australia administered by a lay principal. The college's primary section closed in 1988.

In 2008, five new science laboratories were completed and an air-conditioned multi-purpose hall with seating for up to 1500 and a full theatrical lighting and sound system was added. The college hall hosted the World Youth Day 2008 Journey of the Cross and Icon (JCI) in Sydney.

In 2013, the college began implementing its student laptop program where all students could have their own personal device, now called Bring Your Own Designated Device (BYODD).

=== Principals ===
The following individuals have served as College Principal or any precedent title since the College's opening in 1917. The last principal was Paul Forrester.

Principals of De La Salle College, Ashfield
Ordinal	Officeholder	Name of office	Term start	Term end	Time in office
1	Br Benignus Patrick		1917	1920	2–3 years
2	Br Jerome Foley		1920	1921	0–1 years
3	Br Victor (incomplete)		1921	1922	0–1 years
4	Br Leopold (incomplete)		1922	1923	0–1 years
(1)	Br Benignus Patrick		1923	1925	1–2 years
5	Br Edward Joseph		1925	1927	1–2 years
6	Br Thomas (incomplete)		1927	1928	0–1 years
(4)	Br Leopold (incomplete)		1928	1930	1–2 years
7	Br Julian Lennon		1930	1936	5–6 years
(5)	Br Edward Joseph		1936	1938	1–2 years
8	Br Victor Aengus		1938	1941	2–3 years
(5)	Br Edward Joseph		1941	1942	0–1 years
9	Br George Benedict		1942	1948	5–6 years
10	Br Baptist Will		1948	1951	2–3 years
11	Br Aloysius Carmody		1951	1953	1–2 years
(10)	Br Baptist Will		1953	1955	1–2 years
12	Br Cassian Corbett		1955	1961	5–6 years
13	Br Peter McIntosh		1961	1967	5–6 years
14	Br Michael Lynch		1967	1972	4–5 years
15	Peter Donnan	College Principal	1972	1981	8–9 years
16	Allan Coman	College Principal	1981	1987	5–6 years
17	Peter McNamara	College Principal	1987	1992	4–5 years
18	Patrick O'Connor	College Principal	1992	1996	3–4 years
19	Thomas Galea	College Principal	1996	2001	4–5 years
20	Michael Barrington	College Principal	2001	2013	11–12 years
21	Phil Gane	Acting College Principal	2013	2014	1 year
22	Stephen Kennaugh	College Principal	2014	2018	5 years
23	Paul Forrester	College Principal	2019	2022	4 years

== Sport ==
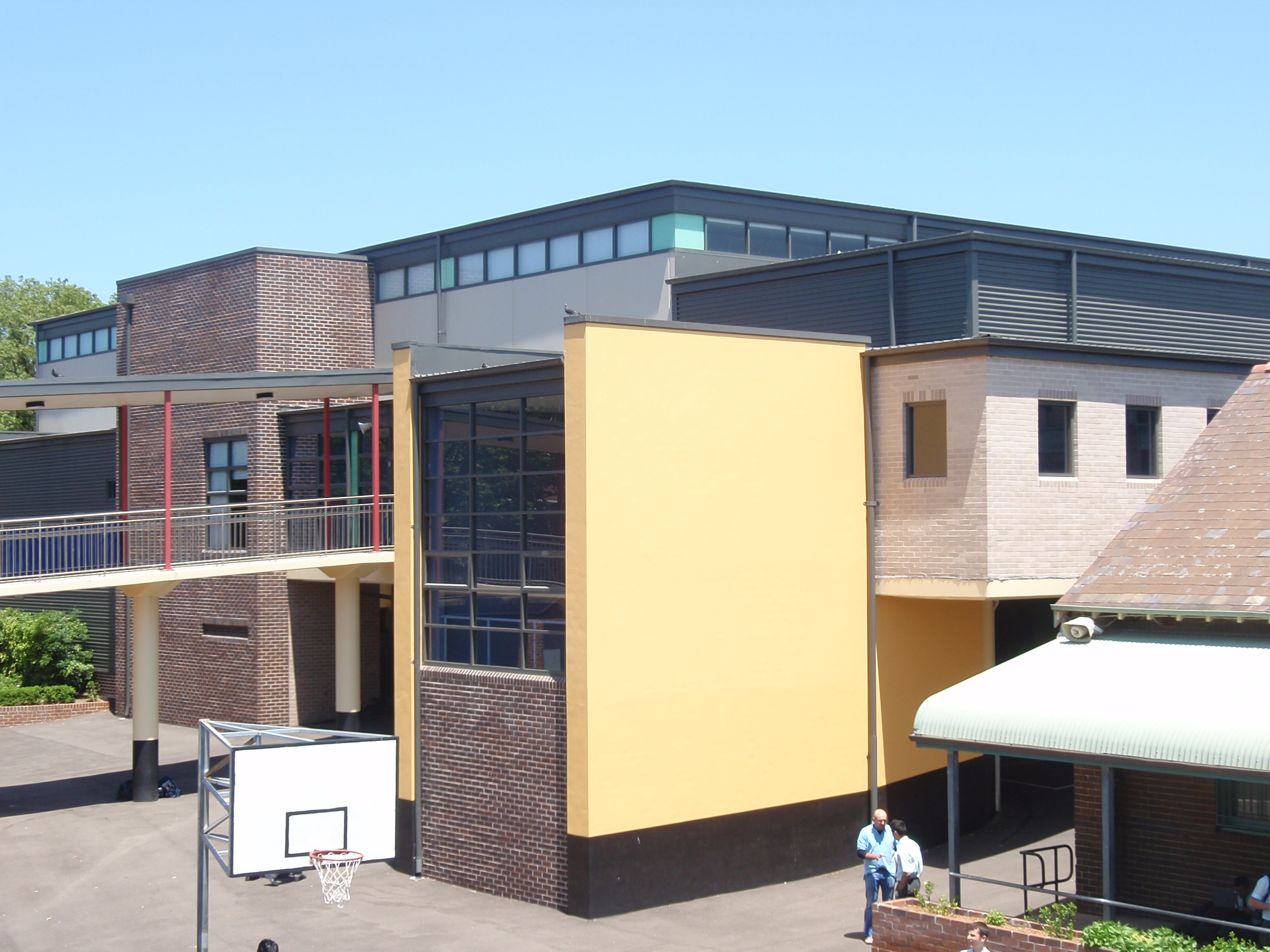
New College Hall in November 2009

De La Salle College was a member of the Metropolitan Catholic Colleges Sports Association (MCC), and competed in a range of sports including athletics, cricket, cross country, basketball, golf, rugby league, soccer, squash, swimming, tennis, touch football and volleyball.

Through MCC, the college competed against schools such as Christian Brothers' High School, Lewisham, LaSalle Catholic College, Bankstown, Marcellin College Randwick, Marist College Kogarah, Champagnat Catholic College Pagewood, Holy Cross College Ryde and Marist Catholic College North Shore. Sport was traditionally an important part of college life, notwithstanding the school's own limited sporting facilities.

The college also had a number of elite sporting pathways for students who excel at particular sports and wish to play or compete at a professional level.

== Notable alumni ==
- Mike Bailey – TV weatherman and radio presenter for the Australian Broadcasting Corporation (also attended De La Salle Bankstown)
- Paul Bevan – AFL player for Sydney Swans
- Colin Brooks – politician, Member of the Victorian Legislative Assembly for Bundoora
- Nathaniel Buzolic – actor, known for his role as Kol Mikaelson on the CW show The Vampire Diaries and its spin-off The Originals.
- Tony Costa – Archibald Prize winning artist
- Pat Drummond – singer song-writer
- Robbie Farah – rugby league player for the Wests Tigers and South Sydney Rabbitohs, and a representative for New South Wales rugby league team
- Warren Fellows – Convicted drug runner and associate of Neddy Smith
- Michael Maher – former politician, variously Member for Drummoyne and Member for Lowe
- Paul Pantano – actor
- Gerard Price – cricket player and Cricket NSW cricket manager
- Michael Rowland – TV news presenter
- John Sidoti – politician, Member for Drummoyne (2011–2023)
- Salvatore Coco – Actor
- Paul Whelan – former NSW politician
- Justice Philip Woodward – former Judge of the Supreme Court of New South Wales

== See also ==
- List of Catholic schools in New South Wales
- Lasallian educational institutions
- Catholic education in Australia
