= Metropolitan Catholic Colleges Sports Association =

- Formation: 1915; 111 years ago
- Dissolved: 2021; 5 years ago
- Headquarters: Sydney, New South Wales, Australia
- Website: mccsport.com.au

The Metropolitan Catholic Colleges Sports Association (MCC) was an association of eight Roman Catholic secondary schools in Sydney, New South Wales, Australia, that share common interests, ethics, educational philosophy and competed in sporting competitions among themselves.

== Member schools ==
=== Former member schools ===
Member schools	Location	Founded	Left	Colours
Champagnat Catholic College	Pagewood	1961	2021	Black and gold
Christian Brothers High School	Lewisham	1891	2021	Navy, sky blue and gold
De La Salle College	Ashfield	1916	2021	Navy and white
Holy Cross College	Ryde	1891	2021	Maroon and gold
LaSalle Catholic College	Bankstown	1999	2021	Green and white
Marcellin College	Randwick	1923	2021	Cerise and blue
Marist College Kogarah	Bexley	1909	2021	Red, navy and white
Marist College North Shore	North Sydney	1888	2021	Navy, cerise and gold
St Leo's Catholic College	Wahroonga	1956	2013	Purple, gold and white

== Sports ==
=== Current ===
- Athletics
- Basketball
- Cricket
- Cross Country
- Football (Soccer)
- Rugby League
- Squash
- Swimming
- Touch Football
- Tennis
- Volleyball
- Golf

=== Discontinued ===
- Rugby Union

The MCC has discontinued their rugby union competition between the associated schools; however, they remain fielding teams in the Under 16s and Under 18s divisions at the NSWCCC Rugby Union Carnival.

=== NSWCCC Performances ===
Over the past several years, the MCC has had success with at least four boys who had once competed for MCC now in first-grade rugby league; (in order of NRL debut) Mitchell Pearce, Liam Foran, Jamal Idris and Kieran Foran.

In 2011, the MCC U/16's side placed first in the NSWCCC rugby union carnival being undefeated during the two-day carnival, winning their games 32–5, 10–7 and 20–12, however only 3 boys made the NSWCCC U/16's side and 3 making the shadow side (in case of injury). 2 boys from the U/18's team also made their respective NSWCCC squad.

== See also ==
- List of Catholic schools in New South Wales
- Catholic education in Australia
