= John Lawrence O'Meally =

Australian judge (1939–2024)

The Honourable Judge John Lawrence O'Meally, AM, RFD (18 November 1939 – 4 October 2024) was an Australian judge who was president of the Dust Diseases Tribunal of New South Wales. He was a barrister from 1964. He was the first judge to hear a dust diseases case in the tribunal after it was created in 1989. O'Meally was also Australia's longest serving judge, having spent 32 years on the bench, when he retired on 17 November 2011. He died on 4 October 2024, at the age of 84.

== Education ==
Marcellin College Randwick and the University of Sydney.

== Appointments ==
- Admitted to the NSW Bar and Australian Bars 1964
- Judge of the Compensation Court of New South Wales 1984–2003
- Judge of the District Court of New South Wales 2003–2011
- President of the Dust Diseases Tribunal of New South Wales 1998–2011
- Senior Member of the Dust Diseases Tribunal of New South Wales 1995–1998
- Member of the Dust Diseases Tribunal of New South Wales 1989–1995
- Judge Eastern Caribbean Supreme Court 2001
- Judge of the High Court Antigua and Barbuda 2001
- Judge of the Workers Compensation Commission of New South Wales 1979–1984
- Acting Judge of the National Court of Justice, Papua New Guinea 1977

== See also ==
- Judiciary of Australia
