= Frank Cicutto =

Australian business executive (1950–2025)

- Born: Francis John Cicutto; 1950; Spilimbergo, Italy
- Died: 10 January 2025 (aged 74–75); Melbourne, Victoria, Australia
- Other name: Frank Ciccutto
- Education: Benilde High School; St John's College, Lakemba; University of New South Wales (BCom)
- Occupations: Business executive; banker
- Years active: 1967–2007
- Employer: National Australia Bank
- Spouse: Christine Cicutto
- Children: 1

Francis John Cicutto (1950 – 10 January 2025) was an Australian business executive and banker. He was chief executive officer of the National Australia Bank (NAB) from 1999 to 2004.

== Early life ==
Cicutto was born in 1950 in Spilimbergo, Italy. At the age of 2, his family migrated to Australia during the post-war migration wave from Europe, eventually settling in Leichhardt, New South Wales, in the inner west of Sydney. He was educated at Benilde High School in Bankstown and St John's College in Lakemba. He studied for a Bachelor of Commerce at the University of New South Wales.

Cicutto played Sydney Grade Cricket for the Bankstown District Cricket Club and was club secretary from 1972 to 1975. He later moved to Melbourne, where he coached for the Ringwood Cricket Club in Ringwood, Victoria.

== Career ==
Cicutto joined the National Australia Bank in 1967 as a 17-year-old and was employed by the bank for 37 years, leaving as chief executive officer in 2004.

He held multiple executive positions in the company, including executive vice president for the Americas in 1988, chief executive officer of Clydesdale Bank from 1994 to 1996 and as chief general manager for Australian financial services from 1996 to 1998. In 1998, Cicutto was appointed to the board of directors as chief operating officer, before being elected chief executive officer the following year. He resigned from National Australia Bank in 2004, amid the controversial foreign currency trading scandal, which involved losses of A$360 million covered up by NAB options traders.

Cicutto was the chair of the Australian Bankers' Association from 1999 to 2001. He also chaired property management company Run Corp from 2005 to 2007, with his resignation resulting from the company having experienced heavy losses during the tenure.

== Personal life and death ==
Cicutto lived in Canterbury in Melbourne, Victoria. He died on 10 January 2025 following an illness.
