= George Ndaira =

Former Lebanon international rugby league footballer

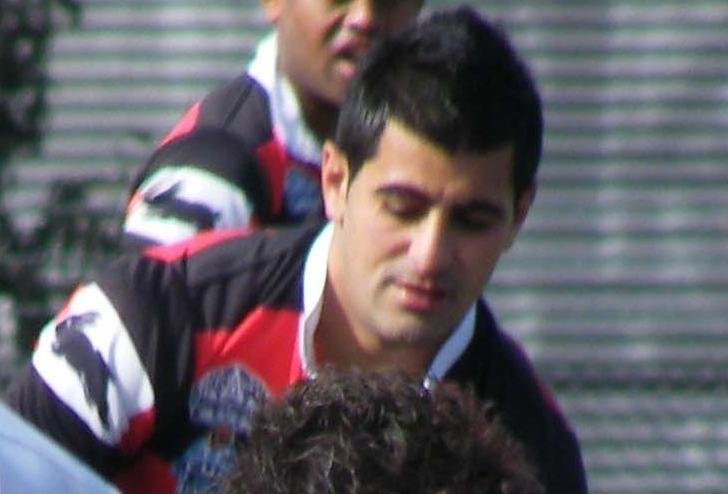

Personal information
- Born: 22 February 1985 (age 41) Sydney, New South Wales, Australia

Playing information
- Height: 177 cm (5 ft 10 in)
- Weight: 86 kg (13 st 8 lb)
- Position: Hooker, Halfback
Club
Years	Team	Pld	T	G	FG	P
2006	St. George Illawarra	3	0	0	0	0
2008	South Sydney	14	0	2	0	4
2009–10	Newcastle Knights	8	0	1	0	2
	Total	25	0	3	0	6
Representative
Years	Team	Pld	T	G	FG	P
2007–09	Lebanon	9	2	13	0	34

George Ndaira (born 22 February 1985) is an Australian professional rugby league coach who is the head coach of the Newtown Jets in the New South Wales Cup and a former professional rugby league footballer who played in the 2000s and 2010s.

He played at international level for Lebanon, and at club level in the National Rugby League (NRL) for the St. George Illawarra Dragons, South Sydney Rabbitohs and Newcastle Knights, as a hooker or halfback.

== Background ==
George Ndaira was born in Sydney, New South Wales, Australia, and is of Lebanese descent.

== Rugby league career ==
=== Playing career ===
Ndaira was a part of the 2005 St George Illawarra Dragons Jersey Flegg Grand Final side. He played his school football at Marist College Kogarah and was coached by Dave Callander and Mark Hildebrandt.

He made his first grade debut in 2006 for the St George Illawarra Dragons. He played three first grade games with the Dragons. In 2007, joined the Sydney Roosters, however, he did not play a first grade game for the club, playing mostly in the reserve grade team. In 2008, he joined South Sydney Rabbitohs, playing fourteen games for the club in the season, and scoring four points (by kicking two goals).

In 2009, he joined the Newcastle Knights. He played there for two seasons. After the 2010 season, Ndaira was released from the Knights so he could sign with local Newcastle club, Kurri Kurri Bulldogs. However, this was short-lived, and he joined the Wests Tigers in 2011. While waiting for a spot in the Tigers' first grade team, he played for the Tigers' feeder side in the NSW Cup. After failing to reach first-grade for the Tigers, Ndaira again signed with Kurri Kurri for the 2012 season, as the captain-coach.

In 2015, Ndaira was an assistant coach for the Newcastle Knights NSW Cup side. During the season, he was asked to come out of retirement by head coach Matt Lantry, after the side suffered a number of injuries. He subsequently went on to play in the Knights' 2015 New South Wales Cup Grand Final win over the Wyong Roos.

=== Representative career ===
Ndaira played for Lebanon in the 2008 Rugby League World Cup qualifiers however Lebanon drew with Ireland and did not qualify. George's moved from his usual position of Hooker to Half back whilst playing in the Qualifiers and earned two Man of the Match performances against Wales & Ireland before his side bowed out against Samoa.

== Career highlights ==
- Junior Club: Arncliffe Scots
- Round 3, 2008: Ndaira scored his first points in first grade (kicking a goal)

== Coaching career ==
Ndaira captain-coached the Kurri-Kurri Bulldogs, who played in the local Newcastle Rugby League competition. He began this role in 2012 and lasted for two years.

In 2014, Ndaira became an assistant coach for the Newcastle Knights NSW Cup team. He remained there until the end of 2016. In 2017, he joined the Newtown Jets as their assistant coach, and stayed there until the end of 2021.

In 2022, he became the coach for the Cronulla Sutherland Sharks Jersey Flegg Cup (under 21's) team.

In 2023, he was appointed the head coach of the Newtown Jets rugby league team following the resignation of Greg Matterson On 29 September 2024, Ndaira coached Newtown in their 2024 NSW Cup Grand Final victory over North Sydney.
