= Ignatius O'Connor =

Brother Ignatius O'Connor FMS (16 July 1896 – 19 March 1949), was the religious name of Vincent Ignatius O'Connor, an Australian Marist Brother who worked in Sydney and Queensland. He was the founding headmaster of the Catholic boys' school Marist College Ashgrove in 1940, having previously been headmaster at Marcellin College Randwick.

Born in Sydney, Vincent Ignatius O'Connor was educated at the Marist Brothers' Juniorate at Hunters Hill, and began his novitiate in 1914. Brother Ignatius was on staff at St. Joseph's College, Hunters Hill from 1926 to 1931, and obtained degrees in Arts and Economics at the University of Sydney. Appointed as director of the Brothers' college at Randwick from 1932 to 1937, he achieved remarkable success in expanding the school through significant building projects during these depression years, attracting support ranging from the local community level to members of parliament and the Governor of New South Wales, Sir Philip Game.

After visiting Europe in 1939, Brother Ignatius continued his work in 1940 as the founding director of the Brothers' new college at Ashgrove in Brisbane, on the site of the former St Jude’s Seminary. The clearing of the recreation ground and sports oval and construction of the school's swimming pool was completed under his leadership in the first year. However, the college was only open for two years before the grounds were commandeered by the Australian Army in 1942. The boarding students were evacuated to Eagle Heights on Tamborine Mountain, where several guest houses were rented for accommodation and a building was purchased for the new school.

Brother Ignatius suffered a stroke in 1944, which undermined his health and left him bed-ridden for the remainder of his life. He did not return with the senior students in 1945, after the military occupation of the college at Ashgrove had ended, but remained with the Marist community at Eagle Heights until his death, at the age of 52, in 1949. Archbishop James Duhig presided over the requiem and his burial at Eagle Heights, which was attended by many friends, including the Premier of Queensland, Ned Hanlon.

In honour of his work in the founding of the college at Ashgrove, one of the eight houses of the secondary school was named in his memory when the house system began in 1993.
