= Mike Bailey (weatherman) =

Australian television presenter (1949–2021)

Mike Bailey OAM
- Born: Michael John Bailey; 27 October 1949; Sefton, New South Wales, Australia
- Died: 20 June 2021 (aged 71); Sydney, New South Wales, Australia
- Occupations: Television presenter; Radio presenter; Journalism educator; Lecturer; Political aspirant; Football cub president
- Years active: 1968–2021
- Employers: ABC; Seven Network; Nine Network
- Organisation: Wests Tigers
- Television: ABC News; Seven News
- Spouse: Helena Bailey (m. 1986)
- Children: 1

Michael John Bailey OAM (27 October 1949 – 20 June 2021) was an Australian television and radio weather presenter, journalism educator, political aspirant and football club chairman.

== Early life ==
Bailey was raised in the Sydney suburb of Sefton and educated at De La Salle College, Bankstown (1959–1965) and later De La Salle College, Ashfield (1966–1967).

== Television and radio career ==
He was the longtime presenter of the weekday weather segment of the ABC Sydney edition of the 7:00 p.m. news bulletin, which is also relayed to major parts of New South Wales. He also spent 13 years presenting the weather and, on occasions, the news for Sydney's Channel 7. Bailey was also a lecturer in radio journalism at Macleay College in Sydney, and a noted MC and guest speaker.

Before entering politics, Bailey discussed the weather on weekday afternoons with Richard Glover on ABC Radio Sydney 702. He mentioned that one of his jobs as a young man was "Savings Sam", spruiking, among other things, ladies' underwear outside a Sydney department store.

== Political candidate ==
On 22 May 2007, it was announced that Bailey had been approached to stand for Australian Labor Party preselection for the seat of North Sydney to challenge the sitting member, Joe Hockey, Minister for Employment and Workplace Relations, in the upcoming Australian federal election. He subsequently resigned from the ABC. Bailey received an 8.4 percent primary and 4.7 percent two-party swing, but fell significantly short.

== Later career ==
Bailey later presented the weather for Nine News Sydney on Fridays and Saturdays and Nine News Afternoon Edition weather on Fridays. When he went on holiday in early 2009, he was told not to return. Having been a lifelong supporter of the Western Suburbs Magpies, Bailey became the Chairman of the Wests Tigers NRL Club (Wests Ashfield Leagues) in 2011, as appointed by the Wests Group stakeholders in the joint venture club.

== Personal life and death ==
Bailey was married from 1986 to his death to Helena Bailey, a former television presenter between 1978 and 1987 of the localised version of children's television program Romper Room, where she was billed as 'Miss Helena'. They had one son, Michael.

Bailey died on 20 June 2021, aged 71, from a stroke after three weeks in a coma.
