= Othmar Weldon =

Brother Othmar Weldon MBE (20 Sept 1920 – 2 June 2008) was the religious name of William George Weldon, an Australian Marist Brother who was from 1964 to 1972 the provincial head of the Marist order in Sydney. He had a prominent role in the expansion of Catholic education in eastern Australia and the Solomon Islands in the 1960s and 70s.

== Early life and teaching career ==
Weldon was born on September 29, 1920, to Myrtle and Stephen Weldon in Yackandandah in the north-eastern area of Victoria. He was educated by the Our Lady of Sion Sisters at Box Hill and then by the Marist Brothers at St Patrick’s College, Sale. He began his novitiate in 1939.

He was on staff at the Marist Brothers school in Lidcombe and then at St Joseph's College, Hunters Hill from 1941 to 1951. He was headmaster at Joeys from 1955 till the end of 1961 having earlier been headmaster at Marist Brothers Kogarah from 1952 to 1954. From 1962 to 1964 he was Headmaster at the Marist College Ashgrove.

As Headmaster at Joeys, Brother Othmar effected a substantial building program still at a time before there was government funding for Catholic schools. Apart from the Chapel in 1939, there had been no construction of new classrooms, laboratories, dormitories or any essential building since the main college building had been completed in 1894. His major works as Headmaster were an olympic pool in the college grounds and the Pius X Building, a substantial complex of classrooms, laboratories, workshop rooms and squash courts, blessed by Cardinal Gilroy and opened by the Rt Hon.Robert Menzies on 16 July 1961. He also initiated the early planning of the college’s response to the Wyndham Scheme, resulting in new residential blocks for the two senior years, completed under Br Elias in 1967.

During the opening of the Pius X Building, Prime Minister Menzies expressed a wish to return to the college to talk further with Brother Othmar. He came one evening some weeks later. After a further tour, they talked at length in the new chemistry laboratory, Brother Othmar standing at the demonstration bench and Prime Minister Menzies sitting at one of the student desks. Menzies sought Othmar's views on how the Federal Government could assist private schools within the framework of the Australian Constitution. Partly from that discussion, the Federal Government School Building Assistance Program was developed, a landmark change in education funding. The program was implemented through the States Grants (Science Laboratories and Technical Training) Act 1964. This proved to be the first of many programs of federal support for independent schools.

== Provincial and education leadership ==
In 1964 he was appointed Provincial of the Sydney Province of the Marist Brothers. He was to serve in this position for eight years, dealing with the changes in the Church following the Second Vatican Council and a General Chapter of the Marist Brothers. As Provincial, Othmar took decisions leading to school openings in Grafton (1965), Gladstone (1965), Canberra (1968), Enoggera (1970), Kolombangara (Western Solomons) (1971), Rokera (Solomon Islands) (1971) and the Pacific Novitiate in Lomeri in Fiji (1971). Many other schools were refurbished and expanded.

His educational leadership was recognised by Cardinal Gilroy with an appointment to the Catholic Building and Finance Commission in the late 1960s. In the early days of government funding and the development of the system of parish and regional schools, it was the body responsible for the significant expansion of Catholic education in Sydney.

== Later life ==
In 1988, Brother Othmar returned to South Africa as vocations recruiter. After eight years, which spanned both the apartheid era and some of the Mandela years, he returned to Daceyville, where he took up part-time duties with the Catholic Education Office Eastern Region.

In 1999 he celebrated his Diamond Jubilee with a function attended by former Prime Minister Gough Whitlam and a number of other former ministers, both state and federal.

In 2006, he moved to Randwick to become part of the Marcellin House Community. He died on 2 June 2008 after a short stay at St Vincent’s Hospital.
