= Tom Bellew =

Australian rugby league administrator

Thomas Joseph Bellew (30 January 1922 – 26 June 2001) was an Australian rugby league administrator. He was educated at Marcellin College Randwick, and was Dux of the college in 1938. Having had a long career as a grade referee, he became the Code's pre-eminent expert on the rules before serving as a Vice President of the New South Wales Rugby League from 1974 to 1983. He was elected chairman of the board of directors in 1983 and remained in that position until 1986. He was also a long-serving director of the Australian Rugby League from 1983 to 1997. In 1986 he was awarded the Medal of the Order of Australia in recognition of service to the sport and for public service. He was also the chairman of the Gold Coast Chargers from 1996 to 1998 and the inaugural chairman of the Metropolitan Cup. His youngest son, Geoffrey Bellew, is a retired Justice of the Supreme Court of NSW
