= Greg Foran =

New Zealand businessman (born 1961)

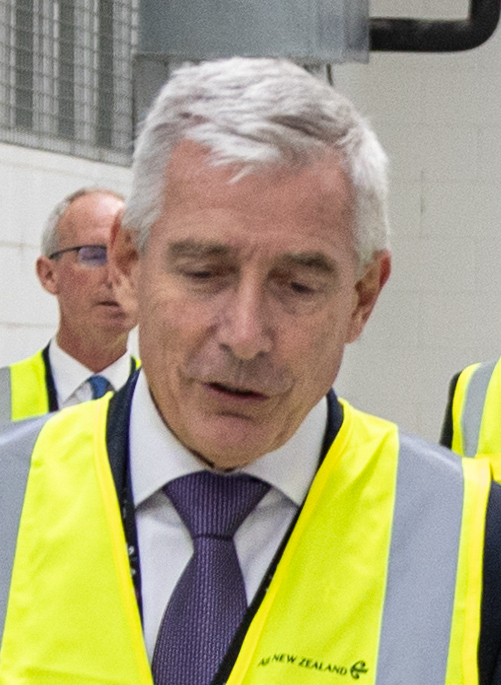
- Foran in 2022

CEO of Kroger
- Incumbent
- Assumed office 9 February 2026
- Preceded by: Ron Sargent

CEO of Air New Zealand
- In office February 2020 – 20 October 2025
- Preceded by: Christopher Luxon
- Succeeded by: Nikhil Ravishankar

President and CEO of Walmart U.S.
- In office August 2014 – November 2019
- Preceded by: Bill Simon
- Succeeded by: John Furner

President and CEO of Walmart Asia
- In office May 2014 – August 2014
- Preceded by: Scott Price
- Succeeded by: Scott Price

President and CEO of Walmart China
- In office March 2012 – May 2014
- Preceded by: Ed Chan
- Succeeded by: Sean Clarke

Personal details
- Born: Gregory Stephen Foran; 22 July 1961 (age 65) New Zealand
- Children: 4, including Kieran and Liam

Gregory Stephen Foran (born 22 July 1961) is a New Zealand businessman who has served as the chief executive officer of Kroger since February 2026. He was previously the president and CEO of the American division of Walmart, and was the chief executive officer of Air New Zealand from 2020 to 2025.

== Early life and education ==
Foran was born on 22 July 1961 in New Zealand to two school teachers. He grew up in Hastings and Hamilton. He attended Twyford School and St John's College in Hastings, St John's College in Hamilton, and Hillcrest High School in Hamilton. He did not attend university.

== Career ==
=== Woolworths ===
Foran's first job was a shelf stacker at a supermarket in Hamilton. At age 20 he became a Woolworths manager, and by age 48 he almost became the CEO of Woolworths Australia but was unsuccessful.

=== Walmart ===
Foran began working for the American retail company Walmart in 2011. He became president and chief executive of Walmart China in March 2012. In 2014, Foran was promoted to president and CEO of Walmart Asia and in the same year transitioned to president and CEO of Walmart U.S. During this period he lived in Fayetteville, Arkansas. Foran would occasionally shop in Walmart undercover in order to better understand the experiences of customers and employees. According to Reuters, Foran is "credited with turning around Walmart's U.S. business by focusing on improving existing stores". Foran raised Walmart's minimum gun-purchasing age to 21.

=== Air New Zealand ===
Foran became the CEO of Air New Zealand in February 2020, near the beginning of the COVID-19 pandemic. As the new CEO, he proposed to hold a 100-day review of the business, which included asking employees and customers how the business could improve, and personally serving beverages to customers and cleaning aeroplanes. The COVID-19 pandemic prevented the completion of the review; he had instead begun leading in "crisis management mode", announcing at one point that the company was expecting a 90% reduction in revenue. In March 2025, Foran announced that he had resigned and would leave the company on 20 October. On 20 October 2025, Foran was succeeded by Nikhil Ravishankar, the airline's former Chief Digital Officer.

=== Kroger ===
On 9 February 2026, Foran was appointed chief executive officer of the American retail company Kroger, succeeding Ron Sargent, who served as interim CEO since March 2025.

== Personal life ==
Foran has three sons and one daughter. His sons, Kieran Foran and Liam Foran, were both professional rugby league players.

In 2023, Foran was jokingly floated by The Spinoff as a potential future Leader of the New Zealand Labour Party, a reference to his predecessor, current National Party leader and Prime Minister Christopher Luxon.

Business positions
Preceded by Christopher Luxon	Chief executive officer of Air New Zealand; 2020–2025	Succeeded by Nikhil Ravishankar
Preceded by Ron Sargent	Chief executive officer of Kroger; 2026–present	Incumbent
