= Kieran Foran =

New Zealand international rugby league footballer (born 1990)

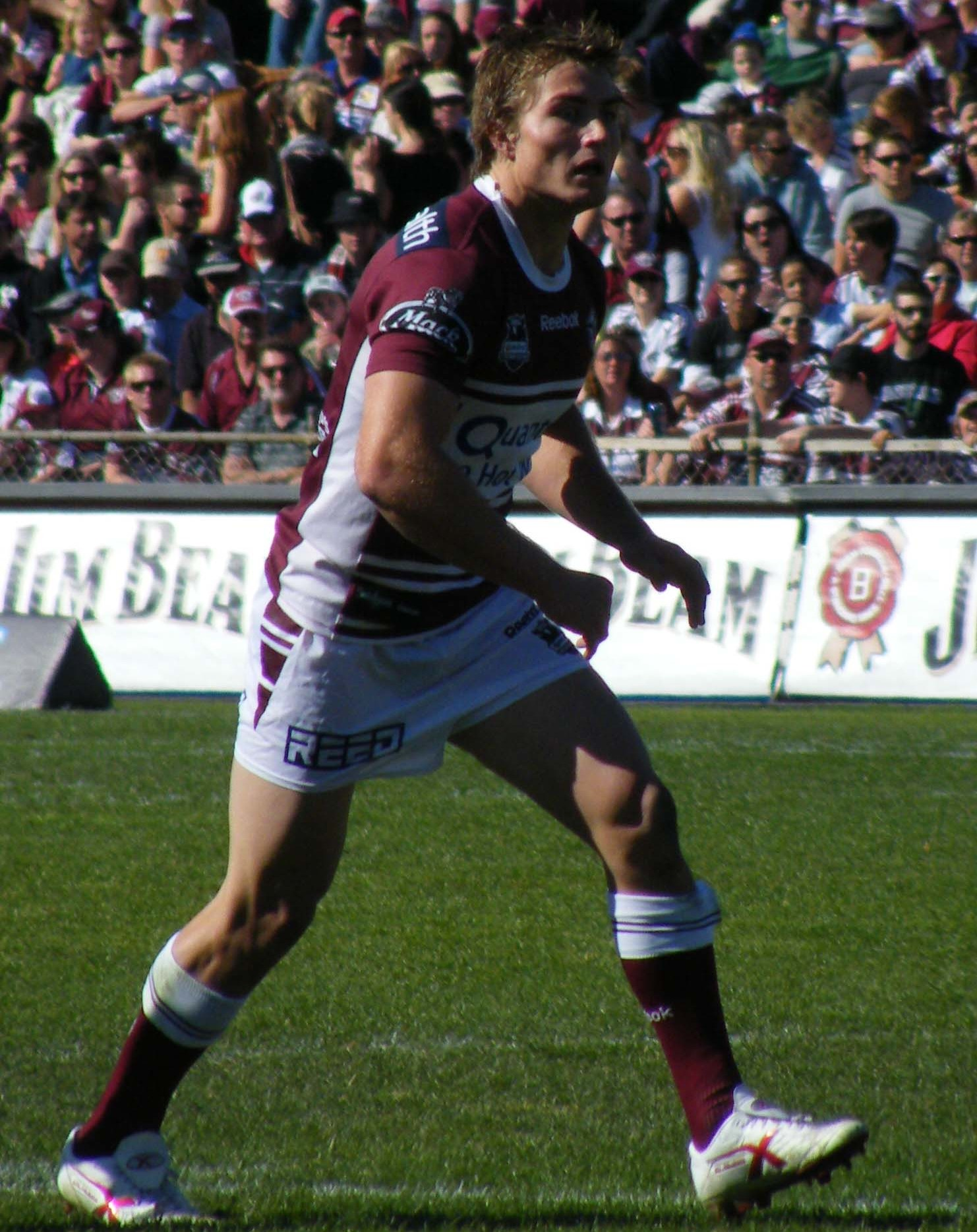

Personal information
- Born: 13 July 1990 (age 36) Auckland, New Zealand

Playing information
- Height: 180 cm (5 ft 11 in)
- Weight: 90 kg (14 st 2 lb)
- Position: Five-eighth, Halfback
Club
Years	Team	Pld	T	G	FG	P
2009–15	Manly Sea Eagles	147	34	4	0	144
2016	Parramatta Eels	9	1	0	0	4
2017	New Zealand Warriors	17	2	0	0	8
2018–20	Canterbury Bulldogs	40	8	4	1	41
2021–22	Manly Sea Eagles	49	6	0	0	24
2023–25	Gold Coast Titans	56	9	0	1	37
	Total	318	60	8	2	258
Representative
Years	Team	Pld	T	G	FG	P
2009–25	New Zealand	34	1	6	0	16
2013–15	NRL All Stars	2	0	0	0	0

Coaching information
Club
Years	Team	Gms	W	D	L	W%
2026–	Manly Sea Eagles	17	9	0	8	53
- Education: Marist Catholic College North Shore
- Father: Greg Foran
- Relatives: Liam Foran (brother)

Kieran Foran (born 13 July 1990) is a New Zealand professional rugby league coach who is the head coach of the Manly Warringah Sea Eagles in the National Rugby League and a former professional rugby league footballer.

As a player he won the 2011 NRL premiership with the Manly Sea Eagles. He primarily played as a five-eighth but also spent time at halfback. At international level, he represented New Zealand, with whom he won the 2014 Four Nations and 2023 Rugby League Pacific Cup, the latter while playing hooker.

Foran last played for the Gold Coast Titans, where he was acting captain in 2024. He also played for the Parramatta Eels, who he co-captained, the New Zealand Warriors, the Canterbury-Bankstown Bulldogs, and the NRL All Stars.

== Early life ==
Foran was born in Auckland, New Zealand, and went to Ellerslie Primary School and played for the Ellerslie Eagles before his family moved to Australia. Foran attended St Ives North Primary School and then went on to attend Marist Catholic College North Shore, along with close friend and future Sydney Roosters player Mitchell Pearce. His father is Greg Foran, the former CEO of Walmart's US division and the former chief executive of Air New Zealand, current CEO of Kroger and his brother is former Manly Sea Eagles five eighth Liam Foran.

== Playing career ==
=== Junior football ===
Foran played his junior football for the Ellerslie Eagles in the Auckland Rugby League and several Norths Juniors district clubs; the Asquith Magpies and the North Sydney Brothers. Foran is the younger brother of Liam Foran. In 2007, Foran represented the Australia Schoolboy rugby league team. Foran played in the North Sydney Bears Harold Matthews Cup and SG Ball teams before being signed by the Manly club. Foran played in the Sea Eagles NYC team in 2008 and 2009 playing 34 games, scoring 20 tries for 80 points in his U20s career from 2008 to 2009.

=== 2009 ===
In early 2009, Foran was promoted to Manly's full-time squad and toured England with their World Club Challenge team. Foran became Sea Eagle number 526 when he made his first grade debut in round 15 against the Canberra Raiders, starting at five-eighth and scoring a try in Manly's 20–14 win at Brookvale Oval. On 6 August 2009, Foran was named in the 45-man New Zealand national rugby league team training squad for the 2009 Rugby League Four Nations. On 26 August, Foran publicly declared that he would represent New Zealand, making himself ineligible for Australia and New South Wales. Foran finished his debut year in the NRL with him playing in 9 matches and scoring 6 tries for Manly-Warringah in the 2009 NRL season. On 2 September 2009, Foran was named on the interchange bench in the 2009 NYC team of the year. On 7 November 2009, Foran become Kiwi number 757 when he made his test debut, playing in the centres in New Zealand's 12–20 loss to England at Alfred McAlpine Stadium. This was Foran's only match in the 2009 Four Nations tournament.

=== 2010 ===
Following Matt Orford's departure before the start of the 2010 Season, Foran started at halfback in Manly's round 1 22–26 loss to the Wests Tigers at ANZ Stadium. The following week, he played at five-eighth in Manly's 20–24 loss to Parramatta.

After a strong start to the season, Foran was rewarded with selection as halfback for New Zealand in the 2010 Anzac Test, which was played at Melbourne's new AAMI Park. Despite the 8–12 loss, Foran produced a strong performance and was heavily considered as New Zealand's halfback for the 2010 Four Nations. However, Foran picked up a shoulder injury near the end of the NRL season which required him to have surgery and ruled him out for the entire tournament. During the season, Foran played in 23 matches and scored 4 tries for the Manly club.

=== 2011 ===
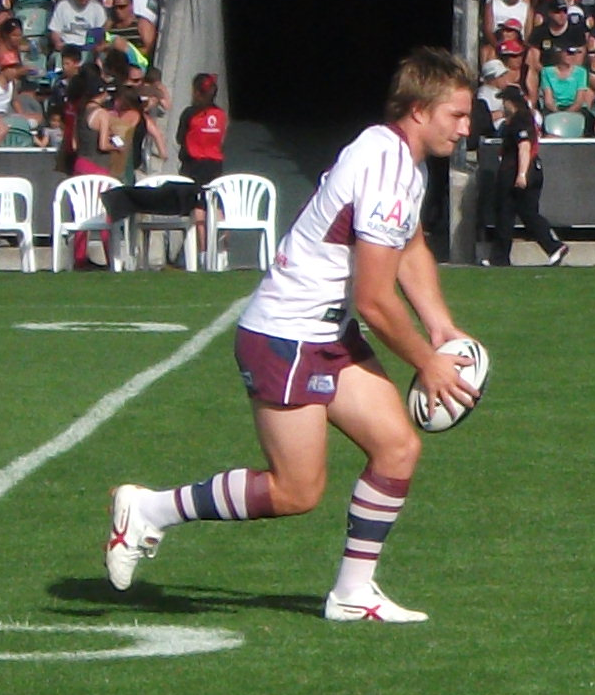
Foran playing for Manly in 2011

Following the early rounds of the 2011 NRL season, Foran was rewarded with selection at halfback inside of Benji Marshall at five-eighth for the annual Anzac test match against Australia at the Gold Coast's Cbus Super Stadium. In the game, he set up the final try of the game to team-mate Lance Hohaia, however Australia won the game 20–10. Heading into round 17 of the season, Foran was trailing North Queensland Cowboys captain Johnathan Thurston by six votes when voting for the Dally M Medal went behind closed doors. But soon after, Thurston suffered a knee injury in the third State of Origin game and during his absence Foran produced some man-of-the-match awards to seemingly catch up. Foran was suspended following his role in the brawl against Melbourne in round 25 in Manly's 18–4 win at Brookvale Oval, ruling him ineligible for that year's medal.

After Foran's one match suspension, he helped taking Manly to the 2011 NRL grand final. On 2 October 2011, Foran played five-eighth in the Sea Eagles' 24–10 win over the New Zealand Warriors in the grand final in front of 81,988 at the ANZ Stadium in Sydney. Kieran was unlucky not to be among Manly's try scorers on the day after he knocked on while scoring a try. Foran finished the Sea Eagles successful season with him playing in 26 matches and scoring 8 tries. After the 2011 grand final victory, Foran was selected in the New Zealand Kiwis' squad for the trans-Tasman test game against Australia and the 2011 Four Nations tournament. Team-mate, halves-partner, and Kiwis captain, Benji Marshall, also tipped Foran to be a key figure for the Kiwis' Four Nations campaign. Foran featured in the trans-Tasman test against Australia in the Kiwis 42–6 loss, and every game of the Kiwis' regular Four Nations tournament rounds, where the Kiwis were knocked out of the tournament by England in the final round losing 28–6 at KC Stadium.

=== 2012 ===
Foran travelled to England with the Manly club for the 2012 World Club Challenge match against 2011 Super League Champions Leeds Rhinos, Foran played at five-eighth in the 26–12 loss at Headingley Stadium.

Early in the 2012 NRL season, following the departure of Manly's 2008 and 2011 premiership-winning coach Des Hasler to the Canterbury Bulldogs, Foran activated a get-out clause in his current Manly contract and was offered a three-year deal by the Canterbury club worth $650,000 per season.

However, on 29 April 2012, Foran re-signed with Manly until the end of 2015, ending speculations about his future. For his part, Foran admitted after re-signing with Manly that he had dinner with Hasler and his family to personally inform his old coach and mentor of his decision to stay with the reigning NRL premiers. Foran was ruled-out of the Kiwis' 2012 Anzac Test game clash against Australia, due to a hamstring injury.

During week 2 of the 2012 NRL Finals Series in which Manly played the North Queensland Cowboys, Foran was involved in a try scored by Michael Oldfield. After a Daly Cherry-Evans bomb in the 62nd minute, some, including Cowboys five-eighth and captain Johnathan Thurston, claimed that Foran had knocked the ball forward, which ultimately led to a try being awarded by video referees Steve Clark and Paul Simpkins as 'benefit of the doubt'. Thurston was later quoted as telling referee Shayne Hayne that, "(the Cowboys) had been robbed twice," the first time being the 52nd minute try to Jorge Taufua. During the whole ordeal, Foran maintained that he had not made contact with the ball during Manly's 22–12 win.

Foran finished the season with him playing in 21 matches and scoring 4 tries for Manly.

On 13 October 2012, Foran was selected to play halfback for the Kiwis against the Australian Kangaroos in the post-season trans-Tasman test in which the Kiwis lost 18–10 at 1300SMILES Stadium.

=== 2013 ===
On 13 February 2013, Foran was chosen to play for the NRL All Stars team off the interchange bench in the 6–32 loss to the Indigenous All Stars at Suncorp Stadium.

In round 1, Foran started the 2013 NRL season with a man-of-the-match strong performance in Manly's 22–14 win over the Brisbane Broncos at Suncorp Stadium. Foran then continued his great form by producing a number of strong performances and great plays, leading-up to the 2013 Anzac Test game. On 19 April 2013, Foran was selected to play five-eighth for New Zealand in the 2013 Anzac Test against Australia at Canberra Stadium.

Hours before the test game, New Zealand captain Simon Mannering was ruled out of the game with a calf injury and Foran was then named as the New Zealand captain for the game, which resulted earning his first captaincy title for New Zealand. In round 24 against the Canberra Raiders, Foran played his 100th career match in Manly-Warringah's 36–22 win at Canberra Stadium.

Foran went on to help guide Manly to the grand final. On 6 October 2013, Foran played five-eighth in the 2013 NRL Grand Final against the Sydney Roosters, however the Roosters won the game 26–18, and the NRL Premiership Title. Foran played in 27 matches and scored 2 tries for Manly in the 2013 NRL season.

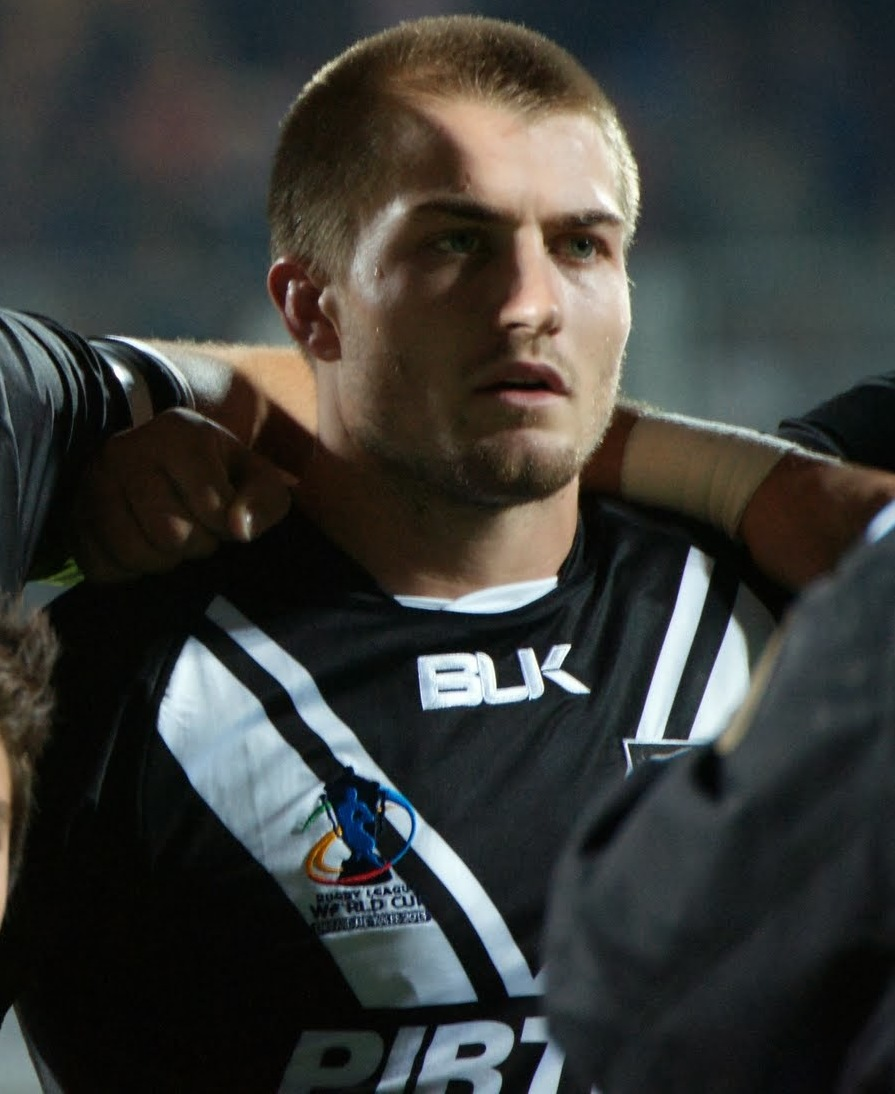
Foran during 2013 World Cup

Following the NRL grand final, Foran was named in the New Zealand Kiwis World Cup squad. Coach Stephen Kearney had originally planned to rest Foran, along with the Sydney Roosters' players, for the team's World Cup warm-up game against the Cook Islands as they had all played in the NRL Grand Final.

However Foran was called into action at five-eighth for the game following a hamstring injury to Thomas Leuluai. Foran was selected for the Kiwis' first World Cup game, against Samoa, playing at five-eighth in the Kiwis' 42–24 win at Halliwell Jones Stadium. The following week, he played in the Kiwis' 48–0 win over France at Parc des Sports (Avignon).

On 7 November 2013, New Zealand coach Stephen Kearney rested regular captain Simon Mannering and selected Foran to captain New Zealand for the Group B World Cup game clash against Papua New Guinea. The game saw Foran captaining New Zealand for the second time in his career. The Kiwis beat PNG in that game 56–10, giving Foran his first win as Kiwis captain. In the World Cup knockout finals, Foran featured in the Kiwis' quarter-final 40–4 win over Scotland, and the semi-final 20–18 win over England, which took the Kiwis to the World Cup final for a re-match of the 2008 World Cup final against Australia.

Unlike the 2008 final, where New Zealand won their first ever World Cup by defeating Australia 34–20 at Suncorp Stadium in Brisbane, Australia won the 2014 final 34–2, in front of a world record international rugby league crowd of 74,468 at the Old Trafford stadium in Manchester. Following the World Cup, Foran won the Steve Watene Memorial medal on 9 December 2013, becoming only the second recipient after Jeremy Smith to win this award. Foran was also named as the New Zealand Kiwis 2013 player of the year.

=== 2014 ===
Following the Manly's 26–21 win over the North Queensland Cowboys in round 7 at Central Coast Stadium, Foran picked up a knee injury which ruled him out of the Kiwis' trans-Tasman Anzac Test match and was expected to sidelined him until round 12.

Foran returned from his knee injury in Manly's 36–10 loss to the Brisbane Broncos at Suncorp Stadium in round 12. During the game, he scored a try in the first half. Foran finished off the 2014 NRL season with him playing in 22 matches and scoring 6 tries for the Manly club. Following the end of the season, Foran was selected in New Zealand's 2014 Four Nations squad.

On 25 October 2014, Foran played in the Four Nations tournament round 1 opener at Suncorp Stadium, Foran produced a strong performance; as he, along with his halves-partner Shaun Johnson, guided the Kiwis to a 30–12 win over Australia, as well as guiding the team to their first win over Australia since the 2010 Four Nations final.

The following week he was again selected to play at five-eighth, against Samoa at Whangārei's Toll Stadium, meaning that this game was Foran's first test game in New Zealand. During the match against Samoa, he produced a strong man-of-the-match performance; scoring a try (in the 1st half of the game) and making 22 tackles, 6 runs for 58 metres, 2 off-loads, 2 line-break assist, 1 line-break, 2 try-saving tackles and 6 kicks in-play, in the Kiwis' 14–12 home-game win.

On 8 November, Foran again featured at five-eighth, helping to guide the Kiwis to a 16–14 win over England at Dunedin's Forsyth Barr Stadium and guiding the team to the Four Nations grand final.

On 15 November, Foran played at five-eighth in the Four Nations tournament's grand final clash against Australia at Wellington's Westpac Stadium, producing a strong performance making 22 tackles, 6 runs for 60 metres, 1 line-break, 2 line-break assists, 2 off-loads, 1 try-assist (to Manu Vatuvei in the second half of the game) and 2 try-saving tackles. He proved a solid foil for halfback Shaun Johnson to work off and steadied the Kiwi-team ship on more than one occasion and backed it up with a good defensive game; which also helped the Kiwis to win the 2014 Rugby League Four Nations title, as well as extending the team's winning run to 3 consecutive wins on home soil, guiding the team to their first home-game win over Australia in New Zealand since 2003 and guiding the team to 2 consecutive test-games wins over Australia since 1953. New Zealand won the final 22–18.

=== 2015 ===
On 23 January 2015, Foran was named in the Sea Eagles 2015 NRL Auckland Nines squad. On 13 February 2015, Foran was selected at five-eighth for the NRL All Stars in the 2015 All Stars match at Cbus Super Stadium. The NRL All Stars lost 20–6.

On 16 March 2015, Foran ended weeks of speculation over his future by informing teammates he was joining the Parramatta Eels from 2016, Foran who was off contract at the end of the 2015 season was understood to have agreed a four-year deal worth $AUD4.8 million with Parramatta from 2016. For the 2015 Anzac Test, against Australia at Suncorp Stadium, Foran played at five-eighth and assisted the Kiwis to a 26–12 victory, resulting in the Kiwis defeating the Kangaroos 3 times in a row, the first time since 1953.

On 3 July 2015, Foran officially signed a two-year contract with the Parramatta Eels, with an option for an additional two years, starting in 2016. At the time of his signature, Parramatta legend Peter Sterling said that Foran's signing was the "most important signing" in the club's history.

Manly finished the 2015 NRL season in 9th position, missing out on the Finals for the first time since the 2004 NRL season. Foran finished his last year with Manly-Warringah Sea Eagles with him playing in 19 matches, scoring 4 tries and kicking 4 goals. On 8 September 2015, Foran was named in the New Zealand Kiwis' training squad for their tour of Great Britain. Foran later pulled out of the squad due to injury.

=== 2016 ===
Foran was named team captain of the Parramatta Eels, alongside club captain Tim Mannah. After Foran missed the season opening match due to injury, he made his club debut for the Eels in round 2 against the North Queensland Cowboys, where he played at halfback in the 20–16 win at Parramatta Stadium.

In round 4 against the Wests Tigers, Foran played his 150th NRL career match in the Eels 8–0 win at ANZ Stadium. In round 6, against the Canberra Raiders, Foran scored his first club try for the Eels in the 36–6 win at Parramatta Stadium.

On 28 April 2016, Foran was rushed to hospital in an ambulance after he overdosed on prescription medication and he was subsequently granted indefinite leave. On 29 April 2016, reports came out that Foran had been struggling because of the pressure of football, a relationship breakdown with his partner who recently gave birth to their second child, a third-party sponsorship dispute with former club Manly who allegedly owe him $140,000 and the prospect of Parramatta losing competition points from the club's salary cap scandal.

On 6 May 2016, Foran launched legal action against KIIS 106.5 Radio host Jackie O after she made degrading comments about Foran and his ex-partner Rebecca Pope about the paternity of the couple's second child. Jackie O later apologized to Foran and Pope, commenting "I just want to take this time to personally apologise to Rebecca and Kieran for what I said. I can imagine how hurtful that would have been and I feel really terrible, I really do, and I'm truly sorry".

On 21 May 2016, Foran was again in the spotlight after reports he lost $75,000 on his TAB account on a gambling binge. Reports claimed that Foran bet money on greyhounds and horse racing in South Africa. In one wager he allegedly placed a $20,000 bet on a horse that came last. Just prior to this gambling binge, Foran had returned to Sydney from a three-day stint at a Queensland rehabilitation centre. On 24 May 2016, Foran was reportedly planning to sue the TAB over his leaked betting details seeking a $150,000 payout from the betting agency.

In round 12, against the Newcastle Knights, Foran suffered a season-ending shoulder injury in the Eels 20–18 win at Hunter Stadium. On 28 June 2016, Foran was stripped of his captaincy and fined $5,000 for unprofessional conduct by the Eels after he did not turn up to a rehabilitation session and drank alcohol while being injured.

In June 2016, Foran declared that due to his personal issues there would be a possibility that he would never play rugby league again.

On 29 July 2016, it was announced that Foran had been released from his contract with Parramatta to sort out his personal issues. Foran finished the 2016 NRL season having played in 9 matches and scoring a solitary try for the Parramatta Eels.

On 22 September 2016, Foran signed a one-year deal with the New Zealand Warriors for the 2017 season.

=== 2017 ===
Foran made his debut for the New Zealand Warriors in round 5 against the Gold Coast Titans. A great debut it was, with the five-eight scoring a try and his team getting a much-needed win 28–22.

The following week, Round 6, was one well publicised by the media. Foran, played against his old side Parramatta Eels, where his life unravelled. First, Foran lead a pass to Simon Mannering to score, then he proved the difference with a clutch play down a short-side, breaking tackles and putting Muamalo in for the crucial try.

On 10 May 2017, the Canterbury-Bankstown Bulldogs signed New Zealand five-eighth Kieran Foran on a three-year deal that would keep him at Belmore until the end of the 2020 NRL season.

Canterbury Chief Executive Raelene Castle was delighted to have secured the signature of the highly talented Foran: "We are delighted to have secured the services of Kieran for the next three seasons. He is a highly experienced and talented play-maker who will be a great asset to our team. We look forward to Kieran joining up with us leading into next year's campaign."

When asked about the deal Des Hasler said, "I know that family was a determining priority in Kieran's decision. He could have chosen to go to a handful of Sydney clubs, so we are pleased that he has chosen to continue his career at the Bulldogs."

Foran spoke to the media about his future being decided:

"It's been weighing on my mind the last couple of weeks," Foran said.

"It's always hard when you are weighing up where your future [lies], it does weigh on your mind and it can become a bit of a distraction.

"I have certainly noticed it's been that way for me the last couple of weeks, so it will be good to put that behind me.

"I probably haven't played too poor the last couple of weeks [but] I certainly don't think I have been at my best."

=== 2018 ===
In round 1 of the 2018 NRL season, he made his club debut for the Canterbury-Bankstown Bulldogs against Melbourne Storm, start at five eighth 36–18 loss at Perth Stadium. In round 5 against the Canberra Raiders, Foran scored his first club try for the Bulldogs in the 26–10 loss at Canberra Stadium. On 25 June, Foran was ruled out for the rest of the 2018 season with a toe injury. There were earlier reports that Canterbury were trying to medically retire Foran in an effort to free up salary cap space but instead decided to keep Foran at the club for 2019 and beyond.

=== 2019 ===
In round 3, Foran guided Canterbury to an upset victory over Wests Tigers at Campbelltown Stadium. After the match, it was revealed that Foran had suffered a serious ankle injury. Canterbury released a statement saying "Bulldogs playmaker Kieran Foran is to undergo surgery for a high ankle sprain, meaning he is likely to miss 10 to 12 weeks".

Foran made a total of 14 appearances for Canterbury in the 2019 NRL season as the club finished 12th on the table and missed out on the finals.

=== 2020 ===
In February, it was revealed that Foran would miss the majority of the 2020 NRL season with a shoulder injury, however, he was able to recover in time for round 4 of the competition after the extended break due to COVID-19. He was named in the Canterbury team to play against St. George Illawarra for his 200th NRL match.

In round 17, Foran scored a try but was later taken from the field after suffering a torn pectoral injury in Canterbury's 18–14 loss to the Gold Coast at ANZ Stadium which left the club bottom of the table.

On 22 September, Foran was told by Canterbury that his services would not be required for the 2021 season and he was to be released by the club. Foran was one of eight players who were told that they would be released as part of a major cleanout at Canterbury as the club looked to rebuild for the 2021 season.

On 28 September, the Manly-Warringah Sea Eagles confirmed that Foran would return to the club for the 2021 NRL season.

=== 2021 ===
In round 10 of the 2021 NRL season, Foran was taken from the field with a suspected broken hand in Manly's 50–6 victory over Brisbane.

In Round 17, Foran was named the team's captain, the 65th in the club's history, due to the absence of Daly Cherry-Evans, who was in preparations for his State of Origin series duties. Foran played 25 games for Manly in the 2021 NRL season including the club's preliminary final loss against South Sydney.

=== 2022 ===
On 7 May, Foran signed a two-year deal with the Gold Coast Titans for the 2023 and 2024 seasons. Foran played a total of 24 games for Manly in the 2022 NRL season as the club finished 11th on the table missing the finals.

=== 2023 ===
In round 10 of the 2023 NRL season, Foran scored two tries for the Gold Coast in their 26–24 victory over Parramatta. In round 27, Foran scored a hat-trick in the Gold Coast's 34–30 victory over Canterbury. Foran played a total of 20 matches for the Gold Coast in the 2023 NRL season as the club finished 14th on the table.

=== 2024 ===
In round 3 of the 2024 NRL season, Foran made his start of the year with the Gold Coast in their 32–0 loss against Canterbury. In round 5, Foran was taken from the field with an ankle injury and ruled out indefinitely from playing but was then later named in the Gold Coast team for their round 6 game against Canberra. On 10 July 2024, Foran re-signed with the Gold Coast on a one-year extension. In round 21, Foran kicked a field goal during the Gold Coast's comeback victory over the Dolphins. In round 24, Foran played his 300th first grade game in the Gold Coast's loss against St. George Illawarra at WIN Stadium. Foran made 21 appearances for the Gold Coast throughout the 2024 NRL season as the club finished 14th on the table.

=== 2025 ===
On 24 February, it was announced that Foran would miss at least twelve weeks with a biceps injury he sustained during the Gold Coast's trial game against the Dolphins. On 11 July, Foran announced his retirement from the NRL after 17 years of playing. In Foran's final game of his playing career in round 27 against the Wests Tigers, the Gold Coast needed a win to avoid the wooden spoon. The Gold Coast would come from 28 to 10 down at half-time to win 36–28. With Newcastle losing the following day, the Gold Coast avoided last place due to a better for and against.

== Post playing ==
On 2 September 2025, the Gold Coast announced a change to their coaching staff following Des Hasler's exit as coach. The Gold Coast announced that Foran would be taking on a behind the scenes role at the club. On 22 October, the Gold Coast confirmed that Foran would depart the club and return to Sydney to work at Manly.

On 21 November 2025, Foran was elected as a life member by Manly.

On 29 March 2026, Manly confirmed that Foran would be appointed as an interim Head Coach for the remainder of the 2026 NRL season. The appointment was a surprising one considering that Foran had never coached at any level in the game before. In Foran's first game in charge of Manly the club would defeat the Dolphins 52–18.

On 2 June 2026, Manly confirmed that Foran would stay on as their permanent Head Coach of the club until the end of 2029, after an impressive 7–2 start to his coaching tenure at the club. Foran would guide Manly to a 9th-placed finish on the table at the conclusion of the 2026 NRL season.

== Statistics ==
Season	Team	Games	Tries	Goals	F/G	Points
2009	Manly-Warringah Sea Eagles	9	6	-	-	24
2010	Manly-Warringah Sea Eagles	23	4	-	-	16
2011	Manly-Warringah Sea Eagles	26	8	-	-	32
2012	Manly-Warringah Sea Eagles	21	4	-	-	16
2013	Manly-Warringah Sea Eagles	27	2	-	-	8
2014	Manly-Warringah Sea Eagles	22	6	-	-	24
2015	Manly-Warringah Sea Eagles	19	4	4	-	24
2016	Parramatta Eels	9	1	-	-	4
2017	New Zealand Warriors	17	2	-	-	8
2018	Canterbury-Bankstown Bulldogs	12	1	4	1	13
2019	Canterbury-Bankstown Bulldogs	14	3	-	-	12
2020	Canterbury-Bankstown Bulldogs	14	4	-	-	16
2021	Manly-Warringah Sea Eagles	25	4	-	-	16
2022	Manly-Warringah Sea Eagles	13	2	-	-	8
2023	Gold Coast Titans	20	6			24
2024	Gold Coast Titans	21	2			8
2025	Gold Coast Titans	15	1			4
Total		318	60	8	1	258

^{Last updated: 13 June 2025}
