= LaSalle Catholic College, Bankstown =

Location
- 544 Chapel Road; Bankstown, New South Wales, 2200; Australia; 33°54′30″S 151°02′07″E

Information
- Former names: De La Salle College; Benilde High School; Nazareth Senior College
- Type: Independent comprehensive co-educational secondary day school
- Motto: Commitment, Confidence, Success
- Religious affiliation: De La Salle Brothers
- Denomination: Roman Catholic
- Patron saint: Saint John Baptist de La Salle
- Established: 1999; 27 years ago
- Founder: De La Salle Brothers
- Educational authority: New South Wales Education Standards Authority
- Oversight: Sydney Catholic Schools
- Principal: John Colins
- Staff: 140 (2025)
- Years: 7–12
- Enrolment: 1,060 (2025)
- Campus type: Suburban
- Colours: Green and white
- Website: lasalle.syd.catholic.edu.au

LaSalle Catholic College is an independent Roman Catholic comprehensive co-educational secondary day school, located in Bankstown, a south-western suburb of Sydney, New South Wales, Australia. The De La Salle Brothers run the college in the tradition of Saint John Baptist de La Salle.

The college provides a Catholic and general education for students from Year 7 to Year 12, with oversight provided by the Sydney Catholic Schools of the Archdiocese of Sydney.

== History ==
LaSalle Catholic College was formed in 1999. It is an amalgamation of three previous schools that existed on the site – De La Salle College (7–10) (1951–1998), Benilde High School (11–12) (1968–1999), and Nazareth Senior Girls College (11–12). Both Benilde and De La Salle were run by the De La Salle Brothers whilst Nazareth College was run by the Josephite sisters in the tradition of Blessed Mary McKillop. There are no longer Josephite sisters at the college, but several De La Salle Brothers still work at the college and live in the nearby Brothers' Residence.

In 2016, LaSalle Catholic College transitioned from single-sex (boys only) to co-educational with facilities upgraded to accommodate this change.

== Campus ==
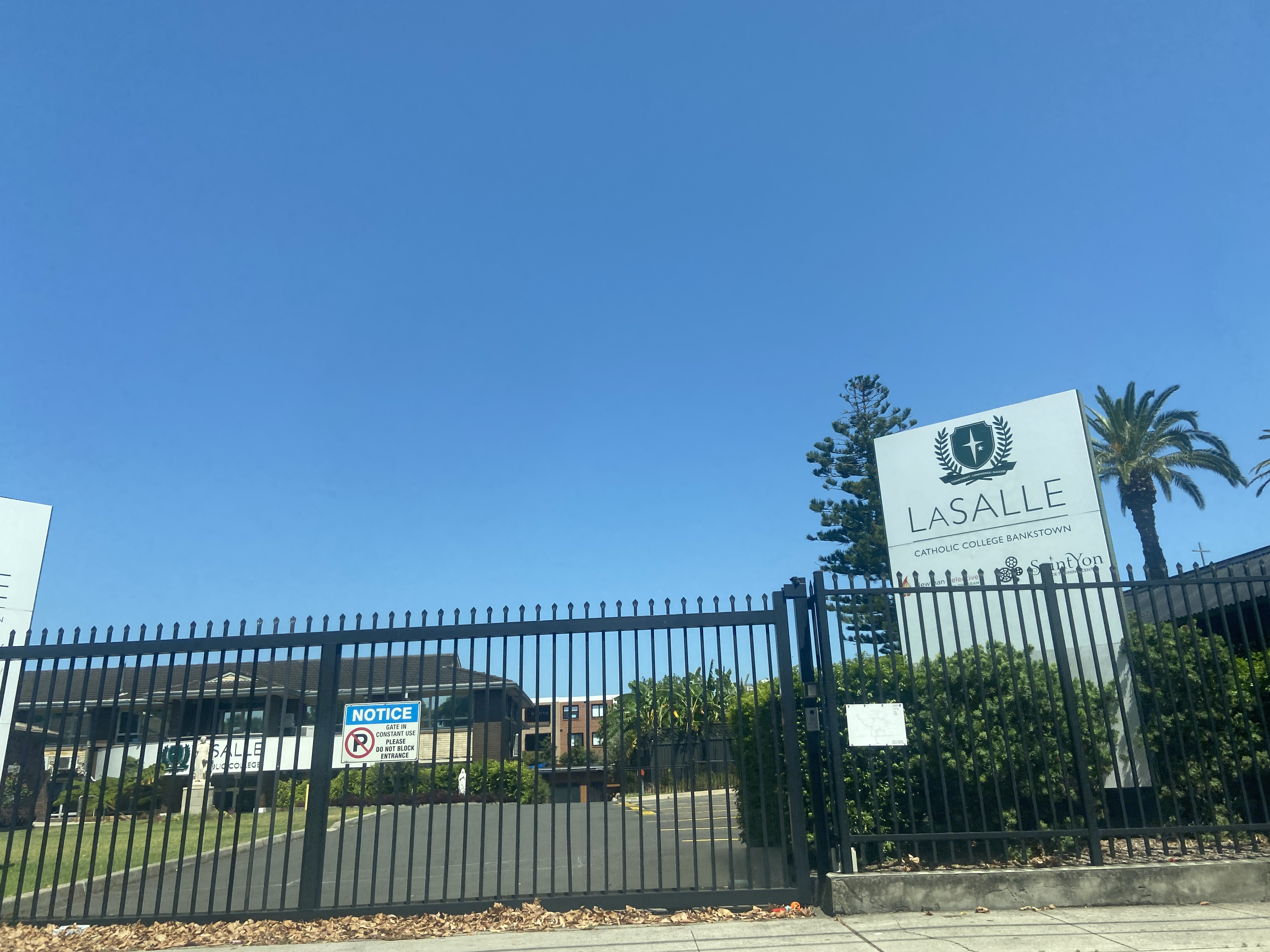
Main entrance on Chapel Road

LaSalle Catholic College is located on a single campus in Bankstown. The college is located near the Hume Highway and occupies a fairly large site which forms part of the Catholic Parish of Saint Felix, Bankstown.

The college has expanded significantly since 1999, with new facilities built as well as upgrading of existing ones. The campus features a modern learning centre, which underwent a significant renovation in 2014. The learning centre is equipped with collaborative study spaces and IT facilities to support student learning. The college gymnasium, located next to the learning centre, contains a full-sized basketball court as well as a weight room. The campus also includes a large grass oval along with a multipurpose sports court for students.

The Saint Yon Trade Training Centre, which delivers vocational training to students was opened in 2013, at a cost of $7 million. In addition to traditional classrooms, the Saint Yon Trade Training Centre contains specialised spaces which simulate industry settings, including workshops for automotive and construction students. The training facility is shared with a number of Catholic schools in Sydney.

The LaSalle 'Heart Building' project, which commenced in 2019, saw the development of a new multi-purpose complex with pedestrian links to neighbouring buildings. The multi-purpose complex delivered under the project includes an expanded gymnasium, a 200-seat lecture theatre, a dance studio and a VET healthcare room. The project was completed in April 2021, at a cost of $11.3 million.

== Co-curriculum ==
=== Sport ===
LaSalle Catholic College competes in the Sydney Catholic Schools Sport, an inter-school sporting competition for Catholic schools in Sydney. Sports offered include athletics, basketball, netball, soccer, swimming and touch football. LaSalle was previously affiliated with the Metropolitan Catholic Colleges Sports Association (MCC).

== Notable alumni ==
- Ben Anderson – former rugby league player
- Mike Bailey – former weatherman for Australian Broadcasting Corporation (also attended De La Salle College Ashfield)
- Mark Bouris – businessman, founder of Wizard Home Loans
- Frank Cicutto – former CEO of National Australia Bank (NAB)
- Michael Hatton – former Australian Labor Party member of the Australian House of Representatives, representing the Division of Blaxland, New South Wales
- Jamal Idris – former rugby league player
- Paul Keating – former Prime Minister of Australia (left at age 14, without graduating)
- Ken Moroney – former Commissioner of the New South Wales Police Force

== See also ==
- List of Catholic schools in New South Wales
- Catholic education in Australia
- Lasallian educational institutions
