= Liam Foran =

New Zealand rugby league footballer

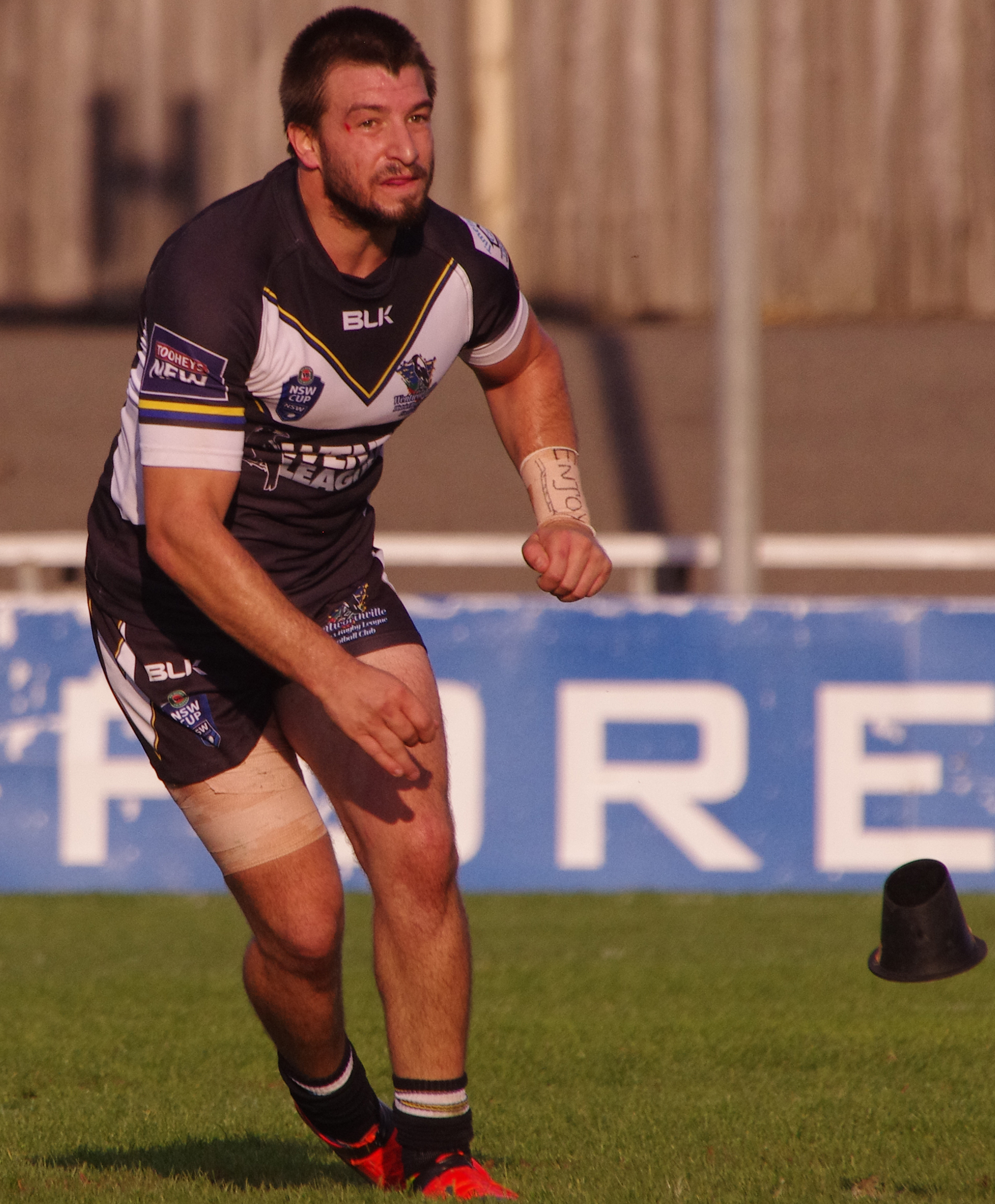
- Foran in 2014

Personal information
- Born: 25 April 1988 (age 38) Auckland, New Zealand
- Height: 180 cm (5 ft 11 in)
- Weight: 84 kg (13 st 3 lb)

Playing information
- Position: Halfback, Five-eighth, Hooker
Club
Years	Team	Pld	T	G	FG	P
2008	Melbourne Storm	3	0	0	0	0
2011–12	Manly Sea Eagles	7	0	0	0	0
2013	Salford City Reds	15	1	0	1	4
2014	London Broncos	0	0	0	0	0
	Total	25	1	0	1	4
- Source: As of May 2015
- Education: Ellerslie Primary School; Marist Catholic College North Shore
- Father: Greg Foran
- Relatives: Kieran Foran (brother)

Liam Foran (born 25 April 1988) is a New Zealand former professional rugby league footballer who has played for the Cessnock Goannas in the Newcastle Rugby League Competition in Newcastle, Australia, as a five-eighth or halfback.

== Background ==
Liam Foran was born in Auckland, New Zealand. He is the brother of NRL player Kieran Foran.

== Early career ==
Foran played his junior football at the Ellerslie Eagles Rugby League Football Club in the Auckland Rugby League competition. Foran went to Ellerslie Primary School before moving over to Sydney. He moved to St Ives on the North Shore of Sydney, where he teams St Ives North Public School with fellow future National Rugby League player Mitchell Pearce.

In 2001, he began high school at Marist Catholic College North Shore. He also represented the North Sydney Bears junior teams before signing with Melbourne in 2007. While attending Marist Catholic College North Shore, Foran played for the school competition representative squad, MCC (Metropolitan Catholic Colleges), leading him to NSW CCC (New South Wales Combined Catholic Colleges) and eventually 2006 Australian Schoolboys which toured England and France. During the tour he surprised some by stating his desire to replace Stacey Jones as New Zealand's long-term halfback. One year later, he made the 2007 Junior Kiwis squad and played a key part in the team defeating the Junior Kangaroos. Ironically, it was Liam's younger brother Kieran who would take a similar role barring injury, debuting in 2009, captaining the side twice & playing a crucial role in their 2014 Four Nations Title & run to the 2013 Rugby League World Cup final.

== Melbourne ==
In 2008, Foran joined Melbourne's Toyota Cup (Under-20s) team, and also played three first grade games for the club during the State of Origin period.

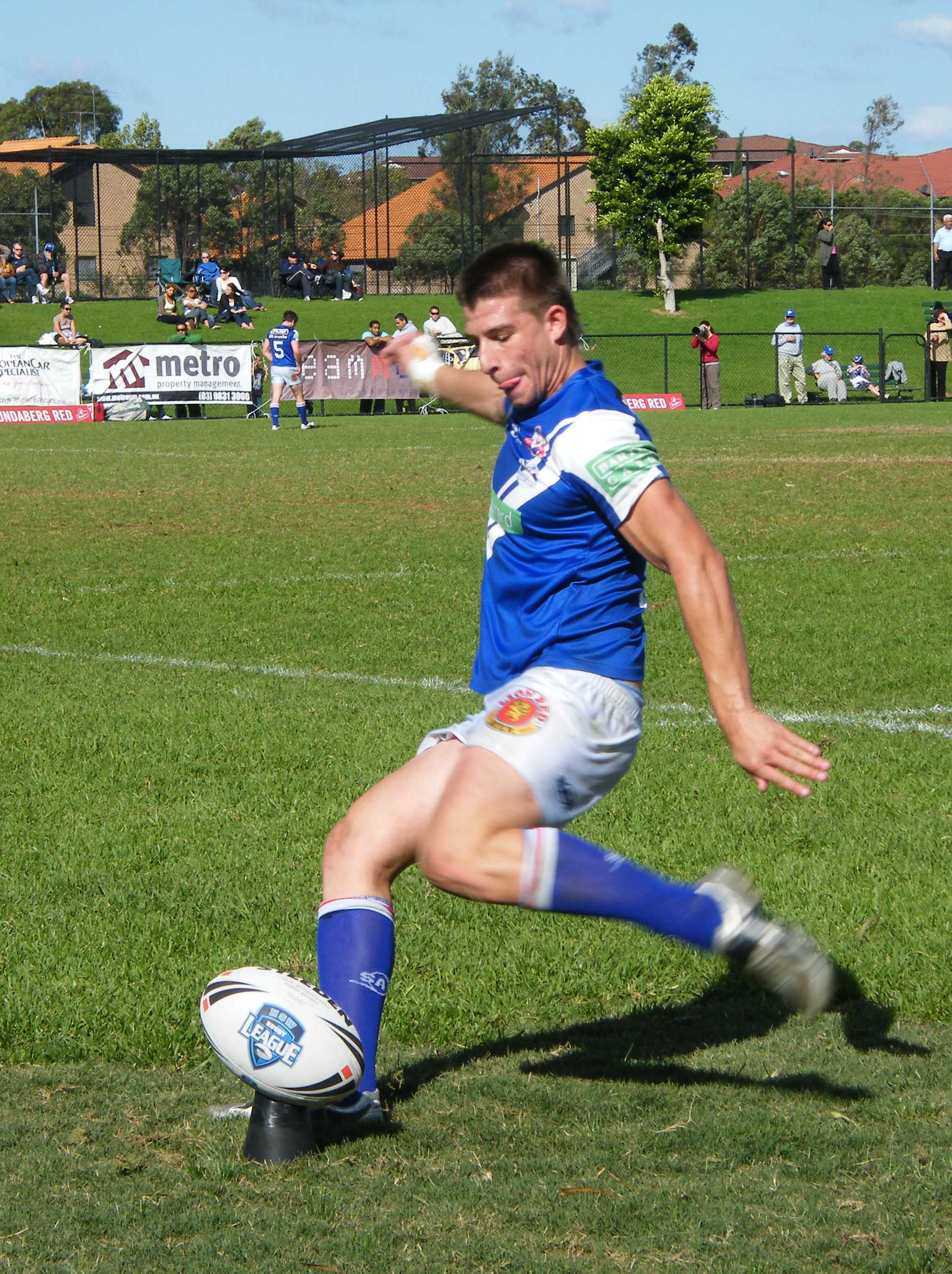
Foran playing for the Vulcans

== Auckland ==
Foran signed for the New Zealand Warriors for the 2009 NRL season, with an option for the 2010 season. However he was released by the club in June, without playing a senior game. Instead he played the first half of the season with the Auckland Vulcans in the New South Wales Cup. Foran represented the NSW Residents in 2009 against the Queensland Residents due to good form while with the Auckland Vulcans.

== Sydney Roosters ==
After leaving the Warriors, Foran joined the Newtown Jets. He then signed for the Jets' parent club, the Sydney Roosters, for the 2010 season.

== Manly-Warringah Sea Eagles ==
Foran signed with the Manly-Warringah Sea Eagles for the 2011 NRL season, joining his brother Kieran. Foran made his first grade début during the 2012 Manly Warringah Sea Eagles season on 9 April, replacing his younger brother in the team at five-eighth after Kieran was ruled out with a hamstring injury and made a solid contribution in helping Manly end a three-game losing streak with a 30–0 win over Penrith at Brookvale Oval.

This was his first first grade game since 2008, when he played on three occasions for the Melbourne Storm during the State of Origin Series. During that gap, he played for the Toyota Cup or NSW Cup squads for all the clubs he signed, the Melbourne Storm's Under 20's team nicknamed "The Thunderbolts", the New Zealand Warriors' reserve-grade team the Auckland Vulcans, the Sydney Roosters' reserve-grade team Newtown and the Manly-Warringah Sea Eagles NSW Cup team of the same name.

== London Broncos ==
In June 2014, Foran signed a two-year contract with the London Broncos ahead of their 2015 campaign in the Kingstone Press Championship, following the club's relegation from the Super League. Having previously played in England for the Salford City Reds, Foran stated that he returned to the British game to settle "unfinished business."

Despite the two-year agreement, Foran never made a competitive first-grade appearance for the Broncos. Prior to the conclusion of his contract, he and the club mutually agreed to a release, allowing Foran to return to Australia for personal reasons ahead of the birth of his first child.
