= Marist College Kogarah =

Secondary school in Sydney, Australia

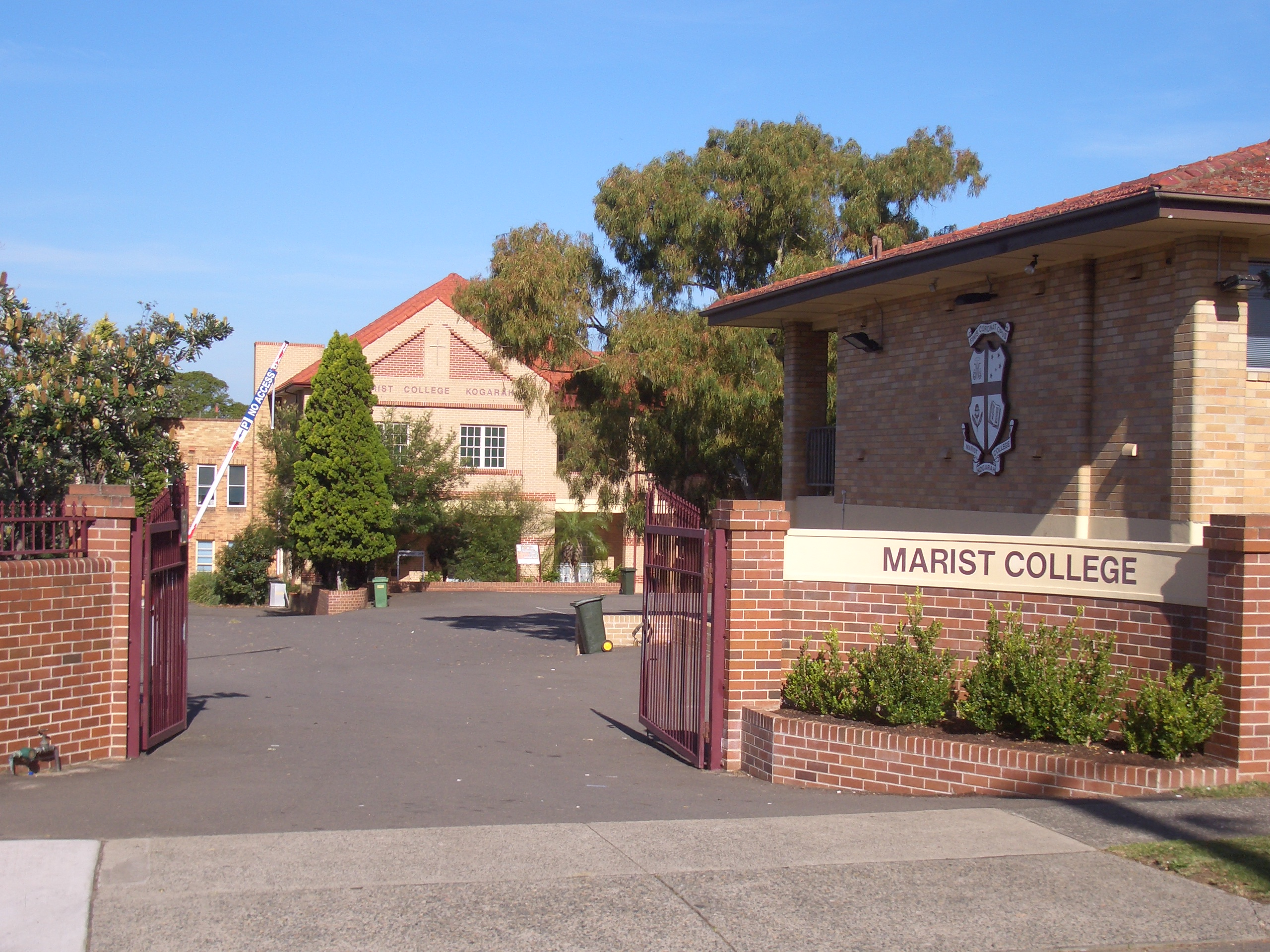
- Marist College Kogarah

Location
- Bexley, St George region, Sydney, New South Wales; Australia; 33°57′29″S 151°7′49″E

Information
- Former name: Marist Brothers Kogarah
- Type: Independent single sex secondary day school
- Motto: Latin: Finis Coronat Opus (“The End Crowns The Work”)
- Religious affiliation: Marist Brothers
- Denomination: Roman Catholicism
- Established: 1909; 117 years ago
- Educational authority: New South Wales Department of Education
- Oversight: Archdiocese of Sydney
- Principal: David Forrester
- Staff: 96+
- Years: 7–12
- Gender: Boys (Co-Ed; 1984-1993)
- Enrolment: c. 1,200 (2007)
- Colours: Blue, red and white
- Athletics: Metropolitan Catholic Colleges Sports Association
- Affiliations: Association of Marist Schools of Australia
- Website: mckogarah.syd.catholic.edu.au

Marist College Kogarah is an independent Roman Catholic single sex secondary day school for boys, located in Bexley, a suburb located in the St George region of Sydney, New South Wales, Australia.

The college was founded in 1909, and has a tradition based on the teachings of the French educator Saint Marcellin Champagnat, the founder of the Marist Brothers. The school offers education to approximately 1,200 students from Year 7 to Year 12.

== History ==
Marist College Kogarah was established in 1908 as the Kogarah Boys' School, a primary school for boys. The Marist Brothers agreed to establish the school after requests by John O'Driscoll, parish priest of the new parish of Kogarah. During 1908 a hundred pupils were enrolled, it then being the only Catholic boys school in New South Wales south west of Newtown. As demand for secondary education grew in the region, junior secondary classes were added to the school in the late 1920s. By 1938, it was a full secondary school, presenting pupils for the Leaving Certificate. By the 1940s, it was the largest Catholic school in Australia. In the 1960s, the school became part of the new Archdiocesan system of schools and this had important consequences for Kogarah. Parish schools were preferred for primary education and so in 1982 primary classes ended at Marist Brothers Kogarah. From 1984, senior girls were enrolled in Years 11 and 12. This was, however, short-lived, due to the establishment of Bethany College in 1993.

== School crest and motto ==
Over the years the school has had three crest designs. They all have in common a red cross dividing a shield into four fields. Above the shield is the school motto Finis Coronat Opus, meaning "The End Crowns the Work"; below is the school name. The redesigns were required after the school's name was altered. The crest's symbols were also rearranged after the first redesign. The fields contain the following symbols:

- The Marist symbol
- The Southern Cross, the symbol of Australia
- The Waratah, the symbol of New South Wales
- An open book to symbolise learning

== Principals ==
The following individuals have served as principal of Marist College Kogarah:

Ordinal	Principal	Term start	Term end	Time in office	Notes
1	Br. Gonzaga Brown	1909	1914	4–5 years	
2	Br. Athanaius Raess	1915	1918	2–3 years	
3	Br. Ildephonsus Bassett	1919	1921	1–2 years	
4	Br. Hubert Prowse	1922	1927	4–5 years	
5	Br. Stanislaus Dillon	1928	1933	4–5 years	
6	Br. Cyrill Ryan	1934	1934	0 years	
7	Br. Aidan O'Keefe	1935	1937	1–2 years	
8	Br. Ethelred Ferguson	1938	1940	1–2 years	
9	Br. Placidus Redden	1941	1945	3–4 years	
10	Br. Maurus Bartlett	1946	1951	4–5 years	
11	Br. Othmar Weldon	1952	1954	1–2 years	
12	Br. Michael Naughtin	1955	1956	0–1 years	
13	Br. Laurence McKeon	1957	1962	4–5 years	
14	Br. Frederick McMahon	1963	1968	4–5 years	
15	Br. Baptist Gillogly	1969	1974	4–5 years	
16	Br. Osmund	1974	1975	0–1 years	
17	Br. Geoffrey Joy	1976	1976	0 years	
18	Br. Christopher Wade	1977	1980	2–3 years	
19	Br. John O'Brien	1981	1986	4–5 years	
20	Br. Patrick Foley	1987	1992	4–5 years	
21	Peter McNamara	1992	1996	3–4 years	
22	Brian Roberts	1996	2000	3–4 years	
23	Patrick O'Connor	2001	2007	5–6 years	
24	Damian Millar	2007	2008	0–1 years	
25	John Riordan	2009	2020	16–17 years	
26	Simon Ghantous	2021	2024	5–6 years	
27	David Forrester	2025			

== Notable alumni ==
=== Academic ===
- Glyn Davis AC – vice-chancellor of the University of Melbourne

=== Clergy ===
- Cardinal Sir Norman Thomas Gilroy – first Australian cardinal; Australian of the Year 1971
- Bishop Edward Kelly – former bishop of Toowoomba
- Monsignor John Slowey – director of the Sydney Catholic Education Office; co-founder of the Australian Catholic University

=== Entertainment, media and the arts ===
- Warren Fahey AM – Australian folklorist, founder of Folkways Music and Larrikin Records, former deputy managing director of Festival Mushroom Group
- John Hargreaves – actor; only actor to receive the Byron Kennedy Award
- Chris Holland – former 2007 college co-vice captain, member of Australian band Operator Please
- Paul Mac (Paul McDermott) – DJ and musician
- Paul Merciadez – member of Justice Dance Crew who won Australia's Got Talent in 2010
- Geoff Plummer (1954–2006) – founding member and original drummer for 50s revival band Ol' 55
- Dom Turner – blues guitarist and founder of The Backsliders

=== Politics, economics, public service and the law ===
- John Ajaka – politician and member of the New South Wales Legislative Council
- Kevin Greene – former politician and member of the New South Wales Legislative Assembly
- Chris Minns – 47th premier of New South Wales and Leader of Labor Party in NSW
- Graham Richardson – former Senator for New South Wales and cabinet minister

=== Sport ===
- Paul Alamoti – current rugby league footballer for the Penrith Panthers
- Peter Armstrong – rugby league footballer; St. George Dragons hooker (1957–1964)
- Jim Bailey – athlete; Olympian (Melbourne 1956)
- Michael Beattie – former rugby league footballer for the St. George Dragons; captain
- George Carstairs – rugby league footballer for the St. George Dragons (1921–1929) and Australian representative (1921–1922)
- Matt Dufty – current rugby league footballer for Warrington Wolves
- Frank Farrell – former rugby league footballer who played for Newtown Jets, NSW and Australia
- Keith Galloway – rugby league footballer for the Wests Tigers and the Cronulla Sharks, played for Australia
- Michael Korkidas – former rugby league footballer for the Sydney Roosters in the NRL, and various clubs in the Super League
- Ray Lindwall – cricket player; considered one of the greatest fast bowlers of all time
- Daryl Millard – former rugby league footballer for the St. George Illawarra Dragons and Canterbury Bulldogs
- George Ndaira – former rugby league footballer for the Newcastle Knights, St. George Illawarra Dragons and South Sydney Rabbitohs
- Kerry O'Keeffe – Australian cricketer and commentator
- Josh Reynolds – former rugby league footballer for the Wests Tigers (formerly Canterbury Bulldogs)
- Warren Saunders – former NSW and St George cricket captain
- Jason Stevens – former rugby league footballer for the Cronulla Sharks, Australian Kangaroos and NSW Blues
- Robert Stone – former rugby league footballer for the St. George Dragons and NSW Blues
- Robert Windle – Olympic gold medallist in the 1500 m freestyle (Tokyo 1964) – swimming

== See also ==
- List of Catholic schools in New South Wales
- Catholic education in Australia
