= Corpus Christi College Maroubra =

Location
- Maroubra, Sydney, New South Wales; Australia; 33°56′48″S 151°13′49″E

Information
- Former names: Marist Brothers Pagewood; Marist College Pagewood; Champagnat Catholic College Pagewood
- Type: Independent comprehensive co-educational secondary day school
- Motto: Know God's Love
- Religious affiliation: Marist Brothers
- Denomination: Roman Catholic
- Patron saint: Marcellin Champagnat
- Established: 1961; 65 years ago
- Sister school: Our Lady of the Sacred Heart College
- Oversight: Catholic Education Office of the Archdiocese of Sydney
- Principal: Andrew Maher
- Teaching staff: 57.4 FTE
- Years: 7–12
- Enrolment: 755 (2025)
- Average class size: ~30
- Campus type: Suburban
- Houses: Chisholm; Chanel; Francis; Mackillop; Ozanam; Chavoin
- Colours: Black and gold
- Song: Sub Tuum
- Affiliation: Sydney Catholic Schools
- Website: cccmaroubra.syd.catholic.edu.au

Corpus Christi College Maroubra is an independent Roman Catholic comprehensive co-educational secondary day school located in Maroubra, an eastern suburb of Sydney, New South Wales, Australia. The college was founded in 1961 by the Marist Brothers, a Catholic order of teaching brothers founded in France in the early nineteenth century by Saint Marcellin Champagnat.

The college, after being known as Marist Brothers Pagewood and later Marist College Pagewood for over 50 years, changed to Champagnat Catholic College Pagewood in 2014 as part of a range of organisational and educational changes initiated by the college. In 2023, the College renamed to Corpus Christi College as part of its transition from a single-sex (all boys) school to co-educational school.

== History ==
The land on which the school is built was purchased during the time that Monsignor Denis Conaghan was parish priest of Maroubra, in the years 1939–1954. Father John Power was appointed parish priest of Pagewood and was instrumental in the development of the school over the next 30 years.

In 1960, building began on the John Power wing at the instigation of Mgr Barney Hudson, the parish priest from 1954 to 1974. The architect for the project was Neville Anderson from the University of New South Wales. The main two-storey block contained eight classrooms, library, manual arts room and four cloak rooms. A single-storeyed extension contained toilet facilities for the boys, accommodation for three brothers and the school canteen. This building was opened by Cardinal Norman Gilroy on 29 January 1961. Three years later, construction of the monastery began. The building was delayed due to a season of constant rain, but on the appointed day, 12 May, the building still in an uncompleted state was solemnly blessed and officially opened by Cardinal Gilroy. The monastery has accommodation for ten brothers and the building included a study, chapel and small flat for the housekeeper.

The school was established in 1961. Originally it was formed as a primary school with 84 students and later became a high school in 1969.

== Sport ==
Until 2022, the college was a member of the Metropolitan Catholic Colleges Sports Association where high level competition games, are played against Catholic high schools, within the Sydney Metropolitan area.

== Notable alumni ==
- John Berne, rugby League and rugby union player
- Stan Browne, former rugby league player
- Dean Hawkins, rugby league player
- Peter Mamouzelos, rugby league player
- Cameron McInnes, rugby league player
- Sam Robson, English Test cricketer
- Bob Spencer, rock guitarist
- Victor Radley, rugby league player
- Matt Thistlethwaite, Incumbent MP for the Division of Kingsford Smith for the Australian Labor Party, former senator

== See also ==
- List of Catholic schools in New South Wales
- Catholic education in Australia
- Gregory Sutton
