= Association of Marist Schools of Australia =

Australian school association

The Association of Marist Schools of Australia (MSA) is an organisation that seeks to unite the various schools across Australia which have at any stage in their history been connected to the Australian provinces of the Marist Brothers, Marist Sisters or Marist Fathers, and by that union assist them in the provision of quality Marist education according to the traditions and charism passed down by the founders of the orders, Saint Marcellin Champagnat, Sister Jeanne-Marie Chavoin and Jean-Claude Colin.

The Association organises sporting competitions which attract competitors from many of the nation's Marist schools, in basketball, cricket, netball and oratory. It also coordinates a biennial conference of Marist educators, to strengthen their sense of Marist identity and spirituality, and affirm their mission of evangelization.

== Sexual abuse allegations ==
In June, July and August 2014 the Royal Commission into Institutional Responses to Child Sexual Abuse, a royal commission of inquiry initiated in 2013 by the Australian Government and supported by all of its state governments, began an investigation into the response of Marist Brothers to allegations of child sexual abuse in schools in the ACT, NSW and Queensland. Five former students, one former teacher, a former assistant principal and two former principals, former and current Marist officials and clergy, and one of the clergy at the centre of the allegations gave evidence or made statements before the Royal Commission that the alleged cases of abuse happened during the 1970s and 1980s at Daramalan College, Canberra, at Lismore, Campbelltown and in Far North Queensland.

In March 2015 a former Marist brother was arrested over a number of sex offences allegedly committed at St Joseph's College in Hunters Hill and St Gregory's College in Campbelltown in the 1980s.
