= Jean-Claude Courveille =

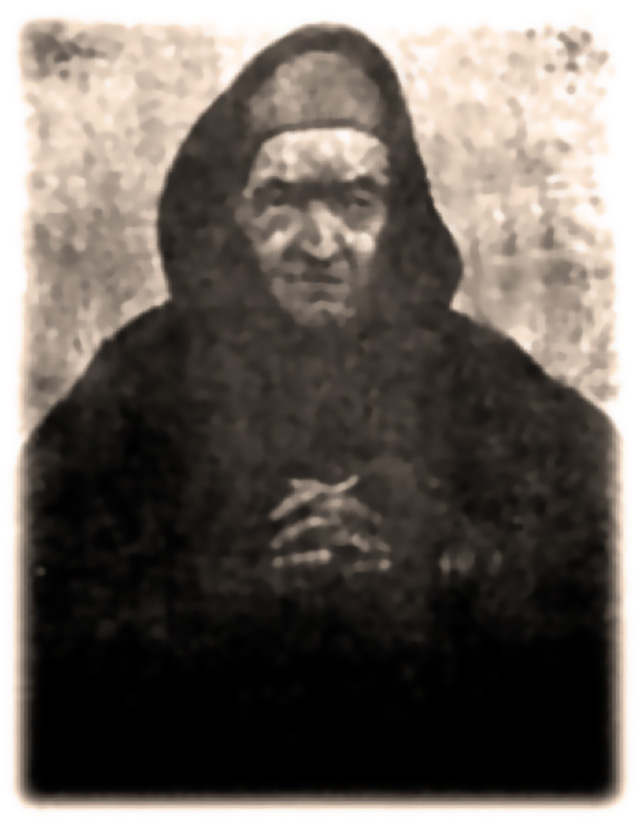
- Born: 15 May 1787; Usson-en-Forez, France
- Died: 25 September 1866 (aged 79); Solesmes Abbey, Sarthe, France
- Occupation: Catholic Priest

Signature
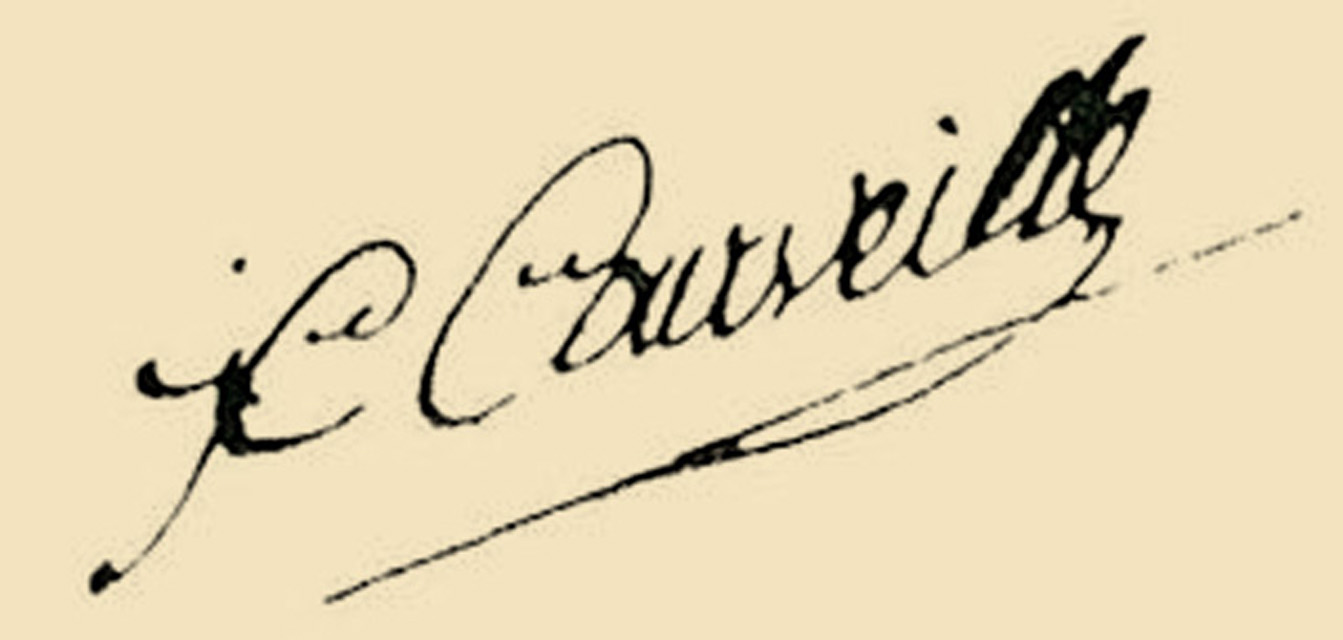

Jean-Claude Courveille, born in Usson-en-Forez on May 15, 1787, and died on September 25, 1866, in Solesmes, was a French Catholic priest.

He is known for his involvement in the "Group of Saint-Irénée" along with the seminarian Étienne Déclas. For his attempts to make himself known as the founder of the Society of Mary (Marists), established by Jean-Claude Colin. For his attempts to make himself known as the founder of the Marist Brothers, established by Saint Marcellin Champagnat. For a miracle and revelations that he said he received from the Virgin Mary (never recognized by the Catholic Church) and for the sexual assaults on a minor that he committed (recognized by the Catholic Church).

== Biography ==
Jean-Claude Courveille was born in Usson-en-Forez on May 15, 1787, and died on September 15, 1866, in Solesmes. His parents Claude Courveille and Marguerite Beynieux (ep. Courveille) were lace merchants. He had a sister, Jeanne Courveille.

During the French Revolution his parents, devout Catholics, hid in their house a statue of the Virgin Mary that was venerated in the village as "Our Lady of Chambriac" and was said to have miraculous powers.

== Entrance into religion and the Saint-Irénée Group ==
In 1812, Jean-Claude Courveille entered the seminary of the diocese of Saint-Flour.

In 1814, he entered the seminary of Saint-Irénée of Lyon (as the Concordat had attached his parish of origin to this diocese).

In 1815, Jean-Claude Courveille and Étienne Déclas decided to form a group that brought together the seminarians of the seminary of Saint-Irénée in Lyon, supporting the idea of creating a structure dedicated to the Virgin Mary.

This informal group (without legal value) was nevertheless taken very seriously by its members, for whom it represented a moral commitment. They established and signed a "declaration of intention" on July 23, 1816, in which they pledged to work with all their strength for the establishment of a Society of Mary. The different people who subsequently committed and supported the creation of a society of Mary would sign this declaration of intention. This group would later become known as the "Group of Saint-Irénée."

It would see several of its members successfully create structures, more or less lasting, dedicated to the Virgin Mary; notably Jean-Claude Colin with his Society of Mary (the Marists) and Saint Marcellin Champagnat with the Marist Brothers (which would become one of the four branches of Jean-Claude Colin's Society of Mary).

From 1815 to 1820, Jean-Claude Courveille was, by mutual agreement among the group members, considered as the representative/spokesperson of the Group.

In 1817-1819, the relationships with members of the Group of Saint-Irénée began to deteriorate. He requested that the title of Superior General be officially attached to him, which the other members refused. He then requested that all members of the Group financially support his personal expenses (on the grounds that he was their superior) and fund the mariist projects he had established. The Group members refused again.

Starting in 1820, the figure of Jean-Claude Colin gradually emerged. On June 4, 1826, Jean-Claude Courveille resigned from the Group of Saint-Irénée and his project of the Society of Mary (on September 24, 1836, the election of the very first superior of the Society of Mary took place. Jean-Claude Colin was elected).

== Courveille and his Mariist project ==
Jean-Claude Courveille wishes to create the "Most Holy Congregation of Mariists".

The term Mariists combines the Latin suffix "ist/ista" (used to indicate adherence to a certain doctrine) with the root Mari (Mari = Marie in French, Mary, Holy Mary mother of God).

On July 22, 1816, Jean-Claude Courveille was ordained priest and appointed vicar of the parish of Verrières-en-Forez, where he formed the association of " lay association of the Holy Family " that he intends to make the "Third Order of the Mariists".

In 1817-1818, Jean-Claude Courveille claims to have had a revelation. He declares that the king of France, Louis XVIII, would join the Society of Mary (which never happened), and the Virgin Mary would then give him all the power that she possessed. Within the Group of Saint-Irénée and among his hierarchy, reserve start to arise about him.

From 1817 to 1819, he is assigned to Rive-de-Gier. There, he finds a group of female teachers established by his predecessor. He convinces some of them to become the "Sisters of Mary". In Saint-Clair-du-Rhône, he creates a second group of female teachers, "Sisters of Mary". According to his plan, all of them are eventually meant to become Mariist Sisters.

In 1819, Jean-Claude Courveille is appointed parish priest of Épercieux-Saint-Paul. He takes charge of the training of two teachers, with whom he opens a school in the nearby town of Feurs in 1822.

In 1819-1820, Courveille approaches the bishopric of Grenoble to try to establish the "Congregation of Mariists" (the term "Most Holy" is not mentioned in his request). However, this action does not come to fruition.

In 1824, Courveille, according to his project "Congregation of the Mariists," attempted to open a novitiate and establish a community of "missionary priests" who would aid the parish clergy. This attempt failed.

On September 7, 1826, he obtained authorization from the bishop of Grenoble to create a new school called "The Brothers of the Congregation of Mary" in the city of Saint-Clair-du-Rhône (where he established the "Sisters of Mary" in 1817-1819). The Prefect of the department approved and financed the project with 1,600 francs. On December 10, 1826, the municipal council of Saint-Clair-du-Rhône adopted a resolution to finance the school supplies.

In 1827, the school of "The Brothers of the Congregation of Mary" was opened. On this occasion, the Prefect of the department provided additional funding of 2,300 francs.

In 1828, the school of "The Brothers of the Congregation of Mary" was closed. The municipal and prefectural authorities withdrew their support due to negligence in the education and training of children as well as frequent absences.

== Letter to Pope Pius VII ==
On January 5, 1822, Jean-Claude Courveille was one of the three signatories of a letter sent to Pope Pius VII. Jean-Claude Colin, a member of the Saint-Irénée Group, has been working since 1817 on a project for the Society of Mary (the Marists). As part of this project, Bishop François-Marie Bigex recommended that he write directly to Pope Pius VII to submit his proposal. Based on this recommendation, the members of the Saint-Irénée Group decided to address a letter to the pope, dated January 5, 1822.

This letter was signed by Jean-Claude Colin (author of the project), Pierre Colin (a priest who acted as secretary within the Saint-Irénée Group and for his brother Jean-Claude Colin), and by Jean-Claude Courveille (representing the entire Saint-Irénée Group). Later on, Jean-Claude Courveille would use this letter to try to claim the foundation of the Society of Mary established by Jean-Claude Colin.

== Courveille and the Marist Brothers of the Schools ==
Marcellin Champagnat's project was to establish teaching brothers to catechize and educate children in rural areas. This project, which predates his entry into the seminary and his affiliation to the Saint-Irénée Group, officially began with the training of the first two brothers, Jean-Marie Granjon and Jean-Baptiste Audras, on January 2, 1817. Initially called "Little Brothers of Mary," they later became the "Marist Brothers of the Schools."

On May 12, 1824, Jean-Claude Courveille's request to be transferred from the parish of Épercieux-Saint-Paul to the parish of La Valla-en-Gier, where Marcelin Champagnat was serving, was accepted in order to assist Champagnat in the management of the schools he has opened.

On July 19, 1824, Jean-Claude Courveille distributed informative brochure about the schools established by Marcelin Champagnat, in which he identified himself as "Priest, Superior General" and Champagnat as the "Priest Director." In another letter, addressed directly to the Diocese of Lyon, he presented himself as the "founder of the congregation of the Little Brothers of Mary." These actions were Jean-Claude Courveille's first attempts to claim the foundation of the Little Brothers of Mary established by Marcelin Champagnat.

On July 28, 1824, the Diocese of Lyon sent a letter countering this action and confirming Marcelin Champagnat as the founder.

In 1825, Jean-Claude Courveille tried to exercise direct authority over the brothers and priests involved in the "Little Brothers of Mary" of Marcelin Champagnat. They refused his authority and directives, stating that they only recognized the authority of Marcellin Champagnat. In response to this situation, Jean-Claude Courveille requested a vote among the brothers (excluding the priests) for them to choose a superior between Marcellin Champagnat and himself. The brothers voted unanimously for Champagnat. Jean-Claude Courveille then requested a vote among the priests (three at that time) for them to choose a superior. His request for a vote was rejected and no vote was organized.

In 1826, Jean-Claude Courveille contacted the diocesan authorities to complain by name about Marcelin Champagnat, about the poor training he provided to the brothers, his mismanagement of financial affairs, and the widespread lack of religious discipline observance. Following this report, the vicar general Simon Cattet was sent to inspect Marcelin Champagnat, the brothers, and the schools. In his report, Simon Cattet mentioned that, in his opinion, the training of the brothers involved too much work.

== Departure of Jean-Claude Courveille from the Saint-Irénée Group ==
In May 1826, Jean-Claude Courveille decided to go on a pilgrimage to the Aiguebelle Abbey, which was then occupied by the Trappist monks. On June 4, 1826, he wrote a letter to Marcelin Champagnat and Étienne Terraillon (members of the Saint-Irénée Group, currently active priests with Marcelin Champagnat and his Little Brothers of Mary) and requested that it be read to the entire community.

In this letter, Jean-Claude Courveille criticized the differences of opinion concerning "purpose, form, intentions and spirit of the true Society of Mary" as well as the "independence, the lack of submission, and the lack of observance". He also informed them that he wished to become a Trappist monk at the Aiguebelle Abbey and asked them, if they thought his departure was a good thing, to accept his resignation and transfer.

He signed the letter as "Marist founder and Superior general, unworthy priest".

Marcellin Champagnat and Jean-Claude Colin (representing the Saint-Irénée Group at that time) accepted Jean-Claude Courveille's resignation and transfer.

On June 11, 1826, after receiving the letter informing him that his resignation and transfer were accepted, Jean-Claude Courveille left the Aiguebelle Abbey. On June 12, 1826, he arrived in Saint-Chamond and asked to meet with Marcelin Champagnat to request reinstatement among the Little Brothers of Mary and inside the Society of Mary project. However, Marcelin Champagnat refused.

Faced with this refusal, Jean-Claude Courveille asked to meet with the bishop of the diocese of Lyon to request his reassignment by authority to Marcelin Champagnat and his Little Brothers of Mary. However, the bishop refused and informed him that there would be no position for him in the diocese. He did, however, give him a celebret which authorized him to celebrate Mass.

In July 1826, Jean-Claude Courveille went to Cerdon to ask the community of Marist Fathers (a community established on October 29, 1824 by Jean-Claude Colin, in accordance with his project for the Society of Mary) to accept him into their midst. They refused.

== Searching for a new parish and sexual assaults ==
Jean-Claude Courveille was denied a new assignment by the bishop of the Lyon diocese, but he was granted a celebret in 1826. With this first celebret, Jean-Claude Courveille managed to obtain another celebret from the bishop of Chambéry on July 19, 1826.

After the failure of the school "The Brothers of the Congregation of Mary" (Les Frères de la Congrégation de Marie) in the town of Saint-Clair-du-Rhône, Jean-Claude Courveille wanted to settle in a new town and parish. He obtained a celebret from the bishop of Grenoble in 1828.

The archives of the Nîmes, Toulouse, Limoges, and Clermont-Ferrand dioceses show that he contacted them for this purpose and used the three celebrets, two of which were falsified (those from Lyon and Chambéry showing the date of 1828 instead of 1826).

In 1829, he returns to Cerdon to once again ask the Marist Fathers community to accept him into their midst and be integrated into the Society of Mary of Jean-Claude Colin. They refused again.

In 1829, he settled in Apinac, his mother's hometown, where his sister Jeanne had been living since 1824, and where his maternal uncle, Mathieu Beynieux, was a priest of the parish. At that time, the parish was under the jurisdiction of the Lyon diocese. The diocese authorized him to celebrate Mass with his uncle, the parish priest, but refused to assign him to the parish. Although appreciated by the population, his mental health was called into question. He was known to enjoy walking around with a bishop's Galero hat and an episcopal crozier.

In 1832, following a child's testimony to his mother and the subsequent investigation, it was discovered that six children had been sexually assaulted by Jean-Claude Courveille. Mathieu Beynieux, the parish priest and maternal uncle, refused to allow Jean-Claude Courveille to continue celebrating Mass in the parish. The Lyon diocese issued an interdict against Jean-Claude Courveille.

In 1832, Jean-Claude Courveille once again asks to be admitted into the Society of Mary of Jean-Claude Colin. Which is again refused to him.

In February 1833, based on three falsified celebrets and the lack of control by the diocesan authorities of Bourges, Jean-Claude Courveille managed to be appointed priest of the chapel of the charity hospital in Châteauroux.

On October 7, 1833, the diocesan authorities of Bourges received "troubling" information about Courveille and decided he "needs to be watched" but allowed him to remain in.

On August 17, 1835, Jean-Claude Courveille was accused of "grave moral fault". He then requested permission to leave the diocese, which was granted on September 8, 1835.

On October 24, 1835, by falsifying new documents, Jean-Claude Courveille managed to have himself appointed priest in the parish of Witry-les-Reims in the diocese of Reims. However, in April 1836, he was removed from the list of priests of the diocese.

From April to July 1836, Jean-Claude Courveille may have been incarcerated in Reims prison.

According to Father Benoit Lagniet, priest in charge of collecting information on the beginnings of the Society of Mary of Jean-Claude Colin, Courveille would have "compromised himself" while serving in the parish of Witry-les-Reims, "and what put in prison". However, the archives of Marne department and the Reims prison having been destroyed during the First World War, there is no longer any material evidence to confirm or refute this statement.

== Solesmes Abbey and death of Jean-Claude Courveille ==
On July 9, 1836, Jean-Claude Courveille contacts the Bishop of Le Mans to request to be assigned to the Solesmes Abbey. The Bishop of Le Mans does not request any information or documents concerning him from the previous dioceses; he just questions him verbally. Satisfied with his answers, he accepts his request and contacts the superior of the Solesmes Abbey to ask him to welcome Jean-Claude Courveille.

On August 27, 1836, Jean-Claude Courveille enters the novitiate of the Abbey. On March 21, 1838, he pronounced his solemn vows and became a monk of the Abbey. He remained there until the end of his life on September 25, 1866.

== Miraculous healing and Marian revelations ==
According to Jean-Claude Courveille's testimony, he was infected with the smallpox virus at the age of ten, which left him almost blind (1797). He wanted to become a priest but this significant visual impairment prevented him from doing so.

In 1809, he decided to go on a pilgrimage to Le Puy Cathedral. There, after rubbing his eyes with the oil from a lamp burning in front of a statue of the Virgin Mary, he regained complete and perfect vision. He was then able to join the seminary and decided, in thanksgiving, to devote himself to the service of Mary.

On August 25, 1812, in Le Puy Cathedral, at the foot of the same statue, he declared he internally heard the Virgin Mary speaking to him, declaring that just as Ignatius of Loyola had established the Society of Jesus, she wants a society to be dedicated to her.

In 1817-1818, Jean-Claude Courveille claimed to have had a new revelation. He said that the French king, Louis XVIII, would join the Society of Mary that would be created, and the Virgin Mary would then grant him all her powers.

In 1832, he threatened the members of the Society of Mary with a curse from the Virgin Mary if they continued to refuse to include him among them and appoint him as the Superior General of the Society of Mary created.

== Sources ==
- "Bon Séjour dans l'Agglomération du Puy-en-Verlay" (PDF). le Puy en Velay Office de Tourisme. p. 18. Archived from the original (PDF) on 2013-07-29.
- Louis-Laurent, Frère (July 1956). "Historique des origines de l'Institut". Bulletin de l'Institut 163. XXII.
- Rivatton, B. (7 March 2009). "Les missions Maristes". Archived from the original on 2014-04-15.
- Trénard, Gabrielle (1994). de Montclos, Xavier (ed.). Lyon, Le Lyonnais, Le Beaujolais. Dictionnaire du monde religieux dans la France contemporaine (in French). Paris: Éditions Beauchesne. ISBN 978-2-7010-1305-3.
- "Verrières". Histoire du Forez.
