= Marist College, Auckland =

Marist College
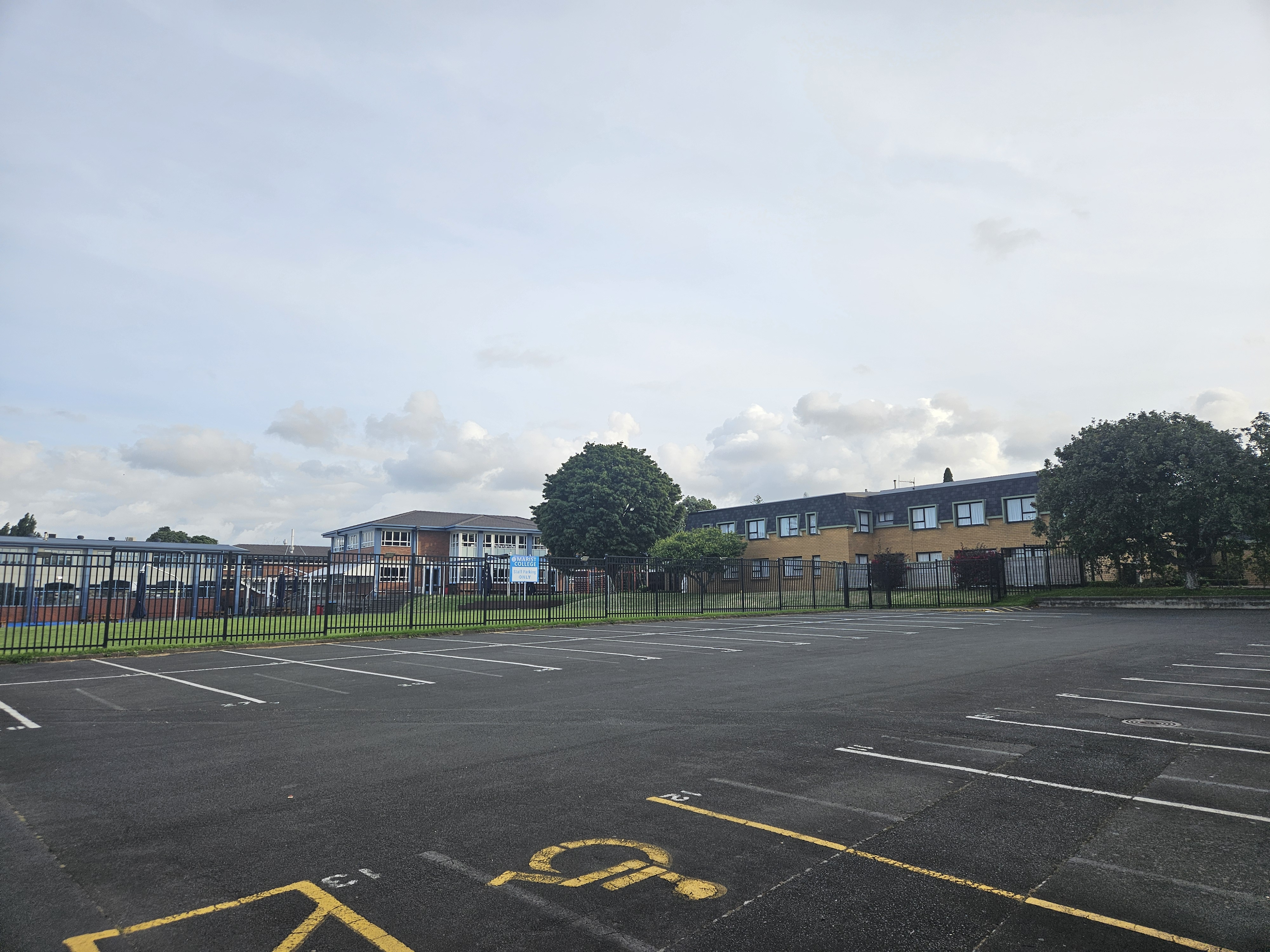

Location
- 31 Alberton Avenue, Mount Albert; Auckland; New Zealand; 36.8817°S 174.7257°E

Information
- Type: State integrated
- Motto: Latin: Ad Jesum per Mariam "To Jesus through Mary"
- Religious affiliation: Roman Catholic
- Established: 1928; 98 years ago
- Ministry of Education Institution no.: 70
- Principal: Raechelle Taulu
- Years: 7–13
- Gender: Girls
- Enrolment: 766
- Socio-economic decile: 7O
- Website: maristcollege.school.nz

Marist College (originally called Marist Sisters College) is an integrated Catholic girls high school located in Mount Albert, Auckland, New Zealand. It teaches from year 7 through to year 13 with an education "founded on the Catholic faith", and as of 2019 had a student roll of 760.

== History ==
Marist College was established as small private girls' school in 1928. It was founded by the Marist Sisters, a congregation or order of Roman Catholic women started in France during the early 19th century by Jeanne-Marie Chavoin and Jean-Claude Colin. The college was initially called Marist Convent High School, later becoming Marist Sisters' College and finally Marist College in 1996.

Marist College began a year after a primary school was established in Mt. Albert Parish, and between 1928 and 1936 was a boarding school which initially included primary age students. The two pioneers were Mother Bernard (Mary Gorman) Irish woman and Sister Austin, an Australian. Sr. Alexius arrived New Zealand in February 1928 to teach in the secondary school and official registration was obtained in 1947.

In 1945, Colin House (named after Jean-Claude Colin) was constructed, allowing the school to greatly expand. By 1955 there were 93 students at Marist College, then in 1981 after integration into the State system this had grown to a cap of 411, then by 2010 this cap had grown to 750.

The boarding school closed in 1978 due to a lack of staff, and the College was gifted by the Marist Sisters of New Zealand to the Roman Catholic Bishop of Auckland in 2001.

In 1981, the school became an integrated school in New Zealand's schooling system.

A large cluster of COVID-19 cases were associated with Marist College during the early days of the COVID-19 pandemic in New Zealand in 2020.

=== Black Lives Matter ===
In June 2020, teachers at Marist College took down some of the posters placed by students to promote the Black Lives Matter movement. The school's student cultural leader quit in protest, saying that the college had a systemic problem with racism. Other students joined the protests against systemic racism. In a statement, the school's principal, Raechelle Taulu, said that the school was aware of the students' concerns "about racism in our society and in the world" that the school rejects actions and attitudes that are racist and violent, and that it was "reviewing the issues raised". In a school assembly recorded by a student without her consent, Taulu said that while the cause was "amazing", the actions of some students was "non-Catholic", and said that she felt the student had defamed her character. The Catholic Diocese of Auckland, which owns Marist College, said it would mediate a meeting with students who have raised issues.

On 16 June, 30 students staged a peaceful protest against alleged "systematic racism" at Marist College.

== Enrolment ==
As of July 2026, the school has a roll of 766 students, of which 67 (8.7%) identify as Māori.

As of 2026, the school has an Equity Index of 398, placing it amongst schools whose students have the fewest socioeconomic barriers to achievement (roughly equivalent to deciles 9 and 10 under the former socio-economic decile system).

== Operation and events ==
Marist College has daily prayers, regular celebrations of the sacrament of the Eucharist and formal study of a religious education programme.

Each year, Marist College celebrates Marist Day, starting with Mass in the morning and a themed fun time after that. It is always on 15 August, the Feast of the Assumption of Mary. In 2008, it celebrated Marist Day's 30th Anniversary, which started in 1978.

Every year, Marist College holds Family Festival, a festival for numerous cultures dances, many foods and cultural activities.

For year 7 and 8, a social is held either at Marist College, St Peters College, etc around October. The social includes dancing and formality.

According to the school, the school has four houses, named after significant members of the Marist Story:

Name	Colour	Named after
Chavoin	Red	Jeanne-Marie Chavoin (1786–1858), founded the Marist Sisters with Jean-Claude Colin
Chanel	Yellow	St Peter Chanel (1803–1841), a Marist priest who, as a missionary in Futuna was martyred in 1841
Colin	Green	Father Jean-Claude Colin (1790–1875), the founder of the Marist family
Champagnat	Blue	St Marcellin Champagnat (1789–1840), a Marist priest who founded the Marist Brothers

In 2019, the school had the following ethnic makeup: NZ European/Pākehā 40%, Māori 10%, Indian 10%, Samoan 10%, South East Asian 8%, Tongan 8%, Chinese 5%, other Pacific groups 5%, other ethnic groups 4%.

=== Mathematics ===
Metro Magazine 2021 ranked Marist College as Auckland’s top performing school in Mathematics Level 1. Marist College was ranked in the top 10 out of 98 schools in Science, English & Communications, and Social Sciences.

=== Science ===
In 2021, Marist College Science department junior programme was published by Te Ihuwaka / Education Evaluation Centre (ERO) as a best practice school. The report “Growing Curiosity, Teaching strategies to engage years 5-11 students in science” shares teaching approaches and strategies that ERO has identified as being highly engaging and successful in ensuring student achievement. Marist College was the only Auckland Secondary School selected to be published in this research.

== Notable alumnae ==
- Lucy Lawless, an actress noted for her work as Xena in the television series Xena: Warrior Princess
- Agnes Loheni, a member of parliament for the National Party;
