= A. M. Woodbury =

A. M. Woodbury may refer to:

- Angus M. Woodbury (1886-1964), American biologist
- Austin Woodbury (1899-1979), Australian philosopher
