= Clair du Dauphiné =

Catholic French abbot

Saint Clair du Dauphiné
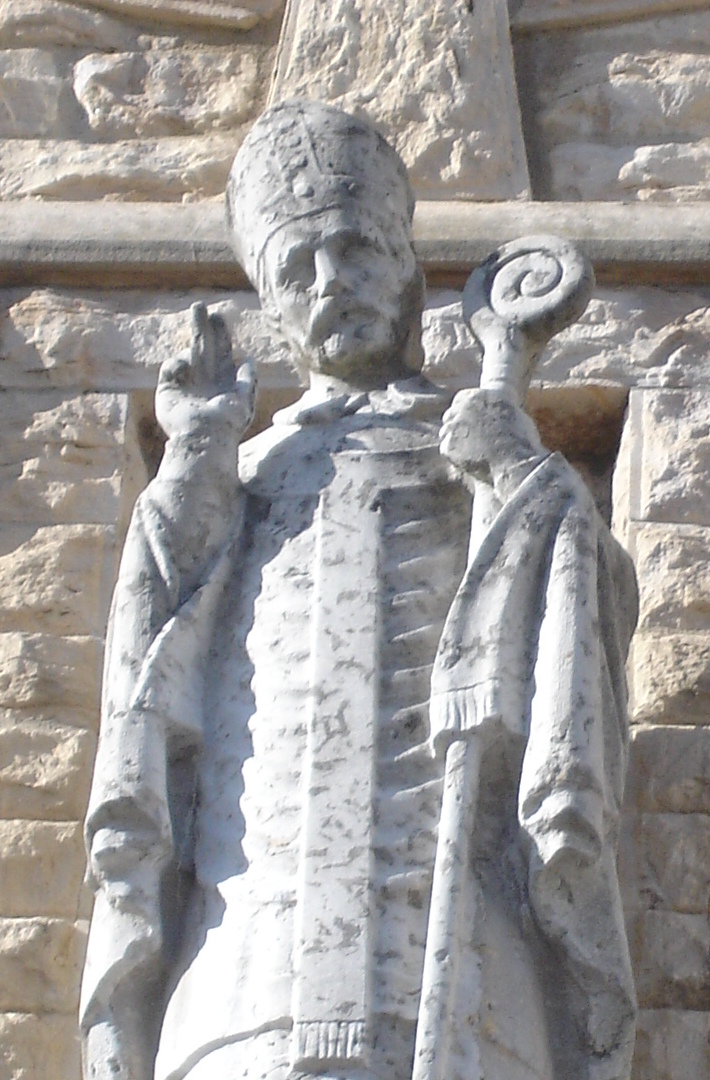
- The statue of Saint Clair on the pediment of the church of Caluire.

Abbot
- Born: Around 590. Saint-Clair-du-Rhône
- Died: 1 January 660; Vienna, France
- Venerated in: Catholic Church
- Feast: 1 January

Saint Clair of Dauphiné, also known as St. Clair of Vienne, was a Catholic abbot who "bequeathed to monasticism an example of religious excellence". He was born about 590 in Saint-Clair-du-Rhône and died in 660 in Vienne, France. His liturgical memorial is celebrated on January 1 in the Roman Martyrology.

== Biography ==
St. Clair was born around 590 in the village of Beauchamp (later renamed Saint-Clair-du-Rhône in his memory). He was raised first by his widowed mother and then by the monks of Saint-Ferréol when his mother decided to retire to the cloistered convent of Sainte-Blandine.

St. Clair decided to enter the monastery of Saint-Ferréol-Trente-Pas, one of the most important monasteries of the time (it had four hundred monks at that time), to dedicate himself to God.

He was considered outstanding, so much so that Bishop Caldéolde decided to appoint him abbot of the Saint-Marcel monastery (which had thirty monks at the time) and chaplain of the Saint-Blandine monastery (where his mother had retired).

According to Christian tradition, he was noted for his prophetic gifts and miraculous healing abilities.

He died around 660 and was buried in the church of Sainte-Blandine, next to the martyrs of Lyon.

Most of his relics were destroyed during the French Wars of Religion (1562–1598).

== Devotion and patronage ==
Saint Clair is the patron saint of woodworkers, glassmakers, and spectacle makers. He is invoked as a healing saint for the eyes, in particular, to "protect the eyes and cure eye diseases". From this reputation derives the punning French expression "Saint Clair qui fait voir clair" ("Saint Clair who makes you see clearly")

According to Arnold van Gennep, Saint Clair is also the patron saint of stonemasons ("who are in constant danger of being blinded by splinters and dust").

His relics were kept and venerated mainly in Lyon, but also in the Savoyard parishes of Dingy-Saint-Clair, Cons-Sainte-Colombe, Aix-les-Bains, Saint-Simon, Les Échelles of Saint-Alban, Bramans, and Yvoire, until their destruction during the French Wars of Religion.

In the commune of Dingy-Saint-Clair, where a relic of Saint Clair was kept, a pilgrimage for eye diseases was held until the destruction of the priory (partly during the French Revolution when the buildings were confiscated and sold as national property and burned).

The Catholic Church celebrates Saint Clair on 1 January. Locally, he is celebrated in Geneva and Savoy on 2 January. The diocese of Grenoble (formerly Dauphiné) celebrates him on 3 January.

== See also ==
=== Bibliography ===
- Blanc, Marius (1898). La vie et le culte de Saint-Clair, Abbé de Saint-Marcel de Vienne en Dauphiné (in French). Vol. 2. Toulon: Impr. Catholique.
- Maréchal, Jean-Robert (2008). Les Saints Patrons protecteurs (in French). Cheminements. ISBN 978-2844785800.
- Van Gennep, Arnold (1924). "Le culte populaire de saint Clair et saint Blaise en Savoie". Revue d'ethnographie et des traditions populaires (in French). 5: 136 and following.
- Devos, Roger; Joisten, Charles (1978). Mœurs et coutumes de la Savoie du Nord au xixe siècle : L'enquête de Mgr Rendu (in French). Centre alpin et rhodanien d'ethnologie. ISBN 978-2-901102-01-4.
- Baudoin, Jacques (2006). Grand livre des saints : culte et iconographie en Occident (in French). CREER. ISBN 978-2848190419.
- Burlet, Joseph (1922). Le culte de Dieu, de la Sainte Vierge et des saints en Savoie avant la Révolution : essai de géographie hagiologique (in French). Imprimerie réunies de Chambéry.

=== External links ===
- Religion resource: GCatholic.org
