= Society of Mary (Marists) =

Roman Catholic religious institute

- Societas Mariæ (Latin)
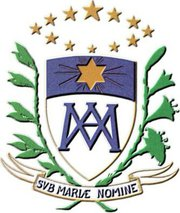
- Abbreviation: S.M.
- Nickname: Marist
- Formation: 29 April 1836; 190 years ago
- Founder: Fr. Jean-Claude Colin
- Founded at: Lyon, France
- Type: Catholic religious congregation
- Location(s): General Motherhouse; Villa S. Maria, Via Alessandro Poerio 63, 00152, Rome, Italy
- Region served: Worldwide
- Motto: Latin: Sub Mariae Nomine; English: Under Mary's Name
- Superior General: Fr Declan Marmion sm
- Main organ: SMbulletin
- Parent organization: Catholic Church
- Website: https://maristfathers.net/

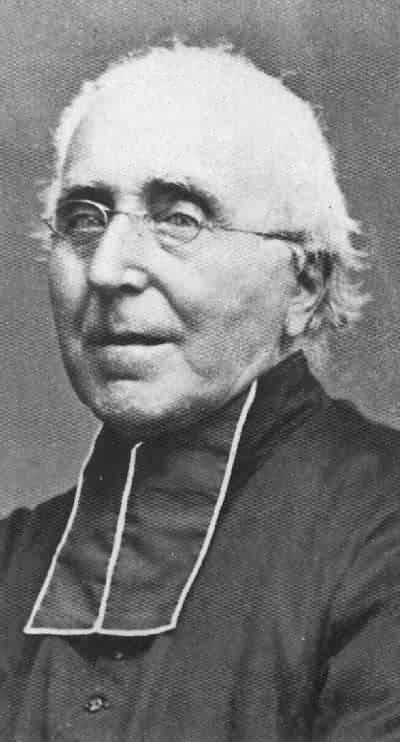
Venerable Jean-Claude Colin, founder of the Society of Mary

The Society of Mary (Latin: Societas Mariæ), better known as the Marists, is a Catholic religious congregation of pontifical right. Founded in Cerdon, France, by Jean-Claude Colin, the Society of Mary was recognized by an apostolic brief on April 29, 1836, and is made up of several branches (fathers, brothers, sisters, third order).

== The five Marist branches ==
The Society of Mary is a religious congregation. This congregation is made up of five branches. Although all members of the Society of Mary, each of the five branches is independent of one another.

=== The "Marist Fathers" ===
The "Marist Fathers" were founded by Jean-Claude Colin and approved by Rome on April 29, 1836 (at the same time as the Society of Mary itself). These are religious who have received priestly ordination (they are both religious and priests). Marist fathers live in community. These are educators and missionaries. Their mission is to announce the gospel and celebrate the sacraments. They exercise their priestly ministries in Marist schools, hospitals, etc. The superior of Marist fathers is also the superior of the entire Society of Mary.

=== The "Marist Brothers" ===
The "Marist Brothers" were founded by Marcellin Champagnat on January 2, 1817. It was integrated into the Society of Mary on April 22, 1842 and was approved by Rome in 1863. The Marist brothers are religious (but they are not priests, unlike the Marist fathers). Marist brothers live in community. Their mission is to help and educate young people with a particular intention for poor, marginalized or neglected children. They mainly work where the economic and social situations are the most difficult (slums, orphanages, disadvantaged neighbourhoods, juvenile detention centers, etc.).

=== The "Marist Sisters" ===
The "Marist Sisters" were founded by Jeanne-Marie Chavoin on December 8, 1824. They are contemplative and apostolic nuns (parish animation, distribution of communion to the sick, catechumenate, youth ministry, etc.). They wear a blue veil.

=== The "Missionary Sisters of the Society of Mary" ===
The "Missionary Sisters of the Society of Mary" were founded by Marie-Françoise Perroton and approved by Rome on December 30, 1931. They are missionary nuns. Their mission is to "stay close to people in simplicity", to live and announce the gospel through apostolic service. They work with those left behind, with particular concern for women and children. They wear a white veil and a medal of the Immaculate Conception

=== The "Third Order of Mary" ===
The "Third Order of Mary" is open to all: lay or religious, wishing to work for their spiritual advancement and to associate with the Society of Mary. Founded by Jean-Claude Colin, it was however Pierre-Julien Eymard who organized it, developed it, wrote its rules and obtained its approval by Rome on December 5, 1850. The third order aims to be a school of perfection. The best known member of the Marist Third Order is Jean-Marie Vianney, who joined it on December 8, 1846.

== Spirituality ==
Marists present their spirituality and their way of living through a series of expressions, images and symbols.

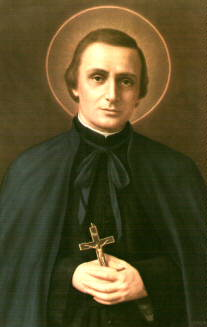
Saint Peter Chanel, patron saint of Oceania.

"Hidden and unknown": For Marists, being more or less "hidden and unknown" in the world, is a call to simple, modest and humble action. The focus on the task rather than who is doing it. For Fr Colin, the founder of the Society of Mary, being, "hidden and unknown" was the only way to do good.

"The Three Marist No's": No to greed; no to pride; no to power" : Greed, power and pride limit the effectiveness of those who wish to present the Gospel of Jesus. Marists are invited to follow in Mary’s footsteps keeping their eyes fixed on God alone and on the kingdom, resisting the crippling forces of greed, power and pride so as to develop an inner freedom, and in the manner of Mary, build a Christian community which has Mary’s face.

"The three violets": Humility, simplicity and modesty": spiritual attitudes. Marists must approach everyone in the same way as they approach God; "with an apron, a basin and a towel. To love and serve".

"Mary in the Early Church": Marist think of Mary in this group of believers at the beginning: with her faith and wisdom she had much to contribute to the life of the church, but in an unobtrusive manner.

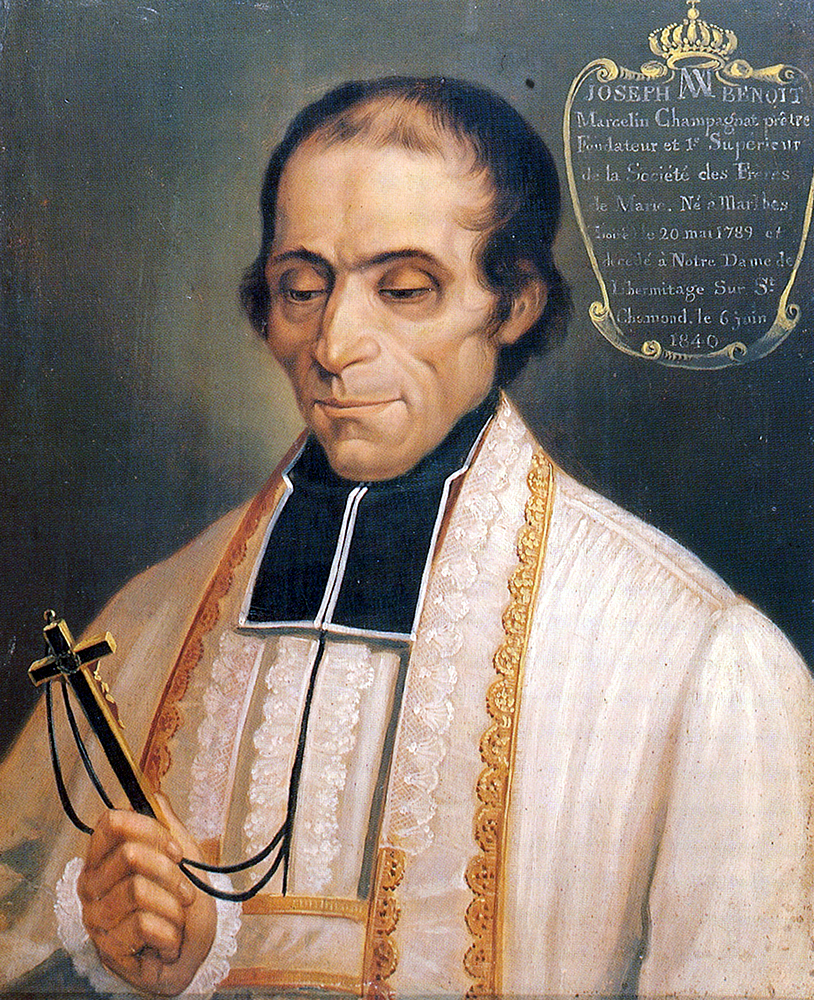
Saint Marcellin Champagnat founder of the Marist Brothers.

"Compassion": Marists consider that compassion must be expressed in actions. That it is through compassionate service that people will see Marists as disciples of Jesus and experience his love. Marists are invited to become "instruments of divine mercy".

The Marists are called to imitate Mary in this way of life and ministry. Colin said Marists must "think as Mary, judge as Mary, feel and act as Mary in all things."

Colin called the missionary and pastoral activity of the Marists the "Work of Mary". According to Marist tradition the Society of Mary as a whole and every individual Marist is called to be an "Instrument of Mercy" for all mankind. As Mary was a healing presence in the Early Church so the Marists want to be present in the Church of their days.

Marian maxim "I (Mary) was the mainstay of the new-born Church; I shall be again at the end of time" began to circulate. The early Marists saw themselves as the ones to live and minister under Mary's name. That was the core of the spiritual understanding of what they saw as their vocation.

== Notable Marists ==
- Marcellin Champagnat, canonized, founder Marist Brothers
- Peter Chanel, canonized, patron saint of Oceania
- Jeanne-Marie Chavoin, founder of the Marist Sisters
- Moisés Cisneros, canonization process opened in 2017, director of a Marist school in Guatemala
- Jean-Claude Colin, venerable, founder of the Society of Mary and the branch of the Marist fathers
- Peter Julian Eymard, canonized, founder of the Congregation of the Blessed Sacrament
- Antoine Marie Garin, canonization trial opened in 2016, missionary
- Paul Glynn, author of Song for Nagasaki.
- Andrew Kerin, founder of Celtic F.C.
- Bishop Joel Matthias Konzen, Auxiliary Bishop of the Roman Catholic Archdiocese of Atlanta and former Principal of Marist School
- Joche Albert Ly, martyr, teacher
- Marie-Françoise Perroton, first pioneer of the missionary Sisters of the Society of Mary
- Jean-Baptiste Pompallier, first vicar apostolic of New Zealand
- Basilio Rueda, process of canonization opened 2019
- Pio Taofinu'u, first Polynesian bishop and cardinal
- Henri Vergès (fr), beatified, one of the nineteen martyrs of Algeria
- Jean-Marie Vianney, canonized, patron saint of priests
- Austin Woodbury, philosopher and priest

== Historical ==
=== Today ===
Today the Society, with its Generalate in Rome, operates in five Provinces: Canada, Europe, New Zealand, Oceania, and USA, along with five mission districts: Africa (Senegal and Cameroun), South America (Brazil and Peru), Asia (The Philippines and Thailand), Australia and Mexico. The European Provinces, Districts, and Delegations (England, Ireland, France, Germany, Italy, the Netherlands, Spain and Norway) reconfigured in 2008 and formed the new European Province. The Provinces in the United States (Atlanta and Boston) became one Province (USA) on January 1, 2009. There are around 500 Marists worldwide.

=== Foundation ===
Colin was assigned after ordination to Cerdon where he was assistant to the pastor, his elder brother Pierre. There Jean-Claude Colin began drafting a tentative rule for the group of priests and with Jeanne-Marie Chavoin founded the Sisters of the Holy Name of Mary, later called Marist Sisters.

The reception from the ecclesiastical authorities in Lyon was decidedly cool since the diocese was afraid of losing priests from its control, given the dramatic local needs. For this reason, little progress could be made toward the foundation of the priests' branch as a religious congregation until Cerdon, Colin's parish, passed from the jurisdiction of Lyon Diocese to a revived diocese of Belley.

In 1823, Bishop Devie of Belley authorised Colin and a few companions to resign their parish duties and form into a travelling missionary band for the rural districts. Their zeal and success in that difficult work moved the bishop to entrust them also with the conduct of his minor seminary, thus enlarging the scope of their work. However, little progress could be made toward the foundation of a true religious congregation, since like the Lyons authorities, Bishop Devie wanted at most a diocesan institute only, while Fr. Colin was averse to such a limitation. This came near placing the nascent institute in jeopardy.

From its definitive organisation the Society of Mary developed in and out of France, along the various lines of its constitutions . In France it did mission work in various centres. When educational liberty was restored to French Catholics, it also entered the field of secondary or "college" education, its methods being embodied in Montfat's "Théorie et pratique de l'education chrétienne" (Paris, 1880). It also assumed the direction of a few diocesan seminaries together with professorships in Catholic universities. The French province also supplied men for the various missions undertaken abroad by the Society of Mary.

Outside France, the first field of labour was the Vicariate Apostolic of Western Oceania, comprising New Zealand, Tonga, Samoa, the Gilbert (now known as Kiribati) and Marshall Islands, Fiji, New Caledonia, New Guinea, the Solomon and the Caroline Islands. Under vicar apostolic Bishop Jean Baptiste Pompallier who took up residence in New Zealand, the Marists successively moved to Wallis in 1837, soon converted by Father Pierre Bataillon; Futuna in 1837, the place of Saint Pierre Chanel's martyrdom; Tonga in 1842; New Caledonia in 1843, where Bishop Douarre, Pompallier's coadjutor, met untold difficulties and Brother Blaise Marmoiton was martyred; and, in spite of much Protestant opposition, Fiji in 1844 and Samoa in 1845. The immense area of the vicariate, together with the presence of a bishop from the diocesan clergy as its head, soon necessitated the creation of smaller districts, headed by Marist bishops: Central Oceania under Bishop Bataillon (1842), Melanesia and Micronesia under Bishop Epalle (1844), New Caledonia under Bishop Douarre (1847), and Wellington (New Zealand) under Bishop Viard (1848). Bishop Pompallier retained Auckland and the Navigator Islands (1851), long administered by the Vicar Apostolic of Central Oceania, along with the Prefecture of Fiji (1863). Of all these, Melanesia and Micronesia had to be abandoned after the murder of Bishop Epalle at Isabella Island and the sudden death of his successor, Bishop Colomb, the Solomon Islands alone reverting to the Marists in 1898. Those various missions have progressed steadily under the Marist Fathers who, besides their religious work, have largely contributed to make known the languages, fauna, and flora of the South Sea Islands. The growth of New Zealand was such as to call for a regular hierarchy, and the Marists were concentrated (1887) in the Archdiocese of Wellington and Diocese of Christchurch that were still governed by members of the institute. In Australia they established a base at Hunters Hill in Sydney which supported missionary activity.

In Great Britain, the Marist foundations began as early as 1850 at the request of Nicholas Cardinal Wiseman, Archbishop of Westminster, but have not grown beyond three colleges and five parishes. In the United States, the Society of Mary took a firmer hold. From Louisiana, whither Archbishop Odin called them in 1863 to take charge of a French parish and college, the Marists passed into eleven states and branched off into Mexico, and, although continuing to minister to a number of French speaking communities, did not limit their action there but took up other ministries and apostolates. They operate the Lourdes Center in Boston, Massachusetts, established in 1950 by Richard Cardinal Cushing and Bishop Pierre-Marie Theas to distribute Lourdes water in the United States.

By the beginning of the 19th century Christian churches were well established in the Americas, Europe, and Australia. Christian evangelization efforts turned to Africa, Asia, and Oceania. The Holy See, keen to establish the Catholic faith in this area, entrusted its evangelization efforts of Oceania to the Congregation of the Sacred Hearts of Jesus and Mary (Picpus Fathers). Subsequently the territory was divided, so that the Holy See assigned a Vicariate Apostolic of Eastern Oceania (including Tahiti, the Marquesas, and Hawaii) to the Picpus Fathers, and established a Vicariate Apostolic of Western Oceania (including Micronesia, Melanesia, Fiji, New Zealand, Samoa, and Tonga) which was assigned to the Society of Mary (Marists).

It was as a result of some preliminary contacts with Rome that this missionary task was proposed to the Marists, and upon their acceptance Pope Gregory XVI, by a Brief of April 29, 1836, formally approved the "Priests of the Society of Mary" or Marist Fathers as a religious institute with simple vows and under a Superior General. The Little Brothers of Mary and the Sisters of the Holy Name of Mary, commonly called Marist Brothers and Marist Sisters, were not included but were to be separate institutes. Father Colin was elected Superior General on September 24, 1836, and on that same day the first Marist religious professions took place. Along with Colin the first professed included two who would become saints: Saint Peter Chanel, S.M., martyred on the island of Futuna, and Saint Marcellin Champagnat, S.M., founder of the Marist Brothers.
