= Marist Sisters =

International order Roman Catholic nuns, founded 1824

The Marist Sisters are an international congregation or order of Roman Catholic women. They are part of the Society of Mary (Marists). The Marist Sisters recognise Jeanne-Marie Chavoin (Mother Saint Joseph) as their Foundress and Jean-Claude Colin as their Founder.

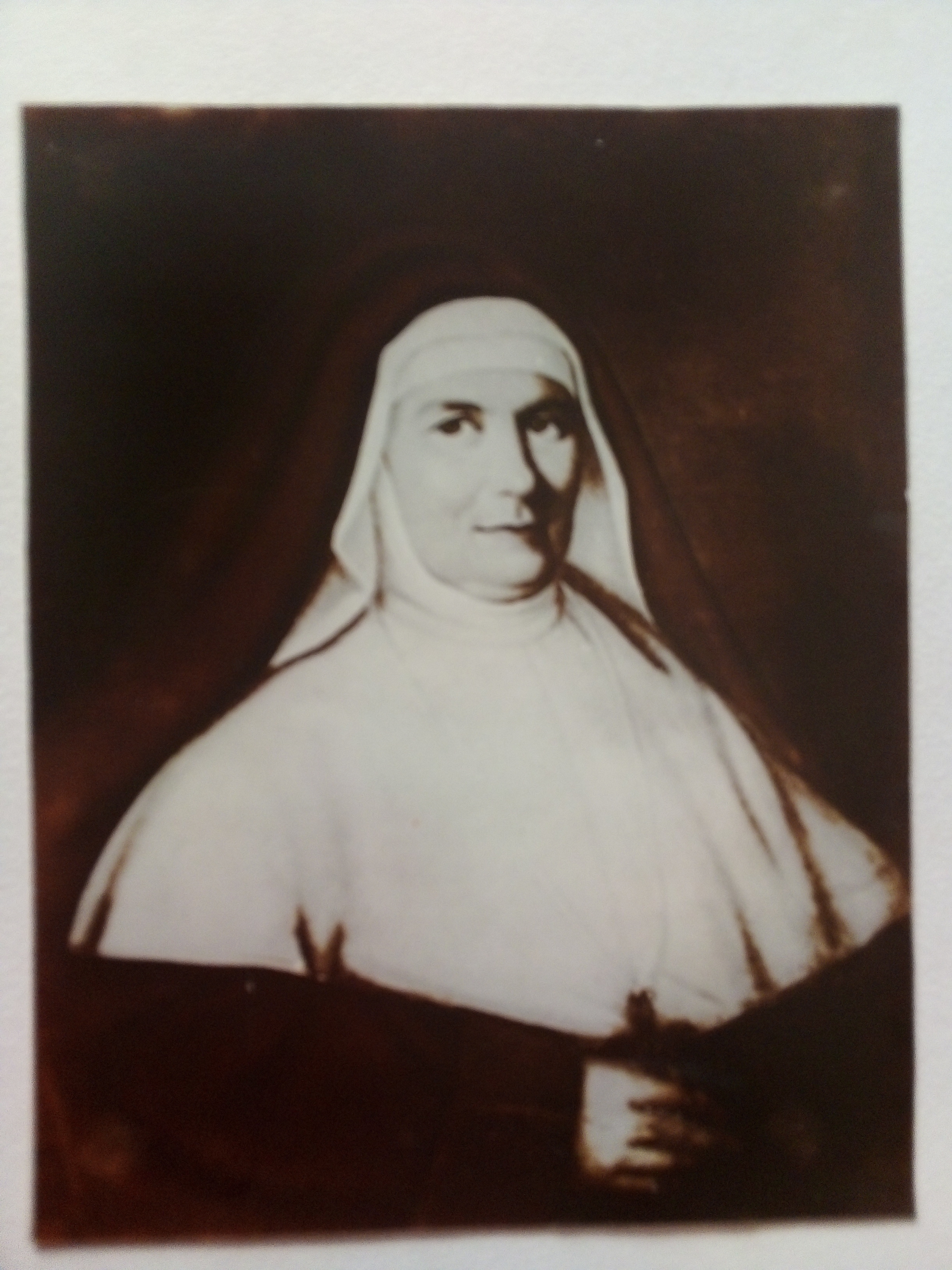
Mother Saint Joseph, Founder of The Marist Sisters

== Early life of Mother Saint Joseph ==
Jeanne-Marie was born in the village of Coutouvre in France on 29 August 1786, and was baptised in the church on the same day. Jeanne-Marie grew up with little formal education, but developed a deep faith. She supported others in the village. She was invited several times to enter different religious orders, but always refused, certain that God was not calling her to these. Finally in 1817, when she was 31 years old, she received a letter from Fr Pierre Colin, brother of Jean-Claude Colin, who had once been parish priest in Coutouvre, inviting her to Cerdon, Ain to take part in the Marist project. She felt that this was where God was calling her, and went to Cerdon with her friend Marie Jotillon.

== The Marist Sisters of Cerdon ==
Chavoin stayed at Cerdon for 6 years, for four of which she was housekeeper at the clergy house. She worked with the Colin brothers in shaping the future Society of Mary (Marists), described as the "Work of Mary". In 1823, Marie Jotillon, her niece, Marie Gardet and Jeanne-Marie Chavoin began to live together in community in Cerdon. The first three Marist Sisters lived in poverty, but, despite this, many young women of the town asked to join them. Eight future Marist Sisters received the habit on 8 December 1824. Soon after they were invited by Bishop Devie to go to Belley where the first profession of faith took place on 6 September 1826.

Jeanne-Marie, or Mother Saint Joseph as she was now called, was Superior General of the new Congregation until 1853, when she was asked to resign.

Chauvoin and Colin disagreed about whether the Sisters should remain part of the Society of Mary. Colin wanted them to be an independent congregation of pontifical right, and to change their name. Chauvoin refused. The Sisters retained their name, but did become a congregation of pontifical right.

At the age of 69 Chauvoin began a new foundation in Jarnosse, an abandoned village which was poor in every way. She died at Jarnosse on 30 June 1858 at the age of 71.

== Marist Sisters in Great Britain ==
The first foundation of the Marist Sisters outside France began in Spitalfields, a socially and spiritually deprived area in the East End of London, in 1858. Five Sisters formed the pioneer community and although their main work was teaching, faithful to the founding charism, they soon involved themselves "where the needs were greatest". This involved parish visiting, running soup kitchens and work with orphaned children. Other foundations followed and in addition to the work of education in both the State and Independent sectors, a variety of additional ministries focusing on the needs of the time were undertaken.

== Present distribution of the order ==
Missionary Sisters of the Society of Mary are engaged in missionary activity in twenty four countries of the Pacific, Africa, Asia, Europe, North America and South America. These countries include Australia, Brazil, Canada, England, Fiji, France, Ireland, Italy, Mexico, New Zealand, Senegal, The Gambia, The Philippines, United States and Venezuela serving the many needs of people.

== See also ==
- Society of Mary (Marists)
