= Kolisi o Sagata Maria =

Catholic girls' school in Apia, Samoa

Coordinates: 13.8409°S 171.7806°W

Kolisi o Sagata Maria, also called St Mary's College, is a girls' high school operated by the Missionary Sisters of the Society of Mary (SMSM) in Vaimoso, Apia, the capital of Samoa.
