= Coutouvre =

- Commune
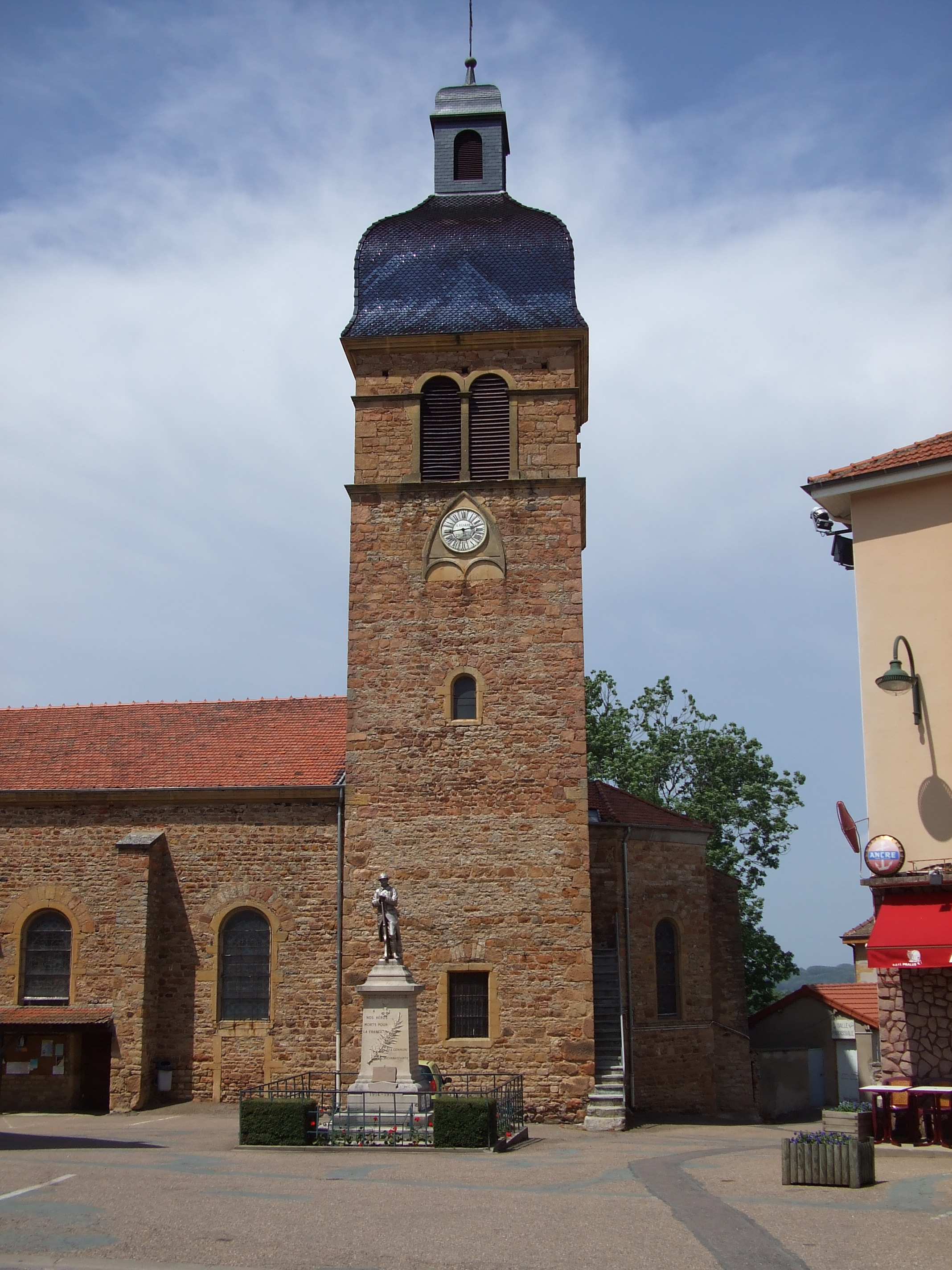
- Location of Coutouvre
- Location within France Location within Auvergne-Rhône-Alpes
- Coordinates: 46°04′24″N 4°12′45″E
- Country: France
- Region: Auvergne-Rhône-Alpes
- Department: Loire
- Arrondissement: Roanne
- Canton: Charlieu
- Intercommunality: Roannais Agglomération

Government
  - Mayor (2020–2026): Laurence Boyer
- Area^{1}: 21.87 km^{2} (8.44 sq mi)
- Elevation: 450 m (1,480 ft)
- Highest elevation: 538 m (1,765 ft)
- Lowest elevation: 303 m (994 ft)
- Population (2023): 1,085
  - Density: 49.61/km^{2} (128.5/sq mi)
- Time zone: UTC+01:00 (CET)
  - Summer (DST): UTC+02:00 (CEST)
- INSEE/Postal code: 42074 /42460
- ^{1} French Land Register data, which excludes lakes, ponds, glaciers > 1 km^{2} (0.386 sq mi or 247 acres) and river estuaries.

Coutouvre (French pronunciation: [kutuvʁ]) is a commune in the Loire department in central France.

It lies about 90 km (56 mi) northwest of Lyon.

== Population ==
Historical population
Year	Pop.	±% p.a.
1968	892	—
1975	1,011	+1.81%
1982	1,084	+1.00%
1990	1,052	−0.37%
1999	1,024	−0.30%
2007	1,106	+0.97%
2012	1,105	−0.02%
2017	1,101	−0.07%
2023	1,085	−0.24%
Source: INSEE

== Personalities ==
Coutouvre was the birthplace of:

- Jeanne-Marie Chavoin (1786-1818), co-founder of the Marist Sisters
- Claude Marie Dubuis (1817-1895), Catholic prelate
- Louis Mercier (1820-1875), translator of Jules Verne

== See also ==
- Communes of the Loire department
