= Missionary Sisters of the Society of Mary =

Roman Catholic congregation

The Missionary Sisters of the Society of Mary (SMSM) are a congregation of pontifical right of Catholic religious women. They are part of the Marist family of congregations. The order is dedicated to evangelization. In its missionary activity it is within the ambit of the Congregation for the Evangelization of Peoples in Rome.

== History ==
The founders of the congregation were eleven lay-women who left France from the early nineteenth century to assist in the missions established by the Marist Fathers in the South Pacific. The first of those 11 women was Marie-Françoise Perroton (1796 - 1873) who went to the mission on Wallis Island in 1846. Alone during 12 years, she ministered especially to the women and children of the island.

Between 1857 and 1862 ten more missionaries arrived in Oceania to help Perroton. They were all members of the "Third Order of Mary". They had a Rule, based on that of the Marist Fathers; a habit, a vow of obedience to the local Bishop, and were called "Sister", but not an official community of religious sisters. In 1881 the members took vows as religious and were established as a diocesan congregation, Sisters of the Third Order Regular of Mary (TORM). That same year, two novitiates were established; one in Saint-Brieuc, France, and one on Wallis.

The Sisters became very active in the Pacific. By 1931 they were staffing a hospital for leprosy on Makogai Island in Fiji. They were also working in missions in Bougainville Island and South Solomon Islands, New Hebrides, New Caledonia, Tonga, Samoa and Wallis and Futuna. They later extended their ministry to New Zealand, and Boston, Massachusetts, USA as well as, Algeria, Senegal, Mauritania, Burundi, Rwanda, Bangladesh, Madagascar, Philippines, Germany, Tanzania and England. In 1931 the Sisters were reorganized into a Congregation of Pontifical Right. and given the new name of Missionary Sisters of the Society of Mary.

== Today ==
As of 2020, there are about 400 Missionary Sisters of the Society of Mary working in twenty-three countries mostly in the areas of education and religious communication.

The Province of South Pacific is made up of the five island countries of New Zealand, Tonga, Samoa, Fiji and the Philippines. In Suva, the capital of Fiji, sisters teach at the Training College and at the Pacific Regional Seminary.

The Region of the Americas includes Jamaica, Peru, and the United States.

== See also ==
- Kolisi o Sagata Maria

== Sources ==
- O'Meeghan S.M., Michael (2003). Steadfast in hope: The Story of the Catholic Archdiocese of Wellington 1850-2000. Wellington: Catholic Archdiocese of Wellington.
