= Bishops in the Catholic Church =

Ordained ministers of the Catholic Church

One form for the coat of arms of a Latin Catholic bishop

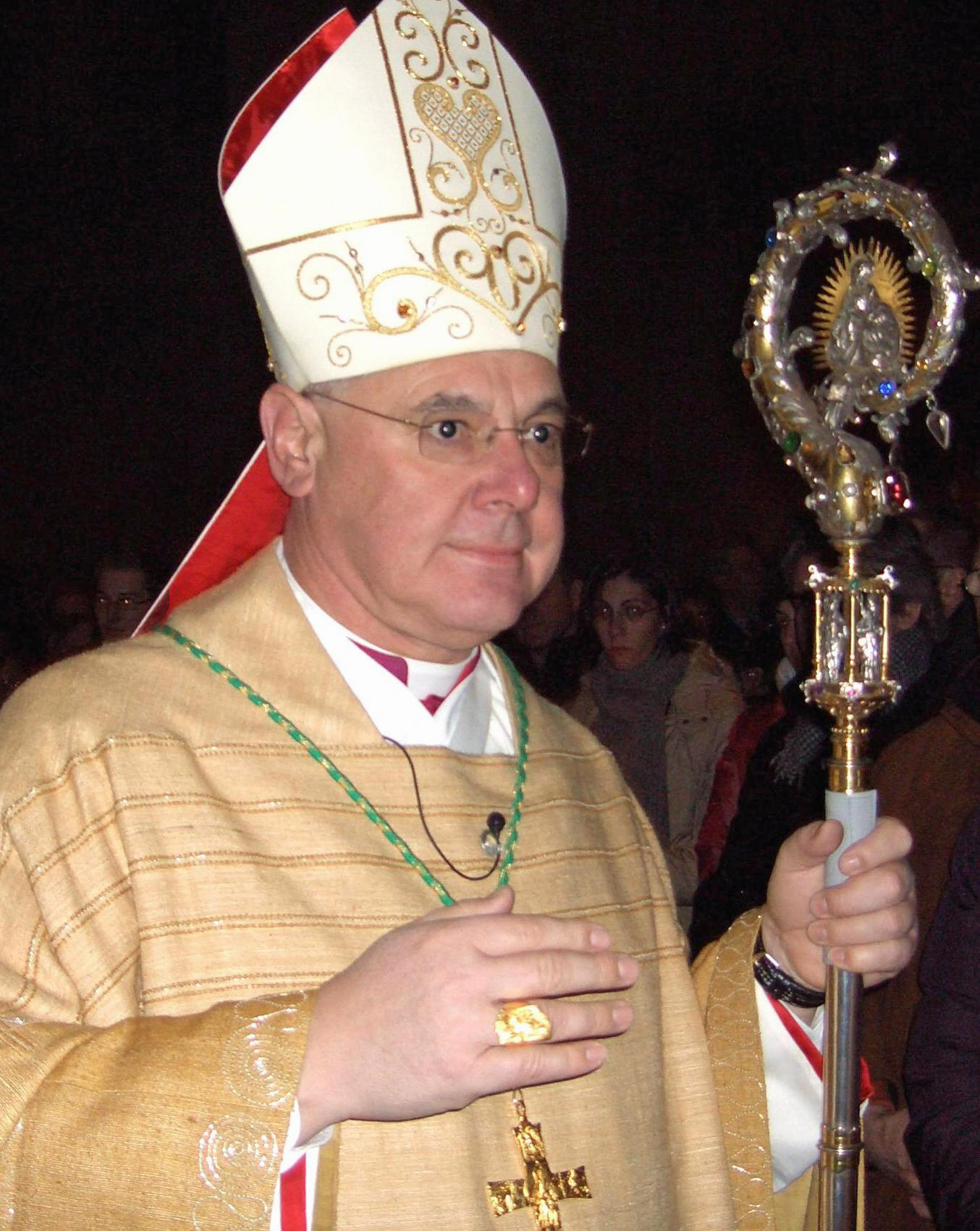
Latin Church Catholic bishop Gerhard Ludwig Müller wearing the pontifical vestments and carrying a crosier

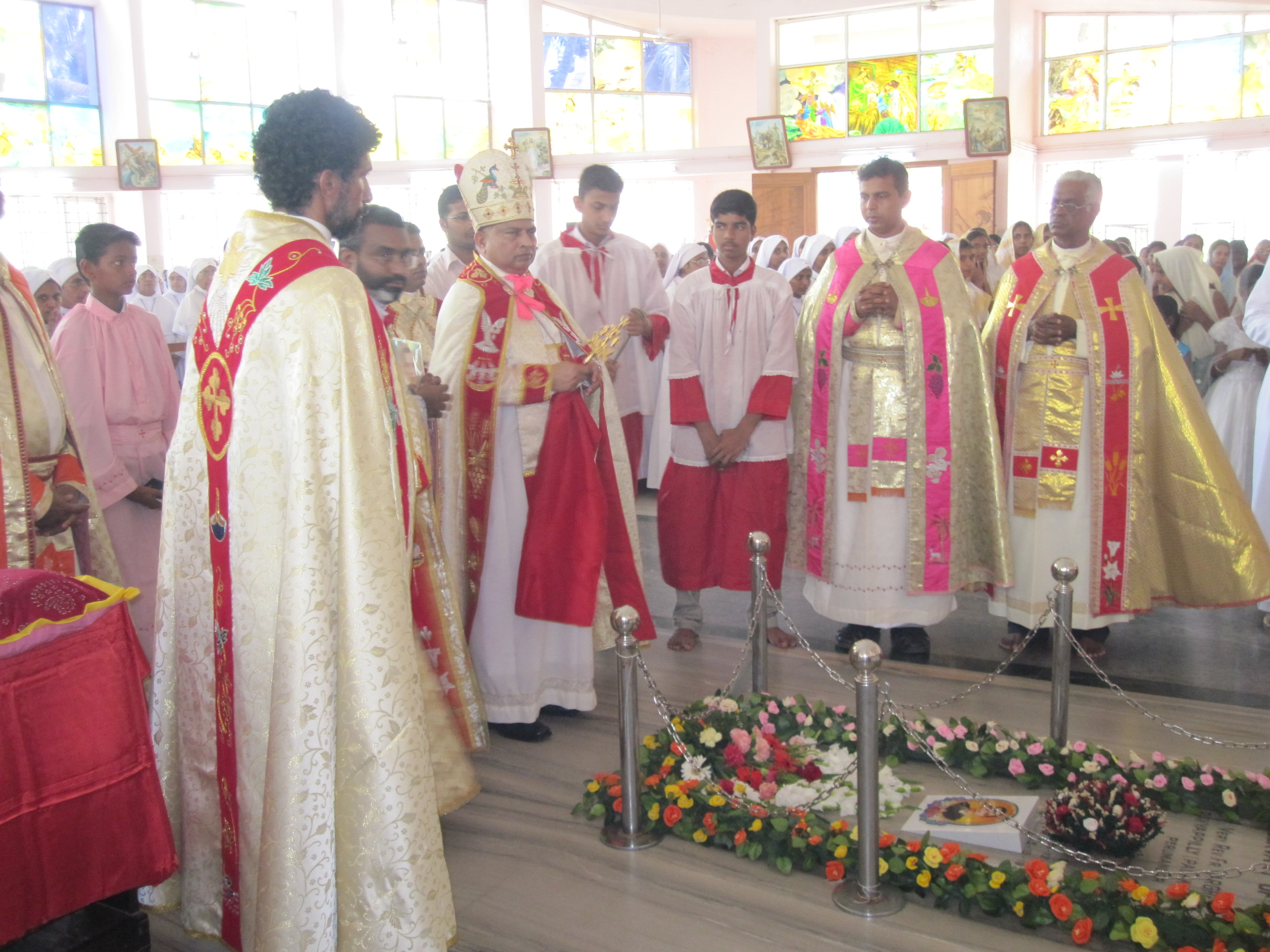
An Eastern Catholic bishop of the Syro-Malabar Church holding the Mar Thoma Cross which symbolizes the heritage and identity of the Syrian Church of Saint Thomas Christians of India

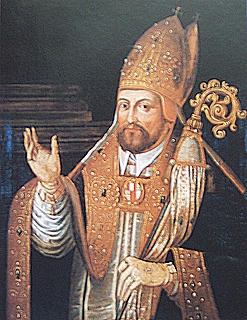
Johann Otto von Gemmingen, Prince-Bishop of Augsburg in Bavaria, 1591–1598, carrying a crosier and wearing a mitre and pluviale

In the Catholic Church, a bishop is an ordained minister who holds the fullness of the sacrament of holy orders and is responsible for teaching doctrine, governing Catholics in his jurisdiction, sanctifying the world and representing the church. Catholics trace the origins of the office of bishop to the apostles, who it is believed were endowed with a special charism and office by the Holy Spirit at Pentecost. Catholics believe this special charism and office has been transmitted through an unbroken succession of bishops by the laying on of hands in the sacrament of holy orders. Bishops are members of a singular church-wide episcopal body by virtue of both their sacramental consecration and their remaining in hierarchical communion with the Pope and other bishops.

The Second Vatican Council's Decree concerning the Pastoral Office of Bishops in the Church, promulgated on 28 October 1965, was devoted to outlining the Church's teaching on Bishops and their pastoral role.

== Canon law ==
Bishops are always men. In addition, canon 180 of the Code of Canons of the Eastern Churches (Note: Canon 378 § 1 of the 1983 Code of Canon Law states almost the same requirements) states that a candidate for the Eastern episcopacy should:

1. demonstrate solid faith, good morals, piety, zeal for souls and prudence;
2. enjoy a good reputation;
3. not be bound by a matrimonial bond;
4. be at least thirty-five years old;
5. ordained a presbyter for at least five years;
6. possess a doctorate or licentiate in some sacred science or at least be an expert in it.

Canon 378 § 2 of the 1983 Code of Canon Law goes on to clarify that "The definitive judgement on the suitability of the person to be promoted rests with the Apostolic See."

== Diocesan or eparchial bishops ==
Diocesan bishops (known as eparchial bishops in the Eastern Catholic Churches) are assigned to govern local regions within the Catholic Church known as dioceses in the Latin Church and eparchies in the Eastern Churches. Bishops are collectively known as the College of Bishops and can hold such additional titles as archbishop, cardinal, patriarch, or pope. As of 2020, there were approximately 5,600 living bishops total in the Latin and Eastern churches of the Catholic Church. The traditional role of a bishop is to act as head of a diocese or eparchy. Dioceses vary considerably in geographical size and population. A wide variety of dioceses around the Mediterranean Sea which received the Christian faith early are rather compact in size, while those in areas more recently evangelized, as in some parts of Sub-Saharan Africa, South America and the Far East, tend to be much larger and more populous. Within his own diocese a Latin Church bishop may use pontifical vestments and regalia, but may not do so in another diocese without, at least, the presumed consent of the appropriate ordinary.

=== Appointment ===
The appointment of bishops in the Catholic Church is a complicated process. Outgoing bishops, neighbouring bishops, the faithful, the apostolic nuncio, various members of the Roman Curia, and the pope all have a role in the selection. The exact process varies based upon a number of factors, including whether the bishop is from the Latin Church or one of the Eastern Catholic Churches, the geographic location of the diocese, what office the candidate is being chosen to fill, and whether the candidate has previously been ordained to the episcopate.

=== Resignation at 75 ===
Since the Second Vatican Council, diocesan bishops and their equivalents "who have become less capable of fulfilling their duties properly because of the increasing burden of age or some other serious reason" have been "earnestly requested to offer their resignation from office either at their own initiative or upon the invitation of the competent authority". The age of 75 was suggested for this, and John Paul II had these provisions incorporated in the Latin Church's new 1983 Code of Canon Law.

Article 401.1 of the 1983 Code of Canon Law states that "A diocesan Bishop who has completed his seventy-fifth year of age is requested to offer his resignation from office to the Supreme Pontiff, who, taking all the circumstances into account, will make provision accordingly". On 15 February 2018, Pope Francis established the same rule for non-cardinal bishops serving in the Roman Curia, who had previously lost their positions automatically at 75.

=== Roles ===
A "diocesan bishop" is entrusted with the care of a local Church (diocese). He is responsible for teaching, governing, and sanctifying the faithful of his diocese, sharing these duties with the priests and deacons who serve under him. The Second Vatican Council's Constitution on the Sacred Liturgy described the diocesan bishop as "the high priest of his flock".

To "teach, sanctify and govern" means that he must (1) oversee preaching of the Gospel and Catholic education in all its forms; (2) oversee and provide for the administration of the sacraments; and (3) legislate, administer and act as judge for canon-law matters within his diocese. He serves as the "chief shepherd" (spiritual leader) of the diocese and has responsibility for the pastoral care of all Catholics living within his ecclesiastical and ritual jurisdiction. He is obliged to celebrate Mass every Sunday and Holy Day of Obligation with the intention of praying for those in his care, assign clergy to their posts in various institutions and oversee finances. A bishop is to have a special concern for priests, listening to them, using them as counsellors, ensuring that they are adequately provided for in every way, and defending their rights set forth in the Code of Canon Law. Latin Catholic bishops also must make regular ad limina visits to the Holy See every five years.

Because of their function as teachers of the faith, it is customary in some English-speaking countries to add to the names of bishops the postnominal title of "D.D." (Doctor of Divinity) and to refer to and address them as "Doctor".

Only a bishop has authority to confer the sacrament of holy orders. In the Latin Church the minor orders were abolished after the Second Vatican Council. In Eastern Catholic Churches, a monastic archimandrite may tonsure and institute his subjects to minor orders; however, the tonsure and minor orders are not considered to be part of the sacrament of holy orders.

The sacrament of Confirmation is normally administered by a bishop in the Latin Church, but a bishop may delegate the administration to a priest. In the case of receiving an adult into full communion with the Catholic Church, the presiding priest will administer Confirmation. In the Eastern Catholic Churches, Confirmation (called Chrismation) is normally administered by priests as it is given at the same time as baptism. It is only within the power of the diocesan or eparchial bishop to bless churches and altars, although he may delegate another bishop, or even a priest, to perform the ceremony.

On Holy Thursday, Latin Catholic bishops preside over the Mass of the Chrism. In some cases this celebration takes place on the preceding Wednesday. Although Oil of the Sick for the sacrament of Anointing of the Sick is blessed at this Mass, it may also be blessed by any priest in case of necessity. Only a bishop may consecrate Chrism. In the Eastern Catholic Churches chrism is consecrated solely by heads of churches sui juris (patriarchs and metropolitans) and diocesan bishops may not do so.

Only a bishop or other ordinary may grant nihil obstats for theological books, certifying that they are free from doctrinal or moral error; this is an expression of the teaching authority and educational responsibility of the bishop.

Prior to the Second Vatican Council, it was also the prerogative of the bishop to consecrate the paten and chalice that would be used during the Mass. One of the changes implemented since the council, is that a simple blessing is now said, and it may be given by any priest.

=== Canonical authority ===
In both Western and Eastern Catholic churches, any priest can celebrate the Mass or Divine Liturgy. In order to offer Mass or Divine Liturgy publicly, however, a priest is required to have permission from the local Ordinary—authority for this permission may be given to pastors of parishes for a limited period, but for long-term permission recourse to the diocesan bishop is usually required. A celebret may be issued to travelling priests so that they can demonstrate to pastors and bishops outside of their own diocese that they are in good standing. However, even if a priest does not possess such a document, he may celebrate the sacraments if the local bishop or pastor judges that the visiting priest is a person of good character.

In the East an antimension signed by the bishop is kept on the altar partly as a reminder of whose altar it is and under whose omophorion the priest at a local parish is serving.

In the Western Catholic church's view of bishops' powers, the "power which they exercise personally in the name of Christ, is proper, ordinary, and immediate, although its exercise is ultimately controlled by the supreme authority of the Church," as per Lumen Gentium 27.

For priests to validly celebrate the sacrament of Penance they must have faculties (permission and authority) from the local bishop; however, when the penitent is in danger of death, a priest has both the right and obligation to hear the confession no matter where he may be.

To preside at matrimony ceremonies, Latin Church priests and deacons must have appropriate jurisdiction or delegation from a competent authority. In the Latin branch of the Catholic Church, the teaching is that it is the couple themselves who administer the graces of the sacrament; thus, although it is normally an ordained person who officiates at a marriage ceremony, a bishop may delegate a lay person to be present for the exchange of vows; this would be done only in extreme cases such as in mission territories. In the Eastern tradition, the clergy not only witness the exchange of vows but must impart a blessing for a valid marriage to have taken place.

Unless a particular bishop has forbidden it, any bishop may preach throughout the Catholic Church, and any priest or deacon may also preach anywhere (presuming the permission of local pastor) unless his faculty to preach has been restricted or removed.

The cathedral of a diocese contains a special chair, called a cathedra, sometimes referred to as a throne, set aside in the sanctuary for the exclusive use of its Ordinary; it symbolizes his spiritual and ecclesiastical authority.

== Additional titles, status and roles ==
Bishops may fill additional roles in the Catholic Church, including the following:

=== Bishop-elect ===
A priest who has been appointed as bishop or a diocesan bishop appointed as archbishop, but before assuming office or installation.

=== Titular bishop ===
A titular bishop (or titular archbishop) is a bishop who is not bishop of a diocese; unless (since 1970) he is coadjutor or emeritus, he is assigned to a titular see, which is usually the name of a city or area that used to be the seat of a diocese, but whose episcopal see (diocese) is no longer functioning as such. Titular bishops often serve as auxiliary bishops, as officials in the Roman Curia, in the Patriarchal Curias of Eastern Churches, as papal diplomatic envoys (notably apostolic nuncios or apostolic delegates), or head certain missionary pre-diocesan jurisdictions (notably as apostolic vicar, which as of 2019 no longer gets a titular see). Since 1970, a coadjutor bishop (or archbishop) uses the title of the see he is assigned to, and a bishop (or archbishop) emeritus uses the title of his last residential see.

=== Suffragan bishop ===
A suffragan bishop leads a diocese within an ecclesiastical province other than the principal diocese, the metropolitan archdiocese.

=== Auxiliary bishop ===
An auxiliary bishop is a full-time assistant to a diocesan bishop or archbishop. Auxiliaries are titular bishops without the right of succession, who assist the diocesan bishop or archbishop in a variety of ways and are usually appointed as vicars general or episcopal vicars of the diocese in which they serve.

=== Coadjutor bishop ===
A coadjutor bishop is a bishop who is given almost equal authority to that of the diocesan bishop or archbishop; he has special faculties and the right to succeed the incumbent diocesan bishop or archbishop. The appointment of coadjutors is seen as a means of providing for continuity of church leadership. Until recent times, there was the possibility of a coadjutor bishop not having the right of succession.

=== Bishop-prelate ===
A bishop who holds an office that does not require episcopal ordination, notably either the Prelate of a personal prelature or a territorial prelature.

=== Emeritus bishop ===
When a diocesan bishop, archbishop, or auxiliary bishop retires, he is given the honorary title of "emeritus" of the last see he served, i.e., archbishop emeritus, bishop emeritus, or auxiliary bishop emeritus of the see. "Emeritus" is not used for a titular see, but could be used for a bishop who has transferred to a nondiocesan appointment without actually being retired. For example, Cardinal Luis Antonio Tagle, who was promoted to be prefect for the Congregation for the Evangelization of Peoples, became Archbishop Emeritus of Manila.

Traditionally, bishops appointed ordinaries or auxiliaries served for life. When the rare resignation occurred, the bishop was assigned a titular see. The status of "emeritus" emerged after the Second Vatican Council when bishops were at first encouraged and then required to submit their resignations at the age of 75. On 31 October 1970, Pope Paul VI decreed that "diocesan bishops or archbishops of the Latin rite who resign are no longer transferred to a titular church, but instead continue to be identified by the name of the see they have resigned."

=== Cardinal ===
A cardinal is a bishop or archbishop appointed by the Pope to serve in the College of Cardinals. Members of the college aged under 80 elect a new pope, who is in practice always one of their number, on the death or resignation of the incumbent. Cardinals also serve as papal advisors and hold positions of authority within the structure of the Catholic Church. Under canon law, a man appointed a cardinal must normally be a bishop, or accept consecration of it, but may seek papal permission to decline. Most cardinals are already archbishops of important archdioceses or patriarchates, others already serving as titular bishops in the Roman Curia. Recent popes have appointed a few priests, most of them renowned theologians, to the College of Cardinals, and these have been permitted to decline episcopal consecration. Examples include Karl Becker in 2012, Ernest Simoni in 2016, and Timothy Radcliffe in 2024.

=== Archbishop ===
An archbishop or archeparch is the head of an archdiocese, or a bishop assigned a titular see which is an archdiocese.

==== Metropolitan archbishop ====
A metropolitan is an archbishop with minor jurisdiction over an ecclesiastical province; in practice this amounts to presiding at meetings and overseeing dioceses within the province.

In Eastern Catholicism a metropolitan may also be the head of an autocephalous, sui juris, or autonomous church when the number of adherents of that tradition is small. In the Latin Church, metropolitans are always archbishops; in many Eastern churches, the title is "Metropolitan", with some of these churches using "archbishop" as a separate office.

=== Pope ===
The pope is the Bishop of Rome. The Catholic Church holds that the College of Bishops as a group is the successor of the College of Apostles. The Church also holds that uniquely among the apostles, Saint Peter, the first Bishop of Rome, was granted a role of leadership and authority, giving the pope the right to govern the Church together with the bishops. Hence, the Church holds that the Bishop of Rome, as successor of Peter, possesses the role, uniquely among bishops, of speaking for the whole Church, appointing other bishops, and managing the Church's central administration, the Roman Curia. Papal pronouncements which meet the requirements of the decree on papal infallibility of the First Vatican Council are considered infallible.

==== Pope emeritus ====
Upon his resignation as pope (Bishop of Rome) on 28 February 2013, Benedict XVI became Supreme Pontiff Emeritus (or, colloquially, Pope Emeritus). The sole holder of the title to date, he held it for nearly a decade, until his death at age 95 in 2022.

=== Patriarch ===
The title of patriarch in the Catholic Church is applied to either the patriarch of an Eastern Church sui iuris or to a minor Latin patriarch. The patriarch of an Eastern Church sui iuris heads an autonomous Church, is elected by the synod of that Church, and exercises authority within his patriarchal territory and on eparchies and parishes outside his territory. A minor Latin patriarch is an honorific title above archbishop given to some Latin dioceses for historical reasons.

=== Catholicos ===
Some Eastern Catholic Churches style their heads as catholicoi, a historic title for the head of a Church. The Armenian Catholic Church, the Chaldean Catholic Church, and the Syro-Malankara Catholic Church all style their heads as such.

=== Major archbishop ===
Major archbishops are the heads of a major archiepiscopal church. The major archbishops' authority within their respective sui juris churches is equal to that of a patriarch, but they receive fewer ceremonial honors and their election must be confirmed by the Holy See.

=== Primate ===
In the Catholic Church, a primate is usually the bishop of the oldest diocese or the capital of a (present or former) nation; the title is one of honor.

=== Public office ===
Since the publication of the new Code of Canon Law in 1983 by Pope John Paul II, all members of the Catholic clergy are forbidden to hold public office without the express permission of the Holy See.

== Consecration of bishops ==
The appointment of bishops in the Catholic Church is a complicated process that requires the participation of several officials. In the Latin Church, the local synod, the papal nuncio (or apostolic delegate), various dicasteries of the Roman Curia, and the Pope all take a part; since the 1970s it has become common practice for the nuncio to solicit input from clergy and laity within the vacant diocese. In patriarchal and major archiepiscopal Eastern Churches, the permanent synod, the holy synod, and the patriarch or major archbishop also play a role in the selection of bishops.

== Apostolic succession and other churches ==
The Catholic Church's view is that bishops form an unbroken succession to the apostles, a concept known as apostolic succession. Since 1896, when Pope Leo XIII issued the bull Apostolicae curae, the Catholic Church has not recognised Anglican orders as valid, because of changes in the ordination rites that took place in the 16th century as well as divergence in the understanding of the theology of episcopacy and Eucharist. However, this view has since been complicated because Old Catholic bishops, whose orders are fully recognised as valid by Rome, have acted as co-consecrators in Anglican episcopal consecrations. According to the church historian Timothy Dufort, by 1969 all Church of England bishops had acquired Old Catholic lines of apostolic succession fully recognised by the Holy See.

The Catholic Church does recognize, as valid but illicit, ordinations performed by some independent Catholic groups such as the Old Catholic Church of the Utrecht Union and the Polish National Catholic Church, so long as those receiving the ordination are baptized males and a valid rite of episcopal consecration—expressing the proper functions and sacramental status of a bishop—is used. The Holy See also recognises as valid the ordinations of the Eastern Orthodox, Old Catholic, Oriental Orthodox and Assyrian Nestorian churches. Regarding the Churches of the East, the Second Vatican Council stated:

To remove, then, all shadow of doubt, this holy Council solemnly declares that the Churches of the East, while remembering the necessary unity of the whole Church, have the power to govern themselves according to the disciplines proper to them, since these are better suited to the character of their faithful, and more for the good of their souls.

== Dress and vestments ==
=== Latin Church ===
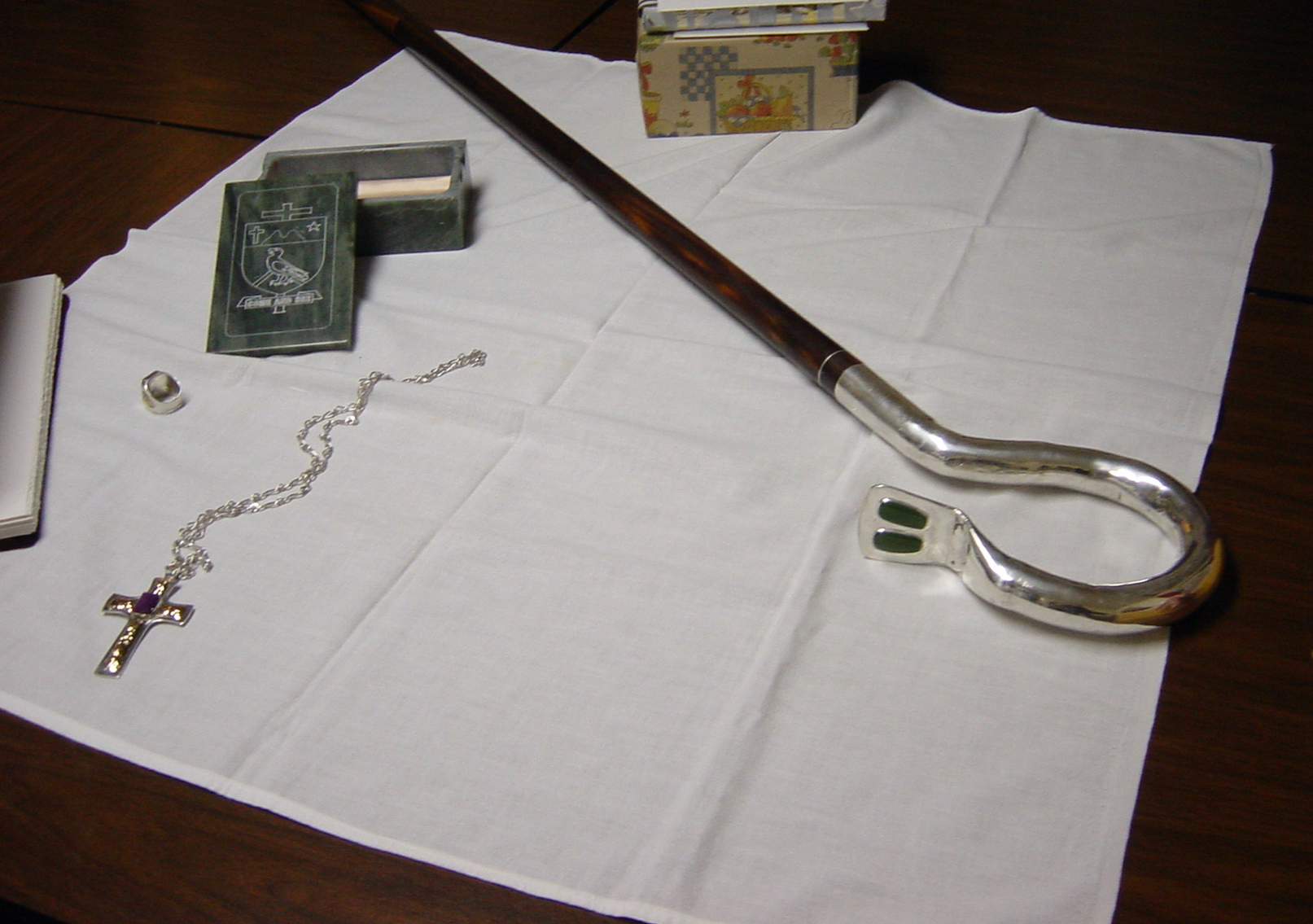
Some of the insignia of a bishop's office (clockwise from right): crosier, pectoral cross, and episcopal ring.

The everyday dress of Latin Church bishops may consist of a black (or, in tropical countries, white) cassock with amaranth trim and purple fascia, along with a pectoral cross and episcopal ring. The 1969 Instruction on the dress of prelates stated that the dress for ordinary use may instead be a simple cassock without coloured trim. Since 1969, a black suit and clerical shirt, already customary in English-speaking countries, has become very common also in countries where previously it was unknown.

A Latin Church bishop's choir dress, which is worn when attending but not celebrating liturgical functions, consists of the purple cassock with amaranth trim, rochet, purple zucchetto, purple biretta with a tuft, and pectoral cross. The cappa magna may be worn, but only within the bishop's own diocese and on especially solemn occasions.

The mitre, zucchetto, and stole are generally worn by bishops when presiding over liturgical functions. For liturgical functions other than the Mass the bishop typically wears the cope. Within his own diocese and when celebrating solemnly elsewhere with the consent of the local ordinary, he also uses the crosier. When celebrating Mass, a bishop, like a priest, wears the chasuble. The Caeremoniale Episcoporum recommends, but does not impose, that in solemn celebrations a bishop should also wear a dalmatic, which can always be white, beneath the chasuble, especially when administering the sacrament of holy orders, blessing an abbot or abbess, and dedicating a church or an altar. The Caeremoniale Episcoporum no longer makes mention of pontifical gloves, pontifical sandals, liturgical stockings (also known as buskins), the maniple, or the accoutrements that it once prescribed for the bishop's horse.

=== Eastern Catholic ===
The everyday dress of Eastern Catholic bishops is often the same as their Latin Church counterparts: black clerical suit with pectoral cross or panagia.

==== Byzantine Rite Catholic ====
Traditionally, bishops are monks and so their everyday dress is the monastic habit with a panagia and, depending on rank, also a pectoral cross and a second panagia.

When attending liturgical functions at which he does not celebrate, a bishop may wear a mantya, panagia and an engolpion if he is a patriarch or metropolitan bishop. He will also carry a pastoral staff in the form of a walking stick topped by a pommel. No episcopal ring exists in the Byzantine Rite.

When participating in the Divine Liturgy, a bishop wears the sakkos (Imperial dalmatic), omophorion, epigonation and Byzantine-style mitre which is based on the closed Imperial crown of the late Byzantine Empire and is made in the shape of a bulbous crown, completely enclosed, and the material is of brocade, damask or cloth of gold. It may be embroidered, and richly decorated with jewels, with four icons attached: Christ, the Theotokos, John the Baptist and the Cross. These mitres are usually gold, but other liturgical colours may be used. The mitre is topped by a cross, made out of metal and standing upright. He also carries a crosier of that rite's style. Presiding over other services, he may wear fewer vestments, but also a mantya unless wearing a sticharion.

== See also ==
- Catholic Church hierarchy
- Historical list of the Catholic bishops of the United States
- List of Catholic apostolic administrations
- List of Catholic apostolic prefectures
- List of Catholic apostolic vicariates
- List of Catholic archdioceses
- List of Catholic dioceses (alphabetical)
- List of Catholic dioceses (structured view)
- List of Catholic military dioceses
- List of Catholic missions sui juris
- List of Eastern Catholic exarchates
- List of the Catholic bishops of the United States
- List of the Catholic dioceses of the United States
- Lists of patriarchs, archbishops, and bishops
