= Saint-Bonnet-le-Troncy =

- Commune
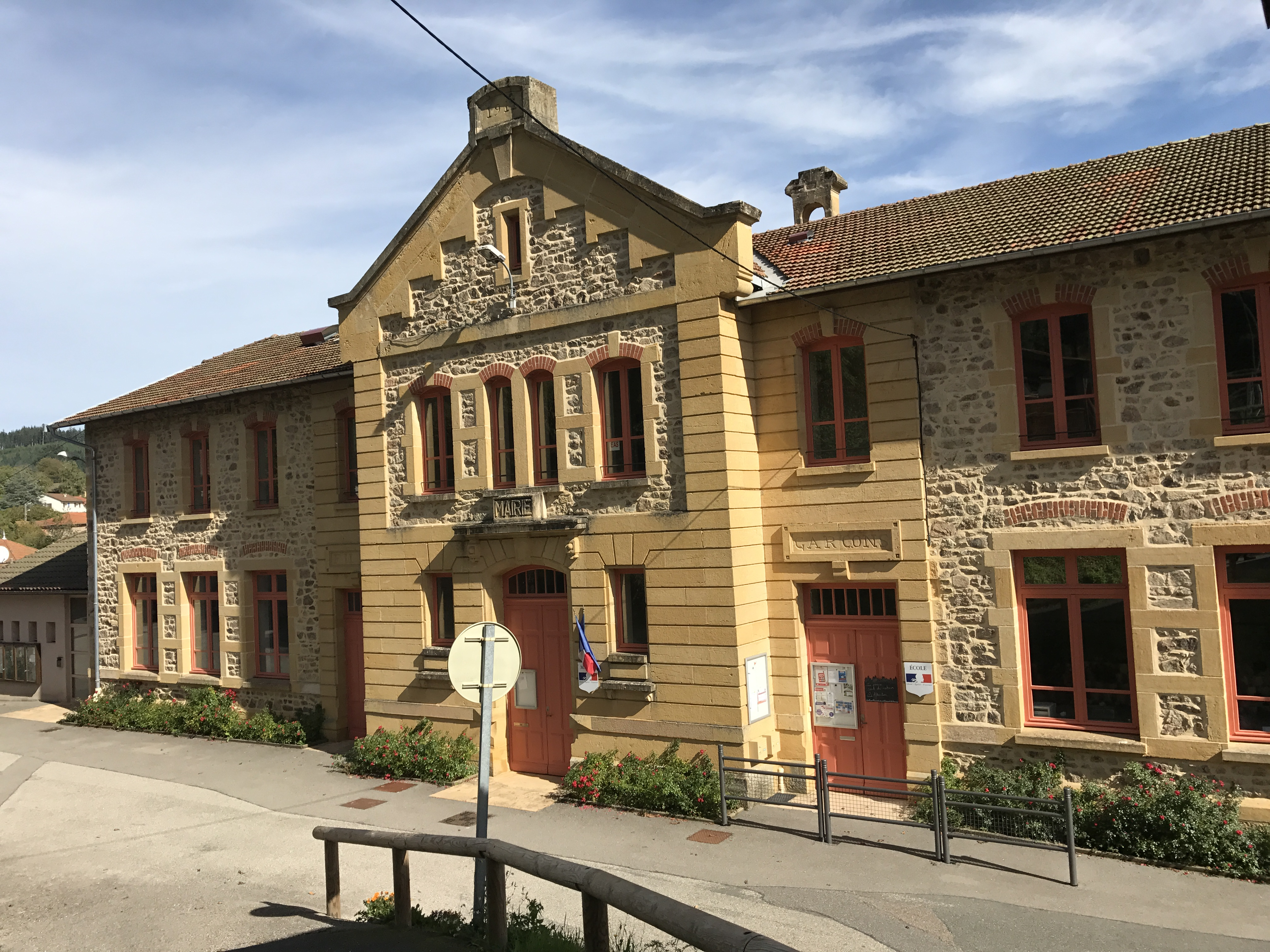
- The town hall of Saint-Bonnet-le-Troncy
- Location of Saint-Bonnet-le-Troncy
- Location within France Location within Auvergne-Rhône-Alpes
- Coordinates: 46°05′09″N 4°25′41″E
- Country: France
- Region: Auvergne-Rhône-Alpes
- Department: Rhône
- Arrondissement: Villefranche-sur-Saône
- Canton: Thizy-les-Bourgs
- Intercommunality: CA de l'Ouest Rhodanien

Government
  - Mayor (2020–2026): Pascal Touchard
- Area^{1}: 15.65 km^{2} (6.04 sq mi)
- Elevation: 750 m (2,460 ft)
- Highest elevation: 905 m (2,969 ft)
- Lowest elevation: 491 m (1,611 ft)
- Population (2023): 307
  - Density: 19.6/km^{2} (50.8/sq mi)
- Time zone: UTC+01:00 (CET)
  - Summer (DST): UTC+02:00 (CEST)
- INSEE/Postal code: 69183 /69870
- ^{1} French Land Register data, which excludes lakes, ponds, glaciers > 1 km^{2} (0.386 sq mi or 247 acres) and river estuaries.

Saint-Bonnet-le-Troncy (French pronunciation: [sɛ̃ bɔnɛ lə tʁɔ̃si]) is a commune in the Rhône department in eastern France.

== Demography ==
Historical population
Year	Pop.	±% p.a.
1968	364	—
1975	281	−3.63%
1982	268	−0.67%
1990	265	−0.14%
1999	273	+0.33%
2007	306	+1.44%
2012	305	−0.07%
2017	313	+0.52%
2023	307	−0.32%
Source: INSEE

== See also ==
- Communes of the Rhône department
