= Jean-Claude Colin =

French priest

Venerable Jean-Claude Colin SM
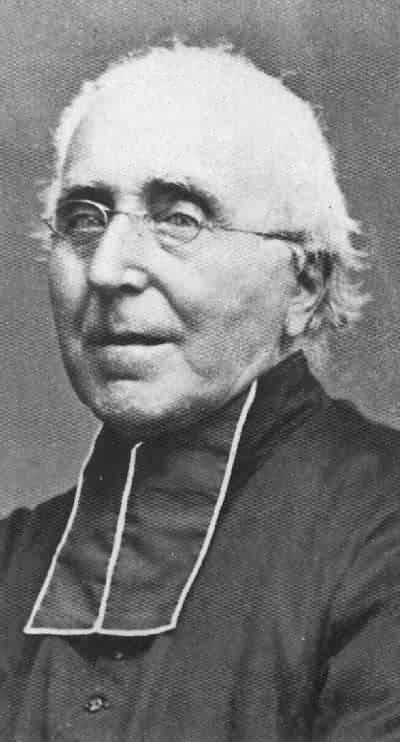
- Ven. Jean-Claude Colin, S.M.
- Born: 7 August 1790; St-Bonnet-le-Troncy, France
- Died: 15 November 1875 (aged 85); La Neylière, France
- Venerated in: Catholic Church
- Feast: 15 November

Jean-Claude Colin, SM (7 August 1790 – 15 November 1875) was a French priest who became the founder of the Society of Mary (Marists).

== Early life ==
Jean-Claude, born on 7 August 1790 at the hamlet of Barbery, in the Beaujolais region of central France, the son of Jacques Colin and his wife Marie Gonnet, who had married in 1771.

He was the eighth of a total of nine children: Claudine, Jean, Mariette, Sébastien, Jeanne-Marie, Pierre, Anne-Marie (who died at birth), Jean-Claude and Joseph. Jean-Claude's eldest sister Claudine stood as his godmother, and his brother Jean as his godfather, hence the baby's name Jean-Claude. The parents owned and cultivated a piece of land, and during the winter turned to weaving.

The regime installed by the French Revolution introduced a piece of legislation known as the Civil Constitution of the Clergy, which caused a split into the Church in France, dividing those priests who accepted the Constitution from those who remained faithful to Rome. Jean-Claude's parents supported the clergy loyal to Rome. An order of arrest was issued against Jacques Colin for his open support of the local parish priest, Benoît-Marie Cabuchet, who had opposed the Constitution and was consequently hunted by the revolutionary authorities.

Jacques had go into hiding for a year. His house was boarded up and all his goods were sold off.

In 1795 Marie Colin died, aged 37. Jacques Colin died not quite three weeks later, leaving the children orphaned. Jean-Claude, not yet five years old, was taken into the care of his father's brother, Sébastien, who lived in the area at Saint-Bonnet-le-Troncy.

Sébastien was a bachelor. To cope with the children he employed a housekeeper, Marie Echallier, to look after them. She was a deeply religious woman, but her version of religion was gloomy and guilt-ridden. In these years Jean-Claude developed a tendency to scruples which gave him much trouble, but which was in later life to make him sensitive to people struggling with similar difficulties.

When he reached the age of fourteen, Jean-Claude, accompanied by his elder brother Pierre, entered the minor seminary of Saint-Jodard, a kind of secondary school for boys preparing for priesthood. Jean-Claude's hopes were for a ministry as a priest where he could live a life of quiet prayer. The disciplined seminary lifestyle, obedience and piety came easily to him.

The vast diocese of Lyon created by the 1801 Concordat between the French First Republic and the Holy See had established a network of several such minor seminaries. Jean-Claude was subsequently transferred to continue his secondary studies in similar institutions at Alix (in 1809), and finally at Verrières (in 1812), where he was a contemporary of Marcellin Champagnat and John Vianney. While being shy and liable to serious illness and despite the doubts raised by his teachers about his suitability for an active pastoral life, Jean-Claude handled his studies without difficulty and was among the top students.

In the late summer of 1813, Jean-Claude was sent to the major seminary of Saint Irenaeus in the city of Lyon for the final years of preparation for the priesthood. He was twenty-three years old. Here, towards the end of 1814, he met fellow seminarian Jean-Claude Courveille, who in 1812 had entered the seminary of the diocese of Saint-Flour but then transferred to that of Lyon. Courveille had been cured of partial blindness after praying to Our Lady of Le Puy before her statue in Le Puy Cathedral and came to the inner conviction that just as there had arisen at the time of the emergence of Protestantism a religious Society bearing the name of Jesus, whose members called themselves Jesuits, so at this time of Revolution there should be a Society bearing the name of Mary, whose members would call themselves Marists. A further conviction of his was that this was a direct wish of the Virgin Mary. At Lyon Courveille recruited a group of senior seminarians to his idea.

On 22 July 1816, several seminarians from St Irenaeus, already deacons, were ordained priests for the Lyon diocese. They included Colin, Courveille and Marcellin Champagnat. The next day, 23 July, a group of twelve of the newly ordained climbed the hill to the shrine of Notre-Dame de Fourvière overlooking Lyon. There, in the ancient chapel of the Blessed Virgin Mary, they made a solemn pledge to establish the Society of Mary as soon as they could. The newly ordained priests were given an immediate posting to a parish in the Lyon archdiocese.

== Parish ministry ==
In the case of the still shy Jean-Claude Colin, the posting was to be assistant priest to his older brother Pierre (ordained priest in 1810) in the parish at Salles (now Salles-en-Beaujolais), where Jean-Claude celebrated his first Mass on 26 July. The two brothers were sent within weeks to take over another parish, this time in the village of Cerdon nestling high in the Bugey mountains. A few years later, when the former diocese of Belley was restored, this parish was to fall within its boundaries, thus cutting the Colins off from the diocese of Lyon. However, For the moment, till that happened, as assistant priest at Cerdon, Jean-Claude spoke to his brother of his version of a future the Society of Mary, gaining Pierre's eager adhesion. Jean.Claude began to work on drawing up provisional rules for the Society of Mary. Pierre, in the meantime, showed his determination by convincing two women living in the parish, Jean-Marie Chavoin and Marie Jotillon to join them in their idea.

The town of Cerdon having passed to the newly reorganized Diocese of Belley, Colin obtained from its bishop, Alexandre-Raymond Devie, permission to take a few companions and preach missions across the Bugey, a poor and somewhat neglected part of the diocese still suffering from the devastating effects of the Revolution.

Their number increased, and in spite of the opposition of the bishop, who wished to make the society a diocesan congregation, Colin obtained (1834) from Gregory XVI the Papal bull approving the Lay Confraternity or Association of the Blessed Virgin Mary for the Conversion of Sinners and the Perseverance of the Just. In 1836 Pope Gregory XVI gave canonical approbation of the Society of Mary (priests and brothers) as an order with simple vows.

== Society of Mary ==
He was asked to take over the College of Belley as Principal and when Rome approved the Society of Mary in 1836 he was elected as its first Superior General. During the eighteen years of his administration (1836–1854) Colin showed great activity, organizing the different branches of his society, founding in France missionary houses and colleges. Rome assigned the new Society the evangelisation of the Vicariate of Western Oceania.

In 1817 the Colin brothers invited two young women to come to Cerdon to begin the Sisters of the Congregation of Mary. One was to become its foundress: Jeanne-Marie Chavoin. Meanwhile, Champagnat was establishing the Brothers' branch in his first parish of La Valla. Always he saw Jean-Claude Colin as the leader of the Marist project.

In 1850 the Papal approval for the laity was amended establishing the Lay branch of the Society as the Third Order of Mary. Laity were integral to Colin's vision for the Society of Mary from its earliest beginnings and he worked closely with laity at the parish in Cerdon. Laity are now involved in all parts of the world and his lay legacy is still particularly strong in Oceania.

In 1854 Colin resigned the office of superior general and retired to Notre-Dame-de-la-Neylière, where he spent the last twenty years of his life revising and completing the Constitutions. The Constitutions of the Society of Mary were definitively approved by the Holy See on 28 February 1873. Jean-Claude Colin died at La Neylière two years later on 15 November 1875.

The Musée Jean-Claude Colin is a private museum in Saint-Bonnet-le-Troncy presenting a retrospective of the life of Colin.

== Veneration ==
Colin's spiritual writings were approved by theologians on 29 May 1907, and his cause was formally opened on 9 December 1908, granting him the title of Servant of God. He was later declared Venerable.

== See also ==
- Peter Julian Eymard
- Peter Chanel
