= Jeanne-Marie Chavoin =

Founder of the Marist Sister (1786–1858)

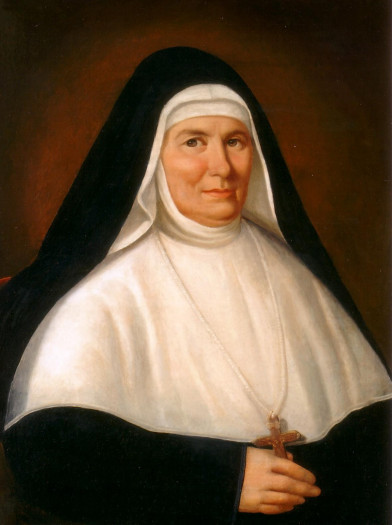
Jeanne-Marie Chavoin, co-foundress of the Marist Sisters.

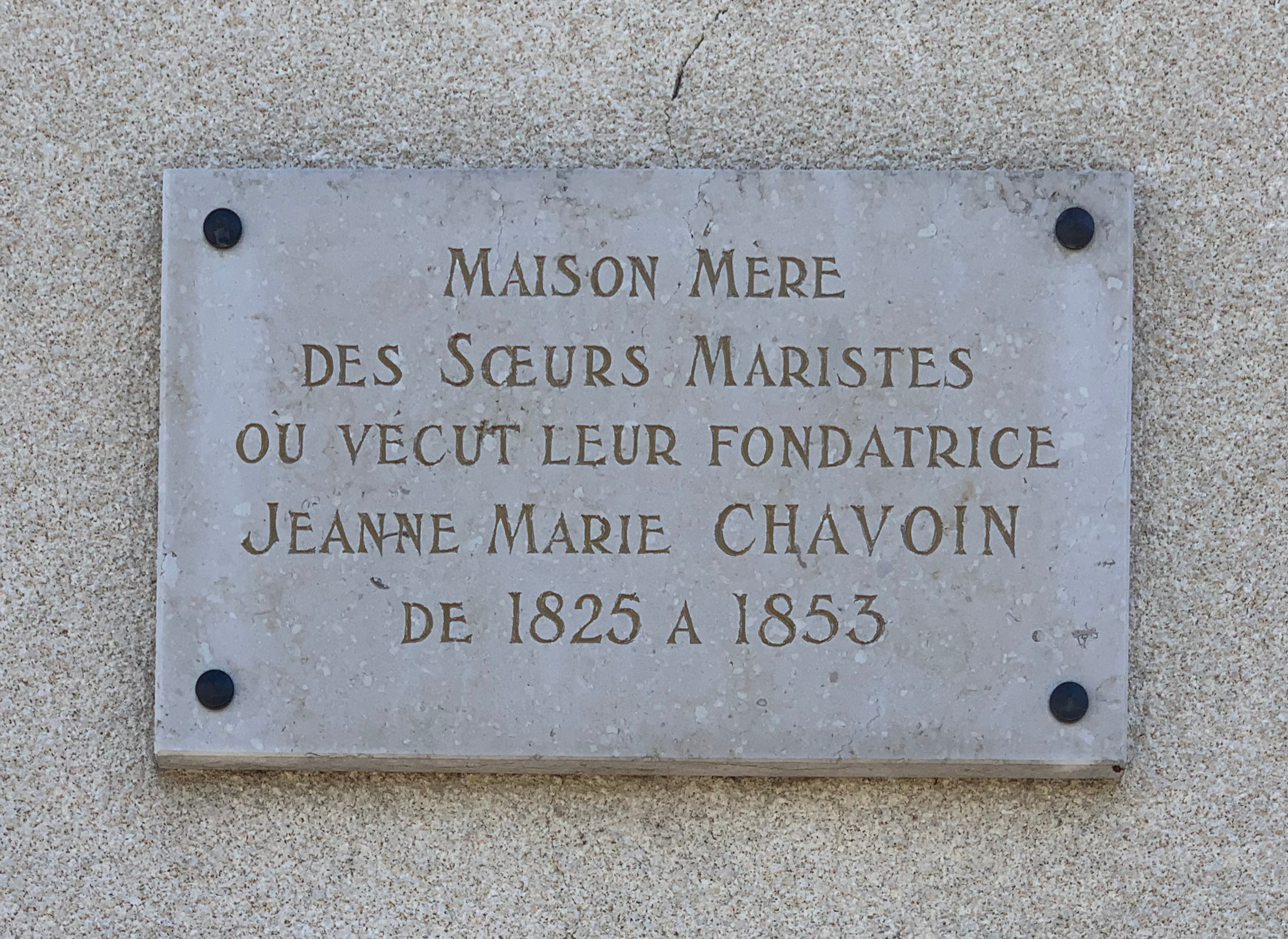
Plaque in Belley

Jeanne-Marie Chavoin (29 August 1786 – 30 June 1858) and Jean-Claude Colin together founded the Marist Sisters, a Catholic religious institute of women.

Jeanne-Marie was born in the village of Coutouvre, France. She met Fr Pierre Colin when he was parish priest at Coutouvre. She later joined Jean Claude Colin at Cerdon where they were both serving as priests. Together they worked on the beginning of the Marist Sisters. The Marist Organization was purely based on women and their relationship to God. The Marist legacy has successfully opened many schools across the globe.

== Life ==
Jeanne-Marie Chavoin was born in the small village of Coutouvre in France on the 29th of August 1786. Chavoin was considered sinful because she was conceived by her 19 and 20 year old parents 6 months before their marriage. She had two sisters Marie and Claudine-Marie. Marie died at the age of one.

After being inspired by a sermon, Chavoin started praying in her teenage years and joined a prayer group called the Association of Divine love. Through this group she was asked to take up religious monastic positions but each time she declined as she wanted to do something religious but less monastic. Eventually though Fr. Jean-Philibert Lefranc God spoke to Chavoin saying "God does not want you to join an existing congregation, but one which has yet to come into existence".

Circa 1817 Chavoin, Jean-Claude Colin and Marie Jotillon started the Marist movement in Cerdon. Chavoin's encouragement was important to Colin in the early days of the Society of Mary. Later they fell out.

Sister Jeanne-Marie Chavoin died on the 30th of June 1858 in an unknown location, mostly thought to be in the south of France.

The Marist Sisters movement flourished until 1821 where Chavoin and Colin had a disagreement about whether to keep the movement enclosed or to be missionaries. This broke up the original Marist movement but Chavoin continued the movement that is still alive today.

The Marist movement continued by Chavoin is now a global brother and sisterhood and has set up many schools and churches.
