= Marcellin Champagnat =

French priest and founder of Marist Brothers

Saint Marcellin Champagnat FMS
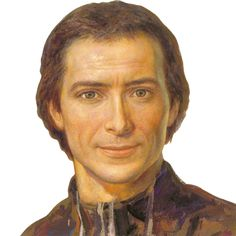
- Official portrait of Marcellin Champagnat

Priest & Founder Missionary
- Born: 20 May 1789; Le Rosey, France
- Died: 6 June 1840 (aged 51); Saint-Chamond, France
- Venerated in: Catholic Church
- Beatified: 29 May 1955, The Vatican by Pope Pius XII
- Canonized: 18 April 1999, The Vatican by Pope John Paul II
- Feast: 6 June
- Patronage: Education, teachers, and simplicity

Marcellin Joseph Benedict Champagnat, FMS (20 May 1789 – 6 June 1840) was a French Catholic priest who founded the Marist Brothers, a religious congregation of brothers devoted to Mary and dedicated to education. He was canonized in 1999 and his feast day is 6 June, his death anniversary.

Champagnat was born in the year of the storming of the Bastille, the start of the French Revolution. The religious, political, economic, and social unrest of the times he lived influenced his priorities and life path. Champagnat was ordained as a priest on 22 July 1816 and was part of a group led by Jean-Claude Colin, who founded the Society of Mary, a separate religious congregation.

== Seminary and ordination ==
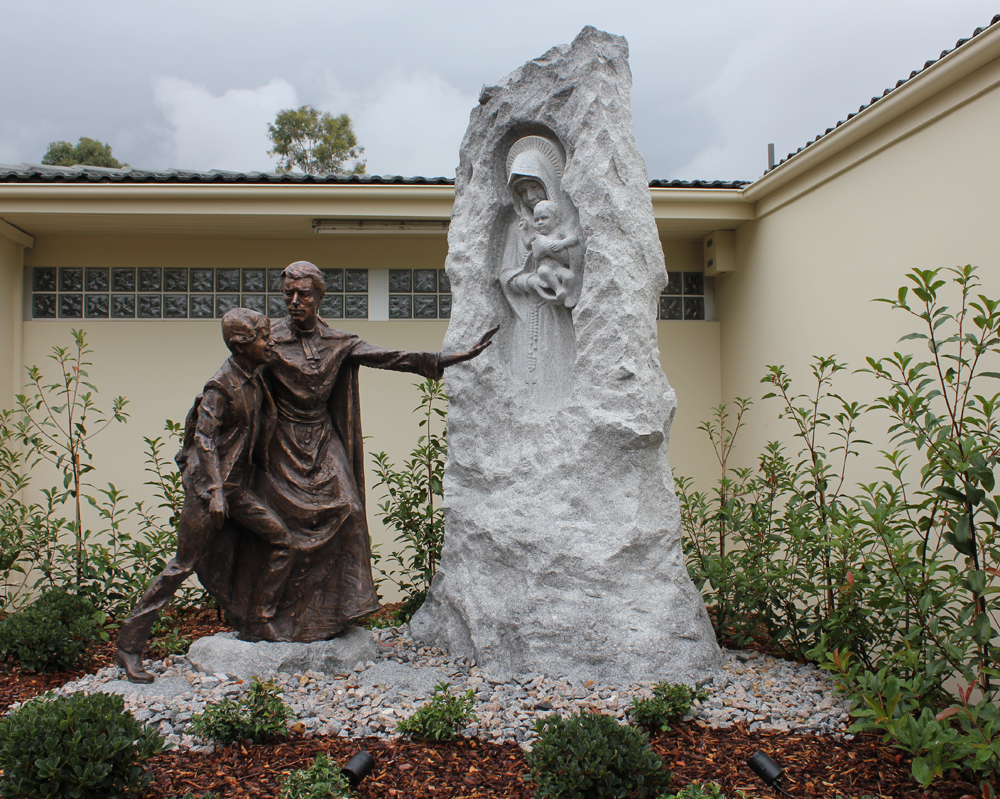
Life-size bronze statue of St Marcellin Champagnat outside Parramatta Marist High School by sculptor Linda Klarfeld

With money he earned from raising sheep, he went to the Minor Seminary at Verrières-en-Forez. He entered in October 1805. Older than many of his classmates, at the age of 17, he failed his first year and was sent home. He was readmitted, through the efforts of his mother, his parish priest, and the superior of the seminary.

Champagnat, who by this time had developed from being timid and shy into a gregarious young man, was known to frequent the local pubs. As a consequence, he was eventually regarded as a member of a group known as the “Happy Gang,” made up of seminarians who were a familiar sight in the taverns of the town during their free time.

At the beginning of his second year, Champagnat settled down to a more sober lifestyle. He continued to apply himself to his studies throughout his second year at the seminary. Two events, occurring during the summer following the second year, also helped to moderate his exuberant behaviour. The first was the sudden death on 2 September 1807 of his friend, Denis Duplay. The second was a serious conversation with Father Linossier, who supervised the seminary, about improving Champagnat's general conduct. Champagnat left Verrières for St. Irenaeus, the major seminary near Lyons.

He then attended the major seminary at Saint Irenaeus in Lyon for his spiritual and theological formation as a priest. Among his companions were Jean-Marie Vianney and Jean-Claude Colin. He was no natural scholar but through hard work and the support of his mother and aunt he was finally ordained.

It was here that the idea for the Society of Mary was conceived and promoted by a group of seminarians, including Champagnat. He was ordained on 22 July 1816, at the age of twenty-seven, and the next day, travelled to the shrine of Our Lady of Fourviéres above Lyons with others interested in establishing a Society of Mary. The group of young men together dedicated themselves to Mary as "The Society of Mary". From the start, he announced the society should include teaching Brothers to work with children deprived of Christian education in remote rural areas because others were not going to them.

== Founding the Marist Brothers ==
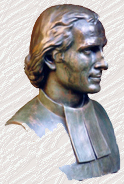
Bust of Champagnat

After his ordination, Champagnat was appointed pastor in La Valla, on the slopes of Mont Pilat. Champagnat was struck by the isolation in which people lived and the lack of education in the rural area. At the end of October 1816, after attending Jean-Baptist Montagne, a dying sixteen-year-old completely ignorant of basic Catholic teaching, Champagnat acted upon his conviction of the need for religious Brothers.

After witnessing the poor treatment of a student by a teacher on his first day at school, Champagnat's thoughts on education had been shaken. He was motivated to establish a society that would care for indigent children and display "great zeal for the poor". When he later instructed the Marists on how to educate their students, he ordered them, "Keep loving them as long as they are with you, since this is the only way to work with any success at reforming them. Love them all equally—no outcasts, no favourites". He stated on another occasion, "I cannot see a child without wanting to tell him how much God loves him".

On 2 January 1817, Champagnat encouraged two young men Jean-Marie Granjon and Jean-Baptiste Audras, to join him in forming the nucleus of the Marist Brothers. Others soon followed. La Valla thus became the birthplace of the Marist Brothers. In 1817 he started a small establishment for training teachers at La Valla, which became a centre for his young Brothers. In 1824, when the new French king, Charles X, transferred the oversight of elementary education to the Catholic Church, Champagnat won support to build a new and larger novitiate, which became the Notre Dame Hermitage, and the brothers began to spread more widely.

In the early years of the new society, Champagnat personally supervised the training of the Brothers, visiting all of their schools and taking part in their teaching. By 1833, the novices of the Brothers were primarily men in their late teens and early twenties. They were required to be literate and numerate and received instruction in doctrine and the religious life as they trained to become teachers, living by a regular timetable of prayer, study, and manual work. Soon, the Brothers extended their services from the small country parishes in which they had begun their work to the larger towns.

In 1818 Champagnat opened the first Marist school whose timetable he designed in such a way to fit the farming needs of his parishioners (such as allowing children off school to help in the fields at planting and harvesting time). He set fees for the school at a level he knew most rural families could meet. In fact, if he knew the family was unable to afford anything, the tuition was free. Champagnat had a great devotion to the guardian angels, and directed that an image of a guardian angel be placed in every classroom.

Encouraged by the success of the school in La Valla, others were founded at Marlhes in 1819, in Saint-Sauveur-Street 1820, and in Bourg-Argental in 1822. But this success endangered the small congregation, which had little more than novices. In March 1822, eight applicants came from Haute-Loire, giving a new impetus to the institution, and allows the creation of new houses in Vanosc 1823, Saint-Symphorien-le-Chateau 1823, and Chavanay Charlieu 1824.

In 1837, Champagnat printed a Rule for his Brothers. In view of Champagnat's declining health, however, in 1839 Jean-Claude Colin advised him to have the Brothers elect a successor. This took place with the election of Brother François Rivat as director-general and Champagnat's successor on 12 October 1839.

== Final years ==
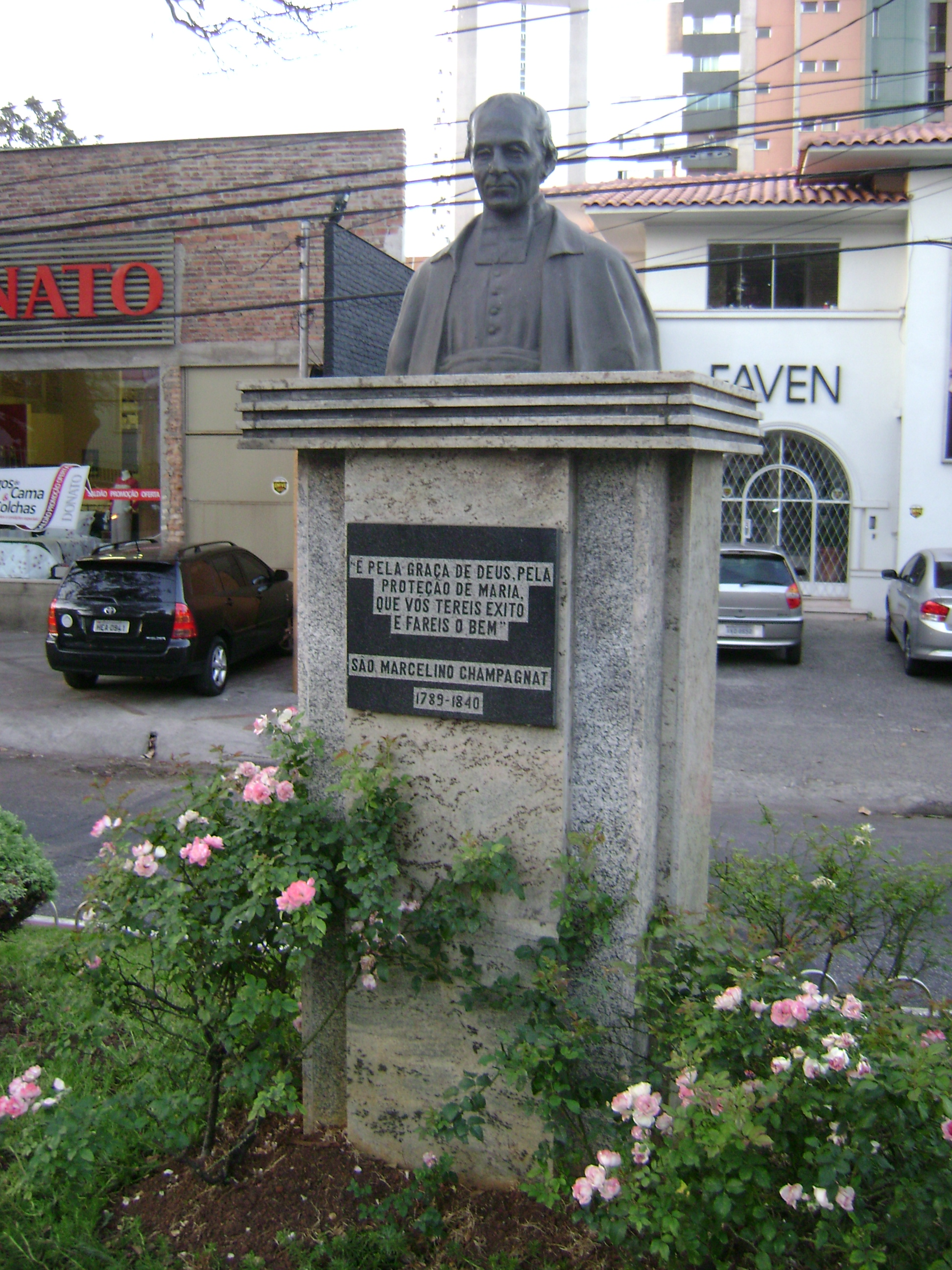
Statue of Champagnat at Belo Horizonte, Brazil

After a long-term illness, Champagnat died of cancer on 6 June 1840, aged 51, at Our Lady of the Hermitage in the Gier River valley about 30 kilometres from where he had commenced his work. He was buried on 8 June. He left this message in his Spiritual Testament of 18 May 1840: "Let there be among you just one heart and one mind. Let it always be said of the Little Brothers of Mary as it was of the early Christians: See how they love one another!" By that time there were 278 Brothers and 48 Marist schools in France, and the order was spreading to the South Pacific.

The nascent order called themselves Les Petits Frères de Marie or Little Brothers of Mary. The Marist Brothers Institute was formally approved in 1863 by Pope Pius IX, and were given the name Institutum Fratrum Maristarum a Scholis. Members of the order are identified by the initials "FMS".

== Veneration ==
Champagnat's cause was formally opened on 9 August 1896, granting him the title of Servant of God. Champagnat was declared Venerable on 11 July 1920 by Pope Benedict XV, beatified by Pope Pius XII on 29 May 1955, and canonised by Pope John Paul II on 18 April 1999. His feast day is observed in the Catholic Church on 6 June.

== Legacy ==
At his death, there were 280 Marist Brothers in the south of France. The number grew to 1500 Brothers in 1856. In 2000, there are about 5000 Marist Brothers and tens of thousands of lay people who undertake the work of spreading Marist education in 74 countries around the world.

Champagnat never wrote an extended exposition of his educational philosophy, but he believed that to teach children one must love them; secular subjects should be well taught as a means of attracting children to the schools, and they would learn the basic elements of their faith as well. Influenced by the French school of spirituality, Champagnat saw God at the centre of life and the Virgin Mary as a sure means of attracting people to God.

The endemic Italian columbine Aquilegia champagnatii is named in his honour.

== See also ==
- Peter Chanel
- Peter Julian Eymard
- John Vianney
