= Austin Woodbury =

Australian philosopher and Catholic priest (1899–1979)

Austin M. Woodbury (1899 near Spencer, in the Hawkesbury Valley of New South Wales – 1979) was an Australian Catholic philosopher and priest (Society of Mary).

== Biography ==
Austin Maloney Woodbury S.M. (1899-1979) was born on 2 March 1899 at Lower Mangrove (Spencer), New South Wales, Australia. He was the sixth child of Austin Herbert Woodbury and his wife Margaret, nee Maloney, who had eleven children.

His family was devoutly Catholic. Four of his sisters joined religious orders. From an early age Woodbury showed great intellectual promise and a love of learning.

He discerned a vocation to the religious life and entered the Society of Mary (Marist Fathers) in 1918, completing his secondary studies at the juniorate in Sydney and Mittagong (1919–20). On 7 March 1921, the feast of St Thomas Aquinas, he entered the New Zealand Marist Novitiate at “Greenmeadows” Seminary in Hawkes Bay, Napier and took his first vows on 2 February 1923. Woodbury was sent to Rome in 1926 for further studies at the Pontifical University of St Thomas Aquinas in the City (Angelicum). There he was taught by the prominent Dominican theologian Fr Reginald Garrigou-Lagrange O.P (1874-1964).

He completed two doctorates in a very short space of time between 1927-1928. During his time in Rome he was ordained to the priesthood on 31 July 1927. On his return from Rome in 1928 he was sent to New Zealand where he taught at St Patrick’s College, Wellington and then at Greenmeadows (1930–36). From 1938 to 1943 he became founding rector of Bl. Peter Chanel Seminary, Toongabbie, NSW.

On 7 March 1945 Dr Woodbury established the Aquinas Academy in Sydney. The Academy was a school of philosophy and theology open to the laity, which, as the name suggests, sought to especially promote the teachings of St Thomas Aquinas. During the period 1945 to 1974 Dr Woodbury taught courses in both philosophy and theology, and at the height of his teaching an average of 600 students would enrol each year. He retired from the Academy in 1974 and died in Sydney on 3 February 1979.

=== The Aquinas Academy ===
The Aquinas Academy was set up under the auspices of the Australian Province of the Marist Fathers by Fr Austin Woodbury SM in March 1945. The Academy began as a centre for the study of Philosophy and Theology in the Thomistic tradition. For some twenty-nine years it continued in this capacity under Fr Woodbury's guidance, in premises at the back of St Patrick's Church, Gloucester Street, in The Rocks (Sydney, NSW). For a short while the Academy offered a License in Philosophy under accreditation from the University of St Thomas in Rome. Since its inception, a number of qualified priests, religious and laity have been part of the lecturing staff. The Academy was one of the pioneers of Catholic adult education in Australia.

Since 1975, the Academy has increasingly focused on general adult education in the faith. It no longer teaches Thomistic philosophy or theology.

== Woodbury's Texts ==
- Defensive Metaphysics (1947)
- Logic (1948)
- Natural Philosophy (1949)
- Natural Philosophy: Psychology (1951)
- Ethics (1955)
- Basic Morals (1962)
- Ostensive Metaphysics: Ontology (1962)
- The Sacraments in Common (1963)
- God as Consummating His Works or the Last Things (1964)
- Ostensive Metaphysics: Natural Theology (1967)
- Introduction to Philosophy (1972)
- Apologetics
- Essence of Grace
- Introduction to Theology (1959)
- St. Thomas' Proofs That God is
- The Supernatural and Grace
- Treatise on the Message of Salvation: Bk IV. The Gospels
- Various Works
- Commentary on Summa Theologiae I, qq. 1-2; Existence of God
