= Marie-Françoise Perroton =

French Nun(1796 – 1873)

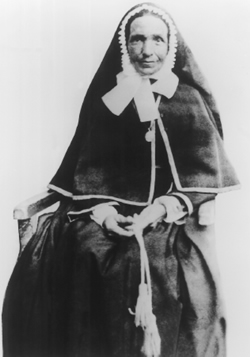
Marie-Françoise Perroton

Marie-Françoise Perroton (7 February 1796 – 10 August 1873), a French nun, was a pioneer of the Missionary Sisters of the Society of Mary in the Pacific. She was the first single female missionary to arrive in the Pacific.

== Biography ==
Marie-Françoise Perroton was born in Lyon, France on 7 February 1796. She completed her education in a boarding school run by the Dames Caillot, where she later joined as an assistant teacher. She was associated with the Society for the Propagation of the Faith founded by Pauline Jaricot in 1822, where Perroton involved in fundraising for the missions.

In an open letter, the women of the Island of Wallis appealed to the women of Lyons asking for women teachers. This letter was widely published. She responded to this call for help and decided to go to the Pacific, which was rejected by the superior of the Society of Mary. However she was accepted to accompany Captain Auguste Marceau 's Marist missionaries to Oceania in a trading vessel. She left on 15 November 1845.

After eleven months at sea, Perroton arrived in Wallis on 23 October 1846, but Bishop Pierre-Marie Bataillon, the Catholic priest there was reluctant to welcome her. But the native king offered her protection, and ordered to build a hut for her near the ocean. He also entrusted his daughter Amélie to her. For eight years, Perroton lived in intense isolation without the company of women of her own culture. Later, other women pioneers joined her.

Perroton founded a school for teaching women and young girls. She also worked to improve the daily lives of women.

She died in Alo on 10 August 1873.
