= Saint-Clair-du-Rhône =

- Commune
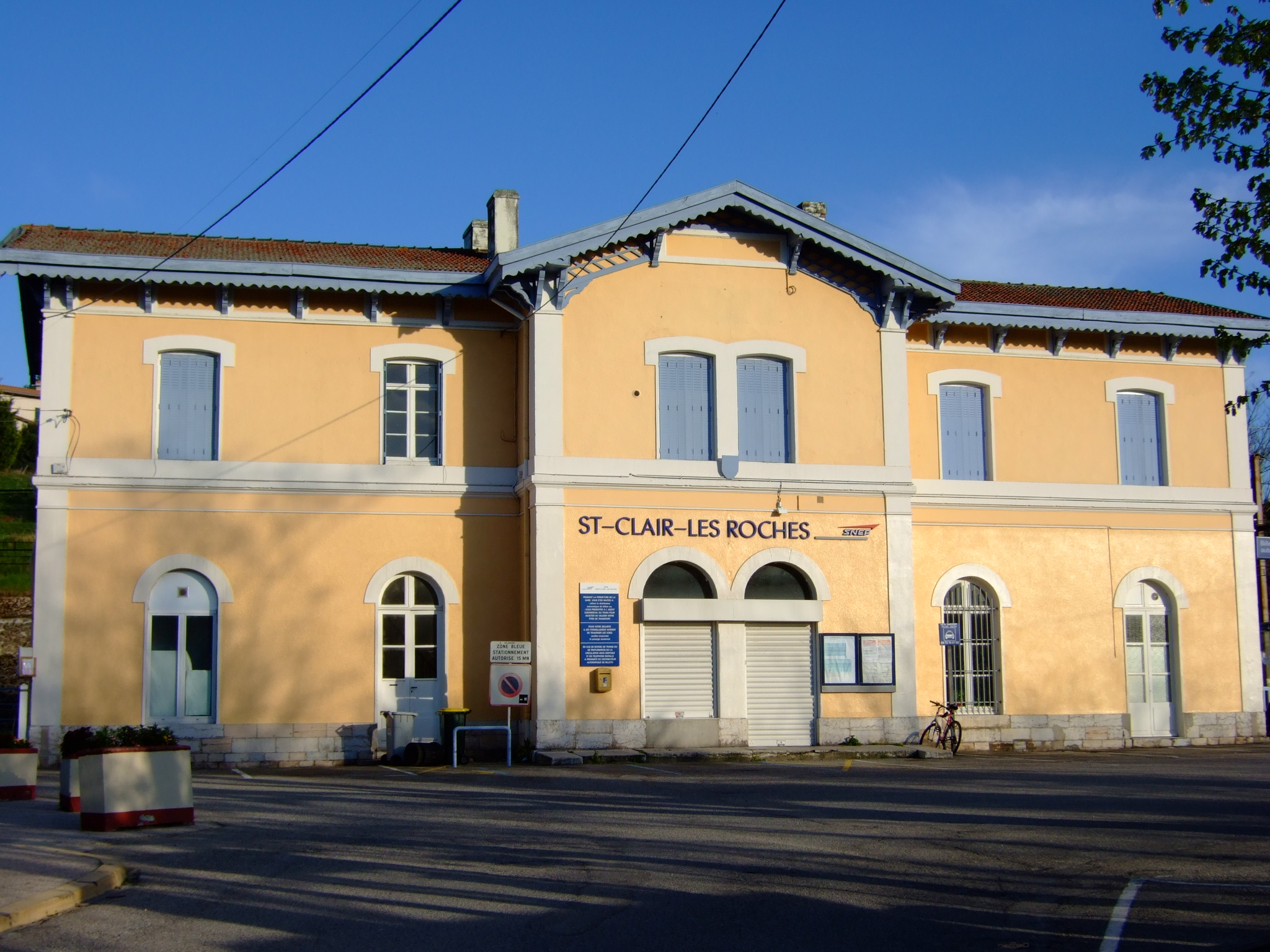
- Train station

- Coat of arms
- Location of Saint-Clair-du-Rhône
- Location within France Location within Auvergne-Rhône-Alpes
- Coordinates: 45°26′27″N 4°46′25″E
- Country: France
- Region: Auvergne-Rhône-Alpes
- Department: Isère
- Arrondissement: Vienne
- Canton: Vienne-2

Government
  - Mayor (2022–2026): Sandrine Lecoutre
- Area^{1}: 7.16 km^{2} (2.76 sq mi)
- Elevation: 162 m (531 ft)
- Highest elevation: 307 m (1,007 ft)
- Lowest elevation: 153 m (502 ft)
- Population (2023): 3,778
  - Density: 528/km^{2} (1,370/sq mi)
- Time zone: UTC+01:00 (CET)
  - Summer (DST): UTC+02:00 (CEST)
- INSEE/Postal code: 38378 /38370
- ^{1} French Land Register data, which excludes lakes, ponds, glaciers > 1 km^{2} (0.386 sq mi or 247 acres) and river estuaries.

Saint-Clair-du-Rhône (French pronunciation: [sɛ̃ klɛːʁ dy ʁon]; literally 'Saint-Clair of the Rhône') is a commune in the Isère department in southeastern France.

== Population ==
Historical population

Year	Pop.	±% p.a.
1800	493	—
1821	570	+0.69%
1846	655	+0.56%
1872	685	+0.17%
1901	511	−1.01%
1926	767	+1.64%
1946	1,359	+2.90%
1962	2,266	+3.25%
1968	2,753	+3.30%

Year	Pop.	±% p.a.
1975	2,650	−0.54%
1982	3,059	+2.07%
1990	3,360	+1.18%
1999	3,605	+0.79%
2007	3,868	+0.88%
2012	3,911	+0.22%
2017	3,817	−0.49%
2023	3,778	−0.17%

Source: EHESS and INSEE (1968-2023)

== Twin towns ==
Saint-Clair-du-Rhône is twinned with:

- Mammola, Italy, since 2010

== See also ==
- Communes of the Isère department
