= Celebret =

Letter that allows a Catholic priest to say Mass

A celebret, in Catholic canon law, is a letter from a bishop or religious superior authorizing a priest to say Mass in a diocese other than his own. The name of the document is taken from the Latin celebret, meaning “may he celebrate”, as it is traditionally the first word of the text therein.

== History ==
The Council of Trent (Sess. XXIII, chap. xvi on Reform) lays down the rule that "no cleric who is a stranger shall without letter commendatory from his own ordinary be admitted by any bishop to celebrate the divine mysteries". Ordinarily, permission is not to be given to a priest from another diocese or archdiocese to say Mass without this certificate signed and duly sealed.

The seal is the more important requisite, as it is the safer guarantee against forgery. The celebret itself should be officially recognized by the diocesan authority of the place where a priest may wish to say Mass. One who has his celebret in due form, or who is certainly known to be in good standing in his own diocese, may be allowed to celebrate until he has had sufficient time to comply with this rule. A priest with proper credentials cannot reasonably be prevented from saying Mass, though he will be expected to comply with reasonable restrictions which may be imposed.

In the United States, the Third Plenary Council of Baltimore, as a regulation against collectors of funds for other dioceses or countries, enacted a decree (No. 295) that priests on such a mission should not be allowed to celebrate Mass even once until they had received permission from the ordinary. This rule has generally been enforced in diocesan synods.

The absence of the celebret does not suffice denial of permission to say Mass, if persons worthy of belief bear positive testimony to the good standing of the priest. If the permission is unreasonably refused, the priest may say Mass privately if no scandal is given. Yet, the rectors of churches are not obliged to incur any expenses the celebration may involve. (S.C.C., 15 December 1703).

== Sources ==
- Instruction Redemptionis Sacramentum (April 23, 2004), Chapter V, 111.
