= Verrières-en-Forez =

- Commune
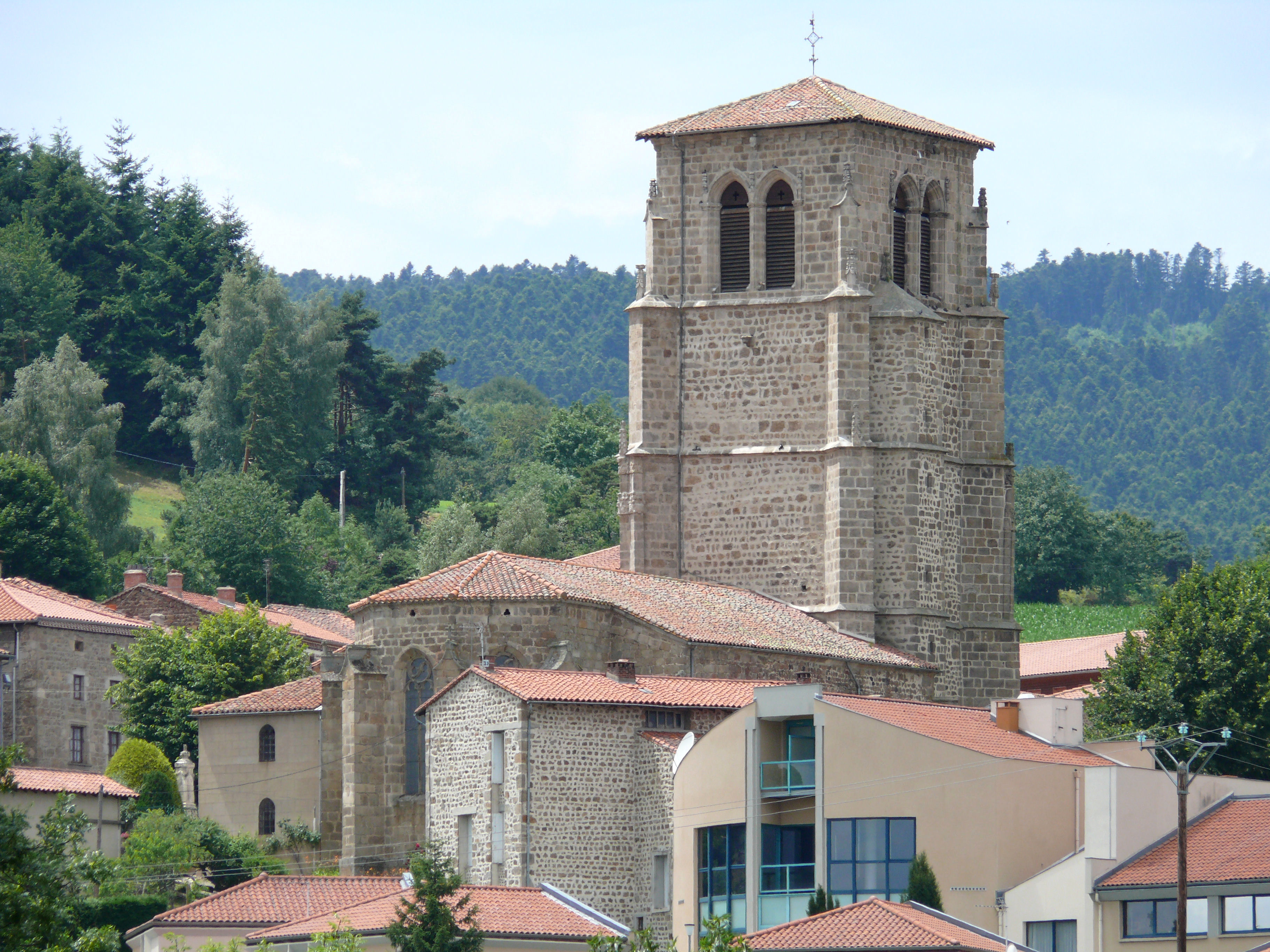

- Coat of arms
- Location of Verrières-en-Forez
- Location within France Location within Auvergne-Rhône-Alpes
- Coordinates: 45°34′18″N 3°59′51″E
- Country: France
- Region: Auvergne-Rhône-Alpes
- Department: Loire
- Arrondissement: Montbrison
- Canton: Montbrison
- Intercommunality: Loire Forez Agglomération

Government
  - Mayor (2020–2026): Hervé Peyronnet
- Area^{1}: 21.17 km^{2} (8.17 sq mi)
- Elevation: 825 m (2,707 ft)
- Highest elevation: 1,272 m (4,173 ft)
- Lowest elevation: 540 m (1,770 ft)
- Population (2023): 731
  - Density: 34.5/km^{2} (89.4/sq mi)
- Time zone: UTC+01:00 (CET)
  - Summer (DST): UTC+02:00 (CEST)
- INSEE/Postal code: 42328 /42600
- ^{1} French Land Register data, which excludes lakes, ponds, glaciers > 1 km^{2} (0.386 sq mi or 247 acres) and river estuaries.

Verrières-en-Forez (French pronunciation: [vɛʁjɛʁ ɑ̃ fɔʁɛ], literally Verrières in Forez) is a commune in the Loire department in central France.

== Population ==
Historical population
Year	Pop.	±% p.a.
1968	512	—
1975	445	−1.98%
1982	445	+0.00%
1990	481	+0.98%
1999	540	+1.29%
2007	629	+1.93%
2012	664	+1.09%
2017	705	+1.21%
2023	731	+0.61%
Source: INSEE

== See also ==
- Communes of the Loire department
