= Fuente =

Fuente, Spanish for "fountain" or "spring", may refer to:

== People ==
- Claire dela Fuente (1958–2021), Filipino singer
- José Manuel Fuente (1945–1996), Spanish road racing cyclist
- Justin Fuente (born 1976), college football coach in U.S.
- Luis La Fuente (born 1947), Peruvian football defender

== Places ==
- Fuente-Álamo, Spain
- Fuente Álamo de Murcia, Spain
- Fuente Carreteros, Córdoba, Spain
- Fuente de Cantos, Badajoz, Spain
- Fuente de Oro, Colombia
- Fuente de Pedro Naharro, Cuenca, Spain
- Fuente de Piedra, Málaga, Spain
- Fuente de Piedra Lagoon, a wetland in Málaga, Spain
- Fuente de Santa Cruz, Segovia, Spain
- Fuente del Arco, Badajoz, Spain
- Fuente del Maestre, Badajoz, Spain
- Fuente el Fresno, Ciudad Real, Spain
- Fuente el Olmo de Fuentidueña, Segovia, Spain
- Fuente el Olmo de Íscar, Segovia, Spain
- Fuente el Saúz, Ávila, Spain
- Fuente el Saz de Jarama, Spain
- Fuente el Sol, Valladolid, Spain
- Fuente Encalada, Zamora, Spain
- Fuente la Lancha, Córdoba, Spain
- Fuente la Reina, Castellón, Spain
- Fuente Obejuna, Córdoba, Spain
- Fuente-Olmedo, Valladolid, Spain
- Fuente Palmera, Spain
- Fuente-Tójar, Spain
- Fuente Vaqueros, Spain
- La Fuente de San Esteban, Salamanca, Spain

== See also ==
- de la Fuente
- Lafuente (disambiguation)
- Fuentes (disambiguation)
