= Fuentes =

Fuentes (meaning "fountains" or "sources" in Spanish) may refer to:

== Places ==
=== Italy ===
- Fort Fuentes, a military fort near Colico, province of Lecco

=== Spain ===
- Fuentes Carrionas, a mountain range belonging to the Cantabrian Mountains

==== Andalusia ====
- Fuentes de Andalucía, a municipality in the province of Seville

==== Aragón ====
- Fuentes Calientes, a municipality in the province of Teruel
- Fuentes Claras, a municipality in the province of Teruel
- Fuentes de Rubielos, a municipality in the province of Teruel
- Fuentes de Ebro, a municipality in the province of Zaragoza
- Fuentes de Jiloca, a municipality in the province of Zaragoza

==== Asturias ====
- Fuentes de Corbeiro, a parish in Cangas del Narcea
- Fuentes del Narcea, Degaña and Ibias Natural Park, a natural park

==== Castile and León ====
- Fuentes de Año, a municipality in the province of Ávila
- Fuentes de Carbajal, a municipality in the province of León
- Fuentes de Nava, a municipality in the province of Palencia
- Fuentes de Valdepero, a municipality in the province of Palencia
- Fuentes de Béjar, a municipality in the province of Salamanca
- Fuentes de Magaña, is a municipality located in the province of Soria Fuentes de Oñoro, a village and municipality in the province of Salamanca
  - Battle of Fuentes de Oñoro, fought 1811 between British-Portuguese and French forces
- Fuentes de Ropel, a municipality in the province of Zamora

==== Castilla-La Mancha ====
- Fuentes, Cuenca, a municipality in the province of Cuenca

==== Extremadura ====
- Fuentes de León, a municipality in the province of Badajoz

==== Valencian Community ====
- Fuentes de Ayódar, a municipality in the province of Castellón, Valencian Community

=== Mexico ===
- Fuentes del Valle, a town in Tultitlán, State of Mexico
  - Fuentes del Valle (Mexibús), a BRT station serving the area
- Las Fuentes (Mexibús), a BRT station in Chimalhuacán, State of Mexico

== Other uses ==
- Fuentes (surname), a Spanish surname
- Discos Fuentes, a record label based in Medellín, Colombia
- Fuentes (spider), a genus of the spider family Salticidae, jumping spiders
