= De la Fuente =

de la Fuente is a Spanish language surname, which means "of the fountain," "of the spring" or "of the source." It may refer to:

== People ==
- Antonio Gutiérrez de la Fuente (1796–1878), Peruvian politician
- Claire de la Fuente (born 1958), Filipino singer
- Cristián de la Fuente (born 1974), Chilean model and actor
- David de la Fuente (born 1981), Spanish cyclist
- David Hernández de la Fuente (born 1974), Spanish writer
- Dianne dela Fuente (born 1981), Filipino newscaster
- Enrique de la Fuente (born 1975), Spanish volleyball player
- Esteban de la Fuente (born 1968), Argentine basketball player
- Félix Rodríguez de la Fuente (1928–1980), Spanish naturalist
- Fernando de la Fuente de la Fuente (1943–1996), Spanish missionary and martyr
- Gertrudis de la Fuente (1921–2017), Spanish biochemist
- Guillermo Jullian de la Fuente (1931–2008), Chilean architect and painter
- Gregorio de la Fuente (1910–1999), Chilean painter and muralist
- Ignacio De La Fuente (born 1949), American politician
- Jerónimo de la Fuente (born 1991), Argentine rugby player
- Joel de la Fuente (born 1969), American actor
- José Ramón de la Fuente (born 1970), Spanish football player and coach
- Juan de la Fuente (born 1976), Argentine sailor
- Juan Ramón de la Fuente (born 1951), Mexican psychiatrist and politician
- Konrad de la Fuente (born 2001), American soccer player
- Luis de la Fuente (1914–1972), Mexican footballer
- Luis de la Fuente (born 1961), Spanish footballer
- Luis Herrera de la Fuente (1916–2014), Mexican musician
- Luis Merlo de la Fuente, Spanish politician
- Luis Solari de la Fuente (born 1948), Peruvian politician
- Ramón de la Fuente Muñiz (1921–2006), Mexican psychiatrist
- Rafael de la Fuente (born 1986), Venezuelan actor and singer
- Rocky De La Fuente (born 1954), American businessman and politician
- Rodrigo de la Fuente (born 1976), Spanish basketball player
- Sergio García de la Fuente (born 1983), Spanish football player
- Vicente Iborra de la Fuente (born 1988), Spanish football player

== Places ==
- Fresno de la Fuente, Segovia, Spain
- Jaramillo de la Fuente, Burgos, Spain
- Parras de la Fuente, Coahuila, Mexico
- Santibáñez de La Fuente, León, Spain
- Valhermoso de la Fuente, Cuenca, Spain
- Villanueva de la Fuente, Spain

== See also ==
- Dellafuente (born 1991), Spanish singer and rapper
- Fuente (disambiguation)
- Lafuente (disambiguation)
