= Cintruénigo =

- Municipality
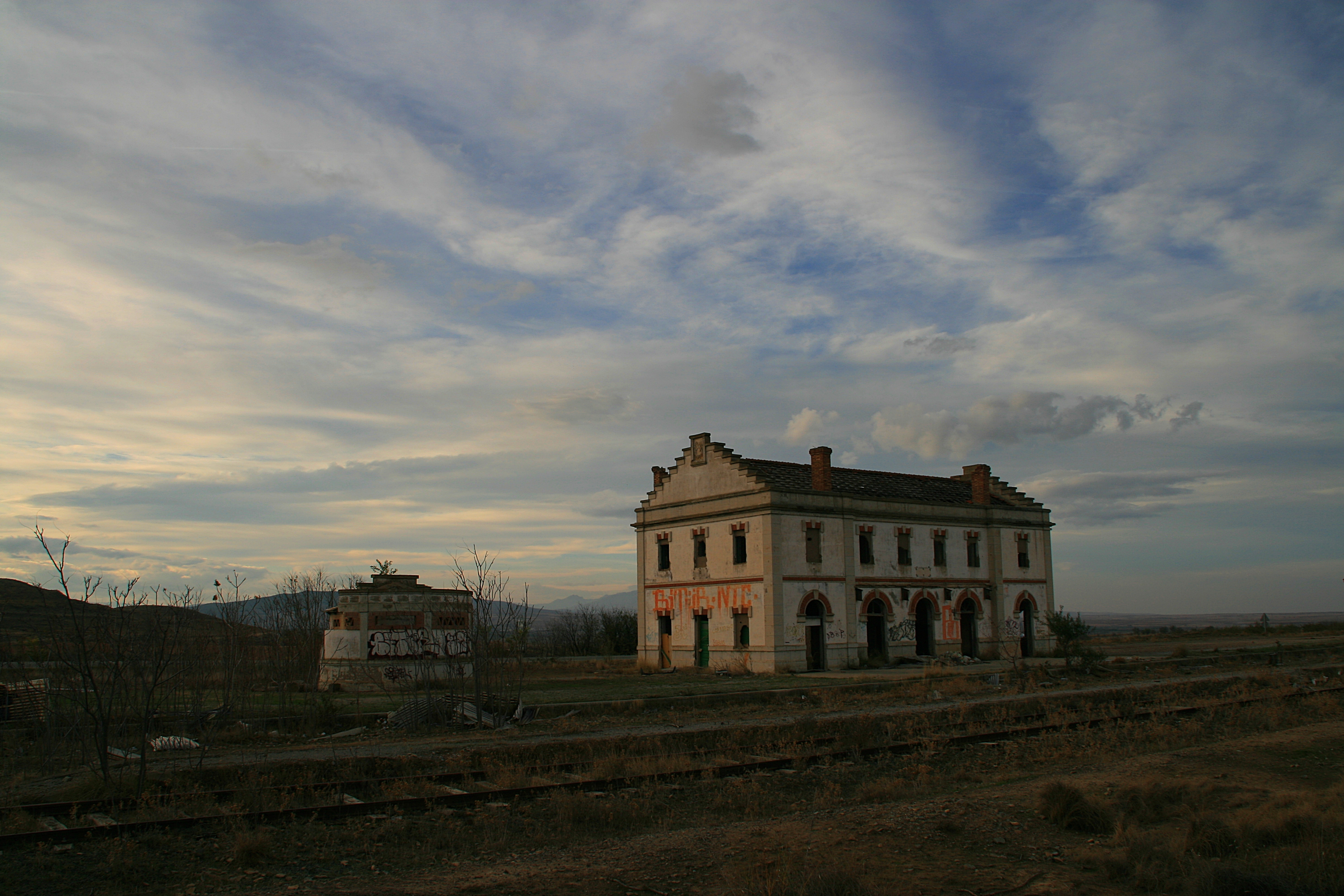
- Railway station in Cintruénigo, Navarra

- Coat of arms

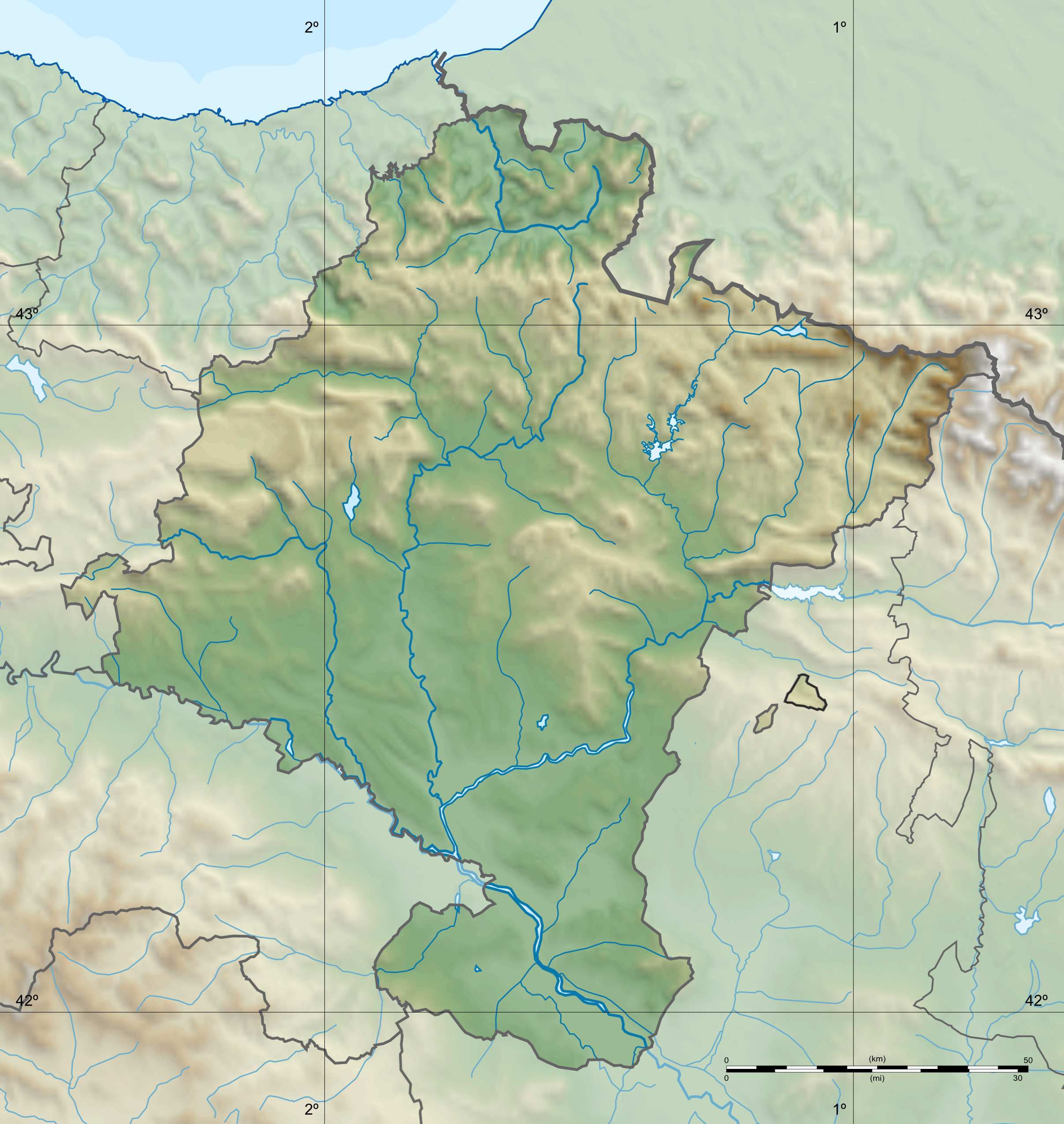
- Location within Navarre Location within Spain
- Coordinates: 42°03′55″N 1°36′24″W
- Country: Spain
- Autonomous community: Navarre

Government
  - Mayor: (Óscar Bea Trincado (Navarrese People's Union))

Area
  - Total: 35.4 km^{2} (13.7 sq mi)
- Elevation: 391 m (1,283 ft)

Population (2025-01-01)
  - Total: 8,565
  - Density: 242/km^{2} (627/sq mi)
- Demonym: Cirbonero
- Time zone: UTC+1 (CET)
  - Summer (DST): UTC+2 (CEST)
- Postal code: 31592
- Area code: Dialing code
- Website: https://www.cintruenigo.com

Cintruénigo is a Spanish town and municipality located in the province and autonomous community of Navarre, northern Spain. Situated in the Merindad de Tudela in the Ribera de Navarra, in the comarca of Tudela in the lower reaches of the Alhama river and 92 km from the capital of the autonomous community, Pamplona. Its population in 2020 was of 8026 according to the Instituto Nacional de Estadistica.

== Demonyms ==
The demonym of Cintruénigo is cirbonero and cirbonera, applicable to the masculine and feminine respectively. This demonym comes from the 16th century in which Cintruénigo had an important increase in population due to inhabitants of the Sorian village of Cerbón, near Fuentes de Magaña also on the Alhama river, moved to Cintruénigo and created a neighbourhood that came to be called El barrio de los Cirboneros. This neighbourhood in time was swallowed by the village proper and the demonym extended to all the inhabitants surviving to the present.

== Geography ==
The village of Cintruénigo is situated in the autonomous community of Navarre within the Ribera de Navarra at an altitude of 391 MSL. Its area is of 35.4 km^{2} and limits to the north and northeast with the municipality of Corella, to the east and south with that of Tudela and to the west with that of Fitero.
