= Gregory Sutton =

Australian convicted child sex abuser and former Marist Brother

- Born: 19 March 1951 (age 75); Wyong, New South Wales, Australia
- Occupation: Marist Brothers
- Known for: Child sexual abuse
- Penalty: 1996: 18 years imprisonment; 2017: 2 years, 2 months suspended sentence; 2025: 15 month suspended sentence

Details
- Date apprehended: 1996, Missouri, United States
- Imprisoned at: Goulburn Correctional Centre

Gregory Joseph Sutton (born 19 March 1951) is an Australian convicted child sexual abuser and former member of the Roman Catholic religious order of the Marist Brothers. Sutton taught in Marist Brother schools in Queensland, New South Wales and Canberra between 1973 and 1987 and has served more than 12 years in prison for 67 offences against children.

In March 2025, Sutton was given a suspended sentence of 15 months for abusing a boy in Innisfail, North Queensland between 1973 and 1975.

The failure of the Marist Brothers to deal with Sutton's prolific offending was examined in Case Study 13 of the Royal Commission into Institutional Responses to Child Sexual Abuse.

== Life and career ==
Gregory Joseph Sutton was born 19 March 1951 and grew up in the Wyong area of New South Wales. Sutton was 16 years old when he joined the Marist Brothers juniorate and took his final vows in 1970. During 1971–1972, he did his scholasticate at the Marist Brothers Champagnat College, Pagewood, New South Wales.

Sutton's younger brother Robert followed him into the Marist Brothers and later became headmaster of Marist Brothers, Hamilton school.

=== Marist Brothers Primary School, Queensland (1973–1976) ===
Sutton's first teaching appointment was Marist Brothers Primary School, Queensland, in 1973. Sutton has not been convicted of any offences relating to this period but the Marist Brothers made payments to two former students who were sexually abused by Sutton. Brother Denis Doherty, who was in charge of primary school students, told the Royal Commission that he became uneasy about Sutton's interactions with students.

Sutton asked Doherty for permission to take children to a holiday house at Mission Beach, Queensland. Doherty refused because he was worried for the children's safety. Doherty took his concerns to the provincial Brother Charles Howard, telling him he suspected Sutton was "interfering with children". Howard wrote to Doherty to reassure him they would deal with Sutton. Doherty assumed this meant he would be counselled and closely observed.

=== Sacred Heart Primary School, Mosman, Sydney (1976–1978) ===
In 1976, Sutton was transferred to Sacred Heart Primary School, Mosman, New South Wales. In 1996 he was convicted of 12 child sex offences against four boys at the school.

=== Marist Brothers Primary School, Eastwood, Sydney (1978–1980) ===
In January 1978, Sutton was transferred to Marist Brothers Primary School, Eastwood, Sydney. In 1996, he was convicted of 10 offences against four children at the school. The community superior, Brother John Callaghan, said Sutton appeared more immature than his colleagues, citing a model train set Sutton kept in his classroom.

=== Marist College Junior School, Canberra (1980–1983) ===
In January 1980, Sutton was transferred to Marist College Junior School, Canberra until the end of the 1982 school year. Sutton was not convicted of any offences relating to his time at this school but in civil proceedings brought against the Marist Brothers, eight former students alleged Sutton sexually abused them. At the beginning of 1983, Sutton was transferred from Canberra to St Thomas More Primary School, Campbelltown. In 1996, he was convicted of 18 offences committed against two girls and one boy.

=== St Carthage's Primary School, Lismore (1983–1987) ===
St Carthage's Primary School in Lismore was run by the Presentation Sisters and teachers were provided by the Marist Brothers. In 1996, Sutton was convicted of 25 offences against 2 girls and 3 boys. In November 1986, Sutton was sent to Marcellin Hall, Auckland to participate in a "personal renewal" course. Sutton told the Royal Commission the course taught him "more appropriate adult intimacy".

Around Easter 1987, Sutton, O'Grady and Duroux took Year 5 classes on an overnight camp. Due to inclement weather, the camp was abandoned. Sutton did not return to school that day. O'Grady checked Sutton's diary and noted that the entry for the school camp read "Picked up (named redacted). What an arvo. She is magnificent." and "I had a fight with (name redacted) and then we made up."

O'Grady complained to John Kelly, director of the Lismore Catholic Education Office. Kelly formed the opinion that Sutton's behaviour was far more serious than professional negligence but did not report Sutton to the police. Instead he contacted the provincial of the Marist Brothers, Brother Dwyer. On 30 April 1987, Sutton was finally removed from St Carthage's and placed on "administrative leave" – a known euphemism within the Catholic Church for concealing the sexual abuse of children by a member of the clergy.

On 4 July 1987, the Marist Brothers provincial council met in Drummoyne to discuss Sutton, who they had sent to Melbourne for therapy. The note that Sutton "does not wish at this stage to be involved with children or schools". Sutton was placed in the Marist Brothers house in Drummoyne, where he performed general duties.

=== Police investigation ===
In April 1989, Brother Holdsworth became aware of the suicide of a boy Sutton had sexually abused at the North Queensland school. The boy's father told Holdsworth his son had disclosed that Sutton had "interfered" with him. The father asked Holdsworth to accompany him to confront Sutton. Holdsworth accompanied the father to Sutton's residence in Hunter's Hill, Sydney.

Holdsworth's evidence to the Royal Commission was that Sutton confessed to the boy's father that he had sexually abused his son. Holdsworth conceded he was not sure he understood that, in 1989, committing a sexual act upon a child was a crime. The boy's father expressed concern that other children may have been sexually abused by Sutton.

On 11 July 1989, the New South Wales Department of Community Services received a risk of harm report concerning alleged child abuse by a Marist Brother at St Thomas More Primary School, Campbelltown, in 1984. Detective Senior Constable Donna Lawrence took statements from two school girls, alleging numerous sexual offences by Sutton against them.

On 15 August 1989, the director of the Southdown Institute in Ontario, Canada, wrote to Sutton stating that he would be participating in their assessment program from 27 August to 1 September 1989. Apart from being sent to Southdown, no other disciplinary action was taken against Sutton by the Marist Brothers.

=== Marist Brothers cover-up ===
Brother Turton told Sutton NSW Police had started an investigation into Sutton's offending in Campbelltown and directed him to leave the Australia. Sutton left three days later and travelled to a Marist Brothers residence in Chicago. After seven days, Sutton travelled to the Southdown Institute in Ontario, Canada.

As NSW Police began their investigation, Detective Lawrence was told Sutton had gone overseas. Lawrence told the Royal Commission she speculated someone had tipped off the Marist Brothers that NSW police were investigating Sutton.

During his hearing at the Royal Commission, Turton was asked if he had been tipped off about the NSW Police investigation by Brother Philip Slattery. Turton could not recall such a phone call and denied directing Sutton to leave Australia. Sutton told the Commission that Turton had told him he had received a telephone call from Brother Philip Slattery, principal of Eagle Vale primary school.

In December 2017, Slattery pleaded guilty to four counts of indecent assault against two students.

== Southdown Institute ==
A clinical report, dated 7 December 1989, acknowledges that Sutton was referred to the Southdown Institute "because of sexual abuse of children". It states that shortly before Sutton arrived at Southdown, a police investigation had begun. Sutton told his assessor that when Brother Turton was made aware of the police investigation, he directed Sutton to leave Australia and sent him to Canada.

The Southdown Institute assessment confirmed Sutton was a paedophile with obsessive–compulsive personality disorder.

== Bart memo ==
Evidence presented to the Royal Commission, including a document entitled "Confidential information regarding 'Frater Bartholomew' for Mr Tony Carroll of Carrol and O'Dea dated 20 August 1989." The document set out the career of "Bart" as a Marist Brother and teacher since 1969, including allegations of child sexual abuse from a school. In evidence, Brother Turton agreed the subject of the memo was in fact Gregory Sutton. The Commission found the document was intended to conceal the fact the Marist Brothers were aware of serious allegations about Sutton.

== United States and extradition ==
When Sutton's treatment ended in July 1990, he applied for dispensation from the Marist Brothers. This was granted in October 1991. Sutton signed to study at Loyola University Chicago and resided at the Marist Brothers Chicago community. In early 1992, Brother Turton called Sutton and told him NSW Police in Lismore had notified him that a court had issued an arrest warrant. Sutton asked Turton for advice and said that Turton told him to "stay there and live your life".

Sutton spoke to Brother Sean Sammon, the Marist Brother provincial in New York for advice. Sutton alleged that Sammon repeated what Turton had said and that he should remain in the United States. In October 1992, Sutton married his former psychiatrist and became the administrative non-teaching principal of St Dismas Elementary School, Florissant, Missouri. He held this job for two years. Sutton received a letter from Turton saying he should not be teaching in schools.

In 1995, Detective Sergeant Wayne Magann joined an investigation involving alleged sexual assaults on former students of St Carthage's Primary School, Lismore. Magann traced Sutton to Chicago and requested an arrest warrant. Magnann contacted Detective Donna Lawrence and informed her Sutton had been located. On 15 August 1995, two US federal marshalls arrested Sutton in Missouri and charged him with 24 alleged sexual offences against 7 of his former students in Australia. On 18 August, Sutton appeared before US Magistrate Judge David Noce.

Despite an attempt to appeal the extradition, the Supreme Court of the United States ruled against him and Sutton was extradited to Australia on 29 April 1996. Magnann took Sutton to Sydney Police Centre, where Sutton was charged and bail refused. On 26 May 1996, Sutton was charged with 39 additional offences and during the interview confessed to the crimes he had been extradited for and revealed further offences against 9 additional children.

== 1996 trial and imprisonment ==
On 2 August 1996, Sutton pleaded guilty to a total of 67 child sex offences in relation to 15 students at schools in New South Wales:

- 13 counts of sexual intercourse with a child under 16 years
- 53 counts of indecent assault or an act of indecency
- One count of gross indecency

Sutton was sentenced on 8 November 1996 to 18 years imprisonment, with a minimum term of 13 1/2 years. In December 2000, his sentence was reduced on appeal to 15 years, with a minimum of 12 years. In total, Sutton has been the subject of allegations of child sexual abuse by 27 of his former students. A Non-Publication Order was granted and remained in place until Sutton gave evidence at the Royal Commission into Institutional Responses to Child Sexual Abuse in 2014.

An appeal was rejected on 6 December 2000 in the NSW Court of Criminal Appeal. Sutton spent a decade on strict non-association confinement at Goulburn Correctional Centre before being transferred to the CUBIT program at Long Bay. Following the successful completion of the CUBIT program, Sutton was released from prison on 4 April 2008.

== Royal Commission into Institutional Responses to Child Sexual Abuse ==
On 1 July 2014, Sutton was called to give evidence to the Royal Commission into Institutional Responses to Child Sexual Abuse. Sutton told the commission that Brother Alexis Turton told him he was under investigation by NSW Police and directed him to leave the country.

The commission findings included:

- 154 Marist Brothers were officially accused of child sexual abuse in Australia between 1980 and 2015.
- 20% of the Marist Brothers between 1950 and 2010 were paedophiles.
- Claims of abuse against the Marist Brothers account for a quarter of all claims received by religious institutions.
- 486 people made a claim of abuse against the Marist Brothers between 1980 and 2015.
- The average age of claimants at the time of their abuse was 12.

An internal Marist Brothers document showed that at least 10 Marist Brothers had admitted their sexual offending to Brother Turton. Turton told the commission he had talked to 52 of the 154 alleged offenders between 1989 and 2012. The commission revealed that the Marist Brothers had used special codes for alleged offenders in their internal communications.

In 2017, Sutton was given a suspended sentence of two years and two months for offences against two Canberra boys in the 1980s. Sutton pleaded guilty in the ACT Supreme Court but could not be charged because of a statute of limitations.

The Marist Brothers provided the royal commission with a summary of all claims for compensation or redress concerning child sexual abuse by Sutton.

In total, the Marist Brothers received 21 claims with respect to Sutton. Of the 21 claims:

- Eight were from former students of Marist College Canberra.
- The Marist Brothers paid a total of $1,817,811 to claimants
- Seventeen claims were settled out of court, with an average settlement amount of $105,459.47
- Two claims were processed under Towards Healing, with one claimant receiving a financial payment of $25,000

The legal costs for claims settled by the Marist Brothers were $62,545.24 (plus $15,337.99 in disbursements) for civil claims concerning Sutton.

The legal costs of Catholic Church Insurance were $250,888.25 for civil claims concerning Sutton.

== See also ==
- Catholic Church child sexual abuse cases
