= St. Agnes Boys High School =

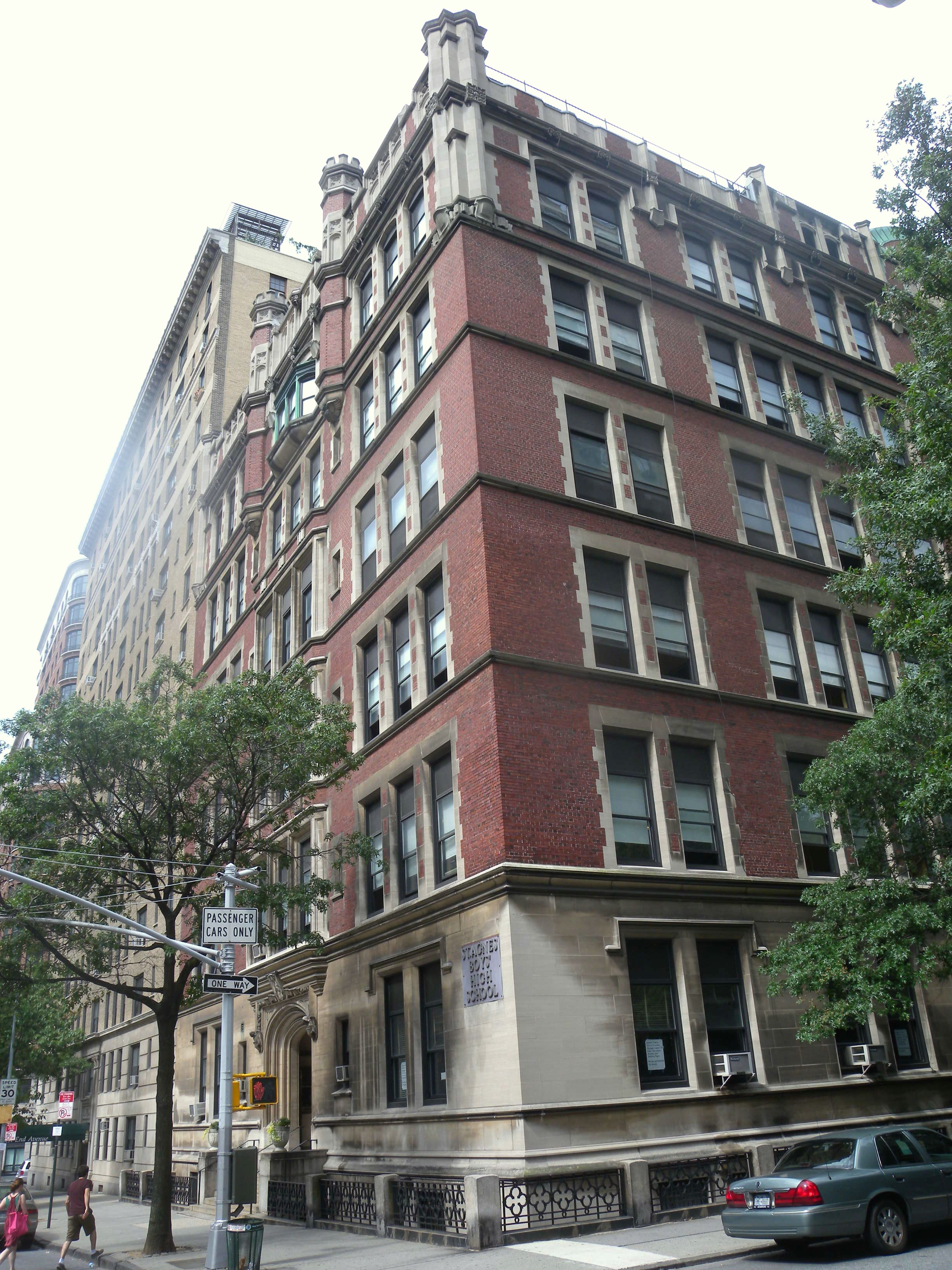

Location
- 555 West End Avenue; New York City (Upper West Side, Manhattan), New York 10024; United States; 40°47′22″N 73°58′40″W

Information
- Type: Private, all-male
- Motto: "Virtus Valet" ('Character and Strength')
- Religious affiliations: Roman Catholic; Marist Brothers
- Established: 1914
- Closed: 2013
- CEEB code: 333935
- Principal: Robert Conte
- Faculty: 22
- Grades: 9–12
- Average class size: 25
- Colors: Maroon and white
- Slogan: "The Streets Stop Here"
- Team name: Stags
- Accreditation: Middle States Association of Colleges and Schools
- Tuition: $6,250 (2009–2010)
- Website: www.staghs.org

Saint Agnes Boys High School was a small, all-boys, private Catholic high school on the Upper West Side of Manhattan in New York City. It was run by the Marist Brothers in conjunction with the Archdiocese of New York. The mascot of St. Agnes was the stag.

== History ==
St. Agnes was located on West End Avenue at West 87th Street. Students from all five boroughs of New York City were enrolled at St. Agnes.

The original high school building was located on East 44th Street between Lexington and Third Avenue, directly behind St. Agnes Church on 43rd Street. St. Agnes later relocated its school to the Upper West Side. The West 87th Street school closed in June 2013. The plight of the private Catholic school closures in the New York City area was covered in The New York Times, the New York Daily News, and CBS News.

In 2014 the building was bought by architect/developer Cary Tamarkin to be converted into luxury housing.

== Academics ==
The Advanced Placement Program allowed high school students to earn college credits. St. Agnes offered Advanced Placement courses in American history, English, studio art, and Spanish. It also offered elective courses in a variety of disciplines to students in their junior and senior years.

== Notable alumni ==
- William G. Parrett, former CEO of Deloitte
- Seán Sammon, superior general of the Marist Brothers order between 2001 and 2009
