= Lafuente =

Lafuente, Spanish for "the fountain", may refer to:

== People ==
- Lafuente (footballer, 1907-1973), Spanish footballer
- Abelardo Lafuente García-Rojo (1871-1931), Spanish architect and entrepreneur
- Ander Lafuente (born 1983), Spanish football midfielder
- Andoni Lafuente (born 1865), Spanish cyclist
- David Lafuente (born 1982), Spanish comic book artist
- Iñaki Lafuente (born 1976), Spanish football goalkeeper
- Senel (born 1984), full name José Manuel Lafuente Garrido, Spanish football forward
- Marta Lafuente (born 1968), Paraguayan psychologist and politician
- Sonia Lafuente (born 1991), Spanish figure skater
- Guitarricadelafuente (born 1997), full name Álvaro Lafuente Calvo, Spanish singer and guitarist

== Places ==
- Lafuente, Cantabria, a locality in the municipality of Lamasón, Spain

== See also ==
- Fuente (disambiguation)
- De La Fuente (disambiguation)
