= Fuentes de Año =

- Municipality
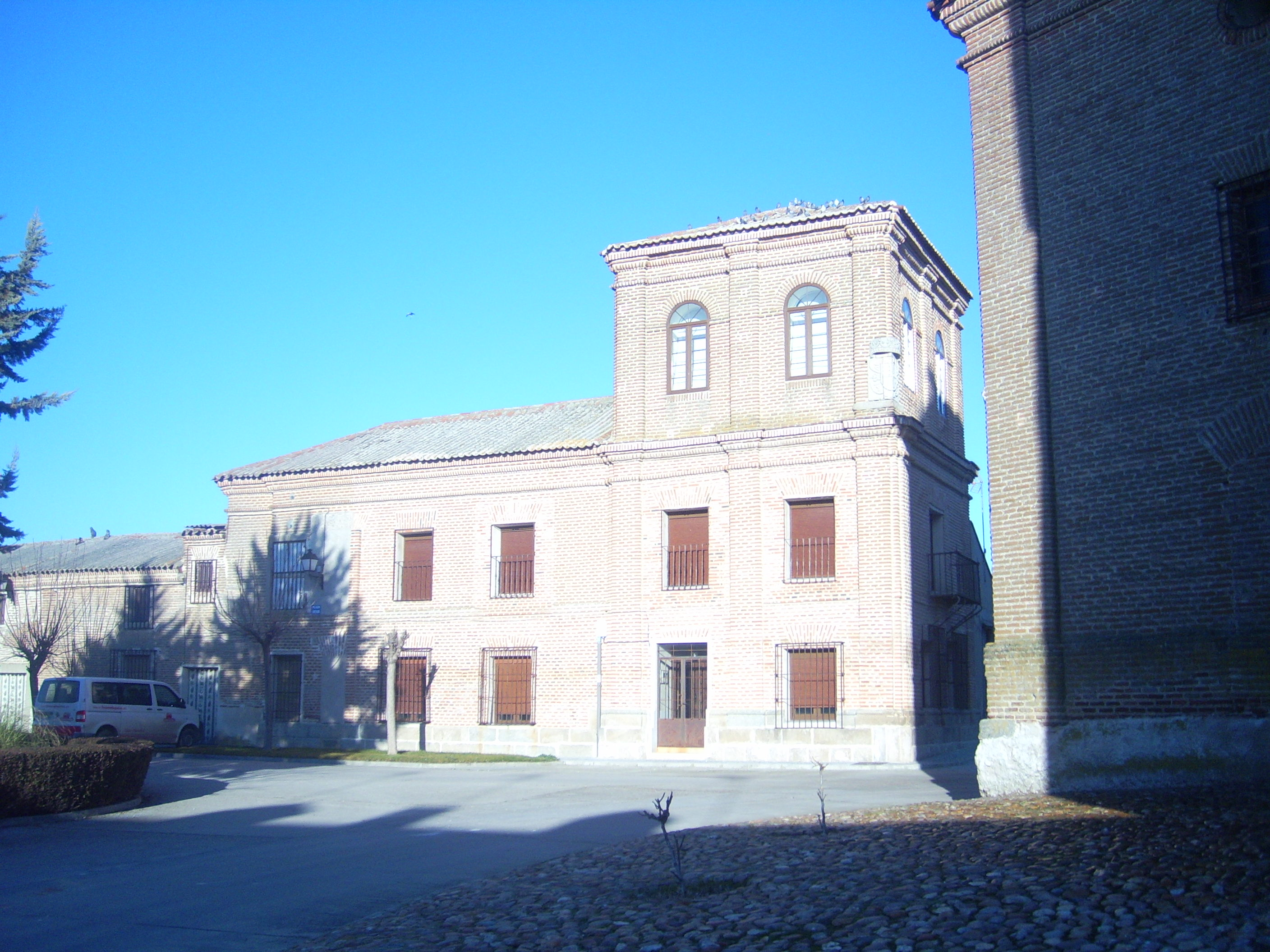
- Palace of the Count of Valdelágila in Fuentes de Año

- Flag Coat of arms

- Location in Spain. Fuentes de Año (Spain)
- Coordinates: 41°01′02″N 4°53′55″W
- Country: Spain
- Autonomous community: Castile and León
- Province: Ávila
- Municipality: Fuentes de Año

Area
  - Total: 20 km^{2} (7.7 sq mi)

Population (2025-01-01)
  - Total: 90
  - Density: 4.5/km^{2} (12/sq mi)
- Time zone: UTC+1 (CET)
  - Summer (DST): UTC+2 (CEST)
- Website: Official website

Fuentes de Año (Spanish pronunciation: [ˈfwentes ðe ˈaɲo]) is a municipality located in the province of Ávila, Castile and León, Spain.

== Population ==
Historical population
Year	Pop.	±% p.a.
2023	158	—
2024	151	−4.43%
2025	146	−3.31%
Source: INE
