= Seán Sammon =

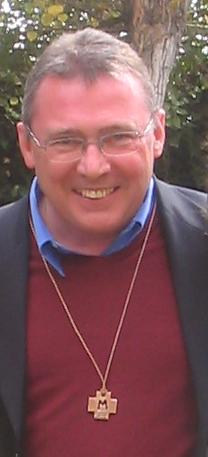
- Brother Seán Sammon, in year 2007 at Santiago de Chile
- Born: Seán Sammon; November 26, 1947
- Died: September 9, 2022 (aged 74)

Brother Seán Sammon, F.M.S. (November 26, 1947 – September 9, 2022) was the former Superior General of the Marist Brothers order, a role he held from October 3, 2001, until 2009.

== Biography ==
Brother Seán's parents were immigrants to the United States, his father from Ireland, his mother from England. He attended the Marist-run St. Agnes Boys High School, and continued on to the juniorate in Cold Spring-on-Hudson, New York. His novitiate was made in Tyngsborough, Massachusetts, and in 1967 he pronounced his first vows.

=== Education ===
In 1970 Brother Seán graduated from Marist College in Poughkeepsie. He taught at his alma mater while studying at The New School where he earned a Master's degree in 1973. In 1982 he received a doctorate in clinical psychology from Fordham University. In 1978 he was invited to be a staff member at the House of Affirmation, a renewal and rehabilitation center in Massachusetts, and was named its International Clinical Director in 1982, a position he held until 1987. He was a licensed psychologist in the State of New York and was a member of the National Register of Health Care Providers.

== Books ==
He has published 10 books and multiple articles on topics of religious life and psychology. He was named provincial of the Poughkeepsie Province in 1987 and was elected president of the Conference of Major Superiors of Men Religious of the US. He has been Vicar General of the Marist Brothers since 1993. He was elected Superior General of the Marist Brothers on October 3, 2001, a position he held until 2009. After returning back to the United States, Brother Seán was appointed the Scholar in Residence at Marist College in Poughkeepsie, NY.

== Honors ==
In 2009 he received the title of Doctor honoris causa, from the Catholic Pontifical University of Paraná, Brazil.

== See also ==
- Charles Howard
