= Fuente el Saúz =

- Municipality
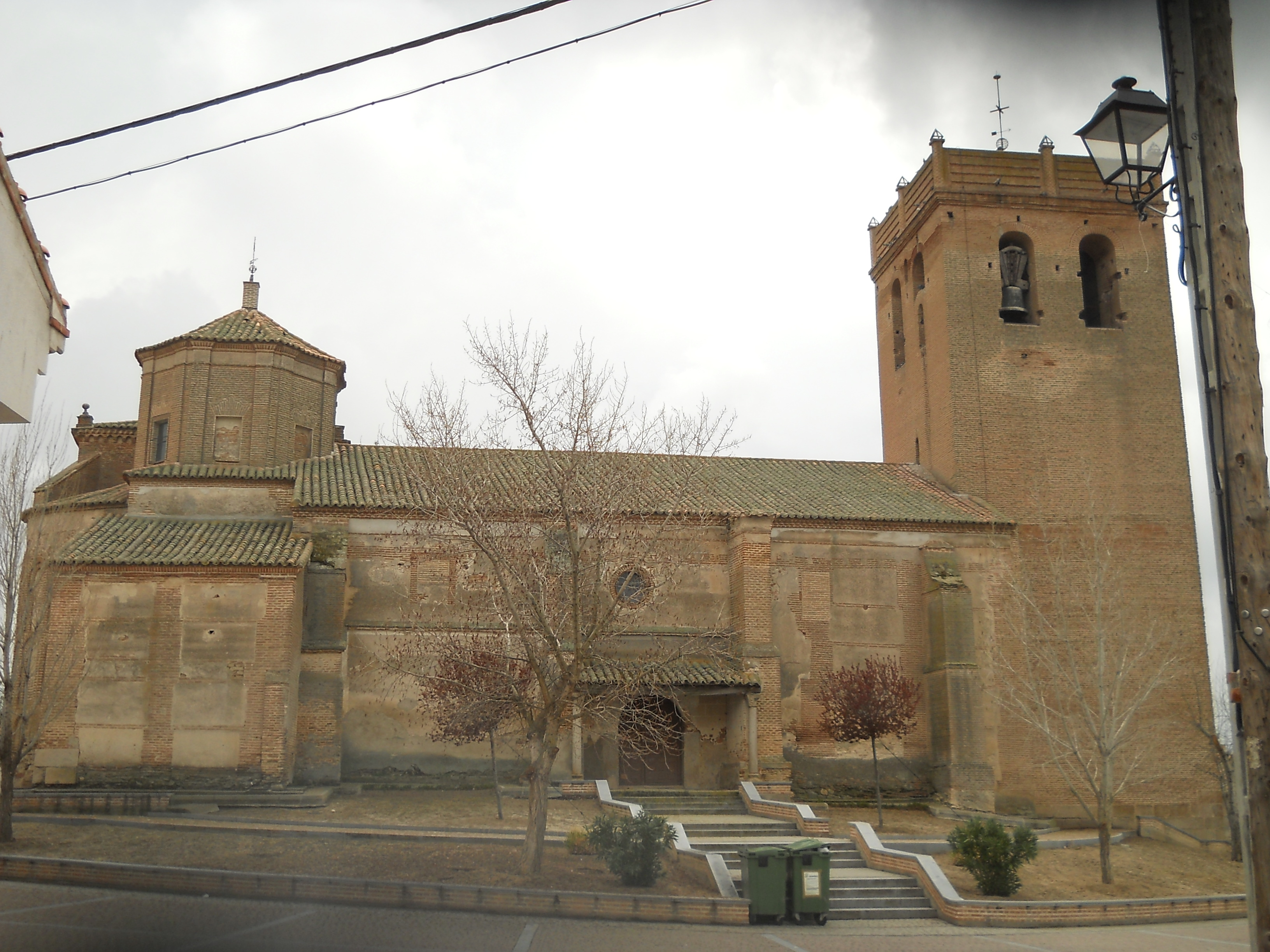
- Church of Our Lady of the Assumption

- Flag Coat of arms

- Location in Spain. Fuente el Saúz (Spain)
- Coordinates: 40°58′39″N 4°54′32″W
- Country: Spain
- Autonomous community: Castile and León
- Province: Ávila
- Municipality: Fuente el Saúz

Area
  - Total: 9.81 km^{2} (3.79 sq mi)
- Elevation: 876 m (2,874 ft)

Population (2025-01-01)
  - Total: 146
  - Density: 14.9/km^{2} (38.5/sq mi)
- Time zone: UTC+1 (CET)
  - Summer (DST): UTC+2 (CEST)
- Website: Official website

Fuente el Saúz is a municipality located in the province of Ávila, Castile and León, Spain.

== Population ==
Historical population
Year	Pop.	±% p.a.
2023	158	—
2024	151	−4.43%
2025	146	−3.31%
Source: INE
