= Marist Brothers =

Consecrated religious congregation in the Catholic Church

- Named after: Blessed Virgin Mary
- Formation: 2 January 1817; 209 years ago
- Founder: St. Marcellin Champagnat
- Founded at: Lyon, France
- Type: Lay Religious Congregation of Pontifical Right (for Men)
- Legal status: Active
- Purpose: To educate young neglected people
- Headquarters: Piazzale Marcellino Champagnat 2, C.P. 10250, 00144 Roma, Italy
- Region served: Global
- Members: 3,046 members (2026)
- Secretary General: Peter Gerald Carroll, F.M.S.
- Superior general: Peter Gerald Carroll, F.M.S.
- Motto: Latin: Ad Jesum per Mariam; English: "To Jesus through Mary"
- Parent organization: Catholic Church
- Website: www.champagnat.org
- Formerly called: Little Brothers of Mary

The Marist Brothers of the Schools, commonly known as simply the Marist Brothers, is an international community of Catholic religious institute of brothers. In 1817, Marcellin Champagnat, a Marist priest from France, founded the Marist Brothers with the goal of educating young people, especially those most neglected. While most of the brothers minister in school settings, others work with young people in parishes, religious retreats, spiritual accompaniment, at-risk youth settings, young adult ministry, and overseas missions.

== History ==
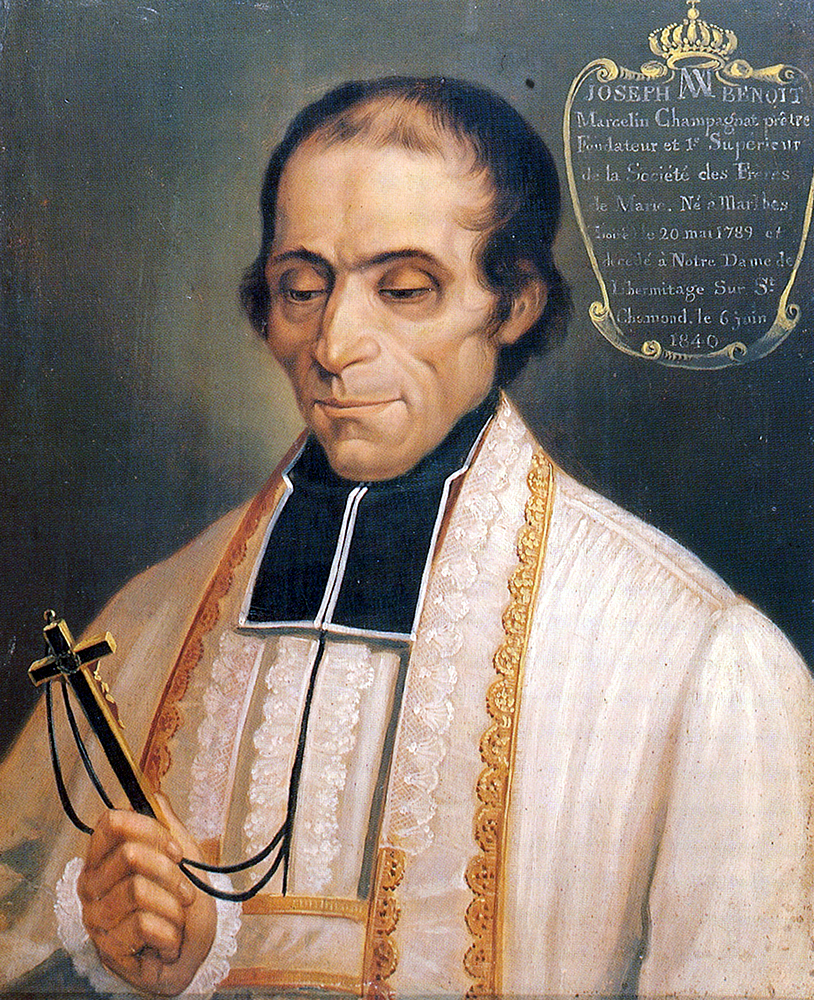
Saint Marcellin Champagnat, founder of the Marist Brothers

St. Marcellin Champagnat decided to start an institute of consecrated brothers in the Marist tradition, building schools for the underprivileged where they might learn to become "Good Christians and Good people". The decision was inspired by an event, when as a parish priest he was called to administer the last rites to a dying boy named Jean Baptiste Montagne. Trying to lead the boy through his last moments in prayer, Marcellin was struck by the fact that the young man had no gauge of Christianity or prayer. From that moment, Champagnat decided to start training brothers to meet the faith needs of the young people of France.

On January 2, 1817, the 23-year-old Jean Marie Granjon and Jean Baptist Audras, fourteen and a half years of age, moved into the small house that Fr. Champagnat had rented for them in La Valla and which became the first Marist Brothers community. Their day consisted of prayer, work and study; their manual work was to make nails, an activity that helped to pay expenses. Marcellin taught them reading and writing, and he looked after their formation as religious educators. Other young men joined the undertaking, among them Gabriel Rivat who, as Brother François, would later become the Brothers' first Superior General.

As a Marist priest, Champagnat had a particular affinity for the Blessed Virgin Mary, so upon conception of the idea of Marist Brothers, Champagnat chose to call his brothers Petits Frères de Marie (Little Brothers of Mary), emphasising the meekness and humbleness he wished them to pursue, and seeking their consecration to her as an exemplar of fidelity to Christ. In 1863, 23 years after Champagnat's death, the Marist Brothers institute received the approbation of the Holy See, whereupon the order received the title of Fratres Maristae a Scholis (Marist Brothers of the Schools), hence the post-nominal letters of FMS. They received a particular mandate to follow the Marist Fathers to the Pacific and administer to the new colonies of the Pacific nations and Australia. This harkens back to a Marist legend about Champagnat.

A favourite maxim of St. Marcellin was that he wanted "to make Jesus known and loved" throughout the world, and to demonstrate he would run a needle through an apple (representing the earth) as an example of how he wanted the message of "Ad Jesum per Mariam" or "To Jesus through Mary" to cross the globe. The end of the needle came out in what would be the equivalent of the Pacific in relation to France where he inserted the needle, and so thus the Marist Brothers have a presence throughout the Pacific, including in Australia and New Zealand.

== International provinces ==
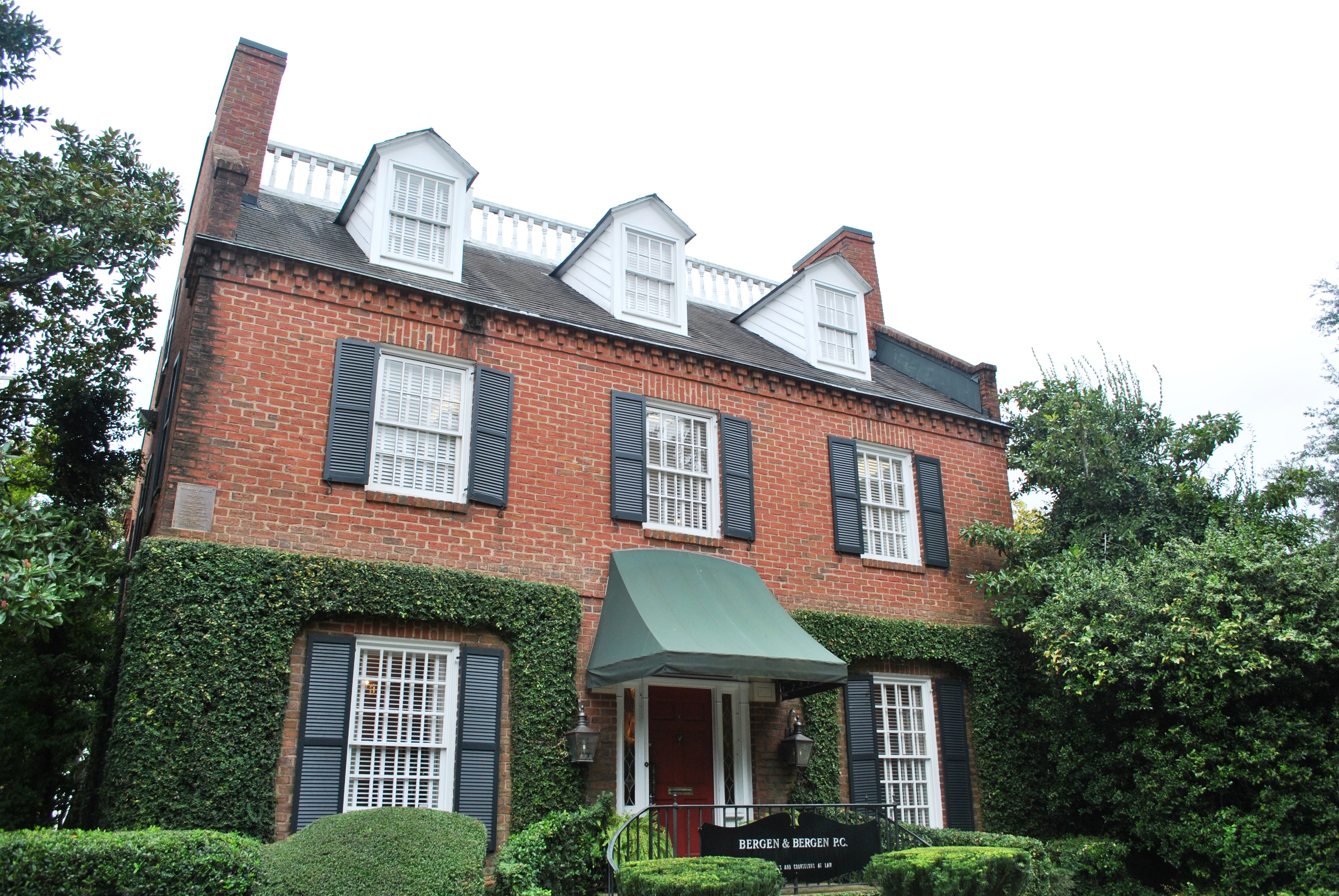
Marist Place, site of the Marist School for Boys, 1919–1939

The Marist Brothers are involved in educational work throughout the world and now conduct primary, secondary and higher education schools, academies, industrial schools, orphanages and retreat houses in 79 countries on five continents: Europe, Africa, Americas, Asia, and Oceania.

From their roots in Lyon, the Brothers today have spread across the globe. Over their 200-year history, Marist Brothers have had ministries in over 100 different nations. There are approximately 2,500 brothers in 79 countries on 5 continents, working directly and sharing their mission and spirituality with more than 72,000 lay Marists, and together educating close to 654,000 children and young people.

Br. Ernesto Sánchez Barba, F.M.S., is the current superior general of the Marist Brothers (Institute of the Marist Brothers of the Schools). He was elected during the XXII General Chapter in Rionegro, Colombia, on 3 October 2017 Together with the vicar general and a general council, it is his responsibility to guide the growth, mission, and administration of the institute's ministries worldwide. This leadership team is based at the General House in Rome, which serves as the central administrative and spiritual hub for the Marist Brothers.

The institute is divided into two main types of administrative units:

- Provinces – Larger regions, each overseen by a provincial, who governs in the name of the superior general. Provincials are responsible for the pastoral care of the Brothers and the oversight of Marist ministries within their territory.
- Districts – Smaller units, often geographically or numerically limited missions, that could be dependent on a bigger province or semi-autonomous. These are typically led by a district leader, with similar responsibilities, but on a smaller scale.

The number of provinces is 23 and districts are 3.

=== Asia ===
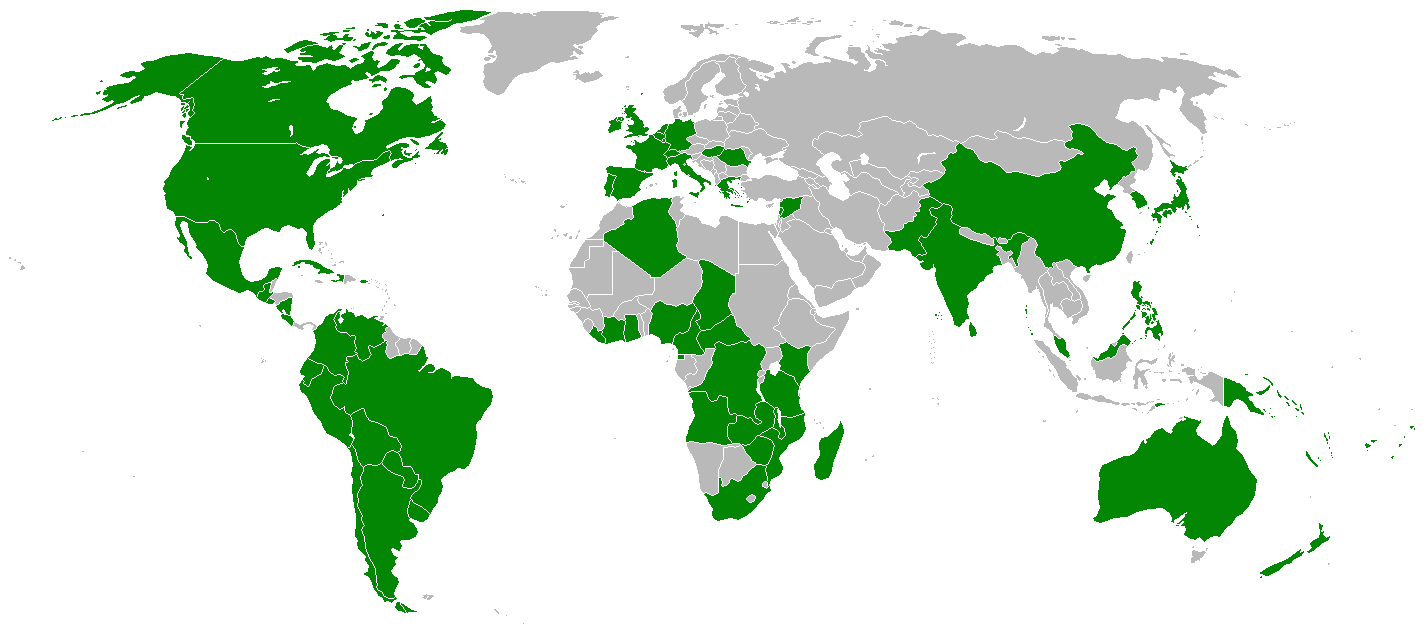
A map of the world showing countries where the Marist Brothers operate in green

- Mission Ad Gentes Marist District of Asia (Thailand, Bangladesh, Cambodia, parts of India, and the Philippines)
- Province of East Asia (Philippines, Hong Kong, South Korea, Malaysia, Singapore, and Japan).
- Province of South Asia (parts of India, Pakistan, and Sri Lanka)

=== Oceania ===
The Marist Brothers' first international missionary mandate was to the Pacific, where they accompanied Marist Fathers in evangelizing and education ministries. Today, Marist brothers own and run many technical colleges in the Central and Western Pacific, educating young men in nations ravaged by war (such as the Solomon Islands and Papua New Guinea).

Marist Brothers arrived in Australia in 1872, where they opened their first school at The Rocks, New South Wales. There are now over 300 Brothers working with young people in schools as teachers and administrators, in retreat houses and camps for young people and in other areas of ministry. Australian Marist Brothers also serve in welfare ministries working with young adults in outreach programs in indigenous Australian communities and also in missions in nearby Papua New Guinea, Bougainville, Solomon Islands, and East Timor. Marists from Australia also serve communities in Cambodia and India. The two provinces of Melbourne (States of Victoria, WA, South Australia and Northern Territory) and Sydney (Queensland, New South Wales, ACT and Cambodia) recombined in 2012. The number of Marist Brothers in Australian is diminishing and very few continue to teach in the Marist schools, which are now led and staffed predominantly by lay teachers; however, such schools are described as being in the "Marist tradition" as they continue to follow the educational principles of the Marist Brothers.

Since 2022, Oceania is aggregated into one province:

- Star of Sea Province: Australia, Cambodia, New Zealand, Timor-Leste, Fiji, Samoa, Salomon Islands, Papua New Guinea, Kiribati, Vanuatu and New Caledonia

=== Europe and North Africa ===
The Marist mission originated in Europe, particularly in France, which Marcellin Champagnat called home. A number of schools, universities, youth ministries and social works are done by the Marists in this area. The administration of European Marists is overseen by the provinces of:

- Province of Compostela (Spain and Portugal)
- Province of West Central Europe (Belgium, Germany, Ireland, Netherlands and United Kingdom)
- Province of Iberia (Spain and Romania)
- Province de l'Hermitage (Algeria, Spain, France, Greece, Hungary and Switzerland)
- Mediterranean Province (Spain, Italy, Lebanon and Syria)

In Scotland, Celtic Football Club was formed at a meeting in St. Mary's church hall in Glasgow, by Marist Brother Walfrid on November 6, 1887. The stated purpose, according to the official club records, was "to alleviate poverty in Glasgow's East End parishes". The charity established by Brother Walfrid was named 'The Poor Children's Dinner Table'.

=== North America ===
The North American provinces are particularly based around secondary and tertiary education. The North American provinces are:

- Province of Canada
- Province of the United States

=== Latin America ===
In Latin America, "Maristas" are also very active in the following countries: Chile, Puerto Rico, Guatemala, Peru, El Salvador, Mexico, Costa Rica, Nicaragua, Argentina, Brazil, Colombia, Uruguay, Paraguay, Venezuela and other countries as well. The largest number of brothers currently are natives from Spain and France. The Marist presence in these countries is divided into the following provinces:

- Province of Brasil Centro-Norte
- Province of Brasil Centro-Sul
- Province of Brasil Sul-Amazônia
- Province of Central America (Costa Rica, Cuba, El Salvador, Guatemala, Honduras, Puerto Rico, Nicaragua)
- Province of Cruz del Sur (Argentina, Paraguay and Uruguay)
- Province of Central Mexico
- Province of Western Mexico (parts of Mexico and Haiti)
- Province of the Northern Andes (Colombia, Ecuador and Venezuela)
- Province of Santa Maria of the Andes (Bolivia, Chile and Peru)

=== Africa ===
Marist brothers are active in a number of African countries, including Malawi, Zambia, Zimbabwe and Kenya. Marist brothers have been martyred in Africa on many occasions for educating and protecting refugee people. The administrative groupings of Marists in Africa are:

- Province of Southern Africa (Angola, Malawi, Mozambique, South Africa, Zambia and Zimbabwe)
- Province of East Central Africa (Central African Republic, Democratic Republic of Congo, Kenya, Rwanda and Tanzania)
- District of West Africa (Cameroon, Chad, Côte d'Ivoire, Ghana and Liberia)
- Province of Madagascar
- Province of Nigeria

== Cases of child abuse ==
=== Marist statement about abuse ===
Since the 2010s, several instances of sexual abuse within Marist-run institutions have been reported in Chile, Australia, and New Zealand.

In 2017, the Marist Brothers released a statement to survivors and victims of abuse. It was issued by the 22nd General Chapter and stated that "Abuse is the very antithesis of our Marist values, and undermines the very purpose of our Institute. Any abuse of children is a betrayal of the noble ideals of our founder, St Marcellin Champagnat".

Then the institution fought against adequate compensation measures for survivors of the abuse.

The Marist Brothers then offered less in compensation to Fijian survivors, than they had in New Zealand, leading to accusations of racism.

=== Australian royal commission ===
From June 2014, the Royal Commission into Institutional Responses to Child Sexual Abuse, initiated as a royal commission of inquiry by the Australian Government and supported by all of its state governments, began investigating the response of Marist Brothers to allegations of child sexual abuse in schools in the Australian Capital Territory, New South Wales and Queensland. A number of expert witnesses, former students, former teachers, former principals, former and current Marist officials and clergy, and one of the clergy at the centre of the allegations gave evidence or made statements before the commission.

In 2017, the commission published a report which documents significant evidence of child abuse at the hand of members of the Marist order and evidence that the response of the order systematically exacerbated the problems relating to abuse. Included in the report was a finding that "many alleged perpetrators remained in the same positions with access to children for years and sometimes decades after initial and successive allegations of child sexual abuse were raised". In many cases the Commission heard of "the minimisation of allegations of child sexual abuse". One of the key systematic issues that came to light was that it was typical for Brothers to move through many communities and ministries in their lifetime. In the 1960s and 1970s there were typically up to 100 transfers each year. As of 2017, compensation payments made totaled approximately $AUD2.7 million.

In March 2015, a former Marist Brother was arrested over a number of sex offences allegedly committed at St Joseph's College in Hunters Hill and St Gregory's College in Campbelltown in the 1980s.

In September 2016, during a royal commission hearing, the brother provincial of the Marist Brothers in Australia, Brother Peter Carroll, formally apologised to the family of Andrew Nash, whose suicide in 1974 at the age of 13 almost certainly resulted from sexual abuse by three of the order's predatory brothers – Dominic, Patrick and Romuald – and acknowledged that they had many more victims than the dozens who had come forward so far.

Other cases, documented in the report, included those related to Brother Chute who, in 2008, was convicted of 19 child sex offences against six of his former students during the period 1985 to 1989. 48 claims had been made of abuse that occurred from 1959 to 1990 at 6 different schools, while 40 students at Marist College Canberra laid complaints during the period 1976 to 1990. The Marist Brothers did not report any allegations of child sexual abuse to the police in the period 1962 to 1993.

Separately, in August 1996, Brother Gregory Sutton pleaded guilty to a total of 67 child sex offences in relation to 15 students at schools in New South Wales. Sutton had taught at six Marist schools between 1970 and 1986 and there were complaints about the abuse of 27 children made against him during this period. Sutton faced the courts again in Canberra in 2017, when he was given a suspended sentence after sexually assaulting two boys in Canberra in the 1980s.

In March 2025, Sutton received a further 15 months suspended sentence for sexually abusing a boy at a school in Innisfail, Queensland, between 1973 and 1975.

In September 2018, Australian Marist Brother Gerard McNamara, 80, was sentenced to nine months in prison for molesting five boys at St Paul's Catholic College, where he served as principal between 1970 and 1975. He had molested one of these boy 30 times. In May 2020, McNamara began serving a second stint in prison after pleading guilty to indecent assault of more than 15 male students between 1970 and 1975. This time, he received a sentence of 35 months in prison, with 28 months suspended. Since his first sex abuse conviction in June 2006, which resulted in a suspended prison sentence, McNamara received three additional convictions and sentences on sex abuse charges, but was able to once again receive a suspended prison sentence following another conviction in December 2016.

=== Cases of abuse in New Zealand ===
Marist Brother Claudius Pettit, real name Malcolm Thomas Petit, was convicted of child-sex abuse of a boy at a Wellington school in the 1990s. In 2005, John Louis Stevenson (known as Brother Bernard) and Brother Andrew Cody of the Hato Paora Māori Boys school in Feilding were convicted of sexual offenses and jailed. A Br. Aiden Benefield (Napier) was convicted of possessing child pornography in 2007.

Subsequently, in 2020, Kevin Healy (Brother Gordon) was convicted of four charges of indecency (from 1976 to 1977) between a man and boys aged 12 and 13, and one of indecency with a girl aged under 12.

Another was Ray Gannaway, known as Brother Ivan, who taught in Wellington and Auckland.

=== Cases of abuse in Europe ===
As of March 2016, 29 complaints had been made against six former teachers from three Marist schools in Barcelona, Catalonia, Spain, with three of these teachers confessing to sexual abuse. By February 2019, the number of complaints against Barcelona Marist school teachers had increased to 43, with 12 teachers named as suspected abusers. Two Barcelona Marist Brothers were criminally charged, with one being convicted. The trial for the second defendant commenced in March 2019, who declared in court that the institution knew about the abuses but took no action so he "felt protected by the Marists". He was sentenced to 21 years and 9 months in prison for sexually abusing four children, with the Marist Brothers paying 120,000 euros to each of his proven victims.

Similar cases were reported in Ireland, with a Marist Brother being the first member of a religious order convicted of child sexual abuse in Ireland. Several Marist Brothers were convicted of abuse at a number of schools and a judgement by the Supreme Court of Ireland found the order "vicariously liable" for abuses.

In Scotland, the Marist Brothers issued an apology in 2021 for the "systemic abuse of children" at several schools.

=== Cases of abuse in Chile ===
Abuse cases in Marist facilities in Chile included several involving diocesan priests Cristián Precht Bañados and Miguel Ortega of the Archdiocese of Santiago. Chilean police investigated the claims. Precht was suspended from ministry between 2012 and 2017 after being convicted by the Congregation for the Doctrine of the Faith. In 2012, Ortega was found guilty of sexually molesting boys and sentenced to 32 years in prison; he died in 2015. On 12 September 2018, Precht was charged and laicized. Precht had been incardinated in the Archdiocese of Santiago, and gained national recognition in the 1980s when he served as head of the Church's Vicariate of Solidarity human rights group that challenged ex-dictator Augusto Pinochet to end the practice of torture in Chile.

In 2017, the Chilean Marist Brothers revealed that at least 14 minors were abused by Marist Brother Abel Perez from the 1970s until 2000 at several schools in Chile. Perez confessed to his superiors in 2010, and was transferred to Peru.

== Marist saints and martyrs ==
On October 31, 1996, four brothers were killed by refugees and martyred in a mission in Nyamirangwe (Bugobe), Zaire. These brothers were all Spanish: Br. Fernando de la Fuente de la Fuente, Br. Miguel Ángel Isla Lucio, Br. Servando Mayor García, and Br. Julio Rodríguez Jorge.

On October 28, 2007, the Vatican beatified 498 saints who died as martyrs in the Spanish Civil War. Among the 498 were 47 Marist brothers from the dioceses of Burgos, Cartagena, Girona, Lleida, Palencia, Pamplona and Tudela, San Sebastián, Solsona, Terrassa, Teruel and Albarracin, Urgell and Vic. The Beatification Mass was presided over by Cardinal Jose Saraiva Martins.

On December 8, 2018, Br. Henri Vergès (1930–1994), from France, was among the nineteen beatified in Oran, Algeria, who were martyred in Algeria.

== Saints, Blesseds, and other holy people ==
Saints

- Marcellin-Joseph-Benoît Champagnat (20 May 1789 – 6 June 1840), founder of the order, canonized on 18 April 1999

Blesseds

- François-Benjamin (Lycarion) May (21 July 1870 – 27 July 1909), French professed religious martyred in Spain, to be beatified on 12 July 2025
- Laurentino Alonso Fuente and 46 Companions (died between October 1934 to October 1936), Martyrs of the Spanish Civil War, beatified on 28 October 2007
- Crisanto González García and 65 Companions (died between July 1936 to January 1939), Martyrs of the Spanish Civil War, beatified on 13 October 2013
- Henri Vergès (15 July 1930 – 8 May 1994), martyred in Algeria during the Algerian Civil War, beatified on 8 December 2018

Venerables

- Gabriel (François) Rivat (12 March 1808 – 2 January 1881), professed religious, declared Venerable on 4 July 1968
- Giuseppe Carlo (Alfano) Vaser (10 September 1873 – 1 March 1943), professed religious, declared Venerable on 22 January 1991

Servants of God

- Marie-Auguste Brun and 3 Companions (died between 17 June to 12 August 1900), Martyrs of China
- Eusebio Gómez Gutiérrez and 58 Companions (died between July 1936 to October 1938), Martyrs of the Spanish Civil War, declared Servants of God on 27 August 1993
- Moisés Cisneros Rodríguez (12 August 1945 – 24 April 1991), martyred in Guatemala
- Basilio Rueda Guzmán (14 October 1924 – 21 January 1996), professed religious, declared Servant of God on 4 June 2004

== Notable Marist Brothers ==
- Brother Anthony Boyd, former deputy headmaster of St Joseph's College, Hunters Hill
- Brother Ignatius O'Connor, founder of Marist College Ashgrove, Queensland
- Brother Leopold Smith, first headmaster of Marist College Eastwood
- Brother Walfrid, founder of the Celtic Football Club, Glasgow
- Brother Seán Sammon, former Superior General of the Marist Brothers
- Brother Charles Howard, former Superior General, and in 1997 he was declared a Member of the Order of Australia (AM) in recognition of his service to the Catholic Church and the community, particularly in the fields of education, social justice and reform. In 2000 he was awarded an honorary doctorate by the Australian Catholic University
- Brother Joche Albert Ly, a Chinese Marist Brother Martyr, killed for his opposition to Communism
- Brother Jean-Paul Desbiens, Canadian writer, journalist, and teacher
- Brother Stephen Smyth, General Secretary (2007–2014) of Action of Churches Together in Scotland (ACTS)
- Brother Octavius William Borrell, missionary school teacher, and botanist who studied the flora of Shanghai, China, and Kairiru Island in Wewak, East Sepik, Papua New Guinea. In 1998 the University of Melbourne conferred a Master of Science for his botanical work.
- Brother Claudius - principal and exploiter of children at St Bernard's Intermediate, Lower Hutt.
- Brother Julius, Petelo Ekeroma taught at St Bernard's Intermediate, Lower Hutt in the 1970s. Abused students.

== See also ==
- List of Marist Brothers schools
- Marist College Eastwood, Eastwood, New South Wales
- Red Bend Catholic College, Forbes, New South Wales
- St Joseph's College, Hunters Hill, New South Wales
