= Fuente-Olmedo =

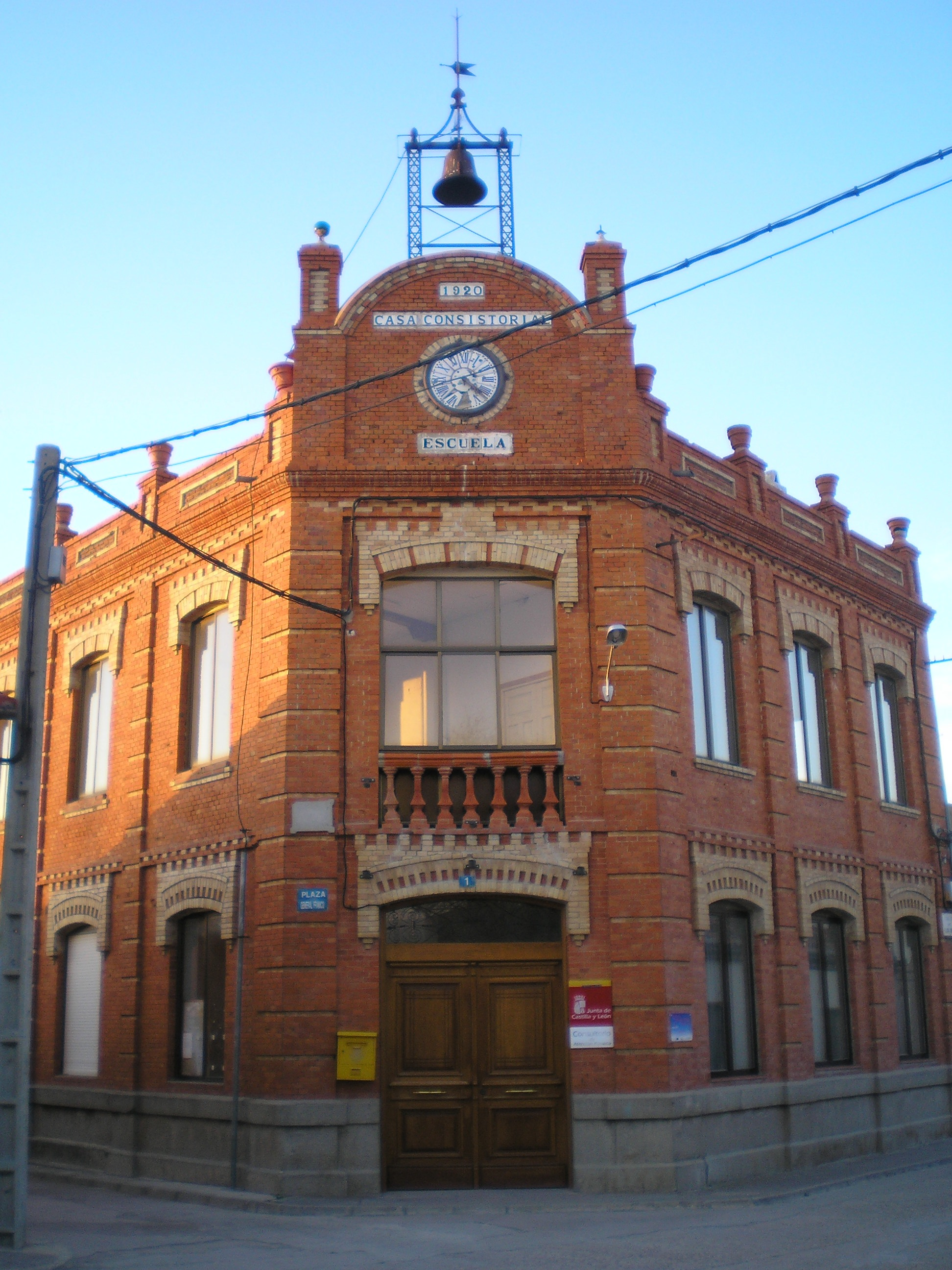

- Location in Spain.
- Coordinates: 41°14′38″N 4°38′50″W
- Country: Spain
- Autonomous community: Castile and León
- Province: Valladolid
- Comarca: Tierra de Pinares

Government
  - Mayor: Jesús María Fragua Gil

Area
  - Total: 13.56 km^{2} (5.24 sq mi)
- Elevation: 793 m (2,602 ft)

Population (2025-01-01)
  - Total: 42
  - Density: 3.1/km^{2} (8.0/sq mi)
- Demonym: Fuenteolmedanos
- Time zone: UTC+1 (CET)
  - Summer (DST): UTC+2 (CEST)
- Postal code: 47418

Fuente-Olmedo is a municipality located in the province of Valladolid, Castile and León, Spain. As of 2010 (INE), the municipality has a population of 45 inhabitants.
