= Fuente el Sol =

Coordinates: 41°11′N 4°56′W

Fuente el Sol, Spain
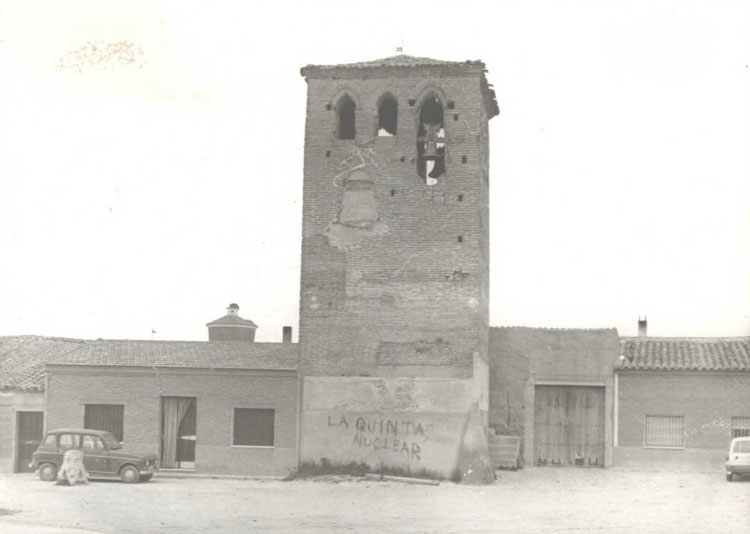
- Church

- Coat of arms
- Interactive map of Fuente el Sol, Spain
- Country: Spain
- Autonomous community: Castile and León
- Province: Valladolid
- Municipality: Fuente el Sol

Area
  - Total: 20 km^{2} (7.7 sq mi)

Population (2025-01-01)
  - Total: 150
  - Density: 7.5/km^{2} (19/sq mi)
- Time zone: UTC+1 (CET)
  - Summer (DST): UTC+2 (CEST)

Fuente el Sol is a municipality located in the province of Valladolid, Castile and León, Spain.

According to the 2004 census (INE), the municipality had a population of 278 inhabitants.

== See also ==
Fuente el Sol is also the name of a street and a park in the city of Valladolid.
