= Fuentes de Ropel =

Coordinates: 42°00′N 5°32′W

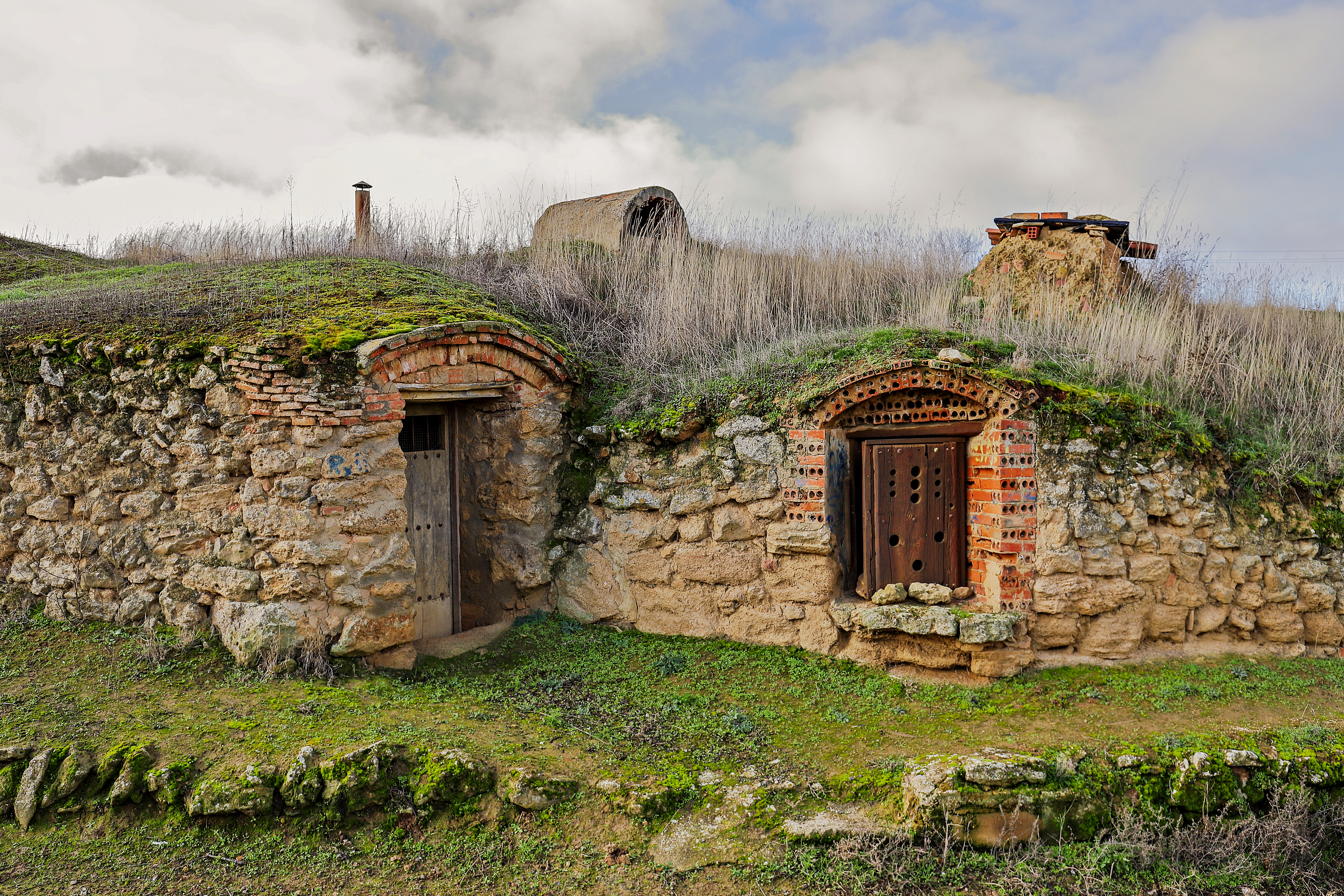

- Flag Coat of arms
- Interactive map of Fuentes de Ropel
- Country: Spain
- Autonomous community: Castile and León
- Province: Zamora
- Municipality: Fuentes de Ropel

Area
  - Total: 48 km^{2} (19 sq mi)

Population (2025-01-01)
  - Total: 369
  - Density: 7.7/km^{2} (20/sq mi)
- Time zone: UTC+1 (CET)
  - Summer (DST): UTC+2 (CEST)
- Website: www.aytofuentes.es

Fuentes de Ropel is a municipality located in the province of Zamora, Castile and León, Spain. According to the 2009 census (INE), the municipality has a population of 513 inhabitants.
