= Fuente Encalada =

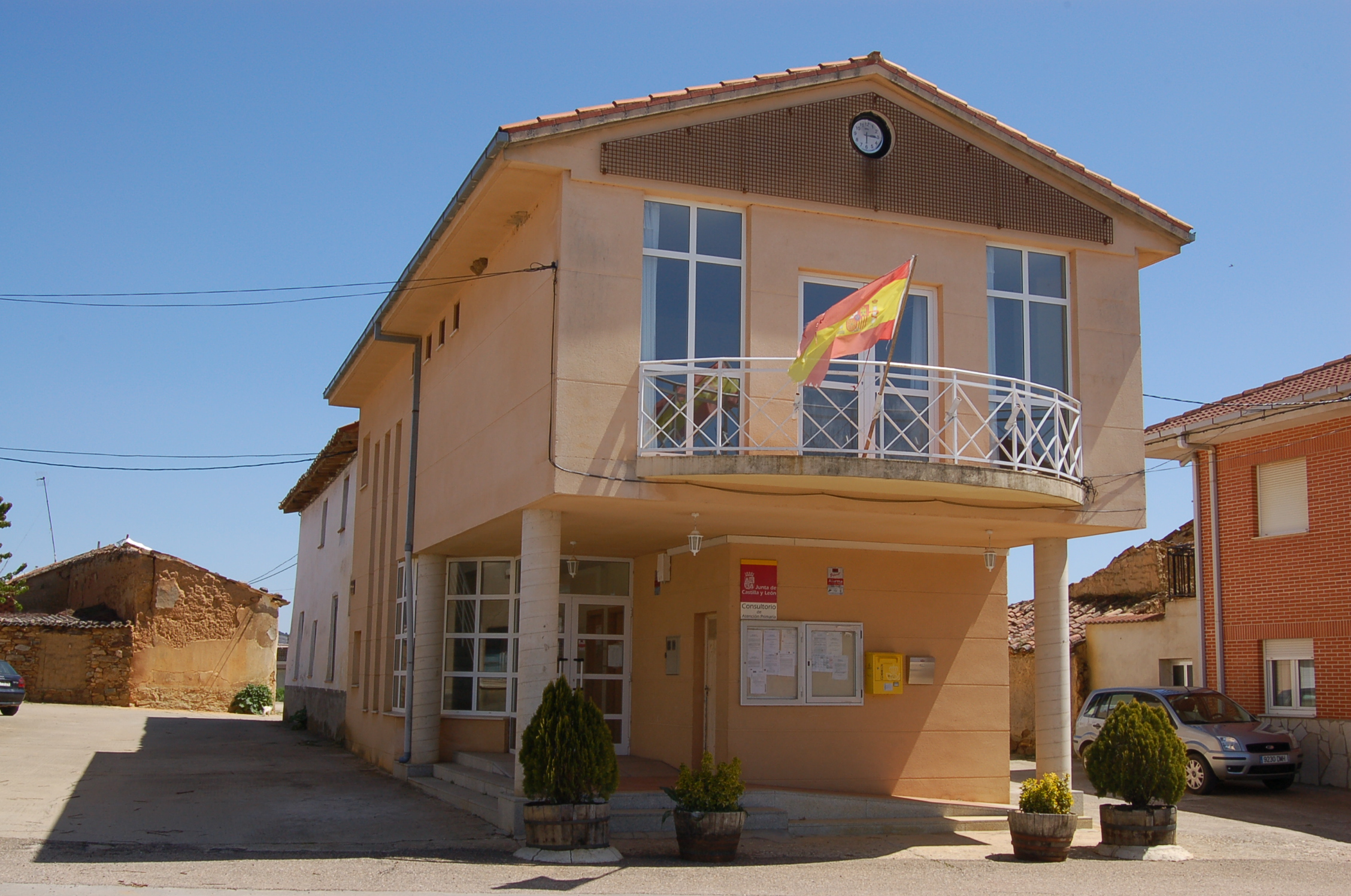

- Flag Coat of arms

- Location within Spain
- Coordinates: 42°06′38″N 5°59′36″W
- Country: Spain
- Autonomous community: Castile and León
- Province: Zamora
- Municipality: Fuente Encalada

Area
  - Total: 20.86 km^{2} (8.05 sq mi)
- Elevation: 752 m (2,467 ft)

Population (2025-01-01)
  - Total: 92
  - Density: 4.4/km^{2} (11/sq mi)
- Time zone: UTC+1 (CET)
  - Summer (DST): UTC+2 (CEST)
- Website: Official website

Fuente Encalada is a municipality located in the province of Zamora, Castile and León, Spain. At the 2009 census (INE) the municipality had a population of 125 inhabitants.
