= Fuente de Santa Cruz =

- Municipality
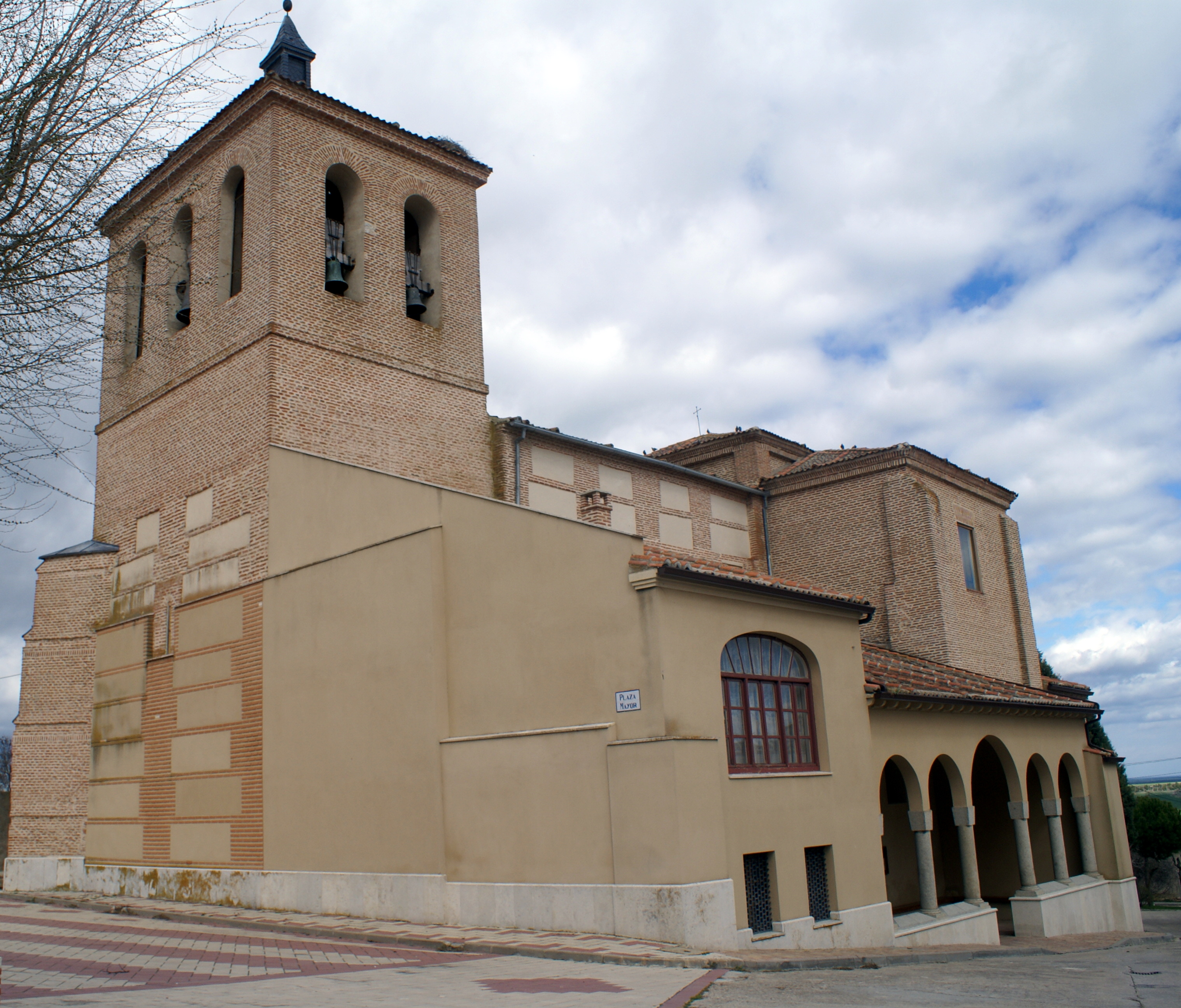
- Church of the Holly Cross

- Coat of arms

- Location in Spain. Fuente de Santa Cruz (Spain)
- Coordinates: 41°12′33″N 4°38′04″W
- Country: Spain
- Autonomous community: Castile and León
- Province: Segovia
- Municipality: Fuente de Santa Cruz

Area
  - Total: 17 km^{2} (6.6 sq mi)

Population (2025-01-01)
  - Total: 105
  - Density: 6.2/km^{2} (16/sq mi)
- Time zone: UTC+1 (CET)
  - Summer (DST): UTC+2 (CEST)
- Website: Official website

Fuente de Santa Cruz is a municipality located in the province of Segovia, Castile and León, Spain. According to the 2004 census (INE), the municipality has a population of 168 inhabitants.
