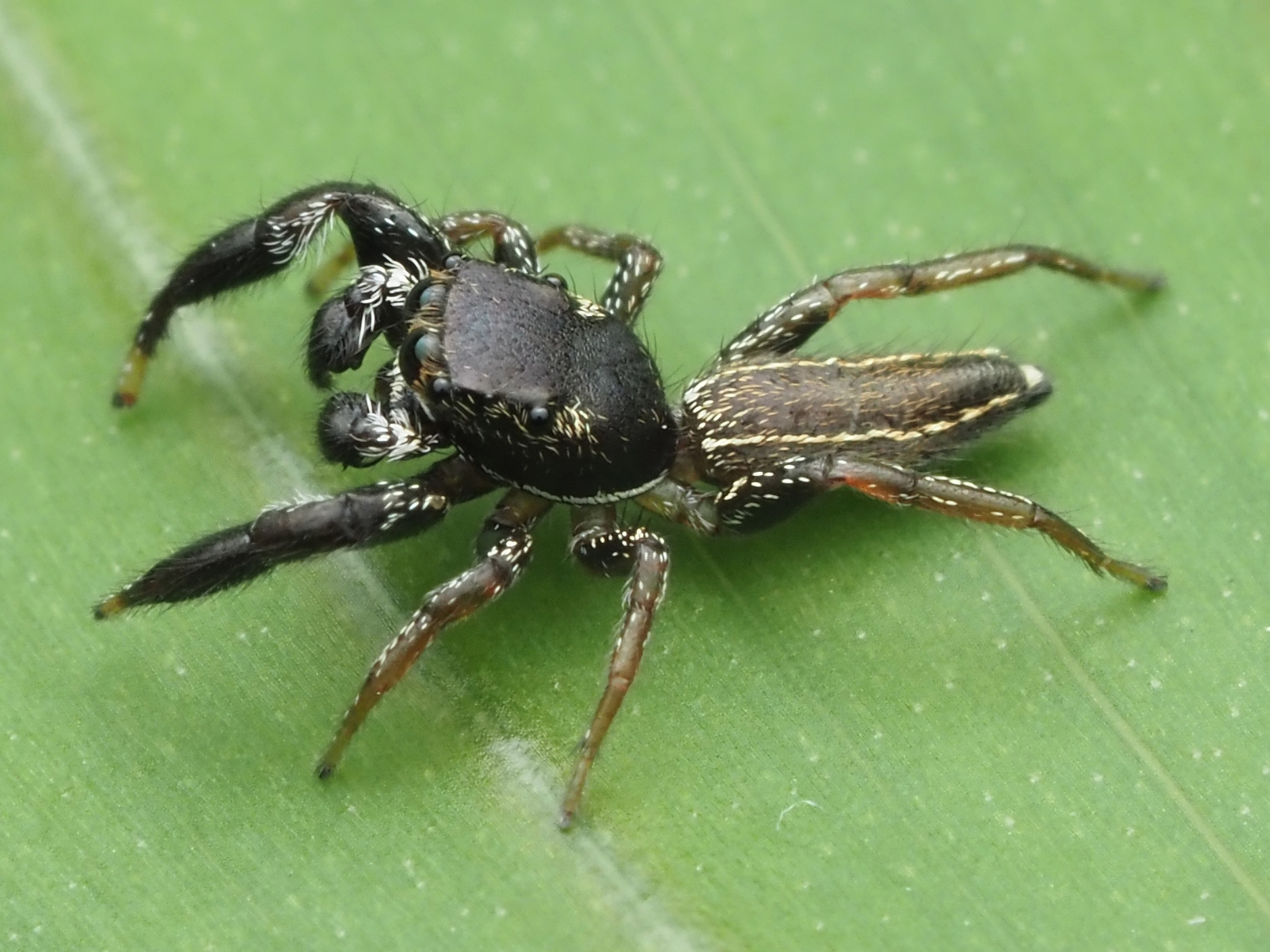
- Male Fuentes yucatan in Guatemala

Scientific classification
- Kingdom: Animalia
- Phylum: Arthropoda
- Subphylum: Chelicerata
- Class: Arachnida
- Order: Araneae
- Infraorder: Araneomorphae
- Family: Salticidae
- Subfamily: Salticinae
- Genus: Fuentes; Peckham & Peckham, 1894

Type species
- F. pertinax Peckham & Peckham, 1894

Species
- F. pertinax Peckham & Peckham, 1894 – Central America; F. yucatan Ruiz & Brescovit, 2007 – Mexico, Honduras

= Fuentes (spider) =

Genus of spiders

Fuentes is a genus of jumping spiders that was first described by George and Elizabeth Peckham in 1894. As of June 2019 it contains only two species, found only in Central America and Mexico: F. pertinax and F. yucatan.
