= Valhermoso de la Fuente =

Valhermoso de la Fuente, Spain
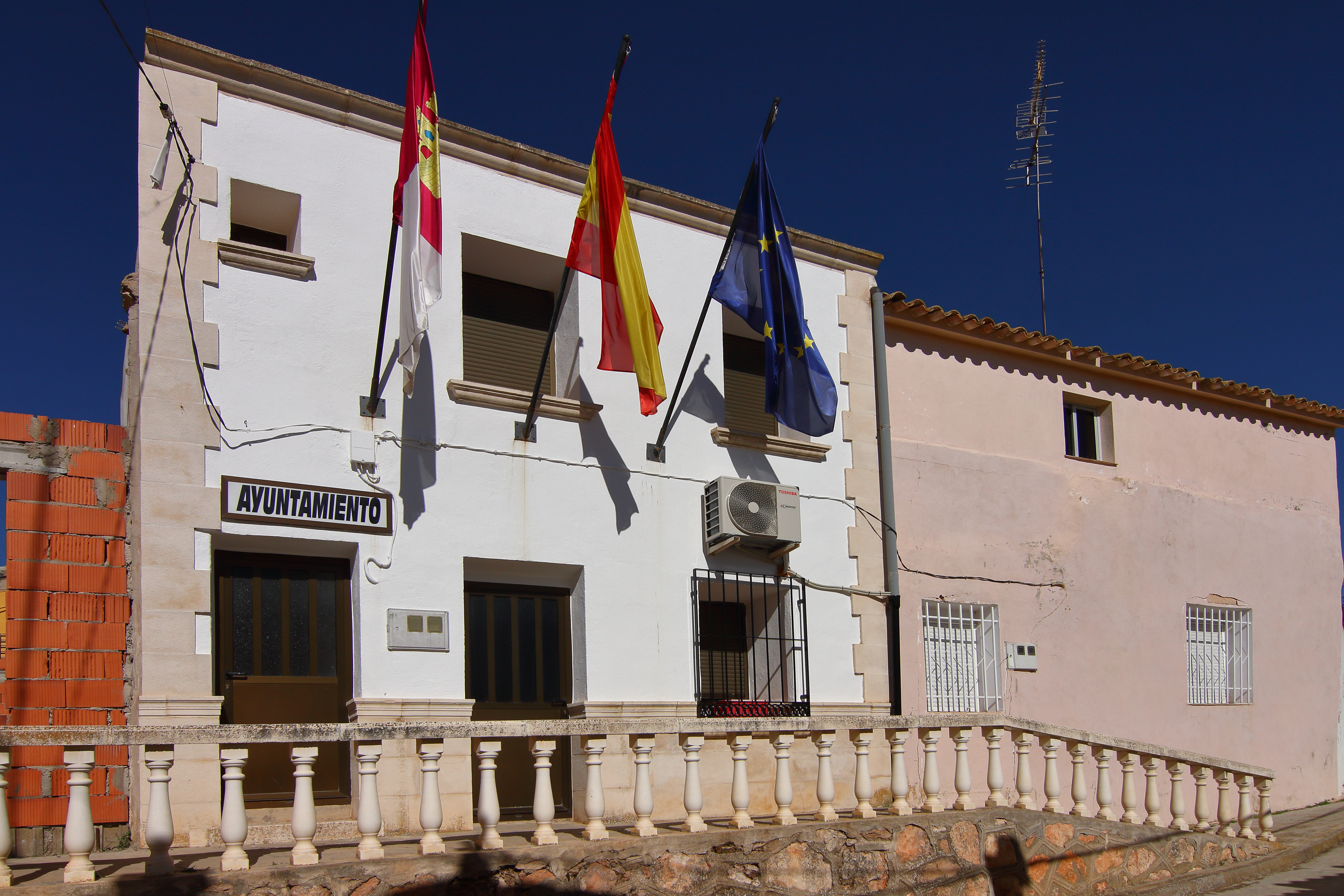
- Town hall

- Location within Spain Location within Castilla-La Mancha
- Country: Spain
- Autonomous community: Castile-La Mancha
- Province: Cuenca
- Municipality: Valhermoso de la Fuente

Area
  - Total: 32 km^{2} (12 sq mi)

Population (2025-01-01)
  - Total: 61
  - Density: 1.9/km^{2} (4.9/sq mi)
- Time zone: UTC+1 (CET)
  - Summer (DST): UTC+2 (CEST)

Valhermoso de la Fuente is a municipality located in the Province of Cuenca, Castile-La Mancha, Spain. According to the 2004 census by the National Statistics Institute, the municipality has a population of 46 inhabitants.
