= Charles Howard (Marist Brother) =

Australian Marist Brother

Charles Howard FMS AM (29 October 1924 – 14 January 2012) was an Australian Marist Brother who held the office of worldwide superior general of the order from 1985 to 1993. His religious name during much of his Marist career was "Brother Elias". He was the first Australian to be elected to lead the Marist Brothers' worldwide organisation.

== Life and career ==
=== Early life and teaching career ===
Howard was born in Melbourne on 29 October 1924. His family relocated to Sydney during his youth and he attended the Marist Brothers school in Randwick, Sydney. In 1942 he pronounced his first vows and received the religious habit.

He was on staff at St Joseph's College, Hunters Hill, from 1955 to 1956 and at the Marist juniorate in Mittagong. He was headmaster at St Joseph's College from 1962 to 1967 and was also headmaster at St Gregory's College, Campbelltown.

=== Religious formation and leadership ===
Howard had studied for a period with the order in France in 1961 and in Rome in 1968 participating at the general chapter as a delegate. In 1968 he pursued studies in catechetics at Leuven, Belgium. Subsequently, he went to Dublin, Ireland, for further studies in psychology.

In 1972, Howard was appointed provincial of the Sydney province and served in that role and as provincial superior of the Marists in eastern Australia until 1976, when he was elected to the general council of the Marist Brothers in Rome. In 1985, he was the first Australian to be elected superior general of the Marist Brothers, and served as superior general until 1993. Major undertakings during his mandate included the creation of the International Finance Commission, the new Marist presence in Eastern Europe and the establishment of international scholasticates for Africa and for Asia. After his generalate was over, he spent years in novitiates at Kutama (Africa) and Lomeri (Pacific). For a period he was the delegate visitor for the Sector of India.

In 1997, he was declared a Member of the Order of Australia (AM) in recognition of his service to the Catholic Church and the community, particularly in the fields of education, social justice and reform. In 2000 he was awarded an honorary doctorate by the Australian Catholic University.

== See also ==
- Seán Sammon
