= Cerbón =

- Municipality
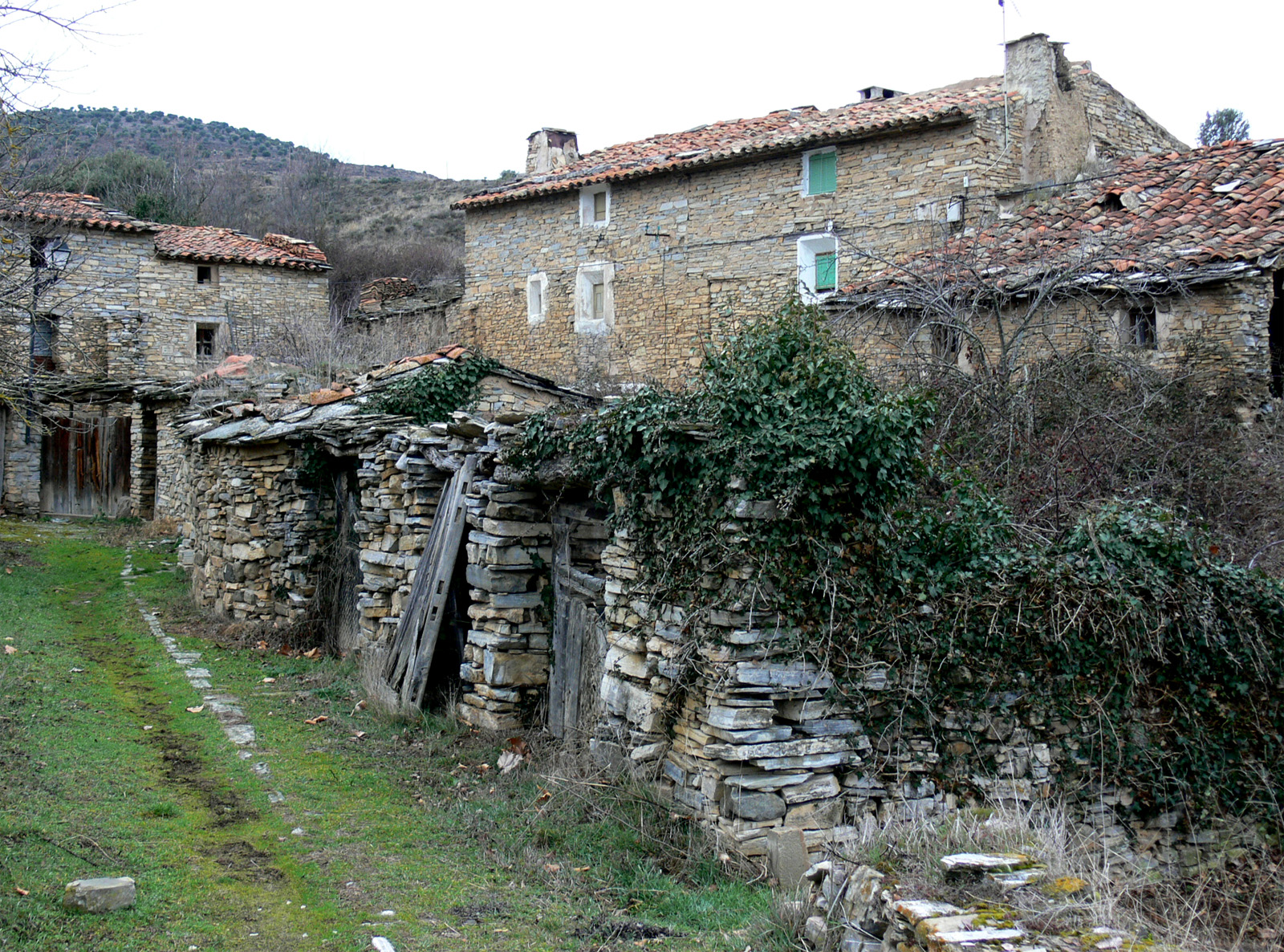

- Location in Spain. Cerbón (Spain)
- Country: Spain
- Autonomous community: Castile and León
- Province: Soria
- Municipality: Cerbón

Area
  - Total: 18.02 km^{2} (6.96 sq mi)

Population (2025-01-01)
  - Total: 27
  - Density: 1.5/km^{2} (3.9/sq mi)
- Time zone: UTC+1 (CET)
  - Summer (DST): UTC+2 (CEST)
- Website: Official website

Cerbón is a municipality located in the province of Soria, Castile and León, Spain. According to the 2004 census (INE), the municipality has a population of 34 inhabitants.
