= Fernando de la Fuente de la Fuente =

Fernando de la Fuente de la Fuente (16 December 1943 – 31 October 1996) was a Spanish Marist Brother and missionary who was one of four Marist Brothers martyred at the Nyamirangwe refugee camp, Zaire. Together with the brothers of his community who were assassinated, Miguel Ángel Isla Lucio, Servando Mayor García, and Julio Rodríguez Jorge. Fuente is commemorated in Marist circles as one of The Martyrs of Bugobe.

== Early life and works ==
Born to Sigismundo and Primitiva de la Fuente de la Fuente in Burgos, Spain, he became a teacher in Chile after taking his first vows on 2 July 1962. He had also worked as a formator and a member of the Chilean Provincial council.

== Life in Zaire ==
The Marist Brothers had had a strong presence in east-central Africa, particularly Rwanda, where they had been 1952. However, with the Rwandan genocide in 1994, in August 1994, the General Assembly and the District Council of the Brothers of Rwanda took the decision to have a renewed presence among the Rwandans to assist in the nation's rebuilding. Within the country, three communities which centred their mission on the schools were reopened. Six Brothers formed a new community at the service of the refugees outside the country. In view of the escalating difficulties faced by the refugees and the Rwandan Brothers themselves, the community was reinforced with three non-African Brothers. But as the inter-racial tensions persisted, it was decided to withdraw the Rwandan Brothers from the Bugobe community.

To aid the mission of the Rwandan Brothers, Fuente offered to participate as an expression of missionary solidarity. He was accepted and left in December 1995 to serve the mission. After two months in Belgium, at the Centre for the Formation of French-speaking Missionaries, he went to Zaire, to the refugee camp of Nyamirangwe (Bugobe), in February 1996.

== Assassination ==
The brothers were assassinated on 31 October 1996 around eight o'clock in the evening. They were apparently shot. The perpetrators of the crime were a group of the Officers of the Rwandan Patriotic Army (APR), who murdered the Archbishop Christophe Munzihirwa two days before and the Rwandan and Burundian refugees in the refugee camp Nyamirangwe. The four bodies were recovered from the waste-water tank on 14 November and have been interred at the brothers' novitiate house in Nyangezi.
