= Fuente el Olmo de Íscar =

- Municipality
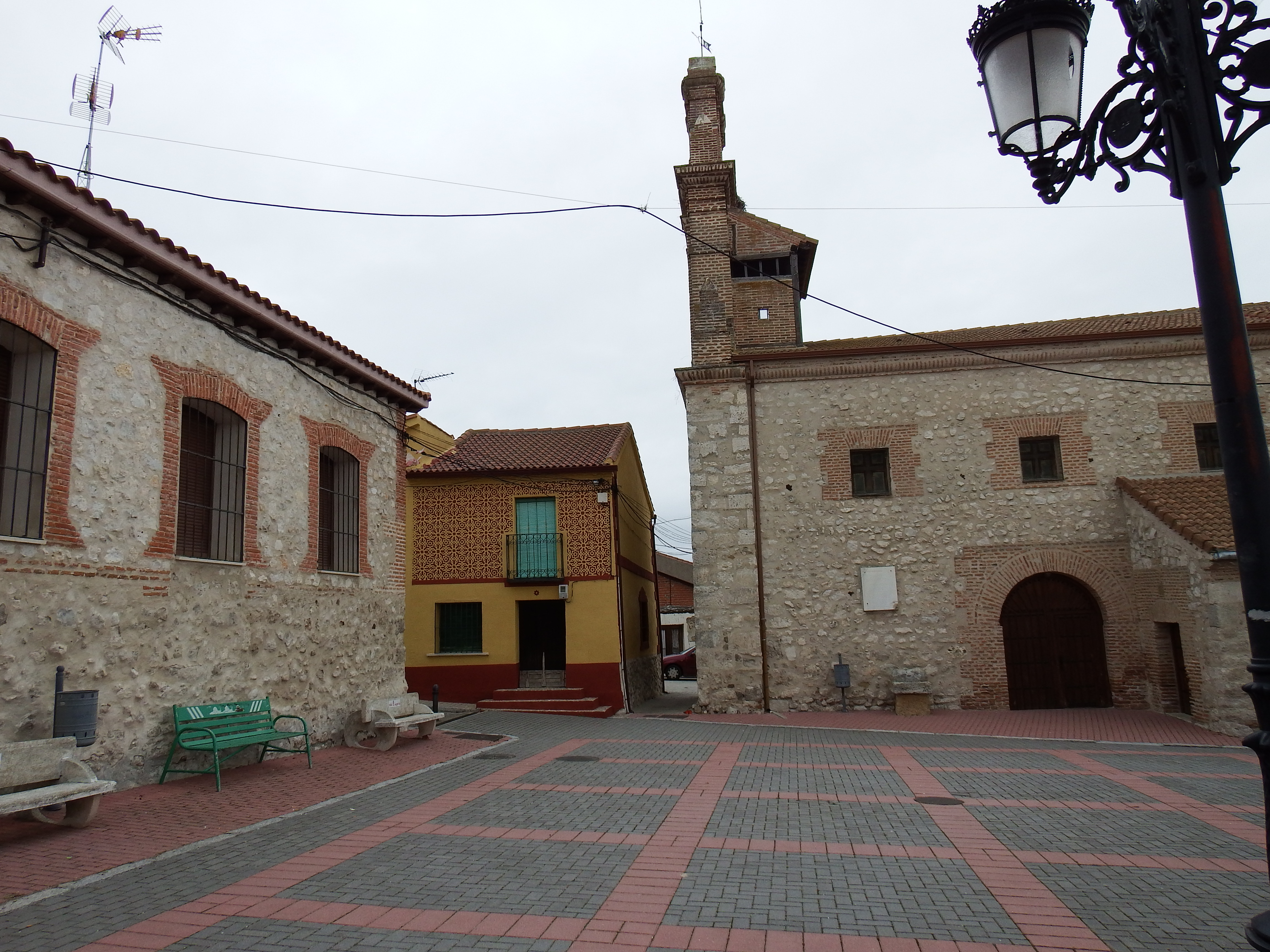
- Fuente el Olmo de Íscar Main Square

- Location in Spain. Fuente el Olmo de Íscar (Spain)
- Coordinates: 41°16′49″N 4°29′40″W
- Country: Spain
- Autonomous community: Castile and León
- Province: Segovia
- Municipality: Fuente el Olmo de Íscar

Area
  - Total: 7 km^{2} (2.7 sq mi)

Population (2025-01-01)
  - Total: 51
  - Density: 7.3/km^{2} (19/sq mi)
- Time zone: UTC+1 (CET)
  - Summer (DST): UTC+2 (CEST)
- Website: Official website

Fuente el Olmo de Íscar is a municipality located in the province of Segovia, Castile and León, Spain. According to the 2004 census (INE), the municipality has a population of 95 inhabitants.
