= Fuentes de Magaña =

- Municipality
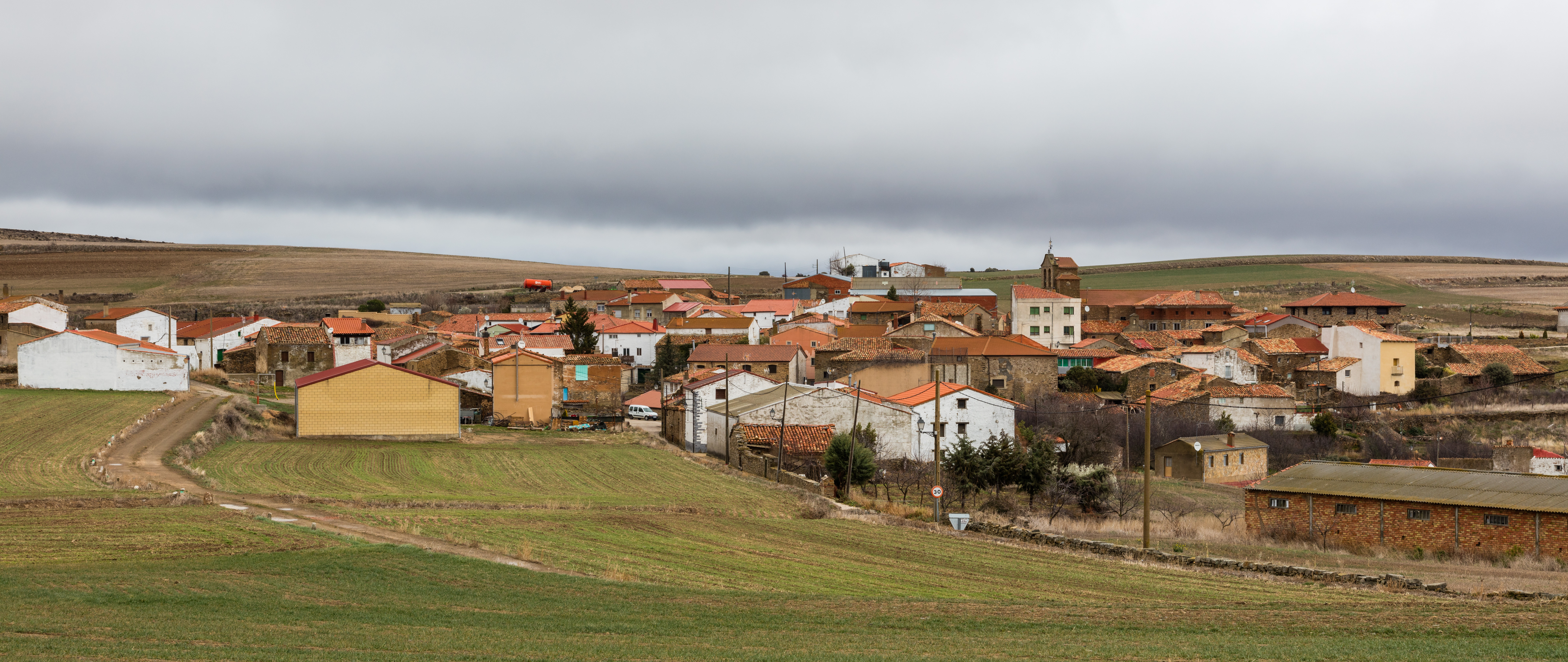
- View of Fuentes de Magaña, Soria, Spain

- Location in Spain. Fuentes de Magaña (Spain)
- Coordinates: 41°56′06″N 2°10′48″W
- Country: Spain
- Autonomous community: Castile and León
- Province: Soria
- Municipality: Fuentes de Magaña

Area
  - Total: 11 km^{2} (4.2 sq mi)
- Elevation: 1,142 m (3,747 ft)

Population (2025-01-01)
  - Total: 47
  - Density: 4.3/km^{2} (11/sq mi)
- Time zone: UTC+1 (CET)
  - Summer (DST): UTC+2 (CEST)
- Website: Official website

Fuentes de Magaña is a municipality located in the province of Soria, Castile and León, Spain. According to the 2004 census (INE), the municipality has a population of 84 inhabitants.
