= Marist College (disambiguation) =

Marist University is a university in Poughkeepsie, New York, U.S.

Marist College may also refer to:

In Australia:

- Marist College Ashgrove, Queensland
- Marist College Canberra, Pearce, Australian Capital Territory
- Marist College Eastwood, New South Wales
- Marist College Kogarah, New South Wales
- Marist College Penshurst, Mortdale, New South Wales
- Marist Catholic College North Shore, North Sydney, New South Wales
- Marist College Rosalie, Paddington, Queensland
- Marist Regional College, Burnie, Tasmania

In Ireland:

- Marist College, Athlone

In New Zealand:

- Marist College, Auckland

== See also ==
- List of Marist Brothers schools
- Marist School (disambiguation)
