= Marist School =

A Marist school is a school operated by the Marist Brothers of the Schools.

Marist School may also refer to:

In Australia:

- Marist Catholic College Penshurst, Sydney
- Marist College Ashgrove, Brisbane
- Marist College Eastwood, Sydney
- Marist College Kogarah, St George, Sydney
- Marist Catholic College North Shore, North Sydney
- Parramatta Marist High School, Westmead, Sydney
- St Patrick's Marist College, Dundas, Sydney

In Japan:

- Marist Brothers International School, Kobe, Japan

In the Philippines:

- Marist School (Marikina)

In the United Kingdom:

- The Marist School, Sunninghill, Berkshire, England

In the United States:

- Marist Catholic High School in Eugene, Oregon
- Marist High School (Chicago)
- Marist High School (Bayonne, New Jersey)
- Marist School (Brookhaven, Georgia)

== See also ==
- Marist College (disambiguation)
- List of Marist Brothers schools
