= Philip Esler =

Theologian

Philip Francis Esler FRSE
- Born: August 27, 1952 (age 74); Sydney, Australia
- Occupation: Portland Chair in New Testament Studies at the University of Gloucestershire
- Known for: Social-scientific interpretation of biblical texts

Academic background
- Education: Marist Brothers High School
- Alma mater: Magdalen College, Oxford
- Thesis: Community and Gospel in Luke-Acts: The Social and Political Motivations of Lucan Theology (1984)

Academic work
- Institutions: St Andrews University, St Mary’s University College Twickenham, University of Gloucestershire

Philip Francis Esler FRSE (born 27 August 1952) is the Portland Chair in New Testament Studies at the University of Gloucestershire. He is an Australian-born higher education administrator and academic who became the inaugural chief executive of the UK's Arts and Humanities Research Council (AHRC) in 2005, remaining in that role until 2009. From 1995 to 2010 he was professor of Biblical criticism at University of St Andrews. From 1998 to 2001 he was vice-principal for research and provost of St Leonard’s College at St Andrews. During the years 1999 to 2003 he served as a member of the board of Scottish Enterprise Fife. From October 2010 to March 2013 he was principal at St Mary’s University College Twickenham. He had an earlier career as a lawyer, working in Sydney during 1978-81 and 1984-92 as an articled clerk, then solicitor and barrister.

Esler is a leading figure with an international reputation in the field of social-scientific interpretation of biblical texts. He applies ideas and perspectives from disciplines such as social psychology, anthropology and sociology to Old and New Testament texts to gain a better sense of what they meant to their original audiences. He has also published in the areas of New Testament theology and the Bible and the visual arts. He holds a Doctor of Divinity from the University of Oxford, by submitted work (2008), and is a Fellow of the Royal Society of Edinburgh (elected 2009).

== Life, career and scholarship ==
=== Early Life and Education (1952-1984) ===
Born in Sydney, Australia on 27 August 1952, Esler completed secondary schooling at the then named Marist Brothers High School in the Sydney suburb of Eastwood. He read English, Greek and Law at the University of Sydney (B.A. Hons, LL.B) from 1971 to 1977. During 1977 he also worked as Associate to Mr Justice W. H. Collins of the New South Wales Supreme Court. From 1978 to 1981 he was employed as an articled clerk and solicitor at Allen, Allen and Hemsley, at the same time completing undergraduate Hebrew at Sydney University on a non-degree basis (1978-1980) and undertaking part of an LLM. In 1979 he and four others established National Outlook, an Australian Christian ecumenical monthly magazine devoted to justice and peace issues. In October 1981, Esler went to Magdalen College, Oxford and undertook a D. Phil in New Testament.

At that time the new movement to apply social-scientific ideas and perspectives in biblical interpretation was gaining momentum. Esler adopted this broad approach in his doctorate and applied ideas from the sociology of knowledge and of sectarianism to investigate how social and political factors had affected the way Luke wrote his Gospel and the Acts of the Apostles. Thus, Peter Berger and Thomas Luckmann’s The Social Construction of Reality supplied the idea that Luke was legitimating a new social and religious movement to its members in the late first century AD. Esler’s doctoral thesis was accepted by Oxford in 1984 and a modified version was published by Cambridge University Press in 1987.

=== Law career (1984-1992) ===
In 1984 Esler returned to Sydney, initially as a solicitor at Allen, Allen and Hemsley before being called to the Bar in 1986. He completed his LLM in these years. In 1985 he began teaching New Testament courses on a part-time basis at Sydney University. In 1990 Esler attended a meeting in Portland, Oregon of a group of mainly US biblical critics committed to social-scientific interpretation. At this meeting those present formally constituted themselves as "The Context Group: A Project for the Study of the Bible in its Socio-Cultural Context". Although of diverse interests, all members accepted the importance of Mediterranean anthropology in understanding the context of ancient Greco-Roman world. Esler remains a member of the Context Group and has written on its history and modus operandi.

=== Career and Scholarship at St Andrews (1992-2010) ===
In 1992 Esler was appointed Reader in New Testament in the University of St Andrews, becoming Professor of Biblical Criticism there in 1995. At St Andrews, Esler initially published research which drew on his initial focus on the sociology of knowledge and of sectarianism and his expanding interests in Mediterranean anthropology, millennialism and magic. In the mid-1990s Esler began using both the social identity theory of social psychologist Henri Tajfel and the approach to ethnic identity of anthropologist Fredrik Barth and these have been prominent in his research since then. In 1996 he published an essay applying social identity theory and Barth’s ideas on ethnicity to Galatians. This was the first published application of social identity theory in New Testament studies. Social identity theory has now become a widely used approach in New Testament interpretation.

Esler applied both social identity theory and ideas on ethnicity in Galatians (1998) and Conflict and Identity in Romans (2003). He has recently argued for the need to take seriously the reality of Judean ethnic identity in the ancient Mediterranean world and its asymmetrical relationship to Christ-movement socio-religious identity in the interpretation of New Testament texts.

Esler also writes on the way that biblical stories have been represented in Western art, including his study of two Rembrandt depictions of Saul and David in 1998. In 2004 he co-authored with artist Jane Boyd a book on the Velázquez painting Christ with Martha and Mary in the National Gallery in London which was covered in The Independent on 18 February 2005 under the heading "Through the looking-glass: how a mirror explains the secrets of a masterpiece" (p. 3). A work Esler co-authored with Ronald A. Piper, Lazarus, Martha and Mary: A Social-Scientific and Theological Reading of John, contains a chapter on the Lazarus frescoes from the early Christian tombs in the Roman catacombs. More recently Esler has contributed a chapter on the biblical paintings of Welsh artist Ivor Williams to Imaging the Bible in Wales 1800-1975 (edited by Martin O’Kane and John Morgan-Guy).

=== Roles with Research Funding Agencies (2005-2009) ===
Esler’s understanding of the role of the Arts and Humanities Research Council on his appointment as its chief executive in 2005 appeared in an article in The Guardian. His developing views were reflected in the evidence he provided to the House of Commons Select Committee on Science and Technology at their introductory meeting with him on 28 February 2007 While at the AHRC, Esler also chaired the Network Board of HERA: Humanities in the European Research Area, an EU-funded network of national Research Funding Agencies for collaborative research in the humanities. For much of his last year at the AHRC, Esler was involved in a major project on impact published in 2009 as Leading the World: The Economic Impact of UK Arts and Humanities Research. One of his initiatives in this project was commissioning essays by leading UK arts and humanities researchers on the public value of research in their areas. These were later edited by Jonathan Bate FBA and published in 2010 as The Public Value of the Humanities.

While chief executive of the Arts and Humanities Research Council (2005-2009), Esler chaired the Research Councils UK Knowledge Transfer and Impact project that formulated an approach to impact that was then applied to Research Council grants. Impact was also later adopted, after some development, by the Higher Education Funding Council for England. Esler also brokered a collaborative agreement between all seven UK Research Councils and the Research Funding Agency of the State of São Paulo in Brazil ("FAPESP"). This agreement was signed by him on behalf of the Research Councils and by the president of FAPESP on 15 September 2009. This agreement was renewed for a further three years in September 2012

=== St Mary's University College (2010-2013) ===
On 1 October 2010 Esler became principal and professor of Biblical interpretation at St Mary's University College, Twickenham.

Around this time, Esler returned to the application of Mediterranean anthropology to biblical texts in Sex, Wives, and Warriors: Reading Biblical Narrative With Its Ancient Audience (2011). Esler has formulated an approach called ‘archival ethnography’ to assist in the interpretation of the legal papyri from 70 to 200 CE that survive from caves in the Dead Sea region. From 2009 to 2015 Esler was one of fifteen members of the Council of the Society of Biblical Literature (SBL), one of the oldest learned societies in the US, with members from the US and other countries.

In 2012, St Mary’s was the subject of a QAA report into a degree programme in Clinical Hypnosis provided with a partner institution, a programme that Esler and the Senior Management later closed. In the same year a number of other issues related to the University College were widely reported in the press: opposition to the decision to merge two academic schools; the unpopularity of the suspension of the head of one of those schools; protests against the merger and senior management by some theological and other students at the University College and at the Catholic Bishops Conference of England and Wales; the legal proceedings preparatory to commencement of a defamation suit brought by Esler and two other members of staff against the editor of a Catholic news site, proceedings from which Esler later withdrew; a vote of no confidence in Esler by the local branch of the Universities and Colleges Union (UCU).

On 22 January 2013, Esler announced that he would step down as Principal of St Mary's on 31 March 2013.

=== University of Gloucestershire and Current Scholarship (2013-Present) ===
On 1 September 2013, Esler was appointed Portland Chair in New Testament Studies at the University of Gloucestershire in Cheltenham, England. Since then, he has continued scholarship in biblical interpretation, publishing and editing books and other works summarized below:

- Babatha's Orchard: The Yadin Papyri and An Ancient Jewish Family Tale Retold, was published by Oxford University Press, Oxford on 23 February 2017. Esler has written articles related to this book for OUP and for Bible and Interpretation. The book has been reviewed. It has also attracted attention in the Jewish and regional press.
- In June 2017 The Blessing of Enoch: 1 Enoch and Contemporary Theology, which Esler edited, was published by Cascade Books in Eugene, Oregon. This book inaugurates a new area of theological research.
- In July 2017 Routledge published Esler’s second, enlarged edition of The Early Christian World.
- Esler's monograph, God's Court and Courtiers in the Book of the Watchers: Re-interpreting Heaven in 1 Enoch 1-36, was published in November 2017, with endorsements by John Collins and Loren Stuckenbruck.
- In 2018, Esler applied the anthropology and sociology of gossip to the Book of Ruth in an article in the Journal of Biblical Literature, an article that attracted a positive comment in a statement from the outgoing editor of the journal.
- In mid-2019 Esler published Ethiopian Christianity: History, Theology, Practice with Baylor University Press.
- In 2021, the monograph 2 Corinthians: A Social Identity Commentary (420 pages) was published by Bloomsbury T & T Clark.

Since 2015 Esler and his colleague Angus Pryor, practising artist and head of the School of Arts at the University of Gloucestershire, have been engaged in a research collaboration on the ancient Jewish text 1 Enoch (that survived from antiquity only in Ethiopia). This collaboration led to Pryor creating twelve 2m x 2m paintings on 1 Enoch and a large-scale, illuminated model of an Ethiopian church. These works have been exhibited online, with supporting iconographic documentation co-authored by Esler and Pryor, under the title Enoch: Heaven’s Messenger, since July 2020.

== Works ==
=== Books ===
- Esler, Philip Francis (1987). Community and Gospel in Luke-Acts: The Social and Political Motivations of Lucan Theology. Cambridge, UK: Cambridge University Press. ISBN 9780511554933. OCLC 967401479.
- ——— (1994). The First Christians in Their Social Worlds: Social-Scientific Approaches to New Testament Interpretation. London: Routledge. ISBN 9780415111225. OCLC 472779746.
- ——— (1998). Galatians. London: Routledge. ISBN 9780203319796. OCLC 52080852.
- ——— (2003). Conflict and Identity in Romans: The Social Setting of Paul's Letter. Minneapolis, MN: Fortress Press. ISBN 9780800634353. OCLC 53896055.
- ———; Boyd, Jane (2004). Visuality and Biblical Text: Interpreting Velázquez Christ with Martha and Mary as a Test Case. Arte e archeologia. Vol. 26. Firenze: Leo S. Olschki. ISBN 9788822253699. OCLC 803419566.
- ——— (2005). New Testament Theology: Communion and Community. Minneapolis, MN: Fortress Press. ISBN 9780800637194. OCLC 58536677.
- ———; Piper, Ronald A. (2006). Lazarus, Martha and Mary: A Social-Scientific and Theological Reading of John. Minneapolis, MN: Augsburg Press. ISBN 9780800638306. OCLC 68624004.
- ——— (2011). Sex, Wives, and Warriors: Reading Biblical Narrative with Its Ancient Audience. Cambridge, UK: James Clarke & Co. ISBN 9780227901281. OCLC 44251604.
- ——— (2017). Babatha's Orchard: The Yadin Papyri and An Ancient Jewish Family Tale Retold. Oxford, UK: Oxford University Press. ISBN 9780198767169. OCLC 994287444.
- ——— (2017). God's Court and Courtiers in the Book of the Watchers: Re-interpreting Heaven in 1 Enoch 1-36. Eugene, OR: Cascade Books. ISBN 9781625649089. OCLC 1007062905.
- ——— (2019). Ethiopian Christianity: History, Theology, Practice. Waco, TX: Baylor University Press. ISBN 9781481306744.
- ——— (2021). 2 Corinthians: A Social Identity Commentary. London: T & T Clark. ISBN 9780567668721.

=== As editor ===
- ———, ed. (1995). Modelling Early Christianity: Social-Scientific Studies of the New Testament in its Context. London: Routledge. ISBN 9780415129817. OCLC 31900112.
- ———, ed. (1998). Christianity for the Twenty First Century. Edinburgh: T&T Clark. ISBN 9780567086013. OCLC 39533733.
- ———, ed. (2000). The Early Christian World: Volume I. London: Routledge. ISBN 9780203470626. OCLC 51914862.
- ———, ed. (2000). The Early Christian World: Volume II. London: Routledge. ISBN 9780415241410. OCLC 42786254.
- ———, ed. (2005). Ancient Israel: The Old Testament in Its Social Context. Minneapolis, MN: Fortress Press. ISBN 9780800637675. OCLC 60596115.
- ———, ed. (2017). The Blessing of Enoch: 1 Enoch and Contemporary Theology. Eugene, OR: Wipf and Stock Publishers. ISBN 9781532614255. OCLC 994746214.
- ———, ed. (2017). The Early Christian World (in one volume) (Revised 2nd ed.). London: Routledge. ISBN 9781351678292.

=== Chapters and Articles ===
- ——— (1998). "Poverty and riches in the Bible and the third world". In Esler, Philip Francis (ed.). Christianity for the Twenty First Century. Edinburgh: T&T Clark. pp. 145–180. ISBN 9780567086013. OCLC 39533733.
- ——— (2003). "Ezra-Nehemiah as a Narrative of (Re-Invented) Israelite Identity". Biblical Interpretation. 11 (3): 413–426. doi:10.1163/156851503322566822.
- ——— (2004). "The Sodom Tradition in Romans 1:18–32". Biblical Theology Bulletin: Journal of Bible and Culture. 34 (1): 4–16. doi:10.1177/014610790403400102. S2CID 143164205.
- ——— (2006). "Paul's Contestation of Israel's (Ethnic) Memory of Abraham in Galatians 3". Biblical Theology Bulletin: Journal of Bible and Culture. 36 (1): 23–34. doi:10.1177/01461079060360010302 (inactive 11 September 2025).
- ———. "Prototypes, antitypes and social identity in First Clement: outlining a new interpretative model". Annali di Storia dell'esegesi. 24 (1): 125–146.
- ———. "Reading Matthew by the Dead Sea: Matthew 8:5-13 in Light of P. Yadin 11". Hervormde Teologiese Studies. 70 (1): 1–12.
- ——— (2015). "Intergroup Conflict and Matthew 23: Towards Responsible Historical Interpretation of a Challenging Text" (PDF). Biblical Theology Bulletin: Journal of Bible and Culture. 45 (1): 38–59. doi:10.1177/0146107914564824. S2CID 143770001.
- ——— (8 April 2015). "The World of Jesus and the Early Church: Identity and Interpretation in Early Communities of Faith". Journal of Theological Studies. 66 (1): 359–362. doi:10.1093/jts/flu164.
- ———; Mason, Steve (2017). "Judaean and Christ-Follower Identities: Grounds for a Distinction" (PDF). New Testament Studies. 63 (4): 493–515. doi:10.1017/S0028688517000145. hdl:11370/c3909e99-c6ef-4b40-8a63-658edc9abf54. S2CID 164991368.
