= Robert 'Dolly' Dunn =

Australian convicted child molester (1941–2009)

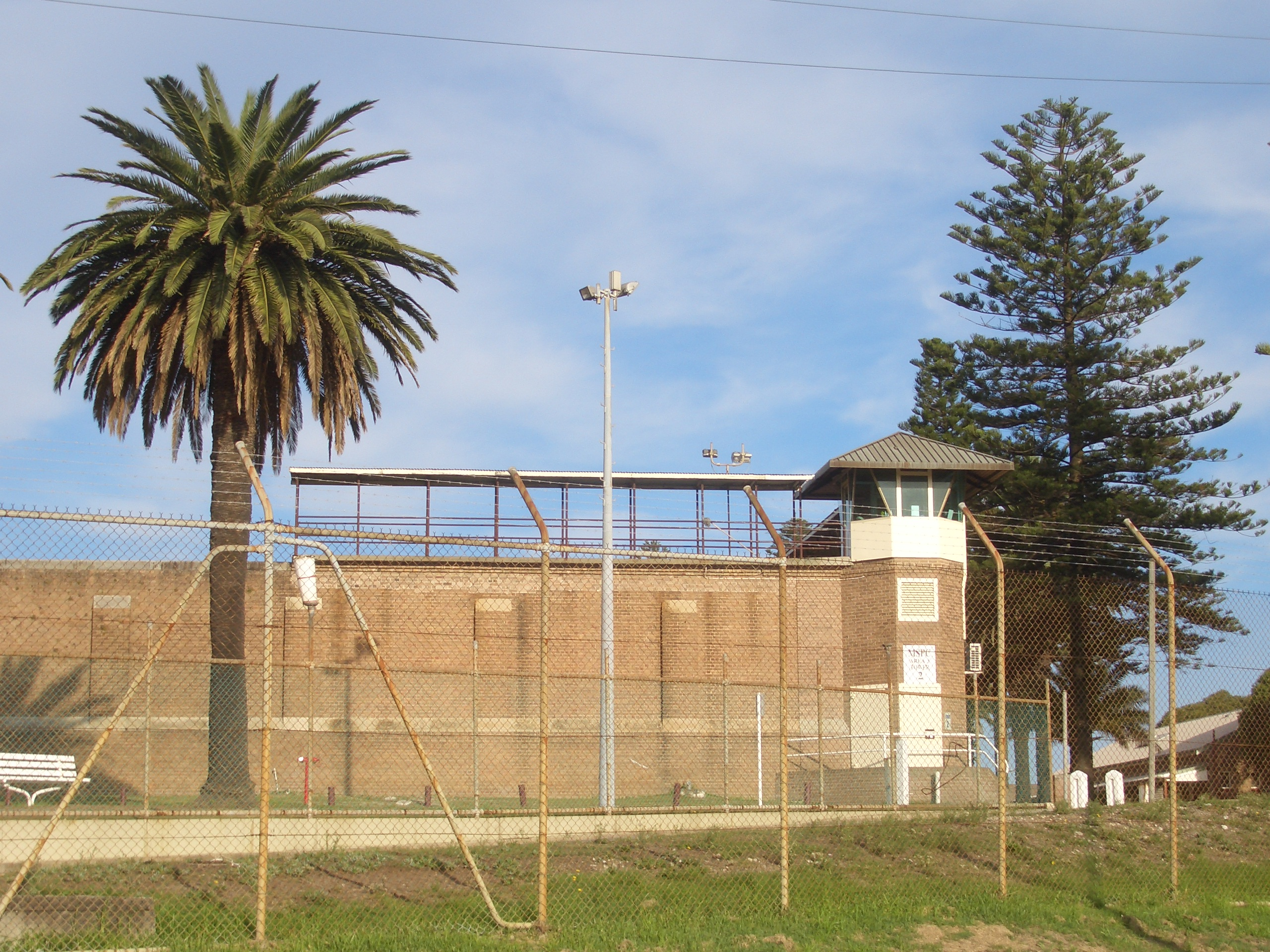
- Dunn spent the last 11 years of his life in Long Bay Correctional Centre
- Born: Robert Joseph Dunn; 30 January 1941
- Died: 11 July 2009 (aged 68); Long Bay Correctional Centre, Malabar, New South Wales, Australia
- Occupation: School teacher
- Status: Deceased
- Criminal charges: Child sexual abuse (24 charges); Supply cannabis (3 charges)
- Penalty: 20 years imprisonment 18 years non-parole period

Robert Joseph 'Dolly' Dunn (30 January 1941 – 11 July 2009) was an Australian convicted child molester. He was a school teacher by profession, working for the Marist Brothers, a Catholic religious order.

Dunn taught science at Marist Catholic College Penshurst from 1971 to 1987.

He began a 20-year jail sentence in 2001 for 24 sexual offences occurring between 1985 and 1995.

In 1996, a Royal Commission chaired by Justice James Woods was shown home videos and photographs from Dunn's collection, which included many images of child sex abuse, usually featuring Dunn himself as the perpetrator. Dunn fled the country, but was later found in Honduras after being tracked down by Australia's 60 Minutes program. Former U.S. Secretary of State Madeleine Albright authorised his extradition back to Australia after he was deported from Honduras to the United States.

Dunn had a long history of abusing boys between the ages of seven and fifteen years old, often videotaping them. Usually, he would offer them money and marijuana in exchange for anal sex. From jail, he repeatedly made written and verbal statements to the effect that he saw nothing wrong with sex between a man and a boy.

He was a friend and accomplice of Australian diplomat William Stuart Brown, another convicted child molester.

== Health issues ==
In 2004 after suffering from angina Dunn underwent coronary bypass surgery. Believed to be at high risk of retaliation from other prisoners, he was isolated from the main prison population. Dunn died on 11 July 2009, aged 68, from multiple organ failure. He would not have been eligible for parole until 9 November 2015.

== See also ==
- List of Australian criminals
