= Peter Ryan (journalist) =

Australian journalist (1960–2025)

Peter Ryan OAM
- Born: 1960
- Died: 18 July 2025 (aged 64); Sydney, Australia
- Education: Marist College Eastwood
- Years active: 1980–2025
- Employer: ABC News
- Spouse: Mary Cotter
- Children: 1

Peter Ryan OAM (1960 – 18 July 2025) was an Australian journalist who worked predominantly for the ABC News network.

== Career ==
Peter Ryan was educated at Marist College in Eastwood, a Catholic secondary all-boys school. After leaving school at age 18 he joined the Sydney afternoon tabloid The Daily Mirror, which was owned by News Limited, as a copy boy .

He was working in Sydney commercial radio before he was hired by the Australian Broadcasting Corporation in 1984. There he got envolved in ABC Radio programs AM, PM and The World Today. He also worked on media for ABC's radio channels NewsRadio, Radio National, various ABC Local Radio stations, and produced television content for the ABC News channel.

Ryan worked for the Australian Broadcasting Corporation as its senior business correspondent and editor from 2016 to 2025. He was formerly employed as the ABC's Washington bureau chief and head of TV news and current affairs in Victoria, executive producer of Business Breakfast, founding editor of Lateline Business and the ABC's business editor.

He was a member of the Media, Entertainment and Arts Alliance's Benevolent Fund, which supports journalists through difficulties.

== Personal life and death ==
Peter Ryan was married to Mary Cotter and had a daughter.

Ryan was diagnosed with metastatic thyroid cancer in 2014. He died in Sydney from the illness on 18 July 2025, at the age of 64, just weeks after retiring in late June due to ill health.

== Awards and honours ==
Ryan won a Walkley Award in 2017 for a story on money laundering taking place through Commonwealth Bank deposit machines.

In 2022, he was awarded the Order of Australia medal, for his 'service to the broadcast media as a journalist'.
