= Jane Boyd =

British artist (born 1953)

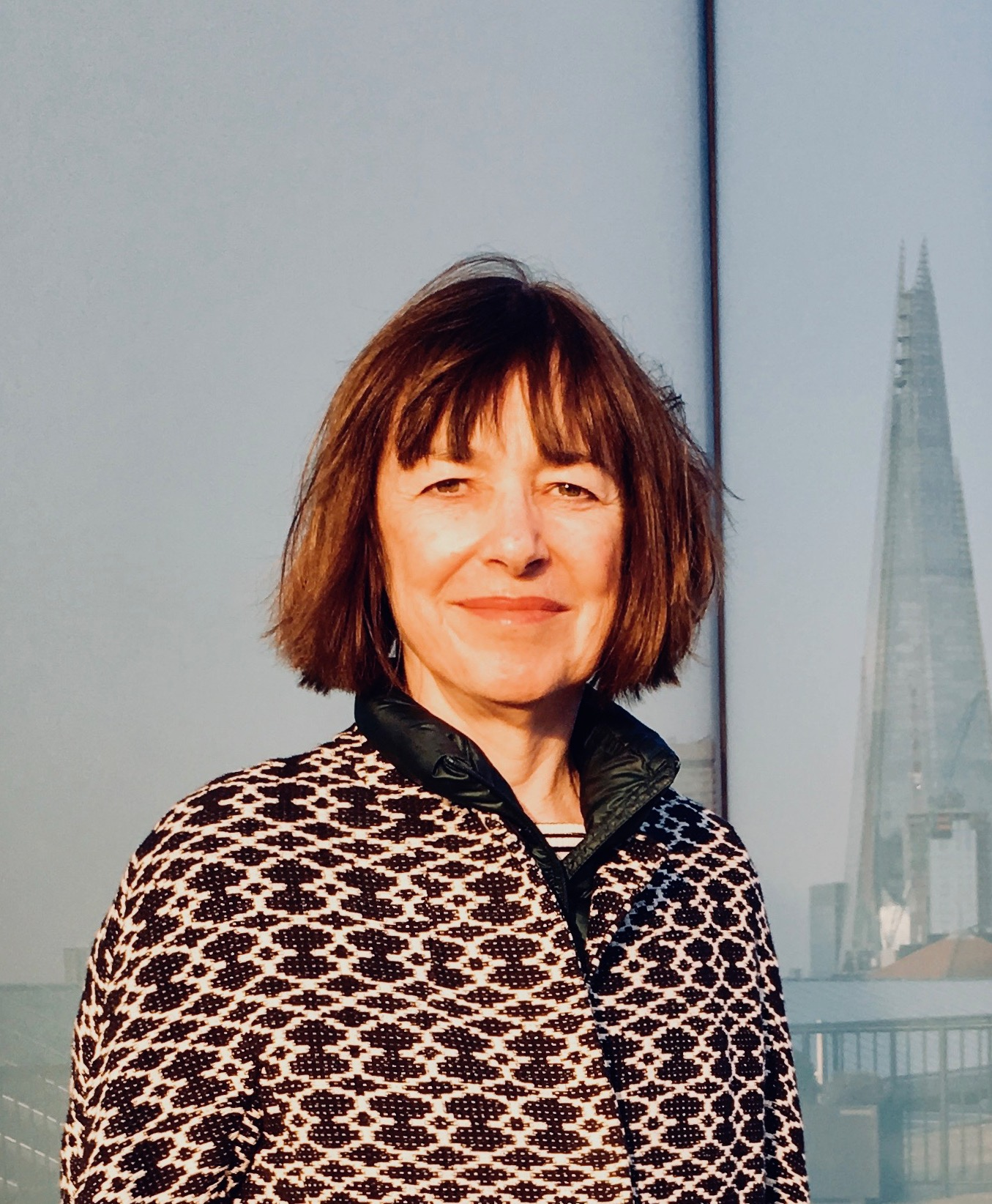
- Born: 20 June 1953 (age 72); London, UK
- Education: Camberwell College of Arts, University of London
- Awards: Fellow Commoner in Creative Arts Trinity College, Cambridge (1981–83); Abbey Rome Fellow 1998; Rome Scholar 1999; Leverhulme Trust Artist-in-Residence at The Warburg Institute, University of London (2001); Leverhulme Trust Research Fellowship (2006); Brown Foundation Fellow at the Dora Maar House (2011); Fellow of the Royal Society of Arts (2011)
- Website: janeboyd.co.uk

Jane Boyd (born 20 June 1953) is a British artist. She is best known for her work in light-based installation and drawing and has been exhibiting internationally since 1986. Boyd was the first woman to be elected Fellow Commoner in Creative Arts, a two-year fellowship (1981–83) awarded by Trinity College, Cambridge. Her work is represented in a number of public collections including the Victoria & Albert Museum, the Gibberd Gallery and the British Museum.

== Career ==
Boyd won The Shell Waterloo Painting 1981 prize, a major competitive commission awarded by Shell UK to produce a painting measuring 3 m x 10 m for exhibition above the South Bank exit of London Waterloo station. Filmed by the BBC throughout its progress in the studio and on site, the result was a large canvas entitled Generation of Alternatives. The same year she exhibited in Summer Show 1, along with Andrew Darke, Andy Goldsworthy and Steve Joy at the Serpentine Gallery, London. Boyd concentrated on colour field painting until 1990 when ideas concerning the interdependence of time, memory and consciousness demanded a new medium able to express the inherent temporal nature of these concepts. Light itself would replace paint while in the drawings, charcoal dust would become the primary medium.

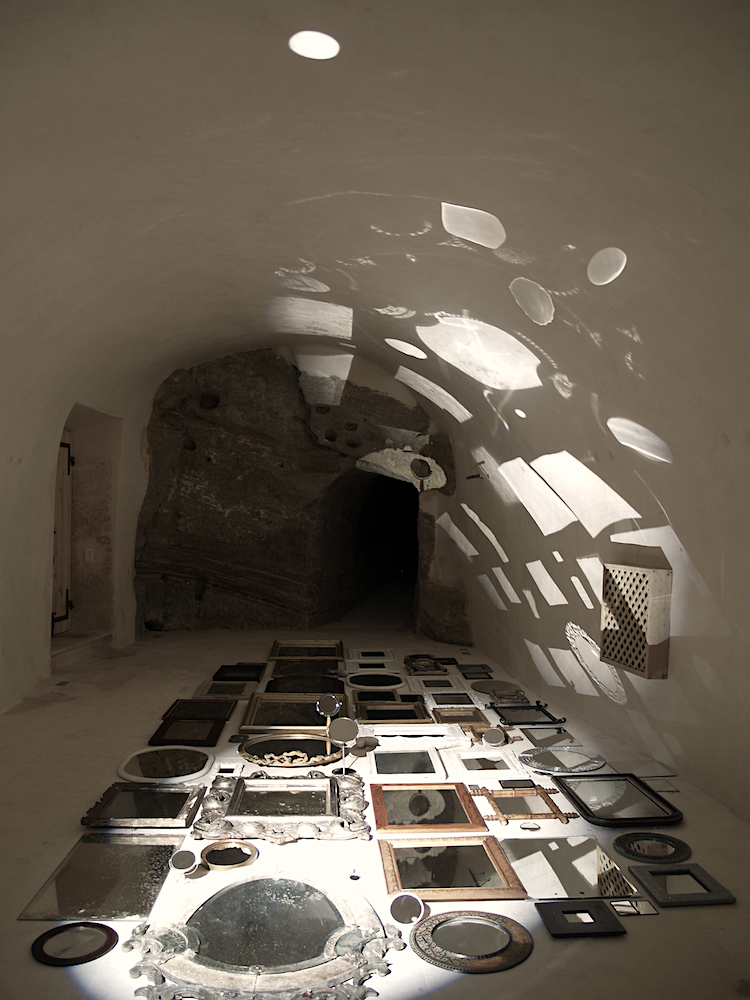
Vacant Possession 2011 by Jane Boyd, Dora Maar House

Beginning with the series, Water Course i–iii (1993) using plaster dust, mirror and projected light, Boyd's installations would experiment with refraction and reflection. In 1995, Boyd exhibited To the Warder of Things Present, a solo exhibition at Stichting de Achterstraat, Hoorn, Netherlands.

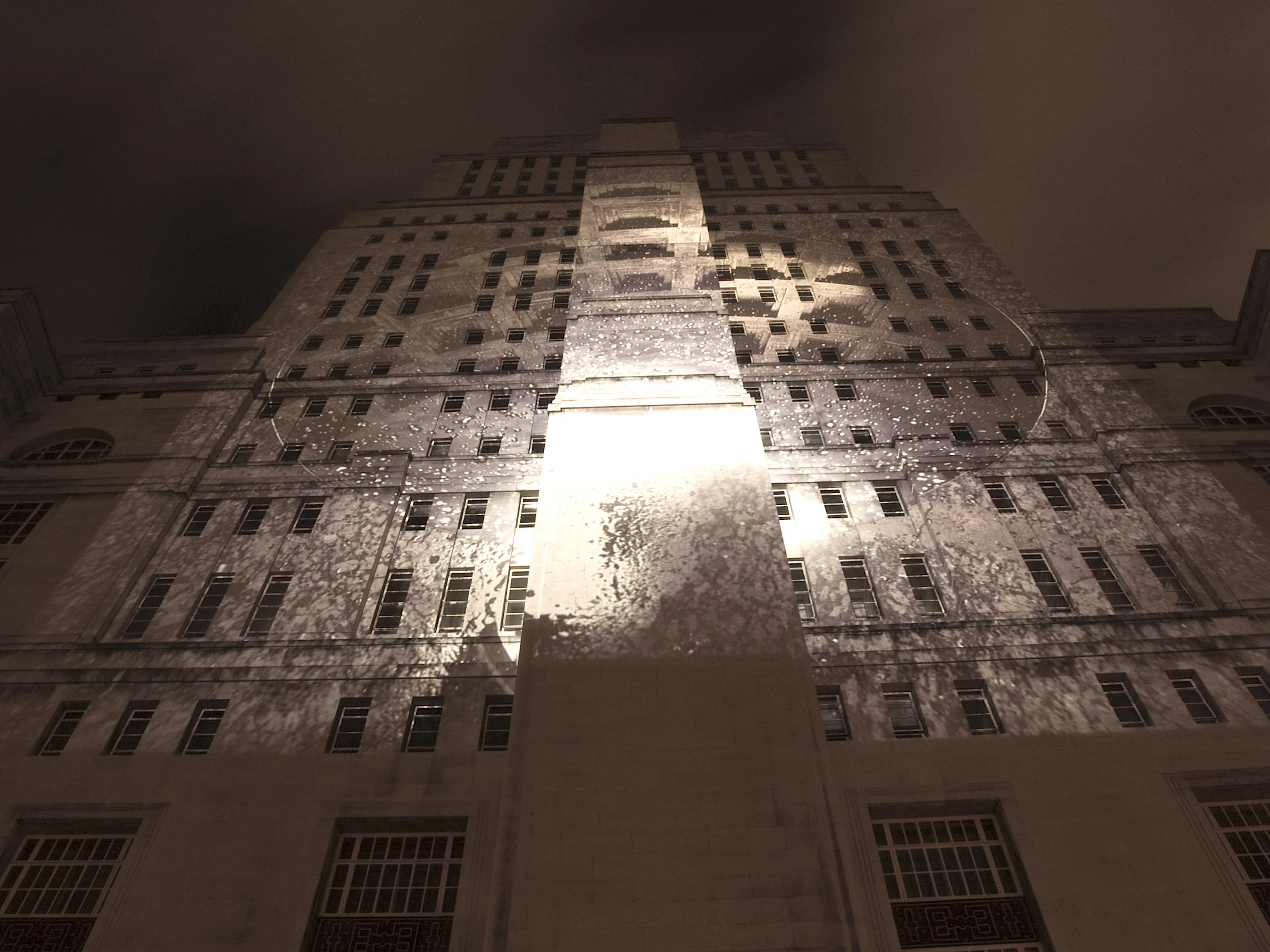
Concrete Liaisons 2006 by Jane Boyd, Senate House Tower, London

In 1999 she exhibited Out of Bounds in May Show at the British School at Rome. Also that year, in No Added Sugar, a group show with Kate Davis and Terry Smith curated by Roberto Annecchini at Change Studio d'Arte Contemporanea, Boyd exhibited It was Today and in Grottesche curated by Domenico Scudero she exhibited Gathering Worlds at Ex-chiesa di S. Stefano, Tivoli. Boyd's site-specific installation, Chancing the Circle (1999) was installed in the Pantheon, Rome in May 1999.

One example of her use of natural light and mirror is Perfect Stranger (2000), which explores, at a particular moment, the sense of place contained within the surfaces and cavities of a moulded ceiling. Boyd exhibited with Tessa Garland in Seeing Things (2004), a group show at Newlyn Art Gallery, Cornwall. Boyd's Living Memory (1988) Artspace Sydney, Australia and Grounded in Time 1989 University of Surrey Guildford, UK are examples of solo exhibitions which featured large-scale drawing installations. Boyd's work, Water Haulage iii (1991) was selected for the 10th Cleveland International Drawing Biennale (1991).

In conclusion of a Residency at the Warburg Institute, University of London, Boyd exhibited two works Double Volume (2001) and Palindrome (2001), a transcription of Las Meninas (1656) by Diego Velázquez. In 2006 Boyd returned to the University of London as Leverhulme Trust Research Fellow to engage in a new work entitled Concrete Liaisons (2006), a major light-based installation for the facades of Senate House Tower, Malet Street London. In 2011 she was appointed Brown Foundation Fellow, a fellowship programme administered by the Museum of Fine Arts Houston at Dora Maar House, Ménerbes, France. Boyd's installation Vacant Possession (2011) was sited on the ground floor of former home of surrealist photographer Dora Maar.

== Honours and awards ==
- 2011 Fellow of the Royal Society of Arts
- 2011 Brown Foundation Fellow at the Dora Maar House, Ménerbes
- 2006 Leverhulme Trust Research Fellowship
- 2001 Leverhulme Trust Artist-in-Residence at The Warburg Institute, University of London
- 1999 Rome Scholar
- 1998 Abbey Rome Fellow, British School at Rome
- 1981–83 Fellow Commoner in Creative Arts Trinity College, Cambridge
- 1980–81 Shell Waterloo Painting 1981 commissioned by Shell UK
- 1978 ACGB Arts Council Fine Arts Award in Painting

== Major works ==
- Generation of Alternatives (Shell Waterloo Painting, 1981)
- Out of Bounds (the British School at Rome, 1999)
- Chancing the Circle (the Pantheon, Rome, 1999)
- Palindrome (the Warburg Institute, University of London, 2001)
- Double Volume (the Warburg Institute, University of London, 2001)
- Concrete Liaisons (Senate House Tower, London, 2006)
- Vacant Possession (Dora Maar House, 2011)

== Public collections ==
- 2005 – The New Hall Art Collection, Murray Edwards College, Cambridge
- 2004 – The British Library, London
- 2000 – Prints and Drawings Collection, The British Museum, London
- 1994 – Usher Gallery, Lincolnshire County Council
- 1993 – Prints and Drawings Collection Victoria & Albert Museum, London
- 1981 – Gibberd Gallery – run by the Harlow art trust (HAT) since 2011

== Publications ==
- Boyd, Jane (2011). "Place in Vertical Space: the Rising Skyline in the Urban Environment and the Primacy of Place". Etnofoor. 23 (1): 144–170. ISSN 0921-5158. JSTOR 23217886.
- Boyd, Jane (2008). "Senate House Tower: the Capital's First Skyscraper". The London Journal. 33 (3). Maney Publishing: 249–269. doi:10.1179/174963208X347718. ISSN 0305-8034.
- Boyd, Jane (1 November 2006). "Picture This: Velázquez' Christ with Martha and Mary". The Expository Times. 118 (2). Sage Journals: 70–77. doi:10.1177/0014524606070862. ISSN 0014-5246.
- Boyd, Jane; Esler, Philip F. (2004). Visuality & Biblical Text: Interpreting Velázquez "Christ with Martha and Mary" as a Test Case. Arte e Archeologia. Vol. 26. Florence: Leo S. Olschki. ISBN 88-222-5369-8.
- Jane Boyd, Waterways drawings 1990–1992, forward Felix Villanueva, 1992
