= Marist Catholic College Penshurst =

Marist Catholic College Penshurst - Penshurst Marist Brothers

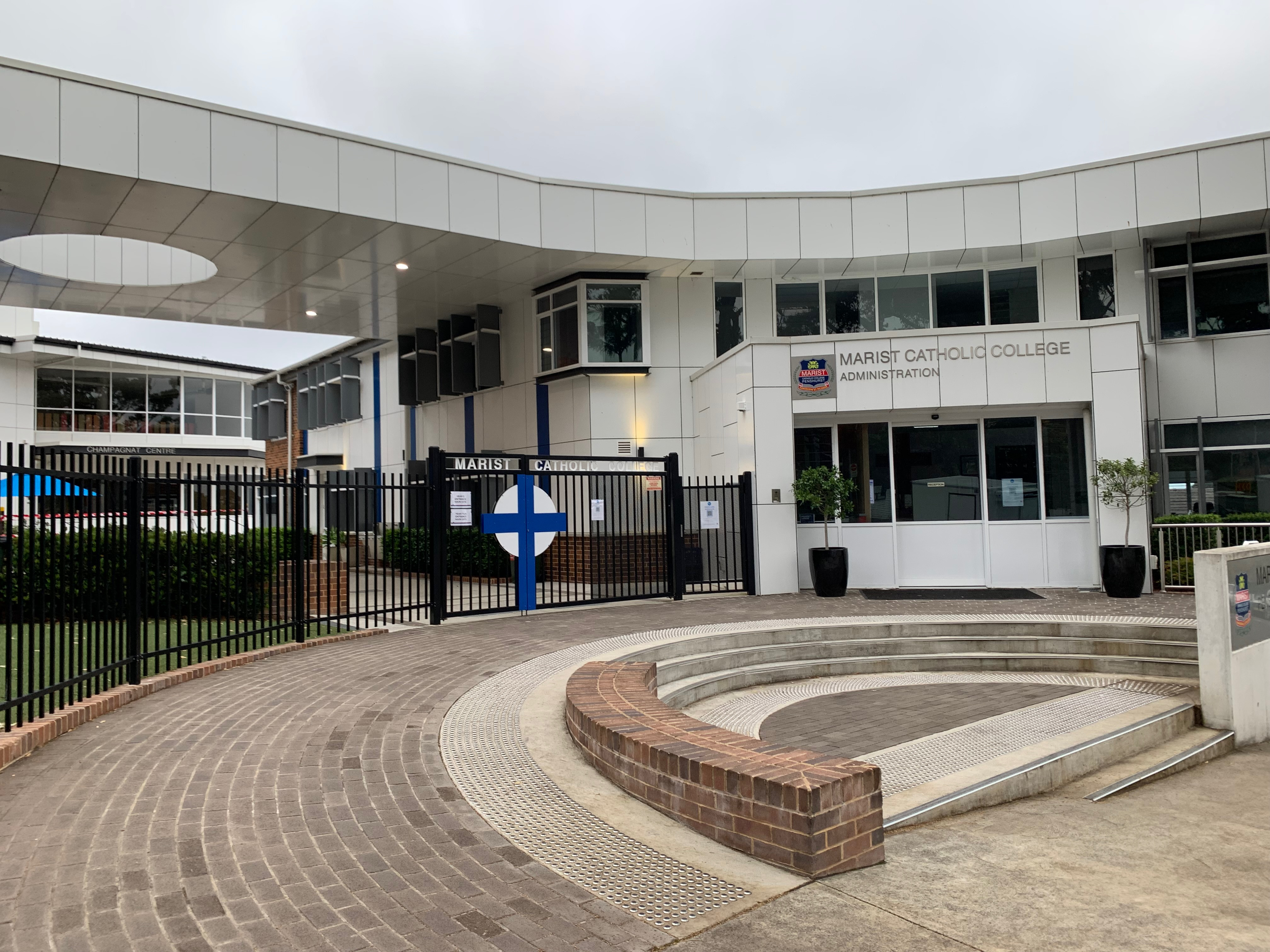
- MCCP Façade as of November 2021

Location
- Sydney, New South Wales; Australia; 33°58′03″S 151°04′59″E

Information
- Type: Independent Co-educational secondary day school
- Motto: Latin: Agnoscere et Diligere (To Know and To Love)
- Religious affiliation: Marist Brothers
- Denomination: Roman Catholic
- Patron saint: Saint Marcellin Champagnat
- Established: 1953
- Educational authority: New South Wales Department of Education
- Oversight: Catholic Education Office of the Archdiocese of Sydney
- Principal: Connie Frino
- Staff: 96 (2020)
- Years: 7–12
- Gender: Boys and girls
- Enrolment: 999 (2020)
- Houses: Leopold; More; Dunstan; Salvius
- Colours: Red, yellow, green, blue
- Slogan: "I will always hold you in the palm of my hand" (Isaiah 41:13)
- Affiliation: Association of Marist Schools of Australia
- Website: maristpenshurst.syd.catholic.edu.au

Marist Catholic College Penshurst is an independent systemic Roman Catholic co-educational secondary school located in Penshurst, a southern suburb of Sydney, Australia. The school currently caters for approximately 1000 students from Years 7 to 12. Since 2020, the school has been split among two campuses, Years 7–8 at South Hurstville, and Years 9–12 at the original site in Mortdale (commonly referred to as being in Penshurst).

== History ==
The school first opened on 27 January 1953 as Marist Brothers Penshurst. It was established by Father Joseph Breen, the Parish Priest of St Declan's, when Marist College Kogarah could no longer accommodate students from the Penshurst area. The school was run by Marist Brothers, Brother Leopold Smith, the first principal of the school, Brother Basil and Brother Sixtus.

Brother Thomas More Davison took over as Principal in 1960 and oversaw construction of the oval area.

In 1962, Marist College Penshurst became a Fourth Form school under the Wyndham Scheme.

Marist College Penshurst celebrated their Diamond Jubilee in 2013.

In 2015, the school was renamed Marist Catholic College Penshurst and became a 7–12 co-educational high school.

The 2016 Royal Commission into Institutional Responses to Child Sexual Abuse identified two infamous paedophiles, Br Kostka (John) Chute, who was Primary School Principal from 1970 to 1972 and former Science Teacher Robert 'Dolly' Dunn. (From 1970 to 1988). In 2009, Dunn died in gaol while serving his sentence. Another schoolteacher, Greg Hammond was charged with Historical Child Sexual Abuse, committed during the late 1970s and early 1980s. Bill 'Jedda' Allen, a former Science Teacher was also identified as a Paedophile, but he was murdered in 1988, before he could be charged.

In 2020, Brother Tony Butler was a significant member of the college community, despite the Marist Brothers' community withdrawal from the college at the end of 1980. The college continued to be run by a Marist Brother until 2005 under Brother John McDonnell FMS. In 2006, Mr. Tony Duncan was appointed as the first lay Principal and marked the end of 53 years of Marist leadership at the College. However despite this, as the only Brother left at the school, the Marist spirit and legacy continued to be nurtured and valued under his role acting as the school community's pastoral assistant, as well as an important symbol of the College's history and values. The school also expanded to become dual-campus with the new South Hurstville campus allowing for accommodation of years 7–8 while 9–12 remained at the Mortdale campus. There are plans for the South Hurstville Campus to be expanded to a 7-9 campus in the future, with the Mortdale campus becoming a "senior" campus of 10-12.

Former student and primary schoolteacher, Paul Bateman OAM died suddenly on 9 August 2021. He was also the artistic director of the Marist Singers of NSW and the Young Sydney Singers. He began teaching at Penshurst Marist in 1977.

== Annual events ==
Important annual events held by Marist Catholic College Penshurst include:

- Swimming Carnival
- Athletics Carnival
- Multicultural Food Festival
- Music/Talent concert
- Champagnat Day (held closest to his feast day on 6 June)

== CoCurricula ==
Students participate in representative cocurricula competitions, including:

- CBSA (Christian Brothers Sports Association) – athletics, basketball, cross country, rugby league, swimming, touch football and volleyball
- CCC (Combined Catholic Colleges) athletics, cross country and swimming
- SCC (Sydney Catholic Colleges Sports Association) – since 2015 when the school became co-educational; volleyball, netball, basketball, football, touch footy and softball
- Arthur Morris Cup - cricket
- Berg Shield - cricket
- Bill Turner Cup - football
- Pan Pacific Games (international)
- St George Knockout Competition - rugby league
- CSDA (Catholic Schools Debating Association) - public speaking
- Regional Catholic Schools Debating Competition - debating
- Marist Oratory - public speaking
- da Vinci Decathlon - interschool competition

Regular weekly sport is also available to students, as well as other lunchtime clubs.

== Change to a co-educational system and name change ==
The school was originally established as Marist Brothers Penshurst (re-named Penshurst Marist High in the early 1980s, then as Marist College Penshurst in 1997, a cohort year 7–10 feeder Marist Brothers College junior high school for Marist College Kogarah in Bexley when Kogarah Marist could no longer accommodate the boys from the Penshurst area in 1953. This was until in 2015, Marist College Penshurst introduced its first co-educational cohort and expanded to year 7–12 and resultantly changed its name to Marist Catholic College Penshurst. In 2020 the college became dual-campus with its own feeder school in South Hurstville to accommodate for years 7–8 cohort. Accordingly, the college crest and colours were altered slightly and added blue to the original red, green and gold to reflect the co-educational change, while navy replaced the previous red and green stripes with the college name now contained within the bottom of badge of the crest where the stripes previously were instead of in an external banner above the badge on the previous iteration of the college crest.

== Notable alumni ==
- Mark Coure – Australian politician
- Matt Dufty – rugby league player
- Chris Holland – musician and member of both Australian bands Operator Please and Colour Coding
- Daryl Millard and Ryan Millard – brothers who are both rugby league footy players and Fiji international team representatives
- Craig Nicholls – musician and frontman of The Vines
- Andy Wright – Australian Oscar Winner – Sound Guru
- Daniel Batman - Olympian
