= Marist College Eastwood =

- College Crest

Location
- 44 Hillview Road, Eastwood, Sydney, New South Wales; 2122; Australia; 33°47′20″S 151°04′39″E

Information
- Former name: St Kevin's Boys' School; Marist Brothers' High School, Eastwood
- Type: Independent single-sex secondary day school
- Mottoes: Motto: Latin: Respice Finem (Look to the Future); Slogan: A Daring Faith, A Dynamic Education, A Holistic Personhood
- Religious affiliation: Marist Brothers
- Denomination: Roman Catholicism
- Patron saint: Marcellin Champagnat
- Established: 2 February 1937; 89 years ago (as St Kevin's Boys' School)
- Sister school: Marist Sisters' College, Woolwich
- School board: Sydney Catholic Schools
- Educational authority: New South Wales Department of Education, New South Wales Education Standards Authority
- President: Peter Turner
- Principal: David Sullivan
- Staff: ~100
- Faculty: Creative and Performing Arts, English, HSIE, LOTE, Mathematics, PD/H/PE, Youth Ministry, Science and TAS
- Years: 7–12
- Gender: Boys
- Enrolment: 973 (2025)
- Schedule: 8:30 am – 2:50 pm, 8:30 am - 2:30 pm (Thursday)
- Campuses: A, B, C, D, and E Blocks, Montagne Centre, Boardroom, Senior Study Room, Demountables, Cottages, Library, Gym, Monastery
- Campus size: 19,000 m^{2} (1.9 hectares)
- Campus type: Suburban
- Houses: Cusack; Elliot; Leopold; Maloney
- Colours: Red, black and yellow
- Song: Sub Tuum
- Athletics: Sydney Catholic School Sport (SCS), NSW Combined Catholic Colleges (CCC)
- National ranking: 114 (2024 HSC)
- Publication: Yearsbook: Etchings Newsletter: Musings
- Affiliation: Association of Marist Schools of Australia, Sydney Catholic Schools
- Alumni: Old Boys
- Website: maristeastwood.syd.catholic.edu.au

Marist College Eastwood is an independent Roman Catholic single-sex secondary day school for boys, located in Eastwood, Sydney, New South Wales, Australia.

== History ==
As a Marist school, Marist College Eastwood traces its inception to Marcellin Champagnat, a Catholic Priest and Pastor of La Valla in France who established the order of the Marist Brothers in 1817. Emphasising equality and support for all students, regardless of circumstance or privilege, Champagnat is considered the forefather of the Marist institution worldwide.

From establishing these Brothers, the first Marist School in Australia, St Patrick's, was established in 1872 by four Marist Brothers: Ludovic Laboureyras, Jarlath Finand, Augustinus McDonald and Peter Tennyson, at The Rocks in Sydney.

On 2 February 1937, Brother Leopold Smith and three other Marist brothers (Brothers Ervan McDonough, Loyola Sullivan, and Kenneth Harris) came to Eastwood and opened St Kevin's Boys' School, with 100 students. The school was established on the site of Eastwood House, the home built by William Rutledge and purchased by Edward Terry in 1863. Terry became the first mayor of Eastwood and later a member of the New South Wales Legislative Assembly, and Eastwood House, with its extensive gardens, orchards and sporting grounds, was the location of many hunts. The house, built in 1840 and extended in 1863, forms the central administration block for the College today, having been purchased by the Catholic Church using the Vatican's finances in 1929. The building's awnings, roofing, window panelling and structural support was renovated in 1990, and has since been partially rendered as recently as 2019. In further developments, the school purchased the remaining front terraces it was neighboured by, being preserved and renovated to serve as classroom and administrative spaces as three separate 'cottages'. These buildings have since been heritage listed by the City of Ryde local government area.

The school's colours, being red, yellow and black were chosen for their iconic relation to the North Sydney Bears Rugby League team. The colours have since become an integral part of the school community, being used as a distinguishing scheme for school uniforms, musings and other media.

Following its founding as 'St Kevin's Boys' School', the 1960s saw the school being named as Marist Brothers' High School, Eastwood. In this timeframe, male students from the adjoined St Kevin's Primary School would graduate by Year 4, joining the college aged 10 in Year 5. All teachers and administrative peoples were part of the Marist Brothers or another religious missionary group, and would receive funding for the school from the local parish church and parents. To aid expansionary numbers of students, the parish allocated funding to build a new academic complex in the early 1970s, now used as the school's main science and HSIE faculty building. However, such a system was short-lived, with the Sydney Catholic Archdiocese ordering a change in curriculum and pastoral-related development that would necessitate students graduating to the college two years later in Year 6, now the final year of primary school in Australia. By 1985, the early adoption of students in a 'primary' based stream was abolished, with the school still accommodating its remaining enrolments from Year 5 and 6. Following the influx of lay teachers and other external personnel, notably with the appointment of the college's first lay principal in 1987, the name of the school was changed on 2 April 1993 to Marist College Eastwood. This was coupled with the school's transition away from the sole governance of the Marist Brothers, whose authority was amalgamated to what is now recognised as the Catholic Education Office of Sydney, or Sydney Catholic Schools. Today, Marist College Eastwood is known as a 'systemic catholic school', meaning that funding from the community is directed to the Sydney Catholic Schools body, who are responsible for adequately redistributing the resources gathered to meet the different financial needs across school communities.

In 1972, Brother Oswin McKinney formed the Marist Singers of Eastwood, they performed in "Carmen" a musical and in 1974 were the official choir in "Joseph's Technicolor Dream Coat" which performed at the Seymour Centre, with Mark Holden. In 1977, the late Paul Bateman OAM became the Artistic Director and produced a record called "I'm a Song, Sing Me". At the same time, Penshurst Marist boys joined the Choir and later, Hamilton Marist boys. Also in 1977, the Choir performed the opening song for the movie, Break Of Day. The choir in 1978, changed its name to The Marist Singers Of NSW. Br Cyril Quinlan was the Manager, with Paul Bateman OAM as Artistic Director. And in 1978 they toured Canberra and Melbourne, singing in concert with the National Boys Choir.

In April 1999, teacher and student representatives of the school were sent to Rome, joining with other teachers and students from Marist Schools around the world to celebrate the canonisation of Marcellin Champagnat.

Through the turn of the century, the school has celebrated numerous events and experienced several renovations. In 1982, the graduating class of Year 12 donated a flagpole for use in the main school yard. This gesture was repeated in 2010, with a secondary flagpole purchased by the leaving students. The poles are now used to raise the Australian and Aboriginal flags during each morning administration period. In 2006, the backyard area of the acquired cottages was resurfaced, irrigated and landscaped to become a grass playground. The area was later redeveloped into a synthetic grass area fenced by a cage. In 2010, the college's library underwent significant redevelopment - being reopened as the 'Father Peter Ryan Learning Centre', aided through a government grant of $200,000 from the now defunct National School Pride Program, instilled by the Rudd Government in 2009. In the same year, laptops were deployed to all students in accordance with the National Secondary School Computer Fund. Being beneficial to backpack weight, academic research and technological integration, laptops remain in use throughout the school; albeit in a BYOD (bring your own device) scheme.

In 2012, the school celebrated its 75th anniversary at St Mary's Cathedral, with the college's first enrolled boy, Jim Maloney, in attendance. In February 2017, the college celebrated its 80th anniversary, coinciding with the 200th year of Marist-led education in Australia. In 2015, following an extensive 10-year planning process, the multi-purpose 'Montagne Centre' was built on the fringe of the college campus, facilitating greater enrolment capacity and recreational activities. In anticipation for the centre's construction, students established a YouTube channel documenting the process of its creation, titled 'MCETV' in 2014. The channel is currently used to publicise commentary on wider school life, including sport reports, academic events and 'Malloy Cup' proceedings, and often livestreams content pertaining to school assemblies and other internally based material.

In 2019, the school refurbished a variety of classrooms, installing new chairs, tables and other technology. The main renovations were made to A-Block, installing new carpet flooring and overhanging LED lights. Some classroom walls were also rendered, with a set of wooden facades placed on each room's ceiling for decorative purposes. Furthermore, most closed windows were replaced with a single sliding door. The main college offices were also renovated with the same new interior design.

In 2020, the college transitioned away from its traditional Latin motto of 'Respice Finem', replacing its past ubiquity on all school material with a slogan describing 'A Daring Faith', 'A Dynamic Education' and a 'Holistic Personhood'. The Latin phrase, however, remains on the college crest.

In 2021, with an additional variety of grants and other monetary support, the school erected several demountable structures at the once vacant block adjacent to Shaftsbury Road, accounting for further enrolment expansions. Other classrooms and previously defunct facilities in the cottages in C-Block were additionally renovated, and are now used as speciality classes and office spaces. With an emphasis on environmental sustainability, the college has also installed solar panels on the library, now formerly known as the Father Peter Ryan Learning Centre. This facility, having been renovated in 2010, was rendered and redesigned once again in 2021 with new interiors and solar powered electricity generation. Furthermore, an indigenous mural was placed on the face of the library building itself, representing the Wallumettagal people associated with the Ryde, Hunters Hill and Parramatta regions.

In 2022, the college celebrated 85 years of existence. B-Block was renovated through removing two administration offices on the ground level in order to add an additional classroom. The scaffolding staircase accompanying the demountable buildings were removed, with a permanent concrete stairwell and walkway installed.

In 2023, the school renovated the existing Champagnat Court area, installing new outdoor seating and a painting a walkway in place of the existing handball courts. The Creative and Performing Arts rooms located in the A-block precinct was refurbished with new TV equipment and drones to support the college's ongoing MCETV initiative. In 2024, the college renovated the basketball courtyard behind E-Block with an acrylic surface.

== House system ==
There are four houses, all of which are named after people who have contributed to the development of the school:

House	Colours	Motto	Namesake
Maloney	Sky blue, dark blue	Facta non Verba – Deeds not words	Named after Father Jim Maloney, the first enrolled student at the college in 1937. Maloney later became a Vincentian priest, and served as the superior of the community at St. Stanislaus Bathurst until his death in 2019.
Elliott	Green, gold	Ad Meliora Contende – Strive for better	Named after local chemist, J.W Elliott, who donated 3,386 pounds (equivalent to roughly $320,000 AUD) to fund the creation of the College to be built behind Eastwood House.
Cusack	Dark green, black	Ad Sidera Contende – Strive for the stars	Named after Father Cusack, the parish priest at St. Kevin's Church who lobbied the Marist Brothers to found the current school on the then vacant block of land next to the parish.
Leopold	Yellow, burgundy	Audaces Fortuna Iuvat – Fortune favours the bold	Named after Brother Leopold Smith, the first principal of the college, then known as St Kevin's Boys' School; who provided "much needed direction" for the school's forthcoming developments. Smith led the college from 1937 until 1943.

Since 2005, students have been provided with "house shirts" to be worn at sporting carnivals as a means to display their affiliation to a particular house. The shirts are often worn by students on sport-related events and other pastoral activities.

Throughout the school year, students compete for these houses in an athletics and swimming carnival. From the results garnered from these events, the 'Malloy Cup' is a trophy presented to the winning house at the conclusion of the school year for the aggregated sporting and academic achievements of pupils. The trophy is often regarded as a competitive element of college life, as students contribute points in an attempt to attain it for the house they represent. The competition is named in honour of Frank Malloy, a former principal of the college serving from 1999 to 2003.

== Sport, spirituality and extracurricular activities ==
The school was formally a member of the now defunct Metropolitan Catholic Schools Sports Association (MCS) competition, where they played against schools in Sydney's metropolitan region. MCS sports included association football, rugby sevens, cricket, swimming, Australian rules football, tennis, basketball, athletics, triathlon, golf, volleyball, and rugby league.

In 2021, the school joined the Sydney Catholic Schools Sports Association (SCS), an expanded continuation of the MCS competition where a greater variety of sports were offered for the first time, including diving, baseball and mountain biking.

Additionally, the college offers the opportunity for students to compete in chess, public speaking, debating, musical bands, and the Duke of Edinburgh's Award. Furthermore, the Maths Challenge for Young Australians is held annually, measuring student scores in abstract mathematical problems and logistical reasoning.

In 2009, the school's rugby 10s team won the NSW Rugby Tens Championships. Only 22 points were scored against them in the entire series.

Over a 10-year period, the College was known to have dominated in regional swimming events and competitions, being described as a 'decade of dominance'. In 2014, the school won its tenth championship in a row at the Metropolitan Catholic Schools Swimming meet.

On a triennial cycle, school staff and students part-take in the ceremonies of World Youth Day, an event coordinated by the Catholic Church to collate international communities of young adults to a singular venue within a given country. When the event was held in Sydney, in 2008, student representatives gathered in the eastern suburbs to see the speech of Pope Benedict XVI at the Randwick Racecourse. The most recent event was held in the Portuguese city of Lisbon in 2023. Likewise, the Australian Catholic Youth Festival is a biennial national event at which the school participates in, with the most recent gathering occurring in Perth in 2019.

Likewise, the college annually raises funds for the Project Compassion initiative, organised by missionary group Caritas Australia. Various school-wide events and initiatives occur in anticipation for donations and other monetary support in pastoral activity.

Under the guidance of Sydney Catholic Schools, the school student body participates in the 10:10 Project, a youth ministry initiative that connects them to other schools in the network.

Moreover, the school actively organises a 'European Tour' within a similar 3-year timeframe. With a cultural and religious group of students selected for travel, the college's representatives visit the significant sites of Marcellin Champagnat in France, whilst participating in viewing various sporting events across the western portions of the continent. The cultural group often sends an association football and rugby union team to compete against local sporting academies and schools in the touring region.

In a similar tradition, an 'Immersion Tour' is often organised, generally for students to visit a disadvantaged country or location within Australia for the purpose of humanitarian and missionary principles. However, this annual occurrence was disrupted as a result of the COVID-19 pandemic.

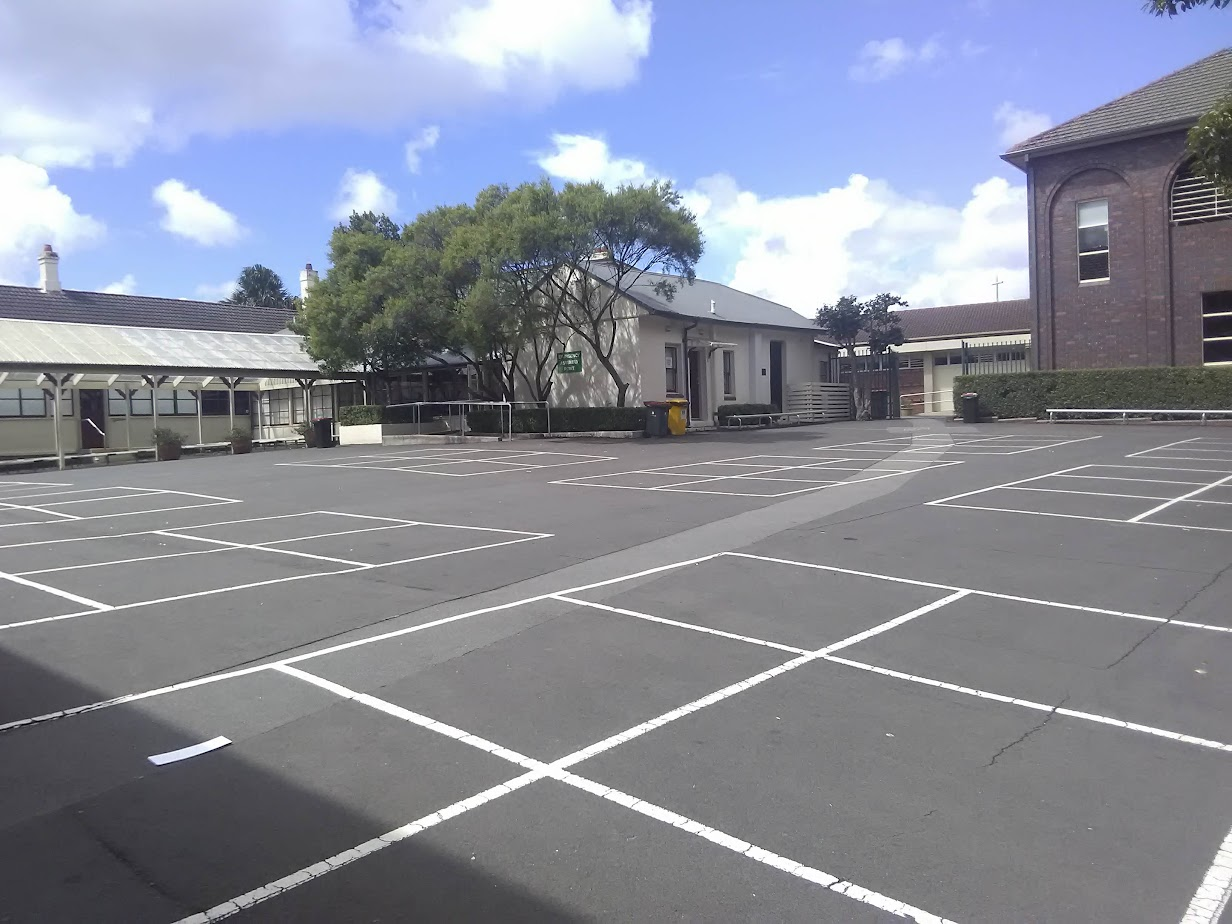
Champagnat Court (pictured facing Eastwood House) is Marist College Eastwood's main courtyard.

The college actively organises an annual 'Market Day', where the wider school community contributes consumer items for purchase in a marketplace-like environment to raise funding for a particular charitable or tangible cause. The school also hosts an 'Open Day', where prospective parents can view the college's contents and characteristics through meeting staff and student members.

Student representatives are often invited to participate in the City of Ryde's Granny Smith Festival Parade, raising publicity and awareness for the local region.

== Tuition ==
Under compliance with the New South Wales Education Standards Authority, Marist College Eastwood offers all subjects in the organisation's 'Category A' section; at minimum through a remote or distance learning model. 'Category B' courses, often known as 'Non-ATAR' subjects, are additionally offered dependent on teacher availability and interested students.

For students who wish to leave the college by Year 10, yet still wish to undertake further tertiary studies, a bridging and feeder college for vocational education - Southern Catholic College - is located in the Sydney suburb of Burwood, offering a variety of programs to accommodate apprenticeships, traineeships and other physical skills.

== Principals ==
Being of religious and lay affiliations, the following individuals have served as Principals of Marist College Eastwood:

Ordinal	Headmaster	Term start	Term end	Time in office
1	Br Leopold Smith FMS	1937	1942	5 years
2	Br Peter Carrick FMS	1943	1945	2 years
3	Br Thomas Francis Doolan FMS	1946	1951	5 years
4	Br Terence Mullany FMS	1952	1954	2 years
5	Br Aelred Wilson FMS	1955	1959	4 years
6	Br Gildas Goodwin FMS	1960	1964	4 years
7	Br Patrick Butler FMS	1965	1967	2 years
8	Br Lionel Charlton FMS	1968	1972	4 years
9	Br Raymond Mulvogue FMS	1973	1976	3 years
10	Br Cryus Callaghan FMS	1977	1980	3 years
11	Br William Connell FMS	1981	1986	5 years
12	Mr Denis Habermann	1987	1998	11 years
13	Mr Frank Malloy	1999	2003	4 years
14	Mr Michael Blowes	2004	2007	3 years
15	Mr Daniel Delmage	2008	2016	8 years
16	Mr Mark Woolford	2017	2017	1 year
17	Mr Anthony Boys	2018	2020	2 years
18	Ms Silvana Rossetti	2021	2025	4 years
19	Mr David Sullivan	2026		incumbent

== School song ==
As with many Marist Schools, the official school song of Marist College Eastwood is the Suub Tuum (eng. Under thy Protection), the earliest recorded Marian Prayer and Hymn dedicated towards the Patron of the Marist Brothers, Mary. The song is sung at the conclusion of college assemblies and Masses, as well as victory chant after a win in representatives sport.

== Controversy ==
The former principal, Brother Patrick (Thomas Butler), was adversely named in the Royal Commission into Institutional Responses to Child Sexual Abuse. Marist Brother Dacian (Kevin Jewell) was convicted and sentenced in early 2021 for abuse he committed during his time at Marist Brothers Eastwood in the 1960s. In Sydney District Court in 1995, aged 41, Phillip John Hardy was sentenced to 11 years' jail (with a minimum of seven years before parole) for sexual offences committed against a boy during an eight-year period, in 1978-1986, when the boy was aged from 8 to 16. During the time of the offences, Hardy was teaching at Marist Brothers College, Eastwood, Sydney, where he was in charge of "religious studies".

== Notable alumni ==
Marist College Eastwood is registered with the New South Wales Education Standards Authority, and has gradually improved its HSC result rankings over the last decade. In 2023, the college achieved its highest ever HSC ranking of 93. The majority of graduating students enter tertiary enrolment to a university, with the local Macquarie University the most reported post-school destination. Former students are invited to part-take in the school's Old Boys Association, which actively meet in reunions and committee hearings to discuss manners pertaining to the wider school community. To date, over 6000 boys have been educated by the college.

- Warren Boland – former Western Suburbs Magpies and Balmain Tigers rugby league player
- Lloyd Brodrick – Australian Ambassador to Poland
- Victor Dominello – former New South Wales state member for the electoral district of Ryde
- Philip Esler FRSE (HSC 1970) – lawyer, academic administrator and academic; tenured as the Portland Chair in New Testament Studies at the University of Gloucestershire
- Emmanuel Fakiye – represented Australia at the 2018 Commonwealth Games - Men's Triple Jump
- John Filan – former Blackburn Rovers, Wigan Athletic, Coventry City and Sydney FC football player and goalkeeping coach
- Dave Gilbert – former Australian cricketer and Cricket NSW CEO
- Richard Gill – former conductor, music educator, and advocate for the music education of children (1941–2018)
- Michael Lee – Australian Federal Court justice
- Jordan Lane – former City of Ryde Mayor and current Liberal member for the electoral district of Ryde
- Paul Newton – artist and Archibald Prize winner
- Tim Norton SVD – former Auxiliary Bishop of Brisbane, now Bishop of Broome
- Gavin Robertson – former Australian cricketer
- Peter Ryan OAM (HSC 1979, 1961–2025) – chief ABC business journalist and former Washington bureau
- Aziz Shavershian – former bodybuilder and Internet celebrity otherwise known as Zyzz (1989–2011)

== See also ==
- Catholic education in Australia
- List of Catholic schools in New South Wales
