= Foreign relations of Australia =

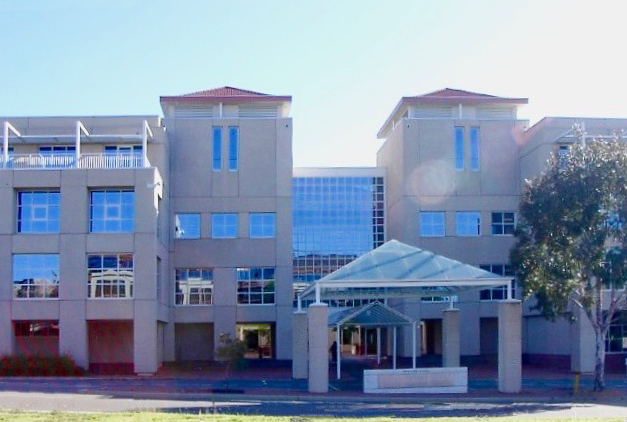
RG Casey House, Canberra, is the headquarters of the Department of Foreign Affairs and Trade.

Foreign relations of Australia are influenced by its position as a leading trading nation and as a significant donor of humanitarian aid. Australia's foreign policy is guided by a commitment to multilateralism and regionalism, as well as to build strong bilateral relations with its allies. Key concerns include free trade, terrorism, refugees, economic cooperation with Asia and stability in the Indo-Pacific. Australia is active in the United Nations and the Commonwealth of Nations. Given its history of starting and supporting important regional and global initiatives, it has been described as a regional middle power par excellence.

It maintains significant ties with ASEAN and has become steadfastly allied with New Zealand, through long-standing ties dating back to the 1800s. The country also has a longstanding alliance with the United States of America. Over recent decades Australia has sought to strengthen its relationship with Asian countries, with this becoming the focus of the country's network of diplomatic missions. In 2021, Australia signed a significant security partnership with the United Kingdom and the United States of America (AUKUS) aimed at upholding security in the Indo-Pacific region. In 2026 Australia signed a treaty with Papua New Guinea, which Anthony Albanese and James Marape described as "a mutual defense treaty that will enabled unprecedented integration of their defense forces and military personnel" and in response to Chinese diplomatic statements to the effect that the pact should not preclude relations with other states Marape stated that "This is not a treaty that sets up enemies but consolidates friendships and China — we’ve been transparent — we have told them that Australia … has become our security partner of choice and they understand." The Papua New Guinea-Australia Mutual Defense Treaty or Pukpuk treaty benefits both states allowing for deeper cooperation, joint training, interoperability and exchange of skills, and jungle warfare training.

== History ==
=== Post-Federation period ===
The Department of External Affairs was one of the inaugural departments created upon the federation of the Australian colonies in 1901, but largely remained an appendage of the Prime Minister's Department. Outside of the prime minister, the role of Australian High Commissioner to the United Kingdom (established in 1910) remained the most significant conduit for Australian foreign relations, with its significance emphasised by the fact that the first three appointees were former prime ministers. It has been suggested that, for Australia's early governments, foreign policy meant "relations with London on matters of imperial foreign policy on which Australia might have an interest".

Australia's first prime minister Edmund Barton was in favour of a uniform foreign policy for the British Empire, suggesting Australia could have no "foreign policy of its own" but expected that the British government would defer to the Australian perspective for "regional" imperial policy. Barton's successor Alfred Deakin also repeatedly lobbied the British government for greater consultation on imperial foreign policy and suggested the establishment of an imperial department of state to coordinate policy, as part of his broader support for an Imperial Federation. Deakin took some of the first steps towards diplomatic independence by dealing directly with the Japanese consul-general, for which he was reminded by the Colonial Office that it "expected Australia to conduct any dealings with a foreign power through London". He also dealt directly with the U.S. consul in Sydney to engineer the visit of the Great White Fleet in 1908. His actions "set a precedent for unilateralism" in foreign policy that was followed by his immediate successors as prime minister, although with a continued reliance on the British diplomatic service and policy-making apparatus and no efforts to develop Australian equivalents.

=== World War I and 1920s ===
World War I brought about an increase in direct Australian engagement with governments outside the British Empire, prompted by strategic concerns including the fate of German territories in the Pacific captured by Australian troops during the war. Prime Minister Billy Hughes visited the United States in 1918 and "in a series of meetings and speeches, called on the US to cooperate with Australia in ensuring postwar security in the Far East". At the 1919 Paris Peace Conference, Hughes led an Australian section within the British Empire delegation and co-signed the Treaty of Versailles on behalf of Australia, as with other British dominions. Hughes lobbied powerfully for Australian interests at the conference, including the granting of League of Nations mandates over the former German New Guinea and Nauru and opposition to Japan's Racial Equality Proposal to protect the White Australia policy.

The 1920s marked "the genesis of a distinct Australian foreign policy", largely in response to changing power dynamics and the decline in British influence in the Pacific following the Washington Naval Conference of 1922 influence. Australia continued to rely on "the UK and its imperial machinery for diplomatic representation and economic and material security". Following the 1923 Imperial Conference, attempts to formulate a uniform imperial foreign policy were largely abandoned in favour of a system of dominion ratification of British decisions. Governmental interest in foreign policy declined during the Great Depression as the Scullin government concentrated on internal economic matters. In 1929, internationalist Frederic Eggleston complained to a Senate committee that "no parliament which is responsible for its own foreign policy has less discussion on foreign affairs than does the Australian Parliament".

While yet to exchange formal diplomatic representatives, Australia made a number of "quasi-diplomatic" appointments in the post-war period, who functioned as official representatives of the Australian government but held no diplomatic rank. These included appointment of Henry Braddon to the United States in 1918 with the title of "commissioner" and the appointment of Clive Voss as "commercial agent" in France in 1919. In 1921, Australia appointed its first official representative in Asia, with the appointment of Edward S. Little as trade commissioner to China, based in Shanghai. Senator Thomas Bakhap undertook a trade mission to China in 1922 at the instigation of Hughes, and in the same year Egbert Sheaf was appointed as a trade commissioner to "the East", based in Singapore. The initial trade commissioner service was partially funded by state governments and ultimately failed due to a lack of support from Prime Minister Stanley Bruce and state premiers.

=== 1930s: appeasement and rearmament ===
The appointment of the Lyons government in 1932 marked a renewed interest in foreign policy, complemented by the establishment of foreign policy departments at universities and non-governmental advisory bodies like the Australian Institute of International Affairs. Prime Minister Joseph Lyons took a keen interest in foreign relations and exerted significant influence over the government's foreign policy. He authorised three "Pacific initiatives" as a sign of greater Australian interest in the Asia-Pacific. The first was the Australian Eastern Mission of 1934, led by deputy prime minister John Latham, which visited seven Asian countries and has been identified as a milestone in the early development of Australian foreign policy. The second initiative was the appointment in 1935 of Australian representatives in China, the Dutch East Indies, Japan, and United States – albeit below the rank of ambassador – where previously Australia's interests had been represented solely by British officials. The third was Lyons's "Pacific Pact" proposal, which envisioned a non-aggression pact between the major powers in the Pacific. Although he championed the pact at the 1937 Imperial Conference, discussions failed to progress. In Bird's opinion, "the Lyons years should thus be seen as a part of the evolution of Australian external policy from dependency towards autonomy […] it is perhaps the continuation and acceleration of the process of transition for which Lyons as Prime Minister ought to be best remembered".

=== World War II ===
The first accredited diplomat sent to a foreign country was Richard Casey, appointed as the first Minister to the United States in January 1940. This was followed shortly after by the arrival of the first Australian high commissioner to Canada, and by appointments of Ministers to Japan in 1940 and China in 1941. With the entry of Japan into the war in December 1941 and the failure of British forces at Singapore, there was a genuine fear of an imminent Japanese invasion. The only solution was to come under American protection. Ever since that time, United States has been the most important security ally. The close security relationship with the United States was formalized in 1951 by the Australia, New Zealand, United States Security (ANZUS) Treaty which remains the cornerstone of Australian security arrangements.

In parallel with the evolution of the British Empire to the Commonwealth of Nations, Australia progressively took responsibility for fully managing its foreign relations with other states. Australia concluded an agreement in 1944 with New Zealand dealing with the security, welfare, and advancement of the people of the dependent territories of the Pacific (the ANZAC pact). Australia was one of the founders of the United Nations (1945) and the South Pacific Commission (1947), and in 1950, it proposed the Colombo Plan to assist developing countries in Asia. After the war, Australia played a role in the Far Eastern Commission in Japan and supported Indonesian independence during that country's revolt against the Dutch (1945–49).

=== Cold War ===
As the Cold War deepened, Australia aligned itself fully with the Western Powers. In addition to contributing to UN forces in the Korean War – it was the first country to announce it would do so after the United States – Australia sent troops to assist in putting down the communist revolt in Malaya in 1948–60 and later to combat the Indonesian-supported invasion of Sarawak in 1963–65. Australia sent troops to repel communism and assist South Vietnamese and American forces in the Vietnam War, in a move that stirred up antiwar activism at home. Australia has been active in the Five Eyes intelligence alliance, and in the Australia – New Zealand – United Kingdom agreement and the Five Power Defence Arrangement—successive arrangements with Britain and New Zealand to ensure the security of Singapore and Malaysia.

=== Contemporary issues ===
After the end of the Cold War, Australia remained an important contributor to UN peacekeeping missions and to other multilateral security missions, often in alliance with the United States. Notably, it joined coalition forces in the Persian Gulf War in 1991, the War in Afghanistan (2001-2021), the Iraq War of 2003–2011 and the War in Iraq (2013-2017). In 1999 Australian peace keeping forces intervened in East Timor following its referendum to secede from Indonesia. In 2006 Australia sent a contingent of Australian troops to the state to assist in the 2006 East Timor crisis. Australia has also most recently led security assistance, peacekeeping and policing missions elsewhere in its neighbourhood, including in the Solomon Islands, Papua New Guinea and Tonga.

In the late 20th Century and early 21st Century, a new element in Australia's foreign relations was the growing relationship with the People's Republic of China. After the establishment of diplomatic relations in December 1972, Sino-Australian relations grew rapidly, to a point where China became Australia's main trading partner and extensive official and people-to-people links were well established. In the first 15 years of the 21st Century, Australia maintained privileged relations with both the United States and China. Since 2017, Sino-Australian relations have deteriorated dramatically, as a result of Australian criticism of policies and actions taken under General Secretary of the Chinese Communist Party Xi Jinping. This has strongly influenced recent Australian bilateral and multi-lateral engagements such as the Pacific Step-Up with Pacific Island states, the development of comprehensive strategic partnerships with a number of regional states, and the pursuit of alliances directed at countering Chinese predominance in the Indo-Pacific region. Since 2017, existing security arrangements have been augmented by a revived Quadrilateral Security Dialogue involving India, Japan and United States, the 2021 AUKUS security partnership with the United States and United Kingdom and the 2022 Australia-Japan Reciprocal Access Agreement, which provides for closer Australian-Japanese cooperation on defence and humanitarian operations.

== International agencies, treaties, and agreements ==
=== Membership of international organizations and groupings ===
One of the drafters of the UN Charter, Australia has given firm support to the United Nations system. Australia held the first Presidency of the Security Council in 1946 and provided the first military observers under UN auspices a year later, to Indonesia. It has been a member of the Security Council a further four times, in 1956–57, 1973–74, 1986–87 and 2013–14. It has been regularly elected a member of the Economic and Social Council most recently for 2020–22, a member of the United Nations Human Rights Council in 2018–20 and its predecessor the UN Commission on Human Rights in the 1990s. Australia takes a prominent part in many other UN activities, including peacekeeping, disarmament negotiations, and narcotics control. In September 1999, acting under a UN Security Council mandate, Australia led an international coalition to restore order in East Timor upon Indonesia's withdrawal from that territory. Australia has also been closely engaged in international development cooperation and humanitarian assistance through the Specialized agencies, Funds and Programmes and Regional Commissions of the United Nations and major International Financial Institutions, in particular the World Bank, the International Monetary Fund, the Asian Development Bank and the Asian Infrastructure Investment Bank.

Australia is a member of the G20, the Organisation for Economic Co-operation and Development (OECD), and the APEC forum. It is active in meetings of the Commonwealth Heads of Government, the Pacific Islands Forum and other Pacific Islands regional organizations and the Indian Ocean Rim Association. It has been a leader in the Cairns Group – countries pressing for agricultural trade reform in the Uruguay Round of the General Agreement on Tariffs and Trade (GATT) negotiations. Australia is also a member of MIKTA, an informal and diverse middle power partnership between Mexico, Indonesia, South Korea, Turkey and Australia, led by its foreign ministers, which seeks to promote an effective, rules-based global order.

Australia has devoted particular attention in the early 21st century to promoting regional architecture centred around the countries of the Association of Southeast Asian Nations (ASEAN), to support dialogue on political, security and economic challenges in the Indo-Pacific region. Australia is an active participant in the ASEAN Regional Forum (ARF), and the ASEAN sponsored East Asia Summit. Australia's place at the 2005 inaugural summit was only secured after it agreed to reverse its policy and accede to ASEAN's Treaty of Amity and Cooperation in Southeast Asia. Australia had been reluctant to sign the treaty out of concerns regarding how it would affect Australia's obligation under other treaty arrangements including ANZUS.

=== Security groupings ===
| Instrument | Countries |
|---|---|
| ANZUS | Australia • New Zealand (partially suspended) • United States |
| AUKUS | Australia • United Kingdom • United States |
| Five Power Defence Arrangements | Australia • New Zealand • Singapore • Malaysia • United Kingdom |
| Quadrilateral Security Dialogue | Australia • India • Japan • United States |

=== Special strategic partnership ===
- Japan (as of 2014). Under this partnership, Australia and Japan have established a strong and broad-ranging security relationship under the renewed 2022 Australia-Japan Joint Declaration on Security Cooperation.

=== Comprehensive strategic partnerships ===
Comprehensive strategic partnerships are broad, high level relationships which have increasingly been formalized in the Asia-Pacific region under this description since the early 21st century. They are arrangements which, in general, convey a sense of mutual value, strategic alignment and positive intent to further strengthen ties. They establish the framework for an intensified level of engagement across governments and indicate particularly close bilateral relations. Australia has a formal comprehensive strategic partnership with the following countries and multi-national organizations:

- Philippines (as of 2015)
- Singapore (as of 2016) (Enhanced CSP 2.0 as of 2025)
- Indonesia (as of 2018)
- India (as of 2020)
- Papua New Guinea (as of 2020)
- Malaysia (as of 2021)
- South Korea (as of 2021)
- ASEAN (as of 2021)
- Vietnam (as of 2024)

In 2014, the Australian prime minister and Chinese president agreed to describe the relationship as a "comprehensive strategic partnership", and this helped facilitate an extensive program of engagement. This partnership went into dormancy, particularly from 2020, but is being gradually revived with the improvement of relations since 2023.

=== Formal Defence Allies ===
| Country | Signed | Treaty |
|---|---|---|
| New Zealand | 1 September 1951 | ANZUS |
| United States | 1 September 1951 | ANZUS |
| Papua New Guinea | 6 October 2025 | Pukpuk Treaty |
| Fiji | 6 July 2026 | Veitacini Treaty |

== Trade ==
Australia Free trade agreements in force

Overall Australia's largest trading partners are the United States, South Korea, Japan, China, and the United Kingdom. Australia currently has bilateral Free Trade Agreements with New Zealand, the United States, Thailand and Singapore as of 2007 and the United Kingdom as of 2021. As well as this, Australia is in the process undertaking studies on Free Trade Agreements with ASEAN, China, Chile, India, Indonesia, and Malaysia.

- Australia–Chile Free Trade Agreement
- Australia–China Free Trade Agreement
- Australia–Korea Free Trade Agreement
- Australia–New Zealand Closer Economic Relations Trade Agreement
- Australia–United States Free Trade Agreement
- Australia–United Kingdom Free Trade Agreement
- Australia–Fiji Free Trade Agreement

=== Armaments ===
To bolster its foreign policy, Australia maintains a very well-equipped military. According to SIPRI, Australia is the eighth largest importer of major weapons in the world. The US supplied 80 per cent of Australia's imports and Spain 15 per cent. All armed services have received new major arms in 2014–18, but mainly aircraft and ships. The F-35 combat aircraft and antisubmarine warfare aircraft from the USA made up 53 per cent of Australian arms imports in 2014–18, while ships from Spain accounted for 29 per cent.

Australia is modernising its armed forces but also acquiring weapons that significantly increase its long-range capabilities. Among the weapons imported in 2010–14 were 5 tanker aircraft and the first of 2 amphibious assault ships from Spain, along with 2 large transport aircraft and 4 airborne early warning (AEW) aircraft from the USA. Australia also received 26 combat aircraft from the US, with 82 more on order (see box 3), as well as 8 anti-submarine warfare aircraft from the US and 3 Hobart destroyers from Spain.

In 2021, after Australia ended its 20-year military mission in Afghanistan, the defence officials held formal talks on strengthening military ties with the United Arab Emirates. However, the human rights groups said that it was "very concerning" to witness, as the Emirates was accused of carrying out "unlawful attacks" in war-torn nations like Libya and Yemen.

In contrast to 2014–18, the period from 2019 to 2023 saw a 21 per cent decline in Australia's major arms imports. However, in December 2021, Australia signed a defence procurement deal with South Korea worth $1billion AUD (US$720 million) for modern artillery, supply trucks and radars supplied by South Korean defense company Hanwha. The South Korean president Moon Jae-in and Australian prime minister Scott Morrison met for the signing of the agreement and additionally announced they were formally upgrading the Australian-South Korean relationship to a "comprehensive strategic partnership". Moreover, in 2023 Australia reached an agreement with the UK and the USA to import at least six nuclear-powered submarines.

== International aid ==
According to the Australian think tank Lowy Institute, Australia is the Pacific region's largest development partner, disbursing A$17 billion worth of international aid between 2008 and 2021, accounting for 40% of the region's overseas development finance (ODF). Australian international aid in the Pacific exceeded other regional partners including the Asian Development Bank, China, New Zealand and Japan. Between 2019 and 2021, Australian's overseas development finance in the Pacific rose from A$1.34 billion in 2019 to A$1.89 billion in 2021.

In May 2024, RNZ reported that the Albanese Government had slightly increased Australia's foreign aid budget by four percent, bringing its total 2024–2025 aid o A$4.961 billion budget. In August 2023, the Government had released its new international development strategy, which promised new country, gender, disability and humanitarian aid strategies.

In January 2026, Australia has committed an additional $50 million in humanitarian aid to Afghanistan, bringing the total aid since 2021 to $310 million. This support aims to address the worsening crisis exacerbated by Taliban rule, particularly focusing on food security, health services, and aid for women and children.

== Diplomatic relations ==
As of 2011, Australia had established formal diplomatic relations with all members of the United Nations as well as the Holy See, Kosovo, Cook Islands and (in 2014) Niue. In many cases, diplomatic relations are maintained on a non-resident basis, with the Australian ambassador or high commissioner based in another country. Since 2012, diplomatic relations have been effectively suspended with the Syrian Arab Republic, with no diplomatic accreditation by either country maintained, but consular relations continue. In the case of Afghanistan, following the Taliban takeover in 2021, diplomatic relations are in an ambiguous status with Australia "temporarily" closing its embassy in Kabul and not recognizing the Islamic Emirate government but maintaining the credentials of the embassy of the Islamic Republic of Afghanistan in Canberra. A number of Canadian missions provide consular assistance to Australians in countries in Africa where Australia does not maintain an office (and Australia reciprocates this arrangement for Canada in some other countries) through the Canada-Australia Consular Services Sharing Agreement.

Due to the One China Policy of the People's Republic of China, the Australian Office in Taiwan (formerly the Australian Commerce and Industry Office) unofficially represents Australia's interest in Taiwan, serving a function similar to other Australian Consulates.

=== List ===
List of countries which Australia maintains diplomatic relations with:

| # | Country | Date |
|---|---|---|
| 1 | United Kingdom | 22 January 1910 |
| 2 | Canada | 2 November 1939 |
| 3 | United States | 8 January 1940 |
| 4 | Japan | 17 August 1940 |
| 5 | Netherlands | 1 February 1942 |
| 6 | Russia | 10 October 1942 |
| 7 | New Zealand | 27 February 1943 |
| 8 | India | 1 November 1943 |
| 9 | France | 4 November 1944 |
| 10 | Brazil | 7 June 1945 |
| 11 | Chile | 27 December 1945 |
| 12 | Philippines | 4 July 1946 |
| 13 | South Africa | August 1946 |
| 14 | Ireland | 15 October 1946 |
| 15 | Denmark | 18 March 1947 |
| 16 | Sri Lanka | 29 April 1947 |
| 17 | Norway | 23 June 1947 |
| 18 | Pakistan | 15 August 1947 |
| 19 | Sweden | 24 September 1947 |
| 20 | Belgium | 30 January 1948 |
| 21 | Uruguay | 15 December 1948 |
| 22 | Israel | 29 January 1949 |
| 23 | Finland | 31 May 1949 |
| 24 | Italy | 24 November 1949 |
| 25 | Indonesia | 27 December 1949 |
| 26 | Egypt | 23 July 1950 |
| 27 | Cambodia | 15 January 1952 |
| 28 | Laos | 16 January 1952 |
| 29 | Germany | 28 January 1952 |
| 30 | Austria | 3 December 1952 |
| 31 | Thailand | 19 December 1952 |
| 32 | Greece | 30 March 1953 |
| 33 | Myanmar | 1 August 1953 |
| 34 | Malaysia | 31 August 1957 |
| 35 | Ghana | 21 February 1958 |
| 36 | Argentina | 10 December 1959 |
| 37 | Nepal | 15 February 1960 |
| 38 | Portugal | 4 August 1960 |
| 39 | Nigeria | 1 October 1960 |
| 40 | Switzerland | 5 September 1961 |
| 41 | South Korea | 30 October 1961 |
| 42 | Tanzania | 12 May 1962 |
| 43 | Peru | 1 March 1963 |
| 44 | Malta | 21 September 1964 |
| 45 | Singapore | 18 August 1965 |
| 46 | Kenya | 23 August 1965 |
| 47 | Uganda | 23 August 1965 |
| 48 | Ethiopia | 13 December 1965 |
| 49 | Mexico | 14 March 1966 |
| 50 | Serbia | 25 April 1966 |
| 51 | Lebanon | 5 February 1967 |
| 52 | Turkey | 28 February 1967 |
| 53 | Spain | 26 October 1967 |
| 54 | Romania | 18 March 1968 |
| 55 | Iran | 21 September 1968 |
| 56 | Afghanistan | 30 March 1969 |
| 57 | Luxembourg | 18 September 1970 |
| 58 | Mauritius | 25 September 1970 |
| 59 | Fiji | 10 October 1970 |
| 60 | Tonga | 3 December 1970 |
| 61 | Samoa | 31 March 1971 |
| 62 | Bangladesh | 31 January 1972 |
| 63 | Poland | 20 February 1972 |
| 64 | Bulgaria | 5 April 1972 |
| 65 | Hungary | 6 April 1972 |
| 66 | Bahrain | 24 April 1972 |
| 67 | Zambia | 18 May 1972 |
| 68 | Czech Republic | 18 June 1972 |
| 69 | Mongolia | 15 September 1972 |
| 70 | China | 21 December 1972 |
| 71 | Vietnam | 26 February 1973 |
| — | Holy See | 24 March 1973 |
| 72 | Venezuela | 31 March 1973 |
| 73 | Botswana | 9 July 1973 |
| 74 | Eswatini | 9 July 1973 |
| 75 | Lesotho | 9 July 1973 |
| 76 | Iraq | 2 December 1973 |
| 77 | Oman | 18 December 1973 |
| 78 | Bahamas | 7 January 1974 |
| 79 | Barbados | 7 January 1974 |
| 80 | Guatemala | 7 January 1974 |
| 81 | Guyana | 7 January 1974 |
| 82 | Jamaica | 7 January 1974 |
| 83 | Trinidad and Tobago | 7 January 1974 |
| 84 | Saudi Arabia | 15 January 1974 |
| 85 | Maldives | 25 January 1974 |
| 86 | Sudan | 8 February 1974 |
| 87 | Senegal | 10 February 1974 |
| 88 | Panama | 20 February 1974 |
| 89 | Cyprus | 29 April 1974 |
| 90 | Kuwait | 1 July 1974 |
| 91 | Algeria | 8 July 1974 |
| 92 | Madagascar | 22 August 1974 |
| 93 | Ivory Coast | 17 September 1974 |
| 94 | Costa Rica | 9 October 1974 |
| 95 | Paraguay | 2 December 1974 |
| 96 | North Korea | 31 December 1974 |
| 97 | Colombia | 9 January 1975 |
| 98 | Ecuador | 3 February 1975 |
| 99 | United Arab Emirates | 10 March 1975 |
| 100 | Bolivia | 10 April 1975 |
| 101 | Jordan | 29 April 1975 |
| 102 | Syria | 12 May 1975 |
| 103 | Papua New Guinea | 16 September 1975 |
| 104 | Seychelles | 29 June 1976 |
| 105 | Morocco | 13 July 1976 |
| 106 | Nauru | 24 October 1976 |
| 107 | Tunisia | 17 February 1977 |
| 108 | Tuvalu | 30 November 1977 |
| 109 | Libya | 4 January 1978 |
| 110 | Solomon Islands | 7 July 1978 |
| 111 | Kiribati | 12 July 1979 |
| 112 | Grenada | 18 December 1979 |
| 113 | Zimbabwe | 18 April 1980 |
| 114 | Qatar | 1 May 1980 |
| 115 | Vanuatu | 30 July 1980 |
| 116 | Yemen | 20 December 1980 |
| 117 | Gambia | 10 July 1981 |
| 118 | Sierra Leone | 10 July 1981 |
| 119 | Antigua and Barbuda | 17 January 1982 |
| 120 | Belize | 17 January 1982 |
| 121 | Dominica | 17 January 1982 |
| 122 | Saint Lucia | 17 January 1982 |
| 123 | Mozambique | 1 April 1982 |
| 124 | Malawi | 1 July 1983 |
| 125 | Comoros | 27 July 1983 |
| 126 | Gabon | 19 September 1983 |
| 127 | El Salvador | 4 December 1983 |
| 128 | Honduras | 4 December 1983 |
| 129 | Nicaragua | 4 December 1983 |
| 130 | Brunei | 1 January 1984 |
| 131 | Iceland | 12 February 1984 |
| 132 | Mali | 15 March 1984 |
| 133 | Albania | 16 September 1984 |
| 134 | Saint Vincent and the Grenadines | 31 January 1986 |
| 135 | Saint Kitts and Nevis | 9 February 1986 |
| 136 | Marshall Islands | 8 July 1987 |
| 137 | Angola | 30 March 1988 |
| 138 | Federated States of Micronesia | 6 July 1988 |
| 139 | Cuba | 31 January 1989 |
| 140 | Latvia | 27 August 1991 |
| 141 | Lithuania | 6 November 1991 |
| 142 | Estonia | 21 November 1991 |
| 143 | Kyrgyzstan | 26 December 1991 |
| 144 | Tajikistan | 26 December 1991 |
| 145 | Uzbekistan | 26 December 1991 |
| 146 | Belarus | 9 January 1992 |
| 147 | Ukraine | 10 January 1992 |
| 148 | Armenia | 15 January 1992 |
| 149 | Slovenia | 5 February 1992 |
| 150 | Croatia | 13 February 1992 |
| 151 | Moldova | 1 April 1992 |
| 152 | Turkmenistan | 14 May 1992 |
| 153 | Azerbaijan | 19 June 1992 |
| 154 | Kazakhstan | 22 June 1992 |
| 155 | Georgia | 16 July 1992 |
| 156 | Slovakia | 1 January 1993 |
| 157 | Bosnia and Herzegovina | 7 January 1993 |
| 158 | Eritrea | 24 November 1993 |
| 159 | Namibia | 8 June 1994 |
| 160 | Palau | 1 October 1994 |
| — | Cook Islands | 1994 |
| 161 | Andorra | 2 March 1995 |
| 162 | San Marino | 13 September 1995 |
| 163 | North Macedonia | 20 October 1995 |
| 164 | Suriname | 19 January 1996 |
| 165 | Liechtenstein | 14 March 1997 |
| 166 | Dominican Republic | 22 April 1997 |
| 167 | Haiti | 28 November 2000 |
| 168 | Mauritania | 13 December 2001 |
| 169 | Cameroon | 2 March 2002 |
| 170 | Timor-Leste | 20 May 2002 |
| 171 | Bhutan | 14 September 2002 |
| 172 | Guinea | 17 June 2004 |
| 173 | Benin | 28 April 2005 |
| 174 | Chad | 19 December 2005 |
| 175 | Montenegro | 1 September 2006 |
| 176 | Monaco | 3 May 2007 |
| 177 | Rwanda | 9 May 2007 |
| 178 | Burundi | 23 August 2007 |
| — | Kosovo | 21 May 2008 |
| 179 | Liberia | 26 September 2008 |
| 180 | Burkina Faso | 13 November 2008 |
| 181 | Djibouti | 23 April 2009 |
| 182 | Republic of the Congo | 7 May 2009 |
| 183 | Niger | 7 May 2009 |
| 184 | São Tomé and Príncipe | 8 July 2009 |
| 185 | Togo | 22 July 2009 |
| 186 | Equatorial Guinea | 23 July 2009 |
| 187 | Cape Verde | 22 September 2009 |
| 188 | Central African Republic | 18 January 2010 |
| 189 | Somalia | 20 April 2010 |
| 190 | Democratic Republic of the Congo | 18 January 2011 |
| 191 | Guinea-Bissau | 14 March 2011 |
| 192 | South Sudan | 24 September 2011 |
| — | Niue | 27 February 2014 |

== Bilateral relations ==
=== Africa ===
| Country | Formal relations began | Notes |
|---|---|---|
| Algeria | 8 July 1974 | Australia and Algeria enjoy friendly relations and cooperate in international fora on areas of mutual interest.; Algeria has an embassy in Canberra.; Australia is accredited to Algeria from its embassy in Paris, France.; An Australian resident embassy was established in Algiers in 1975 and was closed in 1991 for budgetary reasons. For a history of Australian representation to Algeria see List of ambassadors of Australia to Algeria.; Bilateral goods and services trade in 2020 was valued at approximately A$165 million, mostly Australian imports of crude petroleum. |
| Angola | 30 May 1988 | Australia and Angola established diplomatic relations in May 1988 with the accreditation by Australia of an ambassador resident in Lusaka, Zambia. Accreditation soon switched to the high commissioner in Pretoria, South Africa.; Australia also has an honorary consulate in Luanda.; Angola has an embassy in Canberra, opened in December 2024.; The trade and investment relationship between the two countries is limited, with two way merchandise trade being just over A$5.6m in 2019–20. |
| Benin | 11 September 2010 | Australia's ambassador is accredited from Abuja, Nigeria.; Benin's ambassador is accredited from Tokyo, Japan. |
| Botswana | 9 July 1973 | Australia and Botswana have enjoyed good relations since Botswana's independence, as members of the Commonwealth of Nations. The two countries formally established diplomatic relations in July 1973 with the non-resident accreditation of an Australian high commissioner based in Pretoria.; Australia also has an honorary consulate in Gaborone.; Botswana has a high commission in Canberra and has honorary consulates in Brisbane, Melbourne, Perth, and the New South Wales mid-north coast town of Kendall; Governor General Quentin Bryce made the first official visit of an Australian governor-general to Botswana in March 2009. President Ian Khama made the first official visit of a Botswanan president to Australia in March 2010. |
| Burkina Faso | 13 November 2008 | Australia and Burkina Faso established diplomatic relations in 2008 as part of a broadening of Australia's engagement with Africa under the Governments of Kevin Rudd and Julia Gillard.; Australia's ambassador is accredited from Accra, Ghana.; Burkina Faso's ambassador is accredited from Tokyo, Japan. |
| Burundi | | Australia's ambassador to Burundi is accredited from Nairobi, Kenya.; Burundi's ambassador is accredited from Beijing, China, the first presenting credentials in February 2026. It also has an honorary consulate in Perth. |
| Cape Verde | 22 September 2009 | Australia and Cape Verde established diplomatic relations in 2009 as part of a broadening of Australia's engagement with Africa under the Governments of Kevin Rudd and Julia Gillard.; Australia is accredited to Cape Verde from its embassy in Lisbon, Portugal.; Cape Verde has not yet established diplomatic representation to Australia. |
| Cameroon | 2 March 2002 | Australia and Cameroon enjoy good relations as members of the Commonwealth of Nations. The two countries formally established diplomatic relations in March 2002 with the non-resident accreditation of an Australian high commissioner based in Abuja, Nigeria.; Australia also maintains an honorary consulate in Yaoundé.; The Cameroonian high commissioner is accredited from Tokyo, Japan.; Cameroon also maintains an honorary consulate in Sydney.; The two countries have modest trade links. In 2019–2020 total merchandise trade was A$1.3 million. |
| Central African Republic | 18 January 2010 | Australia and the Central African Republic established diplomatic relations in 2010 as part of a broadening of Australia's engagement with Africa under the Governments of Kevin Rudd and Julia Gillard.; Australia is accredited to the Central African Republic from its embassy in Addis Ababa, Ethiopia.; The Central African Republic has not yet established diplomatic representation to Australia. |
| Chad | 2007 | Diplomatic relations were formalized in 2007 with the accreditation of the first Australian ambassador, resident in Abuja, Nigeria.; Australia is currently accredited to Chad from its embassy in Paris, France.; Chad initially accredited its ambassador resident in Beijing, China but does not currently have an accreditation to Australia. |
| Comoros | 27 July 1983 | Australia and Comoros established diplomatic relations in July 1983 with the presentation of credentials of Australia's first ambassador. The two countries cooperate as members of the Indian Ocean Rim Association and through small development cooperation projects.; Australia's ambassador to Comoros is accredited from Port Louis, Mauritius.; Comoros has not yet established diplomatic representation to Australia. |
| Congo | 7 May 2009 | Australia and Congo established diplomatic relations in 2009 as part of a broadening of Australia's engagement with Africa under the Governments of Kevin Rudd and Julia Gillard.; The Australian ambassador is accredited from Harare, Zimbabwe.; Congo has not yet established diplomatic representation to Australia. |
| Democratic Republic of the Congo | 2011 | Australia and the DRC established diplomatic relations in 2011 as part of a broadening of Australia's engagement with Africa under the Governments of Kevin Rudd and Julia Gillard.; The Australian ambassador is accredited from Harare, Zimbabwe.; The DRC has not yet established diplomatic representation to Australia.; Immigration from the DRC to Australia has occurred mainly since the early 2000s. At the end of June 2019, 7,210 people born in the DRC were living in Australia.; Trade between the two countries is small. In 2019–2020 total merchandise trade was only A$3.4 million. |
| Djibouti | | Australia is accredited to Djibouti from its embassy in Addis Ababa, Ethiopia.; Djibouti is accredited to Australia from its embassy in Tokyo, Japan. |
| Egypt | 8 April 1950, severed diplomatic relations from 6 November 1956 to 19 October 1959 | See Australia–Egypt relations: Egypt was the first Arab country with which Australia established diplomatic relations, with the opening of an Australian legation in Cairo in 1950.; Following President Gamal Abdel Nasser's nationalization of the Suez Canal in July 1956, Australian prime minister Robert Menzies lead a five-nation delegation to Cairo in August 1956 to negotiate with Nasser about the return of the Canal to international control. The Suez Canal was the preeminent economic trade route for Australia at that time. Diplomatic relations were broken by Egypt in November 1956 in protest over subsequent Australian support for the Anglo-French invasion during the Suez Crisis. Relations were restored in 1959 and raised to embassy-level in 1961. For a detailed history of Australian representation in Egypt see List of ambassadors of Australia to Egypt.; Egypt has an embassy in Canberra and two consulates-general (in Melbourne and Sydney).; There is a significant community in Australia of Egyptian-born immigrants and their descendants, resulting in significant people-to-people ties between the two countries. Immigration from Egypt became significant after the Second World War, including by a large number of Coptic Christians. The 2016 Australian census recorded almost 40,000 Egyptian-born residents. (See also Egyptian Australians); Australia supported the 1979 Egypt-Israel peace treaty and has provided deployments of military personnel to the Multinational Force and Observers in the Sinai since 1982. Australia engages with Egypt on a number of shared regional and international priorities, including counter-terrorism and countering violent extremism.; in 2016–17 two-way merchandise trade totalled A$582 million (A$533 million in exports from Australia and A$49 million in imports from Egypt). Australia's principal exports to Egypt are agricultural products including vegetables, wool and wheat. Australian companies are prominent investors in Egypt's mining sector.; Governor-general Peter Cosgrove visited Egypt in October 2017 to attend commemorations for the 75th anniversary of the Battle of El Alamein and make an official visit that included a meeting with President Abdel Fattah el-Sisi. This was followed by the visit of Governor General Sam Mostyn to mark the 75th anniversary of diplomatic relations. Coptic Orthodox Pope Tawadros II visited Australia in September 2017. |
| Equatorial Guinea | 23 July 2009 | Australia and Equatorial Guinea established diplomatic relations in 2009 as part of a broadening of Australia's engagement with Africa under the Governments of Kevin Rudd and Julia Gillard.; Australia's ambassador is accredited from Madrid, Spain.; Equatorial Guinea's ambassador is accredited from Beijing, China. |
| Eritrea | 24 November 1993 | Both countries established diplomatic relations on 24 November 1993 when first Eritrea's Ambassador to Australia Mr. Fessehaie Abraham presented his credentials: Australia is accredited to Eritrea from its embassy in Cairo, Egypt.; Eritrea is accredited to Australia from its embassy in Beijing, China and has a consulate-general in Melbourne.; A small but influential Eritrean refugee community in Australia since the 1970s promoted a sympathetic view of Eritrean independence and in 1989 Australia hosted a quasi-official visit of Eritrean rebel leader Issaias Afewerki. The Australian NGO Fred Hollows Foundation has been active in Eritrea since the 1980s in supporting the elimination of trachoma and established Africa's only factory making intra-ocular lenses required for cataract operations.; Australia established diplomatic relations with Eritrea following its internationally recognised independence in 1993 and implemented a significant aid program. Eritrea opened an embassy in Canberra that year, which remained open until 2013.; Political repression in Eritrea, human rights violations and war with neighbouring Ethiopia led to a chill in political relations and Australia has applied Eritrea-related UN sanctions.; The 2016 Australian census recorded 4,303 Eritrean-born residents, mostly living in Melbourne. |
| Eswatini | 9 July 1973 | Australia and Eswatini have enjoyed good relations since Eswatini's independence, as members of the Commonwealth of Nations. The two countries formally established diplomatic relations in July 1973 with the non-resident accreditation of an Australian high commissioner based in Pretoria, South Africa.; Eswatini is accredited to Australia from its High Commission in Kuala Lumpur, Malaysia. |
| Ethiopia | 13 December 1965 | Ethiopia and Australia have enjoyed diplomatic relations since 1965 with an Australian ambassador accredited on a non-resident basis from Nairobi, Kenya. In 1984 an Australian embassy was opened in Addis Ababa. It was closed in 1987 due to budget cuts and accreditation returned to the High Commission in Nairobi. In September 2010, a resident Ambassador was reappointed and since then Australia has continued to maintain an embassy in Addis Ababa, with concurrent accreditation to the African Union. For a detailed history of Australian representation in Ethiopia see List of ambassadors of Australia to Ethiopia.; Ethiopia opened an embassy in Canberra in December 2013. Prior to this Ethiopia's ambassador was accredited from Tokyo.; Emperor Haile Selassie I paid a 5-day state visit to Australia in May 1968. This was commemorated, ahead of its 50th anniversary, in a 2017 visit by the president of the Crown Council of Ethiopia Prince Ermias Sahle Selassie, the Emperor's grandson.; Australian governor-general Quentin Bryce made a state visit to Ethiopia in March 2009.; A Memorandum of Understanding on Development Cooperation and a Bilateral Cooperation Agreement were signed by the two countries in May 2012 and January 2013 respectively.; Australia has a small but growing Ethiopian-born community, primarily in Melbourne, Victoria. The 2016 Australian census recorded 11,792 Ethiopia-born people of diverse ethnic and linguistic heritage. See also Ethiopian Australians.; Merchandise trade between Australia and Ethiopia is small, valued at A$31 million in 2019–2020 and mainly comprising Australian imports of coffee. |
| Gabon | 20 October 1984 | Both countries established diplomatic relations on 20 October 1984 when Mr. A. R.Taylor, presented his letter of credence as non-resident Ambassador of Australia to Gabon.: At the time Gabon joined the Commonwealth of Nations in 2022, Australia's accredited representative was redesignated high commissioner.; Gabon has not yet accredited a representative to Australia.; Two way merchandise trade between the two countries was almost A$120 million in 2019–2020. A significant part of that trade is Australian imports of crude petroleum and Gabonese imports of aircraft.; President Ali Bongo Ondimba made a state visit to Australia in 2012. His father, President Omar Bongo, had earlier been officially welcomed to Australia during a largely private visit in 1978. |
| Gambia | 15 February 1982 | Australia and The Gambia have enjoyed good relations as members of the Commonwealth of Nations. Diplomatic relations were established upon the presentation of credentials in February 1982 of Australia's first high commissioner, then resident in Accra, Ghana.; Australia is currently accredited to The Gambia from its high commission in Abuja, Nigeria.; The Gambia is accredited to Australia from its embassy in Riyadh, Saudi Arabia. |
| Ghana | 6 December 1957 | Australia has a high commission in Accra. For a detailed history of Australian representation in Ghana see List of high commissioners of Australia to Ghana.; Ghana has a high commission in Canberra and a consulate-general in Sydney.; Australia's trade relations are modest, valued at A$113 million in 2007, most of that exports to Ghana. Australian mining investment in Ghana has grown in recent years, primarily in the gold mining sector.; Australia also provides foreign aid to Ghana to alleviate poverty, improve the environment and promote human rights. |
| Guinea | | Australia and Guinea share close interests in the mining sector. They are the two largest bauxite producers in the world (see List of countries by bauxite production) and were founding signatories in the 1970s of the (now defunct) International Bauxite Agreement. Australian companies are involved in developing the Guinean mining sector.; Australia is accredited to Guinea from its high commission in Accra, Ghana.; Guinea is accredited to Australia from its embassy in Tokyo, Japan. |
| Guinea-Bissau | | Australia granted de jure recognition to Guinea-Bissau on 11 August 1974, having extended de facto recognition in June 1974 in support of its independence campaign.; Australia and Guinea-Bissau established diplomatic relations in March 2011 as part of a broadening of Australia's engagement with Africa under the Governments of Kevin Rudd and Julia Gillard.; Australia's ambassador is accredited from Lisbon, Portugal.; Guinea-Bissau has not yet established representation to Australia. |
| Ivory Coast | 17 September 1974 | Australia and Côte d'Ivoire established diplomatic relations with the accreditation in September 1974 of an Australian ambassador resident in Accra, Ghana.; Côte d'Ivoire opened an embassy in Canberra in 2016 but this was closed in 2021.; Two way merchandise trade between the countries was A$123 million in 2019–2020. |
| Kenya | 23 August 1965 | See Australia–Kenya relations: Australia's relations with Kenya are based on Kenya's key role and position in East Africa and its importance in multilateral bodies such as the United Nations, the Commonwealth and the World Trade Organization.; Australia has a high commission in Nairobi, opened in September 1965. For a detailed history of Australian representation in Kenya see List of high commissioners of Australia to Kenya.; Kenya has a high commission in Canberra, opened in 1983.; Australian governor-general Quentin Bryce made a state visit to Kenya in March 2009 to promote bilateral relations.; There is a small but growing Kenya-born community in Australia. The latest Australian Census in 2016 recorded 17,652 Kenya-born people in Australia.; Trade has been growing between the two countries, with two-way merchandise trade reaching $115 million in 2018–19. Wheat and minerals are Australia's main exports to Kenya, while coffee and vegetables make up the bulk of imports.; Australia has provided development assistance to Kenya since the late 20th Century. |
| Lesotho | 9 July 1973 | Australia and Lesotho have enjoyed good relations since Lesotho's independence, as members of the Commonwealth of Nations. The two countries formally established diplomatic relations in July 1973 with the non-resident accreditation of an Australian high commissioner based in Pretoria, South Africa.; Lesotho is accredited to Australia from its High Commission in Kuala Lumpur. It also has an honorary consulate-general in Newcastle. |
| Liberia | 26 September 2008 | Australia and Liberia established diplomatic relations in 2008 as part of a broadening of Australia's engagement with Africa under the Governments of Kevin Rudd and Julia Gillard, with Australia's high commissioner in Accra, Ghana becoming Australia's first Ambassador to Liberia in February 2009.; Liberia has not yet established representation to Australia. |
| Libya | 2 January 1978, broke off 19 May 1987, Restored in June 2002 | See Australia–Libya relations: Australia and Libya announced the establishment of diplomatic relations on 4 January 1978. A Libyan People's Bureau was opened in Canberra and the Australian ambassador to Italy was accredited on a non-resident basis. Concerns about Libyan destabilising activities in the Pacific region, part of a broader sponsorship by Muammar Gaddafi of such activities around the world, led to the expulsion of the bureau in Canberra in 1987.; As part of the thawing of relations between Libya and Western nations following Gaddafi's post 9-11 policy u-turns, diplomatic relations were restored in 2002, the Libyan People's Bureau reopened in Canberra and the Australian ambassador in Rome resumed non-resident accreditation. This has remained the case, though with the bureau's name reverting to embassy following the overthrow of Gaddafi.; Australia was a major non-military backer of the revolutionaries during the Libyan Civil War, sending more humanitarian aid to Libya than any other single country after the United States. It was relatively early to recognise the NTC, doing so on 9 June 2011, months before the capture of Tripoli.; In December 2011, when then Australian Foreign Affairs Minister Kevin Rudd travelled to Libya to meet with Libyan Prime Minister Abdurrahim El-Keib. Rudd ceremonially hoisted the flag of Australia at his country's consulate-general in Tripoli and pledged Canberra's support for efforts to remove unexploded landmines in Libya, as well as advice on Libya's planned transition to democratic governance.; There is a small Libyan community in Australia, mainly in Victoria. The 2016 Australian census recorded 2,535 Libyan-born people.; The Libyan civil war that has followed Gaddafi's overthrow and the lack of a stable political settlement has constrained the development of trade and investment links between the countries. In 2019–20 total merchandise trade was valued at A$738 million, almost all being imports by Australia of Libyan crude petroleum. |
| Madagascar | 22 August 1974 | Australia and Madagascar have enjoyed friendly relations since Madagascar's independence in 1960. President Philibert Tsiranana was the first African head of state to make an official visit to Australia in November 1965.; Australia and Madagascar established diplomatic relations in 1974 with the accreditation of an Australian ambassador on a non-resident basis.; Australia is currently accredited to Madagascar from the high commission in Port Louis, Mauritius and maintains an honorary consulate in Antananarivo.; Madagascar is accredited to Australia from its embassy in Port Louis, Mauritius and maintains an honorary consulate-general in Sydney.; Two-way merchandise trade in 2019–2020 was valued at a modest A$40 million. |
| Malawi | 1 July 1983 | Both countries established diplomatic relations on 1 July 1983 when Mr. I. L. James, the first High Commissioner of Australia to Malawi presented his letters of credentials.: Australia and Malawi have enjoyed good relations as members of the Commonwealth of Nations.; Australia's high commissioner is accredited from Harare, Zimbabwe. Australia also has an honorary consulate in Lilongwe.; Malawi's high commissioner is accredited from Tokyo. Malawi also has an honorary consulate in Melbourne.; Australian companies have mining interests in Malawi, including the Kayelekera uranium project. |
| Mali | 15 March 1984 | Both countries established diplomatic relations on 15 March 1984 when first non-resident Ambassador of Mali to Australia Mr. Boubacar Toure presented his credentials: Australia is accredited to Mali from its high commission in Accra, Ghana.; Mali is accredited to Australia from its embassy in Tokyo, Japan. |
| Mauritania | 13 December 2001 | Both countries established diplomatic relations on 13 December 2001.: Australia's ambassador is accredited from Paris, France.; Mauritania's ambassador is accredited from Tokyo, Japan.; Australian companies are present in Mauritania's mining sector and two-way trade between the two countries is mainly mining-related, In 2019–2020 Australia imported about A$100m in iron ore, and exported about A$8 million, mainly in specialized civil engineering equipment. |
| Mauritius | 25 September 1970 | Australia and Mauritius have enjoyed good relations as members of the Commonwealth of Nations since Mauritius's independence. The two countries formally established diplomatic relations in 1970. There are strong economic, education and people-to-people links.; Australia has a high commission in Port Louis. For a detailed history of Australian representation in Mauritius see List of high commissioners of Australia to Mauritius.; Mauritius has a high commission in Canberra and four Honorary Consuls based in Brisbane, Sydney, Melbourne and Perth.; Australian governor-general Quentin Bryce made a state visit to Mauritius in March 2009 to promote bilateral relations. |
| Morocco | 13 July 1976 | See Australia–Morocco relations: Australia has had an embassy in Rabat, which opened in 2017. For a detailed history of Australian representation in Morocco see List of ambassadors of Australia to Morocco.; Morocco has an embassy in Canberra, which opened in 2005.; Two-way trade between Australia and Morocco was valued at over A$144 million in 2021, with the main imports from Morocco being chemicals and manufactured clothing, and the main Australian exports being meat, fruit and vegetables.; Australian Parliamentary Delegations have visited Morocco in 1993, 2011 and 2013.; Australia provided five contingents of signals staff to the UN peace-keeping mission in the Western Sahara (MINURSO) between September 1991 and May 1994.; Australia follows the UN position on Western Sahara as territory yet to be formally decolonized, and has neither recognised Moroccan sovereignty nor the Sahrawi Arab Democratic Republic. |
| Mozambique | 1 April 1982 | Diplomatic relations were established in April 1982 when the first Ambassador of Australia to Mozambique with residence in Harare presented his credentials to President Samora Machel. Since Mozambique was admitted to the Commonwealth of Nations, the two countries have exchanged High Commissioners.; Australia is currently accredited from its High Commission in Pretoria, South Africa. In addition, Australia has an honorary consulate in Maputo.; Mozambique is accredited from its embassy in Tokyo, Japan. Mozambique also has an honorary consulate in Melbourne.; Bilateral merchandise trade reached A$484 million in 2019–20, comprising mostly Australian aluminium exports.; Australian governor-general Quentin Bryce made a state visit to Mozambique in April 2009 to promote bilateral relations. This was reciprocated by the state visit of President Armando Guebuza in March 2013. |
| Namibia | 1990 | Australia was an active supporter for the peaceful decolonization of Namibia, becoming a member of the United Nations Council on Namibia in 1974 and contributing military engineers to the United Nations Transition Assistance Group in 1989–1990 (see Australian contribution to UNTAG).; Australia's high commissioner to Namibia is accredited from Pretoria and has an honorary consulate in Windhoek.; Namibia has an honorary consulate-general in Sydney.; Australian governor-general Quentin Bryce made a state visit to Namibia in March 2009 to promote bilateral relations. |
| Niger | 7 May 2009 | Australia and Niger established diplomatic relations in 2009 as part of a broadening of Australia's engagement with Africa under the Governments of Kevin Rudd and Julia Gillard.; Australia is accredited to Niger from Abuja, Nigeria. The first Australian ambassador presented credentials in Niamey on 25 January 2011.); Niger is accredited to Australia through its embassy in New Delhi, India.; President Issoufou Mahamadou made the first visit to Australia by a Nigerien president in October 2017, to promote bilateral relations in such areas as mining, energy and dryland agriculture and security and counter-terrorism cooperation. |
| Nigeria | 1 October 1960 | Australia and Nigeria enjoy good relations as members of the Commonwealth of Nations. Diplomatic relations were established upon Nigeria's independence in 1960 with the appointment of an Australian high commissioner based in the then capital of Lagos.; Periodic Nigeria-Australia Senior Officials Talks are held under a Memorandum of Understanding (MoU) between the Nigerian Ministry of Foreign Affairs and the Australian Department of Foreign Affairs and Trade signed in September 2012. The third such bilaterial discussions were held in Abuja in February 2020.; Australia has a high commission in Abuja and an honorary consulate in Lagos. For a detailed history of Australian representation in Nigeria see List of high commissioners of Australia to Nigeria.; Nigeria has a high commission in Canberra.; There is a small but growing Nigerian-born community in Australia. The 2016 Australian census recorded 8,488 Nigerian-born residents. Migration from Nigeria started with students in the 1960s and nowadays continues through skilled and family migration. See also Nigerian Australians.; Total merchandise trade between the countries in 2019–2020 was A$460 million, a significant element being Australian imports of crude petroleum. Nigeria-Australia Investment Fora, most recently held in Melbourne in 2020, have sought to promote an expansion of Australian investment. |
| Rwanda | 2007 | Australia and Rwanda enjoy good relations as members of the Commonwealth of Nations. Diplomatic relations were formalized in 2007.; Australia's high commissioner is accredited from Nairobi, Kenya.; Rwanda's high commissioner is accredited from Singapore. It also has an honorary consulate-general in Melbourne.; The two countries' trading relationship is modest. In 2019–2020 the two-way merchandise trade was A$1.6 million. Rwanda exports coffee and tea to Australia while it has also attracted Australian companies in mining, agro-inputs and technology to Rwanda. Additionally, a sizable number of Rwandans have benefited from Australian government scholarships to pursue graduate and post-graduate courses in Australia over the years.; In 1994–1995 Australia provided two small military medical contingents to support the post-genocide United Nations Assistance Mission to Rwanda (UNAMIR II). |
| São Tomé and Príncipe | 8 July 2009 | Australia and São Tomé and Príncipe established diplomatic relations in 2009 as part of a broadening of Australia's engagement with Africa under the Governments of Kevin Rudd and Julia Gillard.; Australia is accredited to São Tomé and Príncipe from its embassy in Lisbon, Portugal.; São Tomé and Príncipe is accredited to Australia through its embassy in Lisbon. |
| Senegal | 26 September 1974 | See Australia–Senegal relations: Australia and Senegal established diplomatic relations with the accreditation in September 1974 of an Australian ambassador resident in Accra, Ghana.; Senegal's ambassador to Australia is accredited from Tokyo, Japan. It maintains an honorary consulate-general in Melbourne.; Two way merchandise trade between the countries was A$110 million in 2019–2020. |
| Seychelles | 29 June 1976 | Australia and Seychelles have enjoyed good relations, as members of the Commonwealth of Nations and the Indian Ocean Rim Association, dating back prior to Seychelles' independence. Then Prime Minister James Mancham made an official visit to Australia in April 1976. Diplomatic relations were established on 29 June 1976, Seychelles' independence day.; Australia's high commissioner to Seychelles is resident in Port Louis, Mauritius.; Seychelles' high commissioner to Australia is resident in New Delhi, India.; There has been a significant Seychellois diaspora living in Australia, traditionally the largest outside Seychelles, although the number of Seychelles-born residents has dropped in recent years. The latest Australian Census in 2016 recorded 2,519 Seychelles-born people in Australia. The diaspora is significantly enlarged by second and third-generations of Seychellois ancestry who maintain links with the island nation. Many Seychelles political and business leaders have studied in Australia.; Total merchandise trade between the two countries in 2019–2020 was valued at A$10.6 million.; Australian governor-general Quentin Bryce made a state visit to Seychelles in April 2009 to promote bilateral relations. This was reciprocated in August 2011 by the state visit of President James Michel.; An Australian lawyer heads the Truth, Reconciliation and National Unity Commission (TRNUC) established by the Seychelles National Assembly in 2018. The TRNUC is examining the political, human rights and legal legacy of Seychelles long-time authoritarian ruler France-Albert René. |
| Sierra Leone | 9 October 1981 | Australia and Sierra Leone have enjoyed good relations as members of the Commonwealth of Nations. Diplomatic relations were formally established in October 1981 with the appointment of the first non-resident Australian high commissioner.; Australia is accredited to Sierra Leone from its high commission in Accra, Ghana.; Sierra Leone is accredited to Australia from its embassy in Beijing, China. It also has an honorary consulate-general in Sydney.; There is a small Sierra Leone community in Australia, the majority of whom have come after 2001 under the Humanitarian Program. The 2016 Australian census recorded 3,410 Sierra Leone-born persons.; Australia has been active in contributing capacity development and small development projects in Sierra Leone, including support to peace building through financial and technical assistance to the UN Peace building Fund and the Special Court for Sierra Leone.; Bilateral trade is modest. Total merchandise trade in 2019–2020 was A$4.5 million. |
| Somalia | 16 February 1982 | Australia and Somalia first formalized diplomatic relations in February 1982 when a non-resident Somali ambassador presented credentials in Canberra. This subsequently lapsed and the two countries re-established diplomatic relations in 2010.; Australia's ambassador to Somalia is accredited from Nairobi, Kenya.; Somalia's ambassador to Australia is accredited from Jakarta, Indonesia. The first ambassador since the 1980s presented credentials in February 2026.; Australia has supported the state-building and counter-terrorism efforts of the UN Assistance Mission in Somalia (UNSOM) and the African Union Mission in Somalia (AMISOM) and has provided humanitarian assistance. Australia's first involvement was to support the United Nations-approved Unified Task Force (UNITAF) which delivered humanitarian aid in 1992–1993. The Australian operation was called Operation Solace and involved the deployment of some 900 military personnel to provide a secure environment for the distribution of humanitarian aid in the Baidoa region. In May 1993, UNITAF handed over to a reinforced UNOSOM II. The Australian Battalion Group withdrew to Australia. The Australian Defence Force Contingent provided movement control, air traffic control, some HQ staff and a ready reaction security team at the Mogadishu airport. The Australian force was withdrawn in 1996.; Australia provided over $61 million to Somalia in 2011 in response to the Horn of Africa humanitarian crisis and has since provided funding to support the AMISOM mission and humanitarian projects.; In September 2012 following the election of Hassan Sheikh Ahmed Mohamoud, foreign minister Bob Carr said," Australia shares the cautious optimism of the international community about Somalia's future prospects."; There is a small Somali community in Australia. Most Somalis began to settle in Australia in the early 1990s following the outbreak of the civil war in Somalia. About 80 per cent of the new arrivals came under the aegis of the local Refugee and Special Humanitarian Program. The latest Census in 2016 recorded 7,668 Somalia-born people in Australia, half of whom are resident in Victoria. See Somali Australians for more information.; Trading ties are modest and mainly comprise Australian merchandise exports. In 2019–2020 this was valued at A$1.8m |
| South Africa | 8 May 1946 | See Australia–South Africa relations Australian governor-general Quentin Bryce meets with Nelson Mandela during her stopover in South Africa, 24 March 2009.: Australia announced the appointment of its first High Commissioner to South Africa in May 1946, with the high commission being established in Cape Town from August 1946.; The Australian High Commission later moved to Pretoria. For a detailed history of Australian representation in South Africa see List of high commissioners of Australia to South Africa.; South Africa established a High Commission in Canberra in 1949. For a detailed history of South African representation in Australia see List of high commissioners of South Africa to Australia.; Both countries are historically linked through the British Empire and are members of the Commonwealth of Nations. Following the adoption of the apartheid policy by South Africa in 1948, relations became increasingly strained, particularly from the 1970s onwards, although diplomatic relations were maintained. Relations have been normalized since the inauguration of the first democratically elected Government of South Africa in May 1994, and there are substantial political, economic and people-to-people links between the two countries.; In his first year of freedom, Nelson Mandela visited Australia in 1990 to thank the country for opposing apartheid.; According to the 2016 Australian census, 162,450 Australian residents were born in South Africa. South African-born immigrants have distinguished themselves in sport, the arts, media and business – see South African Australians.; South Africa is Australia's largest export market in Africa with two-way trade in goods and services totaling A$3.141 billion in 2021. South Africa is also Australia's most significant investment partner in Africa, with bilateral investment valued at A$15.2 billion in 2021.; Both countries are members of the Indian Ocean Rim Association (IORA) and the Antarctic Treaty System. |
| South Sudan | 24 September 2011 | Foreign Minister Kevin Rudd and his South Sudanese counterpart, Foreign Affairs and International Cooperation Minister Nhial Deng Nhial, sign a joint communique establishing diplomatic relations between Australia and South Sudan.: Australia and South Sudan established diplomatic relations on 24 September 2011.; Australia's ambassador is accredited on a non-resident basis from Addis Ababa, Ethiopia.; South Sudan's ambassador is accredited on a non-resident basis from Beijing.; Australia is home to a significant South Sudanese community. According to the 2016 Australian Housing and Population Census, 7,699 Australian residents were born in South Sudan. Community leaders estimate that, counting persons born when South Sudan was part of the Republic of Sudan, and who report their birthplace as Sudan, the total is about 20,000. The majority of the South Sudan-born population arrived in Australia between 2001 and 2006 under Australia's refugee resettlement program. South Sudanese Australians have distinguished themselves in a wide variety of fields including sport, fashion, music and law.; Australia has contributed almost $113 million in humanitarian assistance to South Sudan since the outbreak of conflict in December 2013, including over $60 million since 2017.; Australia has a contingent of Australian Defence Force personnel in South Sudan who have been deployed with the United Nations Mission in South Sudan (UNMISS) since its inception in 2011. |
| Sudan | 8 February 1974 | Australia is accredited to Sudan from its embassy in Cairo, Egypt.; Sudan has an embassy in Canberra, which took over the old Eritrean embassy and opened in 2017.; Although Australia had been critical of human rights violations and political repression in Sudan, and has applied Sudan-related UN sanctions, relations have improved since 2017. In September 2018, Australia and Sudan held inaugural Senior Officials Talks in Canberra.; The 2016 Australian Census recorded 17,031 Sudan-born people in Australia. Since 2001 many immigrants from Sudan, or those born to Sudanese parents in regugee camps, have come under the Humanitarian Program.; Trade between the two countries is modest, totalling about A$10m in 2019–2020. Sudan regularly attends the Africa Down Under and the International Mining and Resources Conferences at ministerial level. |
| Tanzania | 11 May 1962 | Australia announced the establishment of diplomatic relations with Tanganyika on 11 May 1962. A resident high commission was opened in July 1962.; The post was closed in 1987 for budgetary reasons.; Australia has since been accredited to Tanzania from its high commission in Nairobi, Kenya.; Tanzania is accredited to Australia from its embassy in Tokyo, Japan. It also has honorary consulates in Adelaide and Perth.; President Julius Nyerere made a 5-day state visit to Australia in March 1974.; Australian governor-general Quentin Bryce paid a state visit to Tanzania in March 2009.; There is a small Tanzanian community in Australia, with the Australian Census in 2016 recording 3,830 Tanzanian-born persons.; Several Australian companies are involved in mining projects in Tanzania, and minerals and engineering equipment are Australia's main exports to the country. Tanzania's main exports to Australia are coffee and agricultural crops. Two-way merchandise trade between Australia and Tanzania was over $61 million in 2018–19. |
| Togo | 22 July 2009 | Australia and Togo established diplomatic relations in 2009 as part of a broadening of Australia's engagement with Africa under the Governments of Kevin Rudd and Julia Gillard.; The Australian high commissioner is accredited from Accra.; Togo has not yet established representation to Australia. |
| Tunisia | 17 February 1977 | Australia is accredited to Tunisia from its high commission in Malta.; Tunisia maintained an embassy in Canberra for a number of years until 2021 and is now accredited to Australia from its embassy in Jakarta, Indonesia. It also has an honorary consulate in Brisbane.; Australia and Tunisia have a modest trading relationship, with two-way merchandise trade valued at about A$40 million in 2019–2020. |
| Uganda | 23 August 1965 | Australia and Uganda have enjoyed good relations as members of the Commonwealth of Nations. Diplomatic relations were announced in August 1965 with the accreditation of Australia's high commissioner based in Nairobi, Kenya. Australia also has an honorary consulate in Kampala.; Uganda has a high commission in Canberra and an honorary consulate in Perth.; The Australian-Uganda trade relationship is modest, with two-way merchandise trade and investment reaching almost A$7 million in 2018–19. The main Australian exports are engineering equipment, and the main imports are coffee and spices. |
| Zambia | 1972 | Australia is accredited to Zambia from its embassy in Harare, Zimbabwe.; Zambia has a high commission in Canberra.; Both countries are full members of Commonwealth of Nations.; Australian governor-general Quentin Bryce made a state visit to Zambia in March 2009 to promote bilateral relations. |
| Zimbabwe | 18 April 1980 | See Australia–Zimbabwe relations: Australia and Zimbabwe established diplomatic relations upon Zimbabwe's independence on 18 April 1980. The Australian liaison office in Harare (then Salisbury) was upgraded on that date to a high commission (embassy since 2003 when Zimbabwe left the Commonwealth). For a detailed history of Australian representation in Zimbabwe see List of ambassadors of Australia to Zimbabwe.; Zimbabwe has an embassy in Canberra, which opened in 1988.; Australia played a leading role in the Lancaster House negotiations for the internationally recognised decolonisation of Southern Rhodesia and the then Australian prime minister Malcolm Fraser attended the independence celebrations on the invitation of then Prime Minister Robert Mugabe. Australia had contributed to the Commonwealth Ceasefire Monitoring Force.; Relations between the two countries soured in the late 1990s, following the implementation in Zimbabwe of a controversial land reform program and later the increasingly autocratic behaviour of the Mugabe government. In 2002, the Howard government in Australia imposed targeted sanctions against members of the Zimbabwean government in protest against the deteriorating political situation in Zimbabwe. These sanctions, adjusted over time, remain in force as of 2021. They include an arms embargo and sanctions against listed individuals designated as having seriously undermined democracy, respect for human rights or the rule of law in Zimbabwe.; There is a significant Zimbabwean diaspora in Australia. The latest Census in 2016 recorded 34,787 Zimbabwe-born people in Australia. While most of these are white Zimbabweans and of English or Scottish backgrounds, there are growing numbers of people of indigenous Shona and Ndebele ethnicities. Zimbabwean Australians across ethnic backgrounds have distinguished themselves in sports, music and the arts.; Following Zimbabwe's independence, trade between the countries developed modestly, but is presently minimal (two-way trade in 2019–2020 was only about A$2 million). |

=== Americas ===
| Country | Formal relations began | Notes |
|---|---|---|
| Antigua and Barbuda | | Australia and Antigua and Barbuda enjoy good relations, with links through shared membership of the Commonwealth of Nations and sporting ties, particularly cricket.; Both countries have established diplomatic relations.; Australia is accredited to Antigua and Barbuda from its High Commission in Port of Spain, Trinidad and Tobago.; Antigua and Barbuda have not yet established representation in Australia. |
| Argentina | 10 December 1959 | See Argentina–Australia relations: Australia and Argentina agreed in December 1959 through an exchange of notes to establish diplomatic relations.; Australia has an embassy in Buenos Aires, established in 1962. For a detailed history of Australian representation in Argentina see List of ambassadors of Australia to Argentina.; Argentina has an embassy in Canberra and a consulate-general in Sydney.; There is significant trade and investment between the two countries. Two-way merchandise trade in 2021–22 was over A$1.5 billion. In 2021 Australian investment in Argentina was valued at just over A$1 billion.; The two countries have a reciprocal work and holiday visa agreement and Australia is a destination for Argentine students studying abroad.; In July 1986, President Raúl Alfonsin became the first Argentine head of state to visit Australia. In March 1998, President Carlos Menem also made a state visit to Australia. Governor-general Peter Cosgrove made a state visit to Argentina in 2016. Scott Morrison was the first Australian prime minister to visit Argentina during 2018 G20 Buenos Aires summit.; Both countries are members of multi-national groups such as the G20 and Cairns Group and share common interests in many issues such as Antarctica and international peacekeeping. |
| Bahamas | 7 January 1974 | Australia and the Bahamas enjoy good relations, with links through shared membership of the Commonwealth of Nations and sporting ties, particularly cricket.; Formal diplomatic relations between the two countries were announced on 7 January 1974.; Australia is accredited to the Bahamas from its High Commission in Port of Spain, Trinidad and Tobago.; The Bahamas has an honorary consulate in Sydney. |
| Barbados | 7 January 1974 | See Australia–Barbados relations: Australia and Barbados enjoy good relations, with links through shared membership of the Commonwealth of Nations and sporting ties, particularly cricket.; Formal diplomatic relations between the two countries were announced on 7 January 1974.; Australia is accredited to Barbados from its high commission in Port of Spain, Trinidad and Tobago.; The lone Australian High Commission in the Caribbean was located in Bridgetown, Barbados from 1994 to 2004, before it moved to Port of Spain. Australia also has an honorary consulate in Bridgetown.; Barbados is accredited to Australia from its High Commission in Ottawa, Canada. |
| Belize | 17 January 1982 | Australia and Belize enjoy good relations, with links through shared membership of the Commonwealth of Nations. Australia and Belize are Co-Chairs with Mauritius of the Commonwealth Blue Charter Action Group on Coral Reef Protection and Restoration, and members of the International Coral Reef Initiative.; Australia is accredited to Belize from its High Commission in Port of Spain, Trinidad and Tobago.; Belize has an honorary consulate in Sydney. |
| Bolivia | 10 April 1975 | The first non-resident Australian ambassador to Bolivia presented credentials on 14 October 1975.; Australia is accredited to Bolivia from its embassy in Lima, Peru and maintains an honorary consulate in La Paz.; Bolivia is accredited to Australia from its embassy in Ottawa, Canada and maintains an honorary consulate in Sydney.; Bolivia and Australia work together, as part of the Cairns Group, on agricultural trade reform. In 2002 the Australian Minister for Trade and Investment Mark Vaile visited Santa Cruz for a Cairns Group meeting. Australia also provides a small amount of development assistance to Bolivia at local community level through its Direct Aid Program.; There is a small bilateral trade relationship. Total merchandise trade in 2020 was A$26 million, mostly comprising Bolivian food-related exports to Australia. There is investment in mining services and technology.; Australia–Bolivia bilateral treaties include two extradition treaties. |
| Brazil | 7 June 1945 | See Australia–Brazil relations: Australia has an embassy in Brasília, a consulate-general in São Paulo and an honorary consulate in Rio de Janeiro. For a detailed history of Australian representation in Brazil see List of ambassadors of Australia to Brazil.; Brazil has an embassy in Canberra and a consulate general in Sydney and honorary consulates in Adelaide, Brisbane, Darwin, Hobart, Melbourne, and Perth.; Brazilians form the largest migrant group from Latin America resident in Australia – see Brazilian Australians. The 2016 Australian census recorded 27,625 residents born in Brazil and 21,353 residents of Brazilian descent. As of 2020, Brazil was also the fifth largest source of international students studying in Australia.; Two-way trade in goods and services in 2021–22 was A$4.8 billion, a significant element of which was Australian exports of coal. Australian investments in Brazil in 2021 was valued at A$9.6 billion and Brazilian investments in Australia totaled almost A$5 billion.; Prime Minister Julia Gillard visited Brazil in 2012 and Brazilian president Dilma Rousseff visited Australia for a G20 meeting in 2014. Governor-general Peter Cosgrove visited Brazil during the 2016 Olympic Games in Rio de Janeiro. |
| Canada | 12 September 1939 | See Australia–Canada relations Australia House, Canada, is an example of an Australian mission (it serves as the ambassadorial residence). As Canada is a fellow Commonwealth nation, Australia maintains a High Commission there.: Australia and Canada have a longstanding relationship that has been fostered by both countries' shared history and culture as former British Dominions and present members of the Commonwealth of Nations. There are significant political, economic, academic and people-to-people links.; Australia has a high commission in Ottawa, a consulate-general in Toronto, and a consulate in Vancouver. For a detailed history of Australian representation in Canada see List of high commissioners of Australia to Canada.; Canada has a high commission in Canberra and a consulate-general in Sydney. For a detailed history of Canadian representation in Australia see List of high commissioners of Canada to Australia.; The Australian 2016 Census recorded 43,053 Canada-born people in Australia. There is a working holiday program in place which allows young people to travel and work for set periods in each other's country.; Bilateral trade and investment is substantial. In 2019–20, two-way trade was $4.7 billion in goods and A$3 billion in services. At the end of 2019, Australian investment in Canada was valued at $83.4 billion and Canadian investment in Australia was valued at $60.7 billion. Both countries are members of the Asia-Pacific Economic Cooperation forum and signatories to the Comprehensive and Progressive Agreement for Trans-Pacific Partnership (CPTPP).; Canada's and Australia's militaries have fought alongside each other numerous times including the Second Boer War, World War I, World War II, the Korean War and many United Nations Security Council-sanctioned missions. To maintain this military alliance, a Canadian Defence Advisor is stationed at the High Commission in Canberra to share intelligence. Australia and Canada both contributed to the International force in East Timor and both worked closely together to fight terrorism in Afghanistan. They are both members of the Five Eyes intelligence alliance.; Canada, Australia and New Zealand have a history of working together in the United Nations (UN) on issues ranging from security to development to human rights, including through an informal grouping known as CANZ.; There are regular high level exchanges of political visits between the two countries. Australian prime ministers John Curtin and John Howard have addressed joint sessions of the Canadian Parliament in 1944 and 2006 respectively. In 2007 Stephen Harper became the first Canadian prime minister to address the Australian Parliament. Australian governor-general Quentin Bryce visited Canada in 2013. |
| Chile | 27 December 1945 | See Australia–Chile relations: During the Australian gold rush of the 1850s, Chile became one of Australia's major food suppliers. After 1866, however, interaction and trade was minimal until after the Second World War.; The intention to exchange diplomatic representatives between the two countries was announced in April 1945. The Chilean consulate was upgraded to a legation and headed by a Chargé d'Affaires en titre from July 1945. The first Australian Minister to Chile was appointed in January 1946 and presented credentials in August 1946. The Australian legation closed for budgetary reasons in 1949. Relations were upgraded to ambassadorial level in the 1960s when the Australian embassy was opened in 1968 and Chile reciprocated with an upgrade of its legation in 1969. For a detailed history of Australian representation in Chile see List of ambassadors of Australia to Chile.; Australia has an embassy in Santiago.; Chile has an embassy in Canberra, consulates-general in Melbourne and Sydney and honorary consulates in Brisbane and Perth.; In 1993, President Patricio Aylwin became the first Chilean head of state to pay an official visit to Australia. In 2004, Prime Minister John Howard became the first Australian head of government to visit Chile and to attend the APEC Summit. Governor General Peter Cosgrove made a state visit to Chile in 2016.; There are strong people-to-people links between the two countries. The 2016 Australian census recorded 26,086 Chile-born people in Australia. Australia is also a popular destination for Chilean students and there is a working holiday agreement between the two countries. See also Chilean Australians.; Both countries are members of APEC and the Cairns Group. Australia and Chile signed the Australia-Chile Free Trade Agreement on 30 July 2008. The agreement came into effect in the first quarter of 2009.; Two-way merchandise trade in 2020 was over A$1.26 billion and Australian investment in Chile was A$2.8 billion. |
| Colombia | 9 September 1975 | See Australia–Colombia relations: Australia has an embassy in Bogotá, upgraded from a consulate-general in 2017. Prior to this it was accredited on a non-resident basis from neighbouring Latin American countries. For a detailed history of Australian representation in Colombia see List of ambassadors of Australia to Colombia.; Colombia has an embassy in Canberra, a consulate-general in Sydney and honorary consulates in Brisbane, Darwin and Perth.; Economic problems and violence led to an emigration of Colombians to Australia in the 1980s. Colombians are one of the largest South American migrant groups in Australia – see Colombian Australians. The 2016 Australian census recorded 18,996 residents born in Colombia and 17,984 residents of Colombian descent. Australia is also an increasing destination for Colombians studying abroad, with almost 19,000 recorded in 2020.; Two-way trade in goods and services in 2021–22 totaled A$867 million, a significant element of which was Australian educational services to Colombian students. In 2021 Australian investments in Colombia totaled A$633 million.; Both armies fought alongside each other in the Korean war. |
| Costa Rica | 15 October 1974 | In 1884, Costa Rica opened a consular office in New South Wales. Australia and Costa Rica established formal diplomatic relations in October 1974, with the presentation of credentials of Australia's first non-resident Ambassador.; Australia is accredited to Costa Rica through its embassy in Mexico City. It also has an honorary consulate in San Jose.; Costa Rica opened an embassy in Canberra in 2017. It also has an honorary consulate in Sydney.; Costa Rica is Australia's second largest trading partner in Central America. Bilateral merchandise trade in 2019–2020 was A$132 million, mostly Australian imports of medical instruments and other manufactured goods. |
| Cuba | 31 January 1989 | Australia is accredited to Cuba from its embassy in Mexico City, Mexico.; Cuba has an embassy in Canberra, opened on 24 October 2008, and a consulate-general in Sydney.; Prior to a thawing of relations in the late 1980s, official exchanges between the two countries were limited and, from the early 1960s, characterized by the two countries being firmly on opposite sides of the Cold War. Australia was suspicious of Cuban internationalist activities in the Pacific and only in the 1980s was a Cuban consulate allowed to open in Sydney. This changed substantially as the Cold War began to be wound down. Full diplomatic relations were established under the Bob Hawke government in January 1989.; Since 1996, Australia has voted in favor of Cuba's annual resolution in the United Nations General Assembly calling for an end to the United States embargo against Cuba.; Since the 1990s, Australia has recognised the value of Cuban development engagement in the Pacific and has worked with Cuba to support the integration of Cuban-trained doctors into Pacific Island health systems.; An Australia-Cuba Business Council, set up on 2015, promotes business, sport, and cultural exchange.; There have been exchanges in recent years at senior ministerial level, with Australian foreign ministers Gareth Evans, Stephen Smith and Julie Bishop visiting Cuba in 1995, 2009 and 2017 respectively, Cuban foreign minister Bruno Rodriguez visiting Australia in 2010 and Cuban Vice Foreign Minister Marcelino Medina González visiting in 2018. |
| Dominica | | Australia and Dominica enjoy good relations, with links through shared membership of the Commonwealth of Nations and sporting ties, particularly cricket.; Australia is accredited to Dominica from its High Commission in Port of Spain, Trinidad and Tobago.; Dominica has not yet established representation in Australia.; The Australian Government provided A$1.5 million in humanitarian assistance to Dominica through the International Organization for Migration and the United Nations Population Fund after Hurricane Maria in 2017. |
| Dominican Republic | 22 April 1997 | Australia and the Dominican Republic established diplomatic relations on 22 April 1997; Australia is accredited to the Dominican Republic from its embassy in Mexico City, Mexico.; The Dominican Republic is accredited to Australia from its embassy in Tokyo, Japan. It also has an honorary consulate in Adelaide.; Bilateral merchandise trade in 2019–20 was valued at almost A$69 million, a large component being Australian imports of medical instruments. |
| Ecuador | | Australia is accredited to Ecuador from its embassy in Santiago, Chile and has an honorary consulate in Guayaquil.; Ecuador has an embassy in Canberra and honorary consulates in Adelaide and Melbourne.; There is a small Ecuadorian community in Australia. The 2016 Australian census recorded 2,225 Ecuador-born residents and 2,153 residents of Ecuardorian descent. A new Work and Holiday Visa arrangement between Australia and Ecuador commenced in 2019–20.; Trade between the two countries is modest, amounting to A$93 million in 2021–22. In November 2017, an Australia-Ecuador Business Summit was held in Quito to promote Australia's expertise and capacity to support Ecuador's growing mining sector. |
| El Salvador | 5 December 1983 | See Australia–El Salvador relations: Australia is accredited to El Salvador from its embassy in Mexico City, Mexico and has an honorary consulate in San Salvador.; El Salvador has an embassy in Canberra, a consulate-general in Melbourne and honorary consulates in Brisbane and Sydney.; In response to the civil war in El Salvador, between 1983 and 1986 Australia accepted around 10,000 Salvadorans under the Special Humanitarian Program. The Salvadoran community in Australia is estimated at 20,000. Australia is home to the third largest Salvadoran community living abroad. See also Salvadoran Australians. |
| Grenada | | Australia and Grenada enjoy good relations, with political links through shared membership of the Commonwealth of Nations and sporting ties, particularly cricket.; Australia is accredited to Grenada from its High Commission in Port of Spain, Trinidad and Tobago.; Grenada has not yet established diplomatic representation in Australia. |
| Guatemala | 7 January 1974 | Australia is accredited to Guatemala from its embassy in Mexico City, Mexico and has an honorary consulate in Tegucigalpa.; Guatemala has an embassy in Canberra and honorary consulates in Melbourne and Sydney.; Bilateral trade is modest, amounting to A$46m in 2021–22. An important element of this was Australian imports of coffee. |
| Guyana | 7 January 1974 | Australia and Guyana enjoy good relations, with political links through shared membership of the Commonwealth of Nations and sporting ties, particularly cricket.; Formal diplomatic relations between the two countries were announced on 7 January 1974.; Australia is accredited to Guyana from its high commission in Port of Spain, Trinidad and Tobago.; Guyana is accredited to Australia from its high commission in Ottawa, Canada.; Bilateral merchandise trade between the two countries was A$7 million in 2019–20. Guyana attended at ministerial level the 2017 Latin America Down Under Conference in Perth, to promote investment and cooperation in the mining sector. |
| Haiti | 2000 | Australia and Haiti established diplomatic relations in 2000.; Australia is accredited to Haiti from its High Commission in Trinidad and Tobago.; Haiti has an honorary consulate in Melbourne.; After the devastating 2010 earthquake, the Australian Government provided A$26.7 million in humanitarian assistance to Haiti which was matched by A$26 million from the Australian public. Australia has since provided further humanitarian aid to Haiti after subsequent natural disasters, including Hurricane Matthew in 2016. |
| Honduras | 10 July 1984 | Both countries established diplomatic relations on 10 July 1984 when Mr. Cavan Hogue, Australian Ambassador presented his credentials to President of Honduras Roberto Suazo Cordova.: Australia and Honduras established diplomatic relations in 1984.; Australia is accredited to Honduras from its embassy in Mexico City, Mexico. It also has an honorary consulate in Tegucigalpa.; Honduras has not yet established representation in Australia.; Bilateral merchandise trade in 2019–20 reached A$81 million, mostly Australian imports of mineral ores, coffee and textiles. |
| Jamaica | 7 January 1974 | Australia and Jamaica enjoy good relations through shared membership of the Commonwealth of Nations and sporting ties, particularly cricket.; Formal diplomatic relations between the two countries were announced on 7 January 1974.; Australia is accredited to Jamaica from its high commission in Port of Spain, Trinidad and Tobago. It has an honorary consulate in Kingston. The Australian high commission to the Caribbean was located in Kingston From 1975 until 1994, when it moved to Barbados.; Jamaica is accredited to Australia from its embassy in Tokyo, Japan. It has an honorary consulate in Sydney.; Bilateral merchandise trade in 2019–20 was valued at A$33 million, a large component of which was Australian meat exports. |
| Mexico | 14 March 1966 | See Australia–Mexico relations: Australia has an embassy in Mexico City and an honorary consulate in Cancun.; Mexico has an embassy in Canberra and honorary consulates in Brisbane, Melbourne, Perth and Sydney.; Mexico is Australia's largest merchandise trading partner in Latin America. Two way trade in goods and services in 2021–22 was over $4.4 billion, substantially Australian imports of vehicles and other manufactures and metal ores. Australian investments in Mexico in 2021 totaled A$5.9 billion, primarily in the infrastructure and energy sectors, and Mexican investments in Australia were valued at A$0.5 billion.; The expanding trade relationship is supported by mutual membership of APEC and the Comprehensive and Progressive Agreement for Trans-Pacific Partnership (CPTPP), Australia's first free trade agreement with Mexico.; The two countries also work closely together on international questions through the MIKTA group, an informal middle power partnership between Mexico, Indonesia, South Korea, Turkey, and Australia.; In 1973, Prime Minister Gough Whitlam became the first Australian head-of-government to pay an official visit to Mexico, followed later by prime ministers Malcolm Fraser, John Howard and Julia Gillard in 1981, 2002 and 2012 respectively. In 1990, Carlos Salinas de Gortari became the first Mexican president to visit Australia. This was followed by President Felipe Calderón in 2007 and President Enrique Peña Nieto in 2014. Governor-general Peter Cosgrove made a state visit to Mexico in August 2016, coinciding with the 50th anniversary of diplomatic relations. |
| Nicaragua | 1987 | Australia and Nicaragua established diplomatic relations in 1987.; Australia is accredited to Nicaragua from its embassy in Mexico City, Mexico.; Nicaragua is accredited to Australia from its embassy in Tokyo, Japan.; Bilateral merchandise trade is modest. In 2019–20 this was valued at A$18.6 million, half of which was Australian imports of coffee. |
| Panama | 1974 | Australia and Panama established diplomatic relations in 1974.; Australia is accredited to Panama from its embassy in Mexico City, Mexico. It has an honorary consulate in Panama City.; Panama opened an embassy in Canberra in 2018. It also has an honorary consulate-general in Sydney.; Bilateral merchandise trade is modest. In 2019–20 this reached A$80 million, mostly Australian exports of manufactured articles. |
| Paraguay | 30 November 1974 | See Australia–Paraguay relations: Australia and Paraguay established diplomatic relations in 1974, with the first non-resident Australian ambassador presenting his credentials on 2 December 1974.; Australia is accredited to Paraguay from its embassy in Buenos Aires, Argentina. It has an honorary consulate in Asunción.; Paraguay opened an embassy in Canberra in 2011 but this was closed in 2024. Representation is maintained through a consulate-general in Sydney.; As agricultural producers and exporters, the two countries work together to achieve fairer international trade in agricultural products through membership of the Cairns Group and cooperation in other multilateral fora. Australia is also increasing its engagement with Paraguay through development cooperation and people-to-people exchanges. An increasing number of Paraguayan students are pursuing their education at Australian institutions. |
| Peru | 1 March 1963 | Main article: Australia–Peru relations: Australia has an embassy in Lima. For a detailed history of Australian representation in Peru see List of ambassadors of Australia to Peru.; Peru has an embassy in Canberra, a consulate-general in Sydney, and honorary consulates in Brisbane, Melbourne and Perth.; There are growing people-to-people links between Australia and Peru. The 2016 Australian census recorded 9,553 residents born in Peru. There is a working holiday visa agreement between the two countries and Australia is a destination for Peruvian students studying abroad.; Economic ties between the two countries have developed rapidly in recent years. In 2018–19, Australia's two-way trade with Peru was worth A$656 million. A Peru-Australia Free Trade Agreement (PAFTA) entered into force on 11 February 2020.; Australian prime minister Malcolm Turnbull visited Peru in 2016 to attend the APEC summit. |
| Saint Kitts and Nevis | 6 February 1986 | Australia and Saint Kitts and Nevis enjoy good relations, with political links through shared membership of the Commonwealth of Nations and sporting ties, particularly cricket. Formal diplomatic relations were established with the presentation of credentials of Australia's first non-resident high commissioner on 6 February 1986.; Australia is accredited to St Kitts and Nevis from its High Commission in Port of Spain, Trinidad and Tobago.; St Kitts and Nevis have not yet established diplomatic representation in Australia. |
| Saint Lucia | 1982 | Australia and Saint Lucia enjoy good relations, with political links through shared membership of the Commonwealth of Nations and sporting ties, particularly cricket.; Australia is accredited to Saint Lucia from its High Commission in Port of Spain, Trinidad and Tobago.; Saint Lucia has not yet established diplomatic representation in Australia. |
| Saint Vincent and the Grenadines | 31 January 1986 | Australia and Saint Vincent and the Grenadines enjoy good relations, with political links through shared membership of the Commonwealth of Nations and sporting ties, particularly cricket. Formal diplomatic relations were established with the presentation of credentials of Australia's first non-resident high commissioner on 31 January 1986.; Australia is accredited to Saint Vincent and the Grenadines from its High Commission in Port of Spain, Trinidad and Tobago.; Saint Vincent and the Grenadines have an honorary consulate in Sydney. |
| Suriname | 3 February 1994 | Australia is accredited to Suriname from its high commission in Port of Spain, Trinidad and Tobago.; Suriname is accredited to Australia from its embassy in Jakarta, Indonesia.; Bilateral trade is modest, valued at A$12 million in 2021-11 and mostly Australian vehicle exports. |
| Trinidad and Tobago | 7 January 1974 | Australia and Trinidad and Tobago enjoy good relations, with political links through shared membership of the Commonwealth of Nations and have sporting ties, particularly cricket.; Australia has a high commission in Port of Spain which is also accredited on a non-resident basis to other Commonwealth Caribbean countries. For a detailed history of Australian representation in Trinidad and Tobago see Australian High Commissioner to Trinidad and Tobago.; Trinidad and Tobago has not yet established representation in Australia.; Prime Minister Keith Rowley visited Australia in May 2018.; Bilateral trade reached A$75 million in 2020–21, the main elements being Australian meat and cheese exports and fertilizer imports. BHP is Australia's largest investor in Trinidad and Tobago, accounting for approximately 10% of Trinidad and Tobago's oil and gas production. |
| United States | 8 January 1940 | Prime Minister of Australia, John Howard, with US President George W. Bush on 16 May 2006, during Howard's seventh official visit to the White House as prime minister. From left to right: the Prime Minister's wife Janette Howard, former US First Lady Laura Bush, Howard and Bush. See Australia–United States relations While Australia has emphasised its relationship with the United States since 1942, as Britain's influence in Asia declined. At the governmental level, United-States-Australia relations are formalized by the ANZUS treaty and the Australia-United States Free Trade Agreement.: Australia has an embassy in Washington, D.C., and has consulates-general in Chicago, Honolulu, Houston, Los Angeles, New York City and San Francisco.; United States has an embassy in Canberra and consulates-general in Melbourne, Perth and Sydney. |
| Uruguay | 1948 | See Australia–Uruguay relations: Australia is accredited to Uruguay from its embassy in Buenos Aires, Argentina and maintains an honorary consulate in Montevideo.; Uruguay has an embassy in Canberra and a consulate-general in Sydney.; Australia and Uruguay have had consular relations since 1923 and diplomatic relations since 1948 through an exchange of notes. Uruguay opened a legation in Canberra in 1958 and this was raised to embassy in 1968 with the concurrent non-resident accreditation of an Australian ambassador.; The first migrants from Uruguay came to Australia in the 1960s with growing numbers in the 1970s due to repression by the then military dictatorship in Uruguay. The 2016 Australian census reported almost 9,000 Uruguay-born residents, and over 7,800 residents of Uruguayan descent.; The two countries share a long history of collaboration to advance global reforms of agricultural trade through the Cairns Group. Australia and Uruguay also share an interest in the Antarctic waters and the fisheries therein and collaborate through the Antarctic Treaty System.; Governor-general Peter Cosgrove made an official visit to Uruguay in August 2016. |
| Venezuela | 31 May 1973 | Australia is currently accredited to Venezuela from its embassy in Mexico City, Mexico. For a detailed history of Australian representation in Venezuela see List of ambassadors of Australia to Venezuela.; Venezuela has an embassy in Canberra.; During the 1970s, 1980s and 1990s Australian governments were keen to promote expanded trade and investment between the two countries. Australia maintained an embassy in Caracas from 1979 until 2002. Deputy Prime Minister and Minister for Trade Tim Fischer visited Caracas in June 1996 and as a result a number of key areas for development were identified including the mining, agriculture and maritime sectors. However progress has been constrained by political and economic instability in Venezuela, particularly since the launch of the Bolivarian Revolution by President Hugo Chávez .; Bilateral trade is currently small, amounting to about A$20 million in 2020, mostly related to export of educational services to Venezuelan students. Australia's investment interests in Venezuela have focussed on the mining and related services sectors.; There is a small Venezuelan community in Australia, expanded by skilled immigration since 2005. The 2016 Australian census recorded 5,460 Venezuela-born people in Australia.; Notwithstanding Australia's decision in January 2019 to formally recognise Juan Guaidó as interim president of Venezuela, the embassy in Canberra representing the Nicolás Maduro Government has remained fully accredited. |

=== Asia ===
| Country | Formal relations began | Notes |
|---|---|---|
| Afghanistan | 30 March 1969 | An Australian service light armored vehicle drives through Tangi Valley, Afghanistan, 29 March 2011.: Australia and Afghanistan have shared a friendly and long-standing relationship which can be traced back as far as the 1860s when Afghan cameleers came to Australia to contribute to the carriage of explorers, assistance in transportation for the wool and mining industry and supporting major inland infrastructure projects such as the overland telegraph and railways. The early cameleers built the first mosques in Australia, with the oldest permanent mosque built in Adelaide in 1888. The Ghan train is named in their honour.; Formal diplomatic relations were established in 1969. The Australian ambassador was accredited from Islamabad and the Afghan ambassador was accredited from Tokyo.; In 1975 the then Australian governor-general Sir John Kerr made the first state visit between the countries.; Diplomatic relations were suspended between the 1978 coup which deposed President Mohammed Daoud Khan and the overthrow of the Taliban regime in 2002. However consular relations were re-established in 1994 with the opening of an Afghan honorary consulate in Australia by the government of the Islamic State of Afghanistan. The consulate continued operation after the Taliban seized power in Kabul in 1996.; In late 2001, the Australian Defence Force commenced Operation Slipper as Australia's contribution to assist the NATO-led International Security Assistance Force mission in the War in Afghanistan and the war on terror to combat the Taliban and their allied groups. The operation ended on 31 December 2014 and was replaced with Operation Highroad, which commenced on 1 January 2015 to assist the NATO-led Resolute Support Mission. Australia completed a withdrawal of its remaining troops based in Afghanistan in June 2021; Diplomatic relations resumed in 2002. An Afghan embassy was opened in Canberra in July 2002 by the Interim Afghan administration of Hamid Karzai. The same year, Australia resumed its non-resident accreditation from Islamabad.; An Australian embassy was opened in Kabul in 2006. It has been closed since the end of May 2021. Since September 2021, an Australian Interim Mission on Afghanistan has been based in Doha, Qatar, headed by a Special Representative. For a detailed history of Australian diplomatic representation to Afghanistan see List of ambassadors of Australia to Afghanistan.; A Comprehensive Long-term Partnership Between Australia and the Islamic Republic of Afghanistan was signed in 2012 to provide the framework for Australian development assistance and the promotion of political, security, economic, social and cultural ties between the two nations.; Between 2001 and 2021, Australia provided more than $1.5 billion in Official Development Assistance to Afghanistan; Australia has also accepted many Afghan refugees, with the first wave following the Soviet invasion in 1979. According to the 2016 Australian census 46,800 Australians were born in Afghanistan – see Afghan Australians.; President Ashraf Ghani made the first visit to Australia by an Afghan head of state in April 2017. Governors-general Quentin Bryce, Peter Cosgrove and David Hurley and successive prime ministers visited Afghanistan in the period when Australian troops were stationed there.; Since the Taliban victory in 2021, Australia has not recognised the Islamic Emirate government and continues to accredit the embassy of the Islamic Republic in Canberra. |
| Armenia | 15 January 1992 | See Armenia–Australia relations: The Australian government recognised Armenia's independence on 26 December 1991, upon the dissolution of the Union of Soviet Socialist Republics and established diplomatic relations early the following year.; Australia's ambassador is accredited from Moscow, Russia.; Armenia's ambassador is accredited from Tokyo, Japan. The first Armenian ambassador presented credentials in December 2022.; A substantial number of Australians are of Armenian descent. The Armenian community in Australia is estimated to be 50,000 people, primarily residing in Sydney and Melbourne. The first Armenians migrated to Australia in the 1850s, during the gold rush. The majority came to Australia in the 1960s – 1990s from Egypt, Cyprus and Lebanon. Australians of Armenian descent have attained prominence in politics, business, sport, academia and culture – see Armenian Australians.; The Armenian foreign minister, H.E. Mr Vardan Oskanyan, visited Australia in October 2005.; The Parliament of the Commonwealth of Australia has not passed a motion recognising the Armenian genocide in 1915, although the State of New South Wales has done so.; In 2023, Australia provided AUD500,000 of humanitarian assistance to the United Nations High Commissioner for Refugees (UNHCR) to help more than 100,000 Nagorno-Karabakh Armenians now living in Armenia. |
| Azerbaijan | 19 June 1992 | See Australia–Azerbaijan relations: The Australian government recognised Azerbaijan's independence on 26 December 1991, upon the dissolution of the Union of Soviet Socialist Republics and established diplomatic relations the following year.; Australia is accredited to Azerbaijan from its embassy in Ankara, Turkey.; Azerbaijan has an embassy in Canberra.; Bilateral trade in 2021–22 was almost A$80 million, the major element being Australian imports of crude petroleum.; In February 2020, the government of Azerbaijan provided material assistance to Australia to combat the impact of forest fires.; With regard to Azerbaijan's conflict with Armenia over the Nagorno-Karabakh region, Australia supports the territorial integrity of Azerbaijan and the efforts of the Organization for Security and Co-operation in Europe Minsk Group to resolve the conflict. |
| Bahrain | 13 April 1987 | Australia has long standing ties with Bahrain that predate its full independence in 1971. Australia maintained a consulate-general in Manama from 1964 to 1986.; Formal diplomatic relations were established in April 1987 with the presentation of credentials of Australia's first non-resident ambassador.; Australia's ambassador is accredited from Riyadh and Bahrain's ambassador is accredited from Jakarta.; Bahrain is an important trading partner for Australia. In 2018–19, Australian merchandise exports were worth $1.43 billion. Australia's exports mainly comprised alumina, meat, dairy products and wheat.; Bahrain provides port access to Australian naval ships.; The two countries participate in the Australia, Bahrain and Israel Food Security Initiative under the 2020 Abraham Accords. |
| Bangladesh | 31 January 1972 | See Australia–Bangladesh relations: On 31 January 1972, Australia became the first country in the developed world to recognize Bangladesh's independence following the end of the Bangladesh Liberation War. An Australian deputy high commission was opened in Dhaka in April 1969 and this was upgraded to an embassy on 31 January 1972 and then high commission following Bangladesh's admission to the Commonwealth of Nations in April 1972. For a detailed history of Australian representation in Bangladesh see List of high commissioners of Australia to Bangladesh.; Bangladesh has a high commission in Canberra, a consulate-general in Sydney and an honorary consulate in Perth.; Since 1970, migration to Australia from Bangladesh steadily increased with the majority arriving as skilled migrants. The 2021 Census recorded more than 51,000 people born in Bangladesh living in Australia. Australia has also been an increasing destination for Bangladeshi students. In 2018, just under 7,000 Bangladeshi students enrolled to study in Australia.; The two countries enjoy a competitive sporting relationship in Test Cricket.; Australia and Bangladesh work closely on a range of common strategic interests in regional and global fora, including as members of the Indian Ocean Rim Association and the Bali Process on People Smuggling, Trafficking in Persons and Related Transnational Crime. In 2008, Bangladesh signed a bilateral counter-terrorism MOU with Australia, their first with any country.; Bilateral trade in 2021–22 reached over A$3.6 billion, including A$1.5 billion in Australian imports mostly in the textile sector. Bangladesh is an important importer of Australian agricultural produce and education services. Australian investments in Bangladesh totaled A$324 million in 2021.; Bangladesh is a significant recipient of foreign aid from Australia. Total official development assistance in 2023–2024 was A$116.2 million |
| Bhutan | 14 September 2002 | Relations between Bhutan and Australia date back to 1962 when Bhutan was just emerging from self-imposed isolation and starting to engage with the rest of the world. Australia's support at the time was instrumental in Bhutan being admitted as a member of the Colombo Plan. Subsequently, Australia was among the first countries to support and welcome Bhutan's membership to the United Nations in 1971.; Australia and Bhutan established formal diplomatic relations on 14 September 2002.; Australia's ambassador is accredited from New Delhi.; Bhutan established a resident embassy in Canberra in September 2021, having previously accredited its ambassador from Bangkok. Bhutan also has an honorary consulate in Sydney.; There has been a rapid increase in recent years in Bhutanese immigration and student enrollments in Australia, resulting in Bhutan's largest diaspora. More than 35,000 Bhutanese are resident in Australia as of October 2024.; Australia is a modest trade and development cooperation partner to Bhutan. Total Australian Official Development Assistance to Bhutan in 2023–2024 was budgeted for A$4.9m million.; In October 2016, LyonchhenTshering Tobgay made the first visit by a Bhutanese prime minister to Australia. His Majesty King Jigme Khesar Namgyel Wangchuck made the first visit by a Bhutanese head of state in October 2024. |
| Brunei | 1 January 1984 | See Australia–Brunei relations: Bilateral historical links stretch back to the Second World War when, in 1945, Australian forces landed at Muara Beach as part of the Allied campaign to liberate Borneo, and common membership of the Commonwealth of Nations.; Australia established a resident commission in Bandar Seri Begawan in March 1983 and this was upgraded to high commission in 1984 upon Brunei's full independence. For a detailed history of Australian representation in Brunei see List of high commissioners of Australia to Brunei.; Brunei has a high commission in Canberra.; Australian governor-general Quentin Bryce made a state visit to Brunei in October 2012. This was reciprocated by the sultan of Brunei in May 2013.; Bilateral trade in merchandise and services reached A$933 million in 2018, the main element being Australian imports of crude petroleum. Australia was Brunei's fourth largest export destination in 2018. Australian investments in Brunei totaled A$77 million and Brunei investments in Australia were valued at A$114 million. They are both party to the Agreement Establishing the ASEAN-Australia-New Zealand Free Trade Area (AANZFTA), and the Regional Comprehensive Economic Partnership (RCEP). They are also both signatories to the Comprehensive and Progressive Agreement for Trans-Pacific Partnership (CPTPP) and founding members of the Indo-Pacific Economic Framework (IPEF). |
| Cambodia | 15 January 1952 | See Australia–Cambodia relations: Australia has an embassy in Phnom Penh and Cambodia has an embassy in Canberra.; Diplomatic relations between Australia and Cambodia were established in 1952 with the appointment of an Australian Minister, resident in Saigon. An Australian legation was opened in Phnom Penh in 1955.; Diplomatic relations were raised to Ambassadorial level in 1959. Australia maintained relations with the Khmer Republic following the military coup of 1970. The Australian embassy closed in 1975 ahead of the fall of Phnom Penh to the Khmer Rouge on 17 April 1975. That day, Australia recognised the Royal Government of National Union of Kampuchea, soon replaced by the fully Khmer Rouge-controlled government of Democratic Kampuchea, but diplomatic relations were effectively suspended during the entire period of Khmer Rouge rule.; In solidarity with ASEAN countries, Australia did not recognise the People's Republic of Cambodia following the 1979 Vietnamese invasion, and continued to recognise the Democratic Kampuchea government-in-exile. However, it withdrew recognition on 14 February 1981 in response to information about the atrocities committed by the Khmer Rouge.; Australia played a leading role in the United Nations Transitional Authority in Cambodia in the early 1990s. In November 1991, Australia's diplomatic presence in Phnom Penh resumed with the appointment of a permanent representative to the Supreme National Council of Cambodia, upgraded in 1993 to Ambassador to the restored Royal Government of Cambodia.; Australia has been a substantial contributor to Cambodian development projects since the early 1990s. Cambodia and Australia signed a controversial refugee resettlement deal in September 2014.; There are over 66,000 people of Cambodian origin living in Australia (2016 Census). Cambodian refugees began arriving in Australia after the Khmer Rouge regime gained power in 1975, with numbers peaking in the 1980s. Approximately 6,000–7,000 Australians reside in Cambodia, most being dual Cambodian-Australian citizens or expatriates involved in development assistance work or business.; The two-way trade relationship is modest ($752 million in 2019) but has been growing quickly. Australia and Cambodia are parties to the ASEAN-Australia-New Zealand Free Trade Agreement. |
| China | 21 December 1972 | See Australia–China relations Gough Whitlam during his visit to China in 1973.: Australia and the People's Republic of China established formal diplomatic relations on 21 December 1972.; Australia has an embassy in Beijing and consulates-general in Chengdu, Guangzhou, Hong Kong, Shanghai and Shenyang.; China has an embassy in Canberra and consulates-general in Adelaide, Brisbane, Melbourne, Perth and Sydney. * Significant Chinese migration started in the middle of the nineteenth century and Chinese now form the second largest migrant community in Australia. The 2016 Australian census recorded 509,555 China-born people in Australia.; Prime Minister Gough Whitlam's 1973 diplomatic trip was the first visit to China by an Australian prime minister This was followed over the years by regular visits of China's Paramount leaders and premiers and Australia's governors-general and prime ministers as the relationship deepened. On two occasions, in 2003 and 2014, China's Paramount leaders have accepted rare invitations to address the Australian Parliament.; In 2014, the Australian prime minister and Chinese president agreed to describe the relationship as a "comprehensive strategic partnership" A China-Australia Free Trade Agreement (ChAFTA) entered into force in December 2015. China is Australia's largest two-way trading partner in goods and services. In 2020 Australia accounted for $53.5 billion (2.1%) of China's exports, ranking 13th among its top trade partners. Prior to travel restrictions imposed by the COVID-19 pandemic, Australia was a major destination for Chinese tourists and students.; Beginning in mid-2017, the relationship has significantly deteriorated. Points of friction include Australia's ban on Huawei's participation in the implementation of a 5G network on national security grounds; new Australian foreign investment and anti-espionage laws; Australian criticism of China in relation to its stance on the South China Sea dispute, the treatment of the Uyghurs in Xinjiang and changes in electoral and security laws in Hong Kong; a new defence pact between Australia and Japan and reactivation of the Quadrilateral Security Dialogue with the United States, Japan and India; Australia's lead in calling for an independent international investigation into the origins of COVID-19; and the formation of AUKUS in September 2021, under which the US and the UK will help Australia to acquire nuclear-powered submarines. By 2020 China had suspended all high-level diplomatic and trade dialogue channels and halted trade in a number of economically important sectors.; In July 2019, the UN ambassadors from 22 nations, including Australia, signed a joint letter to the UNHRC condemning China's human rights abuses of the Uyghurs as well as its mistreatment of other minority groups, urging the Chinese government to close the Xinjiang re-education camps.; In November 2020 the Chinese embassy in Australia released to the media a long list of grievances, which were promptly rejected by the Australian Government. Through 2021 and much of 2022, relations between the two countries remained tense. Following the election of the Albanese government in May 2022, leader and ministerial contacts restarted, and regular leaders' meetings under the Comprehensive Strategic Partnership have resumed from 2023.; Australians` trust in China has plunged. The 2021 Lowy Institute Poll, released in June 2021, found only 16 per cent of Australian respondents trusted China "a great deal" or "somewhat" to act responsibly in the world – a third of the number from 2018. |
| Georgia | 16 July 1992 | Australia recognised Georgia's independence and established diplomatic relations in 1992.; Australia's embassy in Turkey is accredited to Georgia. Georgia has an embassy in Canberra and an honorary consulate in Melbourne.; In 2008 Australia provided $1 million in humanitarian aid to Georgia in the aftermath of the Russo-Georgian War. Australia has supported Georgia's sovereignty and territorial integrity in international fora and does not recognise the breakaway republics of Abkhazia and South Ossetia established with Russian support.; There is a small community of Georgian-born people in Australia and modest trade relations. |
| India | 1941 | See Australia–India relations Australian PM Albanese along with Indian PM Modi during the 75 Years of Friendship through Cricket Event.: India established diplomatic relations with Australia in 1941, six years before its independence. The Australian Government subsequently supported the independence of India and Pakistan from the British Empire.; India and Australia share close historical ties, with both countries being former British colonies and members of the Commonwealth of Nations. They also share close sporting ties, with both countries sharing their passion for cricket. They also compete against each other in field hockey and in the Commonwealth Games.; Economic relations between the two nations is strong, with India being Australia's fourth largest export partner and the eighth largest trading partner.; In 1963 Australia provide defence aid to India in the face of Chinese action.; In 2009, relations were strained between the two nations by attacks on Indian students (termed Curry Bashings) in Melbourne. Police denied any racial motivation, but this was viewed differently by the Government of India leading to high-level meetings with Australian officials.; The persistent refusal of Australia to sell uranium to India due to the latter not being a signatory to the NPT has also hampered bilateral relations. However, this policy was reversed in 2011.; On 4 June 2020, India and Australia signed an agreement to provide access to one another's military bases, in order to help facilitate joint military exercises. Known as the Mutual Logistics Support Agreement, it allows each country to use the other's bases for the refuelling and maintenance of aircraft and naval vessels. The agreement was reached over a virtual summit between prime ministers Narendra Modi and Scott Morrison due to the COVID-19 pandemic.; PM Albanese attended the 75 Years of Friendship through Cricket Event hosted by PM Modi in March 2023 to celebrate 75 years of strong diplomatic and cricketing ties between the two nations. During this trip, Albanese visited New Delhi to attend the Australia-India Annual Leaders' Summit. During the visit, he also led a trade delegation, which included Trade Minister Don Farrell and Resources Minister Madeleine King, after the implementation of the Economic Cooperation and Trade Agreement (ECTA) between Australia and India on 29 December 2022.; Albanese attended the 2023 G20 New Delhi summit in India. |
| Indonesia | 17 March 1950 | See Australia–Indonesia relations: Bilateral relations between the two neighboring countries are among their most important.; Australia was supportive of Indonesian independence after World War II, particularly after giving de facto recognition to the Republican government of Indonesia on 9 July 1947, and subsequently advocated for it in the United Nations. Australia recognized the United States of Indonesia on 27 December 1949, immediately following the completion that day of transfer of sovereignty by the Netherlands. Diplomatic relations were formally established on 17 March 1950 and the Australian consulate-general in Jakarta was raised to an embassy. An Indonesian embassy was opened in Canberra in April 1950.; Australia maintains an embassy in Jakarta (see List of ambassadors of Australia to Indonesia) and consulates-general in Bali, Makassar and Surabaya.; Indonesia maintains an embassy in Canberra (see List of ambassadors of Indonesia to Australia), consulates-general in Melbourne, Perth and Sydney and a consulate in Darwin.; The relationship has gone through some strained periods, despite which both countries sought to avoid ruptures and Australia has maintained a significant development aid program since Indonesian independence.; Throughout the 1950s Australia did not recognize Indonesian claims to Western New Guinea though by the early 1960s it became reconciled to Indonesian administration and recognized the results of the controversial 1969 Act of Free Choice whereby Indonesia assumed full sovereignty over the territory. While in subsequent decades the Australian government has taken care to reassure Indonesia with regard to its full support for Indonesian territorial integrity, there continues to be an important constituency within Australia supporting Western New Guinea self-determination and the switch of Australian policy on East Timor remains a cautionary example for Indonesian politicians.; Australia vigorously supported Malaysia during the Indonesia-Malaysia confrontation during 1963–1966, contributing to the Commonwealth military forces supporting Malaysia.; Australia was suspicious of President Sukarno's flirtation with the Communist Party of Indonesia and relations stabilized and grew closer following President Suharto's rise to power in 1966 and adoption of a strong anti-communist stance.; Australia and Indonesia share the world's longest maritime boundary and are naturally close maritime partners. In 1971 and 1972, Australia and Indonesia agreed to maritime boundaries establishing the limits of their respective continental shelves.; The Whitlam government and Fraser government supported Indonesia's seizure of Portuguese Timor in 1975, and Australia granted de facto recognition in January 1978 and de jure recognition effectively by early 1979 when seabed boundary negotiations for the East Timor sector and Australian ministerial visits to the territory commenced. This was not formally confirmed until the mid 1980s under the Hawke government. The Timor Gap Zone of Co-operation Treaty was signed in December 1989. In late 1998, the Howard government advised Indonesia of a change in policy, advocating for a referendum in East Timor in which independence was an option. Public anger in Australia towards the Indonesian military and paramilitary violence in the province during the 1999 East Timorese crisis was followed by an Australian-led international peace-keeping force taking control of the territory in the lead up to formal independence.; Since the early 2000s the bilateral relationship has been on a stronger footing, despite the 2013 Australia–Indonesia spying scandal.; The 2004 Indian Ocean earthquake prompted a significant humanitarian response from Australia, including a A$1 billion aid package for Indonesia from the Australian federal government supplemented by over A$150 million in aid from state government and private contributions.; Australia's development partnership with Indonesia has continued and the annual budget in 2022–23 was $307.3 million. An A$200 million Australia-Indonesia Climate and Infrastructure Partnership was announced by Prime Minister Anthony Albanese following his visit to Jakarta in June 2022.; The Australia-Indonesia relationship was elevated to a Comprehensive Strategic Partnership in 2018. Regular high level dialogue is maintained through the Indonesia-Australia Annual Leaders' Meeting; Foreign and Defence Ministers' 2+2 Meeting; Ministerial Council on Law and Security; Economic, Trade and Investment Ministers' Meeting; Economic Policy Dialogue and the Ministerial Energy Dialogue. In February 2020 President Joko Widodo addressed the Australian Parliament during a state visit celebrating the 70th anniversary of diplomatic relations.; Security cooperation has been defined through a series of Australia–Indonesia Security Agreements, most significantly the Lombok Treaty signed in 2006. Australia and Indonesia work closely together to combat people smuggling and human trafficking, including by co-chairing the Bali Process on People Smuggling, Trafficking in Persons and Related Transnational Crime.; The Indonesia-Australia Comprehensive Economic Partnership Agreement (IA-CEPA) creates the framework to promote closer economic engagement between the two countries. In 2022 Australia's goods and services exports to Indonesia totaled A$14.6 billion and imports totaled A$8.7 billion including A$2.7 billion in Australian tourism earnings. In 2022 Australian investment in Indonesian stocks totaled just over A$3 billion, and Indonesian investment in Australian stocks totaled over A$800 million.; There are long-standing family, cultural, sporting education, and tourism connections between the two nations. At the end of June 2021, 89,480 Indonesian-born people were living in Australia (see Indonesian Australians). In 2022 almost 17,000 Indonesians were studying in Australia. The two countries are among the top destinations for tourism for each. |
| Iran | 21 September 1968 | See Australia–Iran relations: On 29 June 1968 Australia announced that it had agreed with Iran to establish diplomatic relations. An Australian embassy was established in Tehran with the first Australian ambassador presenting credentials on 21 September 1968. Iran has had an embassy in Canberra since 1971.; Governor-general Paul Hasluck attended the Iranian monarchy's 2500th anniversary celebrations in October 1971. The then Shah of Iran Mohammad Reza Pahlavi made a state visit to Australia in September 1974 to promote economic, scientific and political cooperation between the two countries. This was reciprocated in March 1975 by the visit of Australian governor-general John Kerr.; Diplomatic relations have been maintained without interruption through the Iranian Revolution of 1979 and the replacement of the monarchy with an Islamic republic.; Two-way trade has diminished in recent years but the value of Australia's two-way goods and services trade with Iran was $319 million in the 2019–20 financial year. Traditionally, Iran has been one of Australia's leading wheat export destinations, and other primary exports include wool and meat.; Australia, like most Western countries, has expressed concerns about Iran's human-rights record and its nuclear-weapons program. Although not a signatory to the agreement, Australia supports the objectives of the Joint Comprehensive Plan of Action. It continues to implement certain sanctions in respect of Iran, pursuant to UN Security Council resolution 2231 (2015) and Australia's autonomous sanctions regime.; Migration from Iran to Australia has mainly occurred since the early 1980s and particularly in the 21st century. The 2016 census recorded 58,112 Iran-born people in Australia, with most settled in New South Wales and Victoria. |
| Iraq | 2 December 1973 | Both countries established diplomatic relations on 2 December 1973: Australia and Iraq have had relations in various forms since 1938, but formal diplomatic relations were established in December 1973, with the accreditation of the Australian Ambassador in Beirut on a non-resident basis.; Australia opened an embassy in Baghdad in 1976 and Iraq established an embassy in Canberra in 1995. The Australian embassy closed in 1991 just prior to the start of the 1991 Gulf War. The Iraqi embassy closed in 2003 ahead of the US-led invasion. Both countries reopened their embassies in 2004. Iraq has a Consulate-General in Sydney and the Kurdish Regional Government retains a representative office, also in Sydney.; The relationship during the Saddam Hussein era was complex, particularly in the 1990s and early 2000s with Australian efforts to promote trading links competing, sometimes diametrically (see AWB oil-for-wheat scandal), with support for diplomatic and military actions against the Iraqi government. Australian participation in the 1991 Gulf War was followed by the Australian contribution to the 2003 invasion of Iraq as part of the United States-led coalition. Bilateral relations have improved significantly following the fall of Saddam Hussein in 2003.; Total merchandise trade between Australia and Iraq in 2018 – 2019 was over $201 million. Historically, Australia's primary commercial interest in Iraq has been wheat, which it has exported to Iraq for over 50 years.; Between 2003 and 2014, Australia provided $382 million in development and humanitarian assistance to Iraq to re-establish services to over 1.3 million people, including over half a million refugees and internally displaced people. This was in addition to $987 million in debt relief to support Iraq's transition to a stable and democratic nation after decades of war and dictatorship. Australia has worked in partnership with the Government of Iraq to improve the management of water, agriculture research, rural development, public sector governance, education, landmine clearance and basic services delivery.; Australia is contributing to capacity building missions with the Iraqi Army, law enforcement personnel, the Iraqi Counter-Terrorism Service and the NATO Training Mission headquarters in Iraq.; There is a sizeable Iraqi community in Australia. According to the Australian Bureau of Statistics Migration Australia data, at 23 October 2017, 67,355 people born in Iraq were living in Australia. The resettlement of Iraqis who have fled their home country remains a priority within Australia's offshore Humanitarian Programme.; In 2009 Nouri al-Maliki became the first Iraqi prime minister to visit Australia. He and then Australian prime minister Kevin Rudd signed a declaration to increase cooperation and to strengthen trade and investment ties.; In the post-Saddam era there have been frequent high level visits of Australian governors-general and prime ministers to Iraq, combined with visits to Australian Defence Force personnel stationed in the country. |
| Israel | 11 May 1949 | See Australia–Israel relations: Australia and Israel share a close relationship with significant people-to-people links and broad commercial engagement. Australia was the first country to vote in favour of the 1947 UN partition resolution, which ultimately led to the creation of Israel as a nation state.; The Australian Government formally recognised Israel on 28 January 1949. The Australian Legation in Tel Aviv, and the Israeli Legation in Canberra, were both opened in that year. Diplomatic relations were raised to ambassadorial level in 1960.; Australia is committed to a two-state solution in which Israel and a future Palestinian state co‑exist, in peace and security, within internationally recognised borders. In December 2018, Australia recognised West Jerusalem as the capital of Israel but this was reversed by the Albanese government in October 2022; The Australian-Jewish community, which numbers about 91,000 (2016 census), is an important element of Australia's relationship with Israel. There are approximately 10,000 Israeli-born people living in Australia and about 10–12,000 Australians living in Israel.; Australia and Israel have a growing bilateral economic relationship. In 2019–20, two-way goods and services trade amounted to approximately $1.3 billion. In February 2017, Australia and Israel signed a Technological Innovation Cooperation Agreement. Since 2017, Australia and Israel have expanded cooperation on national security, defence and cyber security.; Israeli president Chaim Herzog made the first visit by a serving Israeli president to Australia in November 1986. This was followed in 2005 and 2020 by presidents Moshe Katsav and Reuven Rivlin. In January 1987, Prime Minister Bob Hawke made the first visit to Israel by a serving Australian prime minister. This was followed by subsequent prime ministerial visits in 1995, 2000 and 2017. In February 2017, Benjamin Netanyahu became the first incumbent Israeli prime minister to visit Australia. |
| Japan | 14 September 1940 (broken from 8 December 1941 to 28 April 1952) | See Australia–Japan relations Australia-Japan relations are generally warm, substantial and driven by mutual interests, and have expanded beyond strong economic and commercial links to other spheres, including culture, tourism, defence and scientific cooperation.: Australia has an embassy in Tokyo and consulates-general in Fukuoka, Osaka and Sapporo.; Japan has an embassy in Canberra and consulates-general in Brisbane, Melbourne, Perth, Sydney and a consular office in Cairns. |
| Jordan | 28 April 1975 | Australia has an embassy in Amman, established in 1979 and Jordan has an embassy in Canberra, established in 1976.; Australia and Jordan have long standing friendly relations reflected in diverse political, cultural and economic links. His Majesty King Hussein made the first visit by an Arab Head of State to Australia in March 1976. His Majesty King Abdullah visited in November 2016. Australian governor-general Peter Cosgrove visited Jordan in October 2017. There have also been regular exchanges at senior ministerial level.; In 2019–20, two‑way goods and services trade was $285 million (A$198 million in exports to Jordan and A$86 million in imports from Jordan).; Since 2017, as part of Australia's response to the Syria crisis, it has provided over A$105 million in support of refugees and their host communities in Jordan. |
| Kazakhstan | 22 June 1992 | Australia recognised Kazakhstan's independence on 26 December 1991 upon the dissolution of the Union of Soviet Socialist Republics and established diplomatic relations the following year.; The Australian ambassador to Kazakhstan is accredited from Moscow. Australia opened an embassy in Almaty in 1995 but this closed in 1999 due to resource constraints. It has an honorary consulate in Almaty.; Kazakhstan is accredited to Australia from its embassy in Singapore. It has a consulate-general in Sydney, opened in 2015, and honorary consulates in Melbourne and Perth.; There have been a number of high level visits between the two countries to sign cooperation agreements: Prime Minister Sergey Tereshchenko visited Australia in 1993; Governor-general Bill Hayden visited Kazakhstan in 1993; President Nursultan Nazarbayev visited Australia in 1996. The countries signed an agreement on economic and commercial cooperation, which came into force on 2 June 2004.; Kazakhstan is Australia's leading trading partner in Central Asia, however, the level of trade remains modest. Two-way goods and services trade in 2020–21 was worth A$35.2 million. Australian investment in Kazakhstan totalled AUD131 million in 2021. |
| Kuwait | 1 July 1974 | Diplomatic relations between Australia and Kuwait were established in 1974 with the accreditation of the Australian ambassador in Riyadh on a non-resident basis. Australia opened an embassy in Kuwait City in December 2004.; Kuwait opened an embassy in Canberra in January 2002 and a Cultural Office in Canberra in 2008.; Australia supported Kuwait's independence and territorial integrity with its contribution to the coalition force which in 1991 liberated Kuwait from the Iraqi occupation.; Kuwait's investments in Australia are estimated at over A$13.4 billion (2019). Two-way trade amounted to A$664 million in 2019. Kuwait is a significant market for Australian exports of wheat and live sheep. It is also an important market for Australian education and tourism services. About 1,000 Australians reside in Kuwait, employed mainly in the education, banking, oil and gas and security industries.; In May 2016, the then Australian governor-general Peter Cosgrove made a state visit to Kuwait. |
| Kyrgyzstan | | Australia recognised Kyrgyzstan's independence on 26 December 1991 upon the dissolution of the Union of Soviet Socialist Republics and established diplomatic relations the following year.; Australia is represented in Kyrgyzstan by its embassy in Moscow.; Kyrgyzstan is represented in Australia by its embassy in Tokyo. The first Kyrgyz ambassador presented credentials in September 2021. |
| Laos | 15 January 1952 | Diplomatic relations between Australia and Laos were established in 1952 with the appointment of an Australian Minister, resident in Saigon. This is the longest unbroken diplomatic relationship Laos has with any country.; Australia has an embassy in Vientiane. This was established as a legation in December 1960. Relations were raised to full Ambassadorial level in January 1963. The embassy has remained open throughout the political changes in Laos, in particular the abolition of the monarchy and establishment of the Lao People's Democratic Republic in 1975.; Laos has an embassy in Canberra.; Australia is a long-standing development, trade and investment partner to Laos. In 2019–20 Australia provided $45 .3 million in total Official Development Assistance to Laos. This included $25 .6 million in bilateral funding. In February 2022, Australia committed to a substantial increase in assistance.; Two-way trade in goods and services was worth $13 9 million in 2019 -20. An agreement on the promotion and protection of investment between Australia and Laos has been in place since 1995. Australia and Laos are parties to the ASEAN-Australia-New Zealand Free Trade Agreement (AANZFTA). The Australian Chamber of Commerce in Laos (AustCham Lao) was established in 2005 – the first international chamber of commerce in the country.; At the time of the 2016 national census, more than 15,000 people in the Australian community identified as having Lao ancestry. Prior to the COVID-19 pandemic, Australia was a favored destination for Lao students studying abroad. |
| Lebanon | 20 February 1967 | Australia has an embassy in Beirut.; Lebanon has an embassy in Canberra.; 74,000 Lebanese-born people live in Australia, mainly in Sydney, and there are more people of Lebanese descent including Marie Bashir, Steve Bracks and Hazem El Masri.; Australia has a modest trade relationship with Lebanon and has also given foreign aid in the aftermath of the Lebanese civil war of 1975–1990. |
| Malaysia | 31 August 1957 | See Australia–Malaysia relations: Australia has a high commission in Kuala Lumpur.; Malaysia has a high commission in Canberra.; Both countries are full members of the Commonwealth of Nations.; Both Australia and Malaysia are members of the Five Power Defence Arrangements and often participate in military exercises together. |
| Maldives | 25 January 1974 | Australia and Maldives have a long-standing friendly relationship, with common membership of the Commonwealth of Nations and the Indian Ocean Rim Association.; Diplomatic relations were formalized in early 1974, with Australia's first non-resident ambassador presenting credentials on 17 February 1974. With Maldives joining the Commonwealth of Nations in 1983 and rejoining in 2020 after its withdrawal in 2016, the two countries representatives have been high commissioners.; Australia has a high commission in Malé, opened in 2023. This was part of a series of measures initiated in 2022 by the Morrison Government to enhance Australia's bilateral relations in the North-East Indian Ocean sub-region.; The Maldives high commissioner is accredited on a non-resident basis from Colombo. It has an honorary consulate-general in Melbourne.; Total bilateral trade was A$160 million in 2018, of which A$46 million was Australian merchandise exports, mainly food and beverage. Australia is also a development partner, supporting projects related to climate change, governance and maritime safety, and is a significant source of educational scholarships to Maldivian students. The total Australian Official Development Assistance to Maldives in 2019–20 had a budget of A$2.6 million. |
| Mongolia | 15 September 1972 | See Australia–Mongolia relations: Australia recognised Mongolia as independent from the Republic of China (Taiwan) in February 1967, despite Taiwanese objections.; Australia and Mongolia established formal diplomatic relations in 1972 as part of a broadening of Australian relations with Comecon countries in the early 1970s. Initially representation by both countries was on a non-resident basis.; Australia opened a consulate-general in Ulaanbaatar in March 2012, and this was upgraded to an embassy in December 2015. For a detailed history of Australian representation in Mongolia, see List of ambassadors of Australia to Mongolia.; Mongolia maintains an embassy in Canberra, opened in 2008, and honorary consulates in Melbourne, Perth and Sydney.; Relations have grown stronger in recent years with free-market reforms in Mongolia. The focus of the bilateral relationship has primarily been on education, development assistance and commercial activities in Mongolia's resources sector.; The governor-general of Australia Bill Hayden visited Mongolia in 1994, and the president of Mongolia Punsalmaagiin Ochirbat visited Australia in 1997. In February 2011, then-prime minister of Mongolia Sükhbaataryn Batbold became the first Mongolian head of government to visit Australia.; Bilateral trade between Australia and Mongolia is modest. Two-way merchandise trade totalled $45.2 million in 2019–20, with Australian exports accounting for the majority of trade ($43.2 million). |
| Myanmar | 1 August 1953 | Australia has an embassy in Rangoon.; Myanmar has an embassy in Canberra. |
| Nepal | 15 February 1960 | Australia has an embassy in Kathmandu, opened in 1984.; Nepal has an embassy in Canberra, opened in March 2007, and honorary consulates-general in Adelaide, Melbourne, Perth and Sydney.; Australia and Nepal have had a long-standing friendly bilateral relationship under both royal and republican Nepalese governments. King Mahendra of Nepal made a state visit to Australia in April 1971 and his son King Birendra made a state visit to Australia in September 1985. In February 1975 Australian governor-general John Kerr visited Nepal to attend the coronation of King Birendra of Nepal, one of the first overseas representational visits of its kind by any Australian governor-general outside the Commonwealth of Nations.; There is a large community of Nepalis in Australia. At the end of June 2020, 131,830 Nepalese−born people were living in Australia, and over 55,000 Nepali international students were studying in Australia in 2022.; Australia is a development partner and source of disaster-relief assistance to Nepal. In 2022–23, Australia is budgeted to provide an estimated A$26.6 million in official development assistance.; Bilateral trade totaled approximately A$2.34 billion in 2021, mostly Australian exports of educational services. |
| North Korea | 31 December 1974, broken 30 October 1975, Restored 8 May 2000 | See Australia–North Korea relations: Relations between the two countries have historically been either overtly hostile or limited and subject to periodic stress. Australia and North Korea were on opposite sides of the Cold War and Australia pursued a policy of non-recognition of the DPRK until 1974. Australia was one of 21 countries that supported South Korea during the Korean War in 1950 – 1953 (see Australia in the Korean War).; A brief opening of relations in the mid-1970s began with mutual recognition and the establishment of diplomatic relations in 1974. A DPRK embassy was opened in Canberra in December 1974 but it was summarily closed without notice in October 1975. An Australian embassy was opened in Pyongyang in April 1975, however it was expelled in early November 1975 shortly after the closure of the DPRK embassy. While reasons were never fully explained, it appears that North Korea took exception to Australian positions on UN votes on the Korean question around that time.; Diplomatic relations resumed in 2000 with the accreditation of Australia's ambassador in Beijing. The DPRK embassy was re-opened in Canberra in 2002 but closed again in 2009, ostensibly for budgetary reasons.; Since August 2008, the Australian ambassador in Seoul is accredited to North Korea.; North Korea's ambassador in Jakarta is accredited to Australia.; Despite the resumption in formal diplomatic relations, bilateral engagement has been effectively limited due to North Korea's nuclear weapons and ballistic missile programs and reports of significant human rights violations.; In 2003, in an event called the Pong Su incident, the North Korean ship Pong Su was discovered in Australian waters while its crew members were smuggling heroin. The ship attempted an escape and was taken over by the Australian commandos after a four-day chase.; As part of autonomous and multilateral sanctions, Australia has limited issuance of visas for North Korean citizens, North Korean ships have been banned from Australia's ports and Australian imports and exports to North Korea have been significantly limited.; On 22 April 2017, North Korea threatened Australia with a nuclear strike if it kept supporting US policies seeking to isolate the nation. |
| Oman | 1981 | The Australian ambassador in Riyadh is accredited to Oman on a non-resident basis. Australia has an honorary consulate in Muscat.; Oman established an embassy in Canberra in January 2024.; Australia and Oman cooperate closely in the Indian Ocean Rim Association (IORA).; Australia's two-way goods and services trade with Oman totalled $615.0 million in 2018–19. Australia's principle exports include meat, wheat and livestock. There are eight formal agreements between Australian and Omani universities to facilitate student and academic exchange, and research collaboration. The Sultan of Oman Endowed Chair in Arab and Islamic Studies was established in 2003 at the University of Melbourne. |
| Pakistan | 8 March 1948 | See Australia–Pakistan relations: Relations with Pakistan started before partition. Australia supported India and Pakistan's independence.; In 1960, Australia provided A£11 million in aid to Pakistan as part of the Indus Waters Treaty.; The relations between the two countries have been friendly, with former Pakistani president Pervez Musharraf having visited Australia in 2005 and the former prime minister of Australia, John Howard, also having extended a visit to Pakistan in 2005 as well, following the 2005 Kashmir earthquake which had immensely targeted the northern areas of Pakistan. He also announced 500 new scholarships for students in Pakistan to study in Australia. |
| Palestine | No diplomatic relations | Australia recognized Palestinian statehood on 21 September 2025.; Australia has a Representative Office in Ramallah, opened in September 2000, and the Palestinian Authority has a Representative Office in Canberra.; Palestinian migration to Australia has tended to reflect events in Israel and the Middle East. Migration waves occurred during the 1948 Arab-Israel War, 1967 Arab-Israel War and occupation of the West Bank and the Gaza Strip, and war in Lebanon in the 1970s and 1980s. Another wave of migration to Australia occurred following the 1991 Gulf War. The 2016 Australian census recorded 2,932 residents born in the West Bank and Gaza Strip. However, there is a larger diaspora of Palestinians born in Israel or in Arab countries in which they were born or first settled as refugees before migrating to Australia. Over 13,000 Australian residents identify themselves as having Palestinian ancestry. See also Palestinian Australians.; Australia provides development and humanitarian assistance to the West Bank and Gaza Strip. The Australian Government has budgeted an estimated A$27.1 million to the Palestinian Territories in 2022–23, of which A$10 million is allocated to UNRWA. |
| Philippines | 17 March 1950 | See Australia–Philippines relations: Australia and the Philippines have long-standing links dating back to the 19th century, including wartime alliance during World War II.; The Philippines government evacuated to Australia in March 1942 following the Japanese invasion. Before departing for the United States, President Manuel L. Quezon met with Prime Minister John Curtin and the Commonwealth War Advisory Council in Melbourne Australian military forces subsequently contributed to the liberation of the Philippines from Japanese occupation.; Australia established a consulate-general in Manila in May 1946, prior to the Philippines' independence from the United States. This was reciprocated by the Philippines in February 1948.; Formal diplomatic relations were established on 17 March 1950 when both countries raised their consulates-general to legations. Relations were raised to ambassadorial level on 6 December 1955.; Australia has an embassy in Manila.; Philippines has an embassy in Canberra, consulates general in Sydney and Melbourne, an honorary consulate general in Darwin and honorary consulates in Adelaide, Brisbane, Hobart and Perth.; There are regular official exchanges of leadership visits. Prime Minister Robert Menzies became the first Australian prime minister to make an official visit to the Philippines in April 1957, at which time he was given the honor to address a joint session of the Philippines Congress. President Ferdinand Marcos's visit to Australia in December 1967 to attend a memorial service for Harold Holt has been followed since by a number of Presidential visits to Australia. On 29 February 2024, President Bongbong Marcos became the first Philippine president to address a joint session of the Australian Parliament.; In September 2023, during the most recent official visit of Prime Minister Anthony Albanese, Australia and the Philippines elevated their longstanding relationship to a Strategic Partnership.; Since the 1970s a significant community of Philippines-born residents and their descendants has grown in Australia. Over 400,000 Australians have Filipino heritage. Australia is the number one destination for Filipino students studying abroad. In 2022, 17,976 Filipino students studied in Australia.; The two countries are important trade partners. In 2021–22, Australia's two-way trade with the Philippines was valued at A$8.2 billion.; The development cooperation partnership has a longstanding focus on education, peace and security, and disaster and climate resilience. In 2023–24 total overseas development assistance to the Philippines is estimated at A$89.9 million. Long term military ties were augmented in 2019 under an Enhanced Defence Cooperation Program. |
| Qatar | 1 May 1980 | Australia and Qatar established diplomatic relations on 1 May 1980.; Australia has an embassy in Doha, opened in November 2016. Prior to then the Australian ambassadors in Riyadh and later Abu Dhabi were accredited on a non-resident basis.; Qatar has an embassy in Canberra, opened in 2012. Prior to then the Qatari ambassador in Tokyo was accredited on a non-resident basis.; Prior to the COVID-19 pandemic, there were extensive aviation links between the countries, with Qatar serving as a major air route for Australians travelling to the Middle East and Europe. Qatar Airways provided daily direct flights between Doha and Melbourne, Perth, Sydney, Canberra and Adelaide. Around 3,000 Australians reside in Qatar and prior to the pandemic nearly 40,000 Australians visited Qatar annually.; The two countries are important trading and investment partners, with two-way goods and services trade worth A$2.1 billion in 2018. The Qatar Investment Authority and its subsidiaries have invested around $3 billion in Australia. A Memorandum of Understanding on Higher Education, Research and Vocational Training was signed in 2016, and significant research links have developed between Australian Universities and Qatari institutions. |
| Saudi Arabia | 15 January 1974 | Both countries established diplomatic relations on 15 January 1974 See Australia–Saudi Arabia relations: Saudi Arabia is one of Australia's most important trading partners in the Middle East; two-way trade was valued at $1.9 billion in 2011.; Australia has an embassy in Riyadh.; Saudi Arabia has an embassy in Canberra.; A large number of Saudi students choose to study in Australia, mostly under the King Abdullah Scholarship Program. In 2009, 12,500 Saudi students enrolled in Australian educational institutions.; Australians in Saudi Arabia are a sizeable community consisting mainly of up to 5,000 with the majority based in major commercial centres such as Riyadh and Jeddah.; A Memorandum of Understanding was signed in Canberra between Australia-Saudi Business Council; Official Press Agency stated on Apr,14,2015 that the Kingdom of Saudi Arabia and Australia are Discussing Developing Cooperation Ties; Bilateral relations between the Kingdom of Saudi Arabia and Australia have improved and progressed significantly in recent years and moved from normal relations to relations of mutual trust and partnership in various fields.; Saudi Arabia's Foreign Affairs statement on Australian-Saudi Arabian relations |
| Singapore | 18 August 1965 | See Australia–Singapore relations: Australia has a high commission in Singapore.; Singapore has a high commission in Canberra.; Both countries are full members of the Commonwealth of Nations.; Both Australia and Singapore are members of the Five Power Defence Arrangements and often participate in military exercises together. |
| South Korea | 30 October 1961 | See Australia–South Korea relations The establishment of diplomatic relations between the Republic of Korea and the Commonwealth of Australia began on 30 October 1961.: Australia and South Korea have great and good diplomatic relations.; Australian embassy in Seoul.; South Korean embassy in Canberra.; Korean consulate general in Sydney.; Korean consulate in Melbourne.; Korean consular office in Brisbane.; Both countries are a member state of the MIKTA.; Economic ties has been strengthened while trade value between the two reached $18 billion in 2007 Australia–Korea Free Trade Agreement (KAFTA). |
| Sri Lanka | 4 February 1948 | Bilateral relations are generally warm, supported by trade, investment flows, education, immigration and other development cooperations. Australia is also a member in helping the economic and social development of Sri Lanka.; In 2007 a two-way trade agreement was created between Australia and Sri Lanka valued at $232 million a year. The trade agreement includes exports from Australia such as vegetables and dairy products. Tea and other foods, textiles, clothing, rubber, iron and steel which are the main imports from Sri Lanka.; In 2008–09 the estimated budget for aid to Sri Lanka is $27 million.; Sri Lanka Country Brief |
| Syria | 1975 | See Australia–Syria relations: Australia and Syria established diplomatic relations in 1975 when the Australian ambassador in Lebanon was accredited concurrently as non-resident ambassador to Syria.; An Australian embassy was opened in Damascus in 1977. Syria opened an embassy in Canberra in the early 2000s. Until the start of the current Syrian Civil War in 2011, the two countries enjoyed good relations, supported by people-to-people links.; Since 2011, Australia has imposed autonomous sanctions in relation to Syria "to reflect Australia's grave concern at the Syrian regime's deeply disturbing and unacceptable use of violence against its people". In May 2012, in response to a civilian massacre in Houla, the Syrian chargé d'affaires and another diplomat based in Canberra were expelled, and Syria closed its embassy in June 2012.; There is currently no exchange of diplomats between the countries but Syria maintains an honorary consulate in Sydney.; The 2016 Australian census recorded 15,321 Syrian-born residents, including a wave of migrants arriving since 2011 under the Humanitarian Program.; In response to the ongoing crisis in Syria, Australia has provided about $525 million in humanitarian support since 2011, including the $249 million, four-year Syria Crisis Humanitarian and Resilience Package (2017–20). |
| Taiwan | 16 September 1941 – 22 December 1972 | See Australia–Taiwan relations: Australia does not have diplomatic relations with Taiwan, in conjunction with its recognition in December 1972 of the People's Republic of China (PRC) as the sole legitimate government of China.; Prior to that, Australia had recognised the government of the Republic of China, based on Taiwan since 1949.; The first Chinese Consul-General to Australia arrived in Melbourne in 1909, but it wasn't until 1921 that Australia established representation in China through a trade commissioner, an effort that was disbanded the following year.; Lin Sen, Chairman of the National Government of China and figurehead head of state, made the first visit by a Chinese head of state to Australia in 1931–32.; Formal diplomatic relations with the Republic of China date from 1941 with the first exchange of Ministers. The Australian legation was based in Chongqing and after the war in Nanjing. Relations were upgraded to Ambassadorial level in June 1948 but the embassy closed in October 1949 following the Communist victory.; Cold War fears of Communism characterized Australia's relations with China over the next two decades, with Australia refusing to recognise the Communist government of the PRC in Beijing, continuing to recognizing the Chiang Kai–shek administration on Taiwan as representing the Government of the Republic of China, and maintaining accreditation of a Republic of China embassy in Australia. However the Robert Menzies government was reluctant to open an embassy on Taiwan. This finally occurred under the Harold Holt government in 1966. The embassy in Taipei and the Republic of China embassy in Canberra were closed in early 1973 following Australia's switch of recognition to the PRC.; Nevertheless, Australia supports Taiwan's participation in international organisations and encourages private investment. An Australian Office in Taipei, dating from 1981, represents Australian interests in Taiwan.; Taiwan has four economic and cultural offices in Australia, in Brisbane, Canberra, Melbourne and Sydney.; Taiwan and Australia share a wide range of people-to-people links developed through business and tourism-related travel, academic exchanges, and Australia's Working Holiday Maker Scheme.; The two countries have a large trade relationship. Taiwan was Australia's 12th largest trading partner in 2020, worth $16.1 billion. Taiwan was Australia's ninth largest merchandise export market in 2020, worth $10 billion. |
| Tajikistan | | Australia recognised Tajikistan's independence on 26 December 1991 upon the dissolution of the Union of Soviet Socialist Republics and established diplomatic relations the following year.; Australia is represented in Tajikistan by its embassy in Moscow.; Tajikistan has not yet established representation to Australia. |
| Thailand | 19 December 1952 | See Australia–Thailand relations: Australia and Thailand have long standing friendly relations that go back to the early years of Australian nationhood. Official exchanges accelerated in the shadow of the Second World War. In November 1940, a Thai goodwill mission visited New South Wales, Victoria and Queensland. Prime Minister Robert Menzies visited Thailand in January 1941 on his way to Britain, meeting with the Thai prime minister.; Following the Japanese invasion on 8 December 1941 Thailand dropped its neutrality, entered into a military alliance with Japan and declared war on Britain and the United States in January 1942. Australia formally declared war on Thailand on 2 March 1942. The state of war ended on 1 January 1946 with an exchange of letters and a Peace Treaty was signed in Bangkok on 3 April 1946.; An Australian consulate-general was opened in Bangkok in September 1946. Diplomatic relations were formally established on 21 October 1951 with the raising of the consulate-general to a legation. The first Australian minister was appointed in April 1952. A Thai legation was subsequently opened in Canberra.; Diplomatic relations were raised to ambassadorial level on 6 December 1955.; Australia is represented through its embassy in Bangkok and a consulate-general in Phuket. For more detail on the history of Australian representation see List of ambassadors of Australia to Thailand.; Thailand is represented through its embassy in Canberra, a consulate-general in Sydney, honorary consulates-general in Adelaide and Perth and an honorary consulate in Melbourne.; During the Cold War Australia and Thailand were close allies and Australia was a significant development partner. Since 1957, when Prime Minister Menzies made his first post-war visit to Thailand, there have been regular high level political exchanges. His Majesty King Bhumibol Adulyadej's state visit to Australia in August–September 1962, was the first by a foreign reigning monarch. Governor-general David Hurley undertook a state visit to Thailand in February 2024.; On 13 November 2020, the Australian and Thai prime ministers signed a Joint Declaration elevating the Australia-Thailand bilateral relationship to a Strategic Partnership.; There is a significant Thai community in Australia. The 2016 Australian census recorded 66,229 Thailand-born residents.; Australia and Thailand enjoy a substantial commercial relationship, underpinned by the Thailand-Australia Free Trade Agreement (TAFTA). Two-way trade in goods and services was worth approximately $30.8 billion in 2022–23. |
| Timor-Leste | 20 May 2002 | See Australia–East Timor relations Protesters in Brisbane protesting Australia's claim on East Timorese oil, 1 May 2017: Australia and Timor-Leste are near neighbours with close political and trade ties. Timor-Leste, one of the poorest countries in Asia, lies about 610 kilometres (380 mi) northwest of the Australian city of Darwin and Australia has played a prominent role in the young republic's history. Despite earlier recognizing de jure the Indonesian incorporation of Portuguese Timor following its 1975 occupation, Australia was in the front-line of support for Timor-Leste's transition and led the military force that helped stabilise the country after it chose independence from Indonesia in 1999. Australia remains Timor-Leste's largest development and security partner.; Australia has an embassy in Dili.; Timor-Leste has an embassy in Canberra, consulates-general in Darwin and Sydney, and honorary consulates in Adelaide, Brisbane, Hobart, Melbourne and Perth.; There is a small Timorese diaspora in Australia, mainly from migration following the Indonesian occupation from 1975 onwards. The Australian 2016 Census recorded 9,238 Timor-Leste-born people in Australia.; The 2018 Maritime Boundary Treaty is an historic agreement between Australia and Timor-Leste to settle a long-running dispute over the sharing of rights over lucrative natural gas fields in the sea between the two countries. Prior negotiations and treaty agreements following Timor-Leste's independence had been contentious, exacerbated by the Australia–East Timor spying scandal and its aftermath which reflected poorly on successive Australian governments.; In 2019–20, two-way merchandise trade between Australia and Timor-Leste was worth $73 million, mostly Australian exports. Australia's main import from Timor-Leste is coffee.; There are regular high level political visits between the two countries. The most recent have been the visit of Australian governor-general David Hurley in May 2022 for the inauguration of President José Ramos-Horta and a visit to Australia by President Ramos-Horta in September 2022, during which a reciprocal Defence Cooperation Agreement was signed by the defence ministers of both countries. |
| Turkey | 28 February 1967 | See Australia–Turkey relations: Australia has an embassy in Ankara and a Consulates General in Istanbul and Çanakkale.; Turkey has an embassy in Canberra and Consulates General in Melbourne and Sydney.; Both countries are members of G20, MIKTA, OECD and WTO.; Trade volume between the two countries was US$1.66 billion in 2015 (Australia exports/imports: 544.8/521.6 million USD.; 150 thousand Turkish citizens reside in Australia.; Yunus Emre Institute has a local headquarters in Melbourne. |
| Turkmenistan | 14 May 1992 | Australia recognised Turkmenistan's independence on 26 December 1991 upon the dissolution of the Union of Soviet Socialist Republics and established diplomatic relations the following year.; Australia and Turkmenistan established diplomatic relations on 14 May 1992.; Australia is accredited to Turkmenistan from its embassy in Moscow.; Turkmenistan's first ambassador, resident in Tokyo, presented credentials on 12 March 2024. |
| United Arab Emirates | 16 March 1975 | See Australia–United Arab Emirates relations: Australia has an embassy in Abu Dhabi and a consulate in Dubai.; United Arab Emirates has an embassy in Canberra.; The UAE is Australia's largest Middle East trade and investment partner with A$9.3 billion in two-way goods and services trade in 2022. In 2022, UAE investment in Australia was estimated at A$12.6 billion. On 13 December 2023 Australia and the UAE announced the commencement of negotiations for a Comprehensive Economic Partnership Agreement – a bilateral free trade agreement – that will lay the groundwork for closer economic ties.; An estimated 15,000 Australians live and work in the UAE. Australia has become a popular educational destination for Emiratis. The majority of Emiratis residing in Australia are students pursuing education in various Australian universities; Prior to the COVID-19 pandemic restrictions, over 100 Emirates and Etihad flights per week operated between the UAE and Australia and since the end of the pandemic air connections have been building back.; The two countries enjoy good defence, aviation, security and law enforcement cooperation and Australia has maintained an Australian Defence Force logistic support base at Al Minhad Air Base.; There are regular meetings at senior level between the countries. Recent visits to the UAE by Australian governors-general include the official visits of David Hurley in January 2022, and May 2022 to present condolences on the death of UAE president His Highness Sheikh Khalifa bin Zayed Al Nahyan; and of Sam Mostyn to mark the 50th anniversary of diplomatic relations. |
| Uzbekistan | 26 December 1991 | Australia recognised Uzbekistan's independence on 26 December 1991 upon the dissolution of the Union of Soviet Socialist Republics and established diplomatic relations the following year.; Australia's ambassador accredited to Uzbekistan is resident in Moscow.; Uzbekistan's ambassador accredited to Australia is resident in Singapore.; Bilateral trade is modest. Two-way goods and services trade with Uzbekistan in 2020–21 was worth A$11.1 million. There is a small community of Uzbek-born residents in Australia. |
| Vietnam | 26 February 1973 (with Republic of Vietnam from 15 January 1952 to 5 May 1975) | See Australia–Vietnam relations: Australia has an embassy in Hanoi and a consulate general in Ho Chi Minh City.; Vietnam has an embassy in Canberra and consulates general in Sydney and Perth.; Australia's relations with Vietnam date from 1952 when a resident Australian Minister was appointed to the then State of Vietnam and a Vietnamese legation was opened in Canberra. After the Geneva Conference of 1954 the State, which became the Republic of Vietnam in 1955, controlled the southern part of Vietnam. In 1959 diplomatic relations with the Republic of Vietnam were raised to Ambassadorial level.; President of the Republic of Vietnam, Ngo Dinh Diem's 1957 visit was the first state visit to Australia by a foreign head of state.; Between 1962 and 1972, Australia committed almost 60,000 personnel, including ground troops, naval forces and air assets, and significant amounts of materiel to militarily support the Republic of Vietnam as part of a United States-led coalition (see Military history of Australia during the Vietnam War). The Australian Government of Gough Whitlam completed the withdrawal of Australian forces, begun in 1970, upon its election in December 1972.; On 26 February 1973 Australia concurrently recognised and established diplomatic relations with the then Democratic Republic of Vietnam, which controlled the northern part of Vietnam. The Australian embassy in Hanoi opened on 28 July 1973.; The Australian embassy in Saigon was closed on 25 April 1975, just ahead of the dissolution of the Republic of Vietnam government on 30 April 1975 following the capture that day of Saigon (renamed Ho Chi Minh City) by the People's Army of Vietnam and the Viet Cong.; Australia announced its recognition of the Provisional Revolutionary Government of the Republic of South Vietnam (PRG) on 6 May 1975. Diplomatic relations with the PRG were announced on 22 August 1975, with the Australian Ambassador in Hanoi accredited on a non-resident basis. On 22 January 1976 the Australian Ambassador presented his credentials in Ho Chi Minh City.; In July 1976 the northern and southern Vietnamese states formally merged as the Socialist Republic of Vietnam to which the Australian embassy in Hanoi remained accredited.; Australian representation in the south, in the form of the consulate-general in Ho Chi Minh City, was re-established in November 1994.; Since the end of the Vietnam War, the bilateral relationship between the two countries has become close. Australia and Vietnam have become important trading partners, development cooperation partners and defence and security partners. Australia's total two-way trade with Vietnam in 2019 was valued at $15.5 billion. Australia and Vietnam are parties to the ASEAN-Australia-New Zealand Free Trade Agreement (AANZFTA). In October 2010, Australia and Vietnam signed a bilateral Memorandum of Understanding on Defence Cooperation. In March 2018, Australia and Vietnam officially elevated relations by signing in Canberra a Joint Statement on the Establishment of a Strategic Partnership. During Vietnam prime minister Phạm Minh Chính's official visit to Australia in March 2024, the relationship was formally expanded to that of a Comprehensive Strategic Partnership.; Governor-general David Hurley made a state visit to Vietnam in April 2023 to mark the 50th anniversary of diplomatic relations with the then Democratic Republic of Vietnam.; There has been significant migration of Vietnamese people to Australia since the end of the Vietnam War, and there are around 295,000 people of Vietnamese descent living in Australia. Australia has been a popular destination for Vietnamese studying abroad and Vietnam has been a popular tourist destination for Australians. |
| Yemen | 20 December 1980 with Yemen Arab Republic (June 1984-22 May 1990 with People's Democratic Republic of Yemen) | Australia and the Yemen Arab Republic established diplomatic relations on 20 December 1980. Australia established diplomatic relations with the People's Democratic Republic of Yemen in 1984. Relations continued with the Republic of Yemen following unification of the northern and southern states in 1990.; The Australian ambassador is accredited from Riyadh and the Yemeni ambassador is accredited from Jakarta.; Australia maintains official relations with the internationally recognized government represented by the Presidential Leadership Council. It provided $14 million in humanitarian assistance to Yemen in 2022–23, bringing the total provided to Yemen to over $63 million since 2017. |

=== Europe ===
| Country | Formal relations began | Notes |
|---|---|---|
| Albania | 15 September 1984 | Albania opened an embassy in Canberra in 2020 and has honorary consulates in Adelaide and Brisbane. Australia's embassy in Rome is accredited to Albania; Albania's foreign minister Edmond Panariti visited Australia in August 2012, following on from a visit to Albania from Richard Marles, parliamentary secretary for foreign affairs.; There are approximately 11,000 people in Australia of Albanian descent.; In recent years, the Australian Government has provided financial and humanitarian assistance to Albania. |
| Andorra | 2 March 1995 | Australia and Andorra established diplomatic relations in 1995. Australia's first non-resident ambassador presented credentials in 1998.; Australia's ambassador is accredited from Madrid.; Andorra does not currently have representation to Australia. |
| Austria | 1952 | Australia has an embassy in Vienna.; Austria has an embassy in Canberra. |
| Belarus | 9 January 1992 | Australia recognised Belarus' independence on 26 December 1991 upon the dissolution of the Union of Soviet Socialist Republics and established diplomatic relations the following year, becoming the third country to do so.; Australia is accredited to Belarus from its embassy in Moscow, Russia.; Belarus operated a resident embassy in Canberra until budget cuts forced its closure in 2018. It is currently accredited to Australia from its embassy in Jakarta, Indonesia.; Bilateral trade in 2020–21 was valued at A$34.7 million, mostly Australian fertiliser imports. Since then Australia has imposed trade measures and targeted sanctions on Belarus, in response to its support for Russia's invasion on Ukraine. |
| Belgium | 1947 | See Australia–Belgium relations: Both countries have a growing bilateral commercial relationship, going back to World War One when they entered after Belgium was invaded by Germany.; They share similar approaches to many international issues, including arms control, whaling and Antarctica.; Trade and investment relations are very significant. In 2012, total Belgian investment in Australia was valued at A$6.4 billion, and Australian investment in Belgium totalled $2 billion. In 2012, Belgium was ranked as Australia's 24th largest merchandise trading partner.; Almost 30 Australia–Belgium bilateral treaties cover extradition, trade, taxation, and social security. |
| Bosnia and Herzegovina | 7 January 1993 | Australia recognised Bosnia and Herzegovina in 1992 and established diplomatic relations in 1994.; Australia has a consulate in Sarajevo, Bosnia and Herzegovina has an embassy in Canberra.; Australia has a continuing interest in efforts to maintain peace and build prosperity in Bosnia and Herzegovina. Since 1993–94, Australia has contributed humanitarian assistance worth over A$17 million to countries in the Balkans, including to Bosnia and Herzegovina. |
| Bulgaria | 5 April 1972 | Australia is represented in Bulgaria through its embassy in Athens (Greece). Australia has an honorary consulate in Sofia.; Bulgaria has an embassy in Canberra. |
| Croatia | 13 February 1992 | See Australia–Croatia relations Australia gave recognition of Croatia in January 1992: Australia has an embassy in Zagreb.; Croatia have an embassy in Canberra and consulates in Melbourne, Perth and Sydney.; Over 118,000 Australians are of Croatian descent, the largest of the former Yugoslav nations.; The two nations have signed a few bilateral agreements such as a social security agreement in May 2003 to give greater protection to people who have lived or worked in Australia and/or Croatia.; Bilateral trade is worth A$42 million. |
| Cyprus | 19 April 1973 | See Australia–Cyprus relations: Australia and Cyprus have enjoyed friendly relations as members of the Commonwealth of Nations since Cyprus' independence in 1960.; Australia and Cyprus formalize diplomatic relations in April 1973 with the accreditation of an Australian high commissioner on a non-resident basis.; Australia has a High Commission in Nicosia, opened in August 1975. For more detailed information on Australian representation in Cyprus see List of high commissioners of Australia to Cyprus.; Cyprus has High Commission in Canberra.; Australia recognises the Republic of Cyprus as the only legitimate authority on the island, and does not recognise the Turkish Republic of Northern Cyprus (TRNC). However TRNC maintains honorary representatives in Melbourne and Sydney. Australia, enjoying good relations with both Cyprus and Turkey, has played a role over the years to support negotiations for a settlement in accordance with UN resolutions. Former Australian foreign minister Alexander Downer was a UN special envoy from 2008 to 2014.; The United Nations Peacekeeping Force in Cyprus was Australia's longest peacekeeping mission. Australian peacekeepers, including Australian police personnel, served in Cyprus for 57 years, from 1964 to 2021.; Australia hosts the second largest Cypriot diaspora after the UK. Cypriot-born migrants and their families in Australia number over 80,000. Greek-Cypriots retain a numerical dominance within the Cyprus-born community. The largest Greek-Cypriot communities are in Sydney and Melbourne. Melbourne has the most Turkish-Cypriots.; In 2020, Australia's two-way goods and services trade with Cyprus was valued at $265 million, of which $232 million were imports from Cyprus. Major merchandise imports from Cyprus to Australia included cheese and curd; alcoholic beverages and medical products.; Cypriot president Dimitris Christofias made an official visit to Australia in 2011. |
| Czech Republic | 18 June 1972/1 January 1993 | Australia is represented in the Czech Republic through its embassy in Warsaw (Poland) and through an honorary consulate in Prague.; The Czech Republic has an embassy in Canberra, a consulate in Sydney and five honorary consulates (in Melbourne, Perth, Adelaide, Hobart and Brisbane).; There are around 21,000 people of Czech descent living in Australia.; The Czechoslovak 11th Infantry Battalion fought together with Australia during the Siege of Tobruk; A number of Australia–Czech Republic bilateral treaties have been agreed between the two countries, covering extradition, trade, nuclear energy and other matters.; Australian Department of Foreign Affairs and Trade about the relation with the Czech Republic |
| Denmark | 1947 | See Australia–Denmark relations: Australia has an embassy in Copenhagen.; Denmark has an embassy in Canberra. |
| Estonia | 21 November 1991 | See Australia–Estonia relations Sydney Estonian House, part of an extensive cultural network of the Estonian community in Australia. The first stage was opened in 1940, the first of its kind built by Estonians outside of Estonia.: In 1935 Estonia opened an honorary consulate in Sydney to promote trade and provide services to Estonians living in Australia. At that time about 2000 Estonians were estimated to be living in New South Wales.; Except for a brief period in 1974–75, Australia did not recognise the 1940 incorporation of Estonia into the Union of Soviet Socialist Republics. However, in October 1940, the Estonian government-in-exile directed the closure of the consulate.; Australia was among the first countries to recognise Estonia's restoration of independence on 27 August 1991. Both countries established diplomatic relations on 21 November 1991 with the accreditation of the Australian Ambassador in Stockholm on a non-resident basis.; Australia has an embassy in Tallinn. It is Australia's first 'Pop-up Embassy': the Ambassador to Estonia operates from an office in Tallinn during April and May. Outside this period, the Ambassador is based in Canberra but visits Tallinn a number of times a year, and maintains relations via phone, video conferencing, social media and websites. Australia also has ah honorary consulate in Tallinn.; Estonia is represented in Australia through its embassy in Canberra, established in 2016, and four honorary consulates, in Adelaide, Hobart, Perth and Brisbane.; Australia and Estonia have friendly relations, based on shared interests in promoting democracy, peace and free trade, and work closely in international fora on these subjects.; Australia is host to one of the largest communities of Estonians abroad. The 2016 census in Australia recorded over 9,500 people who identified as being of Estonian ancestry. People-to-people exchanges are also supported by a reciprocal working holiday visa scheme between the two countries.; Two-way merchandise trade between Australia and Estonia is modest, valued at $160 million in 2018.; President Kersti Kaljulaid visited Australia in October 2018 to attend the Invictus Games in Sydney. |
| Finland | 31 May 1949 | See Australia–Finland relations: Friendly relations between the two countries date back to Finland's independence. A Finnish consular presence was officially established in 1919. Wartime exigencies led to the breaking of consular relations in July 1941 and the subsequent declaration of war by Australia on 8 December 1941 in symbolic support of its then wartime ally, the Union of Soviet Socialist Republics. No shots were ever fired between the two countries and peace was restored under the Paris Peace Treaties, 1947, ratified by Australia in 1948.; Diplomatic relations were established with the appointment of the first Finnish Chargé d'affaires in July 1949. The Finnish legation opened in Sydney on 2 August 1949. Diplomatic relations were raised to ambassadorial level in 1968.; Australia is represented in Finland through its embassy in Stockholm, Sweden, and through an honorary consulate in Helsinki.; Finland has an embassy in Canberra, an honorary consulate-general in Melbourne and honorary consulates in Adelaide, Brisbane, Cairns, Darwin, Hobart, Perth and Sydney.; Finnish immigration to Australia has come in waves, particularly in the 1920s and 1950s, peaking by 1971. The 2016 Australian census recorded 7,711 Finland-born residents.; In 2021, Australia's two-way goods and services trade with Finland was valued at A$1.7 billion. The stock of Australian investment in Finland was valued at $4.4 billion in 2021, while Finnish investment in Australia was valued at $1.0 billion.; President Tarja Halonen visited Australia in 2007 and this was reciprocated by the state visit of Australian governor-general Sir Peter Cosgrove in 2016. Prime Minister Sanna Marin became the first Finnish prime minister to visit Australia in December 2022. |
| France | 1944 | See Australia–France relations France and Australia have a close relationship founded on historical contacts, shared values of democracy and human rights, substantial commercial links, and a keen interest in each other's culture.: Australia has an embassy in Paris and consulates-general in Nouméa and Papeete.; France has an embassy in Canberra and a consulate-general in Sydney. |
| Germany | 28 January 1952 with FRG (22 December 1972 – 3 October 1990 with GDR) | See Australia–Germany relations: Australia has an embassy in Berlin and a consulate-general in Frankfurt.; Germany has an embassy in Canberra. |
| Greece | 30 March 1953 | See Australia–Greece relations: Australia and Greece have a close bilateral relationship based on historical ties and the rich contribution of Greek Australians to Australian society.; Australia has an embassy in Athens.; Greece has an embassy in Canberra, consulates-general in Adelaide, Melbourne and Sydney, a consulate in Perth and honorary consulates in Darwin and Maitland.; Australia and Greece were Allies during WWI and WWII and Australian forces took part in the Battle of Greece and Battle of Crete in 1941. These are commemorated by the ANZAC Memorial Trail in Lemnos, and the Hellenic Memorial, Canberra.; Formal diplomatic relations were announced in October 1952 with the appointment of the first Greek minister to Australia who presented credentials on 30 March 1953. Diplomatic relations were raised to ambassadorial level in 1964 with the upgrade of the Australian consulate-general in Athens and the Greek legation in Australia to embassies. For a detailed history of Australian representation to Greece see List of ambassadors of Australia to Greece.; The first official visit to Greece by an Australian prime minister was by Robert Menzies in 1955. Since the 1980s there have been regular exchanges at head of state and government level. Presidents Konstantinos Karamanlis, Christos Sartzetakis and Konstantinos Stephanopoulos have made state visits in 1982, 1988 and 2002. The most recent Australian state visit was by Governor-general David Hurley in May 2023.; There is a large Greek community in Australia, established in the 19th century and expanded in waves particularly after WWI, WWII and the Greek Civil War. The 2021 Australian census recorded over 100,000 Greek-born residents and 424,750 residents of Greek descent. Greek immigrants and their descendants have made major contributions across a broad range of sectors in Australia – see Greek Australian.; Bilateral merchandise and services trade in 2021–22 was just over A$2.2 billion, a significant element being Greek export of tourism and transportation services. |
| Holy See | 24 March 1973 | The Holy See established an Apostolic Delegation in Sydney in 1914. Formal diplomatic relations were established with Australia under the Whitlam Government in March 1973 and an Apostolic Nunciature was established in Canberra. For more detailed information on the Holy See's representation in Australia see Apostolic Nunciature to Australia.; From 1973 to 2008, Australia maintained a non-resident ambassador, based in another European capital, as well as an office at the Holy See, headed by a Counsellor.; On 21 July 2008, the Australian Government announced that it would appoint for the first time a resident ambassador to the Holy See. According to the Australian Foreign Ministry, this marked a significant deepening of Australia's relations with the Vatican since it would allow Australia to expand dialogue with the Vatican in areas including human rights, political and religious freedom, inter-faith dialogue, food security, arms control, refugees and anti-people trafficking, and climate change. Mr Tim Fischer, a former deputy prime minister, presented credentials to Pope Benedict XVI on 12 February 2009. Since then Australia has continued to accredit a resident ambassador. For more detailed information on Australia's representation to the Holy See see List of ambassadors of Australia to the Holy See.; Pope Paul VI was the first pope to visit Australia in 1970. Pope John Paul II visited every state and territory in 1986 and Pope Benedict XVI visited Sydney in 2008 for that year's World Youth Day.; The Australian prime minister, Mr Rudd, visited the pope, Benedict XVI, and met the Vatican's secretary of state on 9 July 2009.; The secretary for relations with states Dominique Mamberti visited Australia in November 2014, the first such visit to Australia by a Vatican foreign minister. |
| Hungary | 6 April 1972 | Australia is accredited to Hungary via its embassy in Vienna, Austria, and closed its resident embassy in Budapest in 2013 due to budget constraints.; Hungary has an embassy in Canberra, a consulate general in Sydney and four honorary consulate (in Adelaide, Brisbane, Melbourne and Perth).; There are 67,000 people of Hungarian ancestry living in Australia, many Hungarian-Australians have been active in the fields of business, academia, politics and the arts such as Nick Greiner, Frank Lowy, Judy Cassab, and Les Murray; In recent years there have been several high-level visits to strengthen relations.; Australian Department of Foreign Affairs and Trade about relations with Hungary |
| Iceland | 17 April 1984 | Australia is accredited to Iceland from its embassy in Copenhagen, Denmark.; Iceland is accredited to Australia from its embassy in Beijing, China. |
| Ireland | 1 July 1946 | See Australia–Ireland relations: Australia and Ireland share a close historical relationship with strong cultural links between the two nations.; Australia has an embassy in Dublin.; Ireland has an embassy in Canberra, a consulate general in Sydney and an honorary consulate in Victoria, and both nations are former British colonies.; About 20% of the Australian population have Irish ancestry, which often predates Irish Independence in 1922.; Australia Department of Foreign Affairs and Trade about relations with Ireland |
| Italy | 1948 | See Australia–Italy relations: Australia has an embassy in Rome and a general consulate in Milan.; Italy has an embassy in Canberra and consulates-general in Melbourne and Sydney and honorary consulates in Newcastle, Adelaide, Brisbane and Perth.; Italy and Australia have for long years, sustained a muscular and positively friendly relationship in the categories of immigration, political strategism, and commercial trade.; There are around 850,000 people of Italian descent living in Australia.; Australian Department of Foreign Affairs and Trade about the relation with Italy |
| Kosovo | 21 May 2008 | See Australia–Kosovo relations: Australia recognised the Republic of Kosovo on 19 February 2008.; Australia's Ambassador to Kosovo is subordinate to the embassy in Vienna.; Kosovo has an embassy in Canberra. |
| Latvia | 27 August 1991 | See Australia–Latvia relations: Except for a brief period in 1974–75, Australia did not recognise the 1940 incorporation of Latvia into the Union of Soviet Socialist Republics. A Latvian honorary consulate which had opened in Melbourne prior to the Soviet incorporation continued operations throughout the period of occupation.; Australia recognised the restoration of Latvian independence and announced its intention to establish diplomatic relations on 27 August 1991. The Australian Ambassador in Copenhagen was subsequently accredited later that year. Currently the Australian Ambassador in Stockholm is accredited to Latvia and Australia has an honorary consul in Riga.; Latvia has established a resident embassy in Canberra in October 2021, having previously accredited its ambassador based in Tokyo. It also has honorary consulates in Adelaide, Brisbane, Melbourne, Perth and Sydney.; Australia and Latvia have friendly relations, based on shared interests in promoting democracy, peace and free trade, and work closely in international fora on these subjects.; There are also important people-to-people links between the two countries. Between 1947 and 1952, 19,700 Latvian refugees arrived in Australia having fled the Soviet re-occupation. The resident Australian population born in Latvia (2016 census) was 3,756 and Australian residents of Latvian descent numbered 20,514.; Australia's merchandise trade with Latvia in 2018 was $83.7 million. |
| Liechtenstein | 1999 | Australia and Liechtenstein formalized diplomatic relations in 1999 with the first accreditation on a non-resident basis of the Australian Ambassador in Berlin. Liechtenstein is represented in Australia through the Swiss embassy and consulates.; Australia and Liechtenstein work closely to fight modern slavery and human trafficking through the 'Liechtenstein Initiative: Finance Against Slavery and Trafficking'. The Initiative is a public-private partnership that focuses on the finance sector's role in ending modern slavery and human trafficking. Australia, Liechtenstein and the Netherlands are lead countries in the Initiative. |
| Lithuania | 6 November 1991 | See Australia–Lithuania relations: Except for a brief period in 1974–75, Australia did not recognise the 1940 incorporation of Lithuania into the Union of Soviet Socialist Republics. Australia recognised the restoration of Lithuanian independence and announced its intention to establish diplomatic relations on 27 August 1991. The Australian Ambassador in Copenhagen was subsequently accredited later that year. Currently the Australian Ambassador in Warsaw is accredited to Lithuania and Australia has an honorary consul in Vilnius.; Lithuania established a resident embassy in Canberra in 2020, having previously accredited its ambassador based in Tokyo. It also has honorary consulates in Sydney, Melbourne and Adelaide.; Australia and Lithuania have friendly relations, based on shared interests in promoting democracy, peace and free trade, and work closely in international fora on these subjects. President Gitanas Nauseda made a state visit to Australia in October 2023.; There are also important people-to-people links between the two countries. Approximately 10,000 Lithuanians migrated to Australia, mainly between 1947 and 1953, as refugees fleeing the Soviet re-occupation of Lithuania. They and their descendants have integrated into Australian society but retain cultural and family links with Lithuania. The resident Australian population born in Lithuania (2016 census) was 2,607 and Australian residents of Lithuanian descent numbered 16,292. According to unofficial estimates by the Lithuanian community, however, the actual number could be over 50,000 people.; In 2019, Australia's two-way goods and services trade with Lithuania was valued at $145 million. |
| Luxembourg | 18 September 1970 | See Australia–Luxembourg relations: Australia and Luxembourg formalized diplomatic relations in September 1970 with the first appointment of Australia's ambassador in Brussels as non-resident ambassador to Luxembourg. The first ambassador presented credentials on 13 October 1970. Since then Australia has remained represented in Luxembourg through its embassy in Brussels.; Luxembourg is represented in Australia through the embassy of the Netherlands in Canberra and through honorary consulates in Sydney and Melbourne.; Trade and investment figure strongly in the bilateral relationship and ministerial visits between the countries have focused on this. Luxembourg ranks as Australia's seventh largest investor (stocks) at A$93 billion in 2021, with Foreign Direct Investments (stocks) of $10 billion in Australia. Two-way goods and services trade in 2020 was valued at A$185 million. There is a reciprocal working holiday visa scheme between the two countries. |
| Malta | 21 September 1964 | See Australia–Malta relations: Australia has a High Commission in Valletta.; Malta has a High Commission in Canberra, two consulates-general (in Melbourne and Sydney), and four honorary consulates (in Adelaide, Ascot Vale, Melbourne and Perth).; Australia Department of Foreign Affairs and Trade about relations with Malta |
| Moldova | 1 April 1992 | Australia recognised Moldova's independence on 26 December 1991 upon the dissolution of the Union of Soviet Socialist Republics and established diplomatic relations the following year.; Australia is represented in Moldova by its embassy in Moscow.; Moldova has not yet established representation to Australia. |
| Monaco | 3 May 2007 | Consular relations between Australia and Monaco date back to August 1959 when Monaco's first honorary consul in Australia was appointed.; Diplomatic relations between Australia and Monaco were formalized in May 2007 when Australia's first non-resident ambassador presented credentials. Monaco appointed its first non-resident ambassador in September 2007.; Australia's ambassador is accredited from Paris.; Monaco's ambassador to Australia is accredited from its Ministry of Foreign Affairs. It has an honorary consulate-general in Melbourne.; Princess Charlene, Princess Consort of Monaco, visited Australia in 2012 to inaugurate an exhibition on Princess Grace in Bendigo, Victoria. |
| Montenegro | 1 September 2006 | See Australia–Montenegro relations: Australia recognised the Republic of Montenegro on 27 June 2006.; Australia is represented in Montenegro through a non-resident ambassador based in the Australian embassy in Belgrade (Serbia).; Australia Department of Foreign Affairs and Trade about relations with Montenegro |
| Netherlands | 18 March 1942 | See Australia–Netherlands relations: Australia has an embassy in The Hague; The Netherlands has an embassy in Canberra. |
| North Macedonia | 20 October 1995 | See Australia–North Macedonia relations: Both countries established diplomatic relations on 15 February 1994.; Australia is represented in North Macedonia by its embassy in Belgrade, Serbia and an honorary consulate in Skopje.; North Macedonia has an embassy in Canberra. |
| Norway | 23 June 1947 | See Australia–Norway relations: Australia has an honorary consulate in Oslo, and is represented in Norway through its embassy in Copenhagen (Denmark).; Norway has an embassy in Canberra. |
| Poland | 20 February 1972 | See Australia–Poland relations The Polish Dozynki Festival in Adelaide, Australia. Australia has a large community of residents of Polish birth or descent who maintain cultural links with Poland.: Australia has an embassy in Warsaw.; Poland has an embassy in Canberra and a consulate-general in Sydney. It also has an honorary consulate-general in Melbourne and honorary consulates in Adelaide, Brisbane, Hobart and Perth.; Poland established consulates in Sydney in 1919 and Melbourne in 1931.; During the Second World War, the two countries were wartime allies. Australian and Polish forces fought alongside each other in the Siege of Tobruk in 1941, and a number of Australian aircrews flew in support of the Warsaw Uprising in 1944. In 1943–1944, during the rupture of relations between the Polish government-in-exile and the Union of Soviet Socialist Republics, Australia served as the protecting power for Poland in the Soviet Union, the first time it had played this diplomatic role.; Following the establishment of a post-war Communist government in Poland, official relations were more limited. Diplomatic relations were formally established in February 1972. After a brief period of non-resident accreditation from the embassy in Moscow, an Australian resident embassy was opened in Warsaw in 1973.; Over 45,000 Australian residents are Polish-born and 184,000 people of Polish ancestry live in Australia. The Polish community is active in promoting people-to-people contact and commercial, cultural and academic ties through various community organisations, bilateral business councils and institutes. In 2014 Poland and Australia signed a Memorandum on a bilateral Work and Holiday Maker Visa Arrangement.; Australia's two-way goods and services trade with Poland was valued at nearly A$2.0 billion in 2019, dominated by merchandise imports from Poland. Australian investment in Poland is valued at around A$1.2 billion.; In August 2018 President Andrzej Duda made the first ever official visit of a Polish president to Australia. President Aleksander Kwaśniewski had earlier paid a visit to Australia to attend the opening ceremony of the 2000 Summer Olympics being held in Sydney.; Australian governor-general David Hurley paid an official visit to Poland in August 2022 to celebrate the 50th anniversary of diplomatic relations. |
| Portugal | 15 August 1960 | Formal diplomatic relations between Australia and Portugal were announced on 15 August 1960.; Australia has an embassy in Lisbon. For a detailed history of Australian representation in Portugal see List of ambassadors of Australia to Portugal.; Portugal has an embassy in Canberra and a consulate-general in Sydney. It also has honorary consulates in Adelaide, Brisbane, Darwin, Melbourne and Perth.; With the end of World War II and the return of Portuguese authority to its territory in Timor, the Australian Government established a consulate in Dili, commencing operations on 1 January 1946. Following the establishment of an Australian Embassy in Lisbon in 1970, the consulate was closed in 1971.; The two countries disagreed on East Timor during the period of Indonesian occupation and incorporation of the former Portuguese territory but today work closely in ensuring stability there and giving foreign aid.; According to the 2016 census, 61,886 Australians claim Portuguese ancestry while 15,804 are Portuguese-born. Australia and Portugal signed a work and holiday visa arrangement in September 2014.; The global economic crisis and the associated downturn in the Portuguese economy had a dramatic impact on Australian merchandise exports to Portugal, which more than halved to around A$16.6 million by 2016 but have since risen to A$59 million in 2020. On the other hand, Portuguese exports to Australia have grown in recent years, with merchandise exports totaling A$318 million in 2020.; President Aníbal Cavaco Silva visited Australia in 2012. |
| Romania | 18 March 1968 | See Australia–Romania relations: Australia has a non-resident ambassador in its embassy in Athens (Greece), and has a consulate general in Bucharest.; Romania has an embassy in Canberra and a general consulate in Melbourne and Sydney.; Romania and Australia have concluded an Investment Promotion and Protection Agreement, signed in 1994, a Trade and Economic Agreement (signed with full effect for Australia in July 2002 and for Romania in January 2003) and an Agreement for the Avoidance of Double Taxation and the Prevention of Fiscal Evasion, signed in 2001. |
| Russia | 10 October 1942,(broken from 23 April 1954 to 16 March 1959) | See Australia–Russia relations: The first Australian embassy in Moscow opened in 1943.; Australia has an embassy in Moscow and two honorary consulates (in Saint Petersburg and Vladivostok).; Russia has an embassy in Canberra and a consulate-general in Sydney.; Australian Department of Foreign Affaires and Trade about the relation with Russia |
| San Marino | 13 September 1995 | Australia and San Marino formalized diplomatic relations with the non-resident accreditation of an Australian ambassador, based in Rome.; San Marino has honorary consulates in Sydney and Perth.; A reciprocal Working Holiday Maker visa program between Australia and San Marino took effect on 1 January 2017. |
| Serbia | 26 April 1966 | See Australia–Serbia relations: Australia has an embassy in Belgrade.; Serbia has an embassy in Canberra and a consulate-general in Sydney.; The European office of the Australian Federal Police is located in Belgrade as of 2003.; In the 2006 Australian Census, 95,364 people identified themselves as having Serbian origin. |
| Slovakia | 1 January 1993 | Australia's embassy in Vienna is accredited to Slovakia.; Slovakia maintained an embassy in Canberra for many years but this was closed in 2024. Representation is maintained through a consulate-general in Sydney and honorary consulates in Brisbane, Melbourne and Perth.; Two-way trade between the countries stands at $115 million.; There are approximately 10,000 people of Slovak origin living in Australia. |
| Slovenia | 5 February 1992 | Australia recognised Slovenia as an independent state on 16 January 1992.; Australia is represented in Slovenian through its embassy in Vienna, Austria, and through an honorary consulate in Ljubljana.; Slovenia has an embassy in Canberra and an honorary consulate in Camperdown, New South Wales.; There are between 20,000 and 25,000 Slovenians who live in Australia.; Australian Department of Foreign Affairs and Trade about relations with Slovenia |
| Spain | 26 October 1967 | See Australia–Spain relations: Australia has an embassy in Madrid.; Spain has an embassy in Canberra and consulates-general in Melbourne and Sydney. |
| Sweden | 26 September 1947 | See Australia–Sweden relations: Australia and Sweden have a long-standing friendly relationship with migration and trading links extending back to the nineteenth century. In 1851 the first Swedish-Norwegian Consuls were appointed in Sydney, Melbourne and Port Adelaide. The first Swedish Consul-General was appointed in 1906.; Formal diplomatic relations were established in 1947 with the opening of a Swedish legation in Sydney, which moved in 1951 to Canberra. An Australian legation was established in Stockholm in 1961, and diplomatic relations were raised to ambassadorial level in 1963. For a detailed history of Australian diplomatic representation in Sweden see List of ambassadors of Australia to Sweden.; Australia has an embassy in Stockholm.; Sweden has an embassy in Canberra, an honorary consulate-general in Sydney and honorary consulates in Adelaide, Brisbane, Cairns, Darwin, Hobart, Melbourne and Perth.; The two governments cooperate closely in multilateral organizations. King Carl XVI Gustaf made state visits to Australia in 1982 and 2005.; There were 46,669 Australian residents of Swedish descent and 10,847 born in Sweden according to the 2021 Australian census. There has been a working holiday visa agreement in place since 2001.; Australia and Sweden are important trading partners. In 2021, two-way goods and services trade was valued at A$3.4 billion, the stock of Australian investment in Sweden was valued at A$15.0 billion and Swedish investment in Australia was valued at A$10.2 billion. |
| Switzerland | 2 June 1961 | See Australia–Switzerland relations: Switzerland opened a consulate in Sydney in 1855 and one in Melbourne in 1856.; Australia has an embassy in Bern and a consulate-general in Geneva.; Switzerland has an embassy in Canberra, a consulate-general in Sydney and six honorary consulates in Adelaide, Brisbane, Darwin, Hobart, Melbourne and Perth.; Australian Department of Foreign Affairs and Trade about relations with Switzerland; Swiss Federal Department of Foreign Affairs about relations with Australia |
| Ukraine | 10 January 1992 | See Australia–Ukraine relations The Sydney Opera House is lit in the Ukrainian national colours in solidarity with Ukraine in the face of Russian aggression, 4 March 2022.: Australia recognised Ukraine's independence on 26 December 1991 upon the dissolution of the Union of Soviet Socialist Republics and established diplomatic relations early the following year.; Ukraine opened an embassy in Canberra in March 2003.; Australia opened an embassy in Kyiv in November 2014. Following the Russian attack in February 2022, it has been temporarily relocated to Poland.; The 2016 Census recorded 13,366 Ukrainian-born persons in Australia. Most Ukrainian migrants to Australia arrived in the post-World War II period. The small but active Ukrainian community in Australia plays an important role in developing bilateral relations. In 2002 the Australian Federation of Ukrainian Organisations helped establish Ukrainian-Australian House in Kyiv to promote commercial ties.; Petro Poroshenko made the first visit to Australia by a Ukrainian president in 2014.; On 1 April 2016, Australia and Ukraine signed a Nuclear Cooperation Agreement, enabling Australia to export uranium to Ukraine – one of the world's top ten generators of nuclear power. This agreement entered into force in June 2017. The Agreement allows Australia to help Ukraine diversify its energy supply, and enhances bilateral cooperation between Australia and Ukraine on nuclear-related activities, including nuclear safeguards, security, safety and science.; Prior to the 2022 Russian attack on Ukraine, bilateral trade had been modest – in 2021–2022 two-way goods and services trade was valued at A$243 million.; Australia has been a vigorous supporter of Ukraine's sovereignty and territorial integrity since the start of the Russo-Ukrainian War in 2014 and particularly since its escalation in February 2022 – see Russian invasion of Ukraine (2022–present). Australia is contributing important defence, economic and humanitarian assistance to Ukraine, and has imposed sanctions on Russian and Belarusian individuals and organisations connected with Russian aggression.; President Volodymyr Zelenskyy addressed the Australian Parliament by video on 31 March 2022. Prime Minister Anthony Albanese visited Kyiv on 3 July 2022, to meet with President Zelenskyy and show support to Ukraine. |
| United Kingdom | | See Australia–United Kingdom relations Australia House, which houses the High Commission of Australia, London was opened on August 3, 1918.: British-Australian relations are close, marked by shared history, culture, institutions and language, extensive people-to-people links, aligned security interests, and substantial trade and investment cooperation.; Australia has a high commission in London, established in 1909. It is Australia's oldest diplomatic mission. For a detailed history of Australia's representation in the United Kingdom see List of high commissioners of Australia to the United Kingdom.; The United Kingdom has a high commission in Canberra, established in 1936, making it the oldest diplomatic mission in the capital, and consulates-general in Brisbane, Melbourne, Perth and Sydney and honorary consulates in Adelaide, Alice Springs, Cairns and Hobart. For a detailed history of British representation in Australia see List of high commissioners of the United Kingdom to Australia.; Modern-day Australia was established in 1901 from a federation of the six British colonies in Australia. Upon federation, Australia became a Dominion of the British Empire. Formal adoption by Australia in 1942 of the Statute of Westminster 1931 confirmed its full autonomy from the United Kingdom, including in the conduct of its foreign relations. The promulgation of the Australia Act 1986 by both Australian and British Parliaments effectively eliminated any residual constitutional links between the two countries, though they continue to share the same monarch.; World War II and Australia's subsequent ANZUS military alliance with the United States, the evolution of the British Empire into the Commonwealth of Nations, and the trade reorientation of the United Kingdom away from the Commonwealth towards Europe upon joining the European Economic Community in 1973 gradually transformed the Australia-UK bilateral relationship over the second half of the 20th century.; British-born people have been the largest overseas-born group in Australia since British colonization began in 1788 and the United Kingdom remains a top three source country of migrants to Australia. The 2016 Australian census identified 1,087,759 United Kingdom-born people in Australia. There is significant visitor exchange, with 718,600 UK visitors to Australia and 667 800 Australian visitors in the UK as of June 2019. Right of British citizenship or abode for descendants of British migrants, and a reciprocal working holiday scheme, makes the United Kingdom a popular destination for Australians living overseas.; Australia excels in many sports that originate in the UK, and the two countries enjoy a close sporting rivalry.; Annual Australia-UK Ministerial Consultations (AUKMIN) are the premier bilateral fora on foreign policy, defence and security issues.; The UK is the second largest source of foreign investment in Australia, with the stock of investment valued at A$574.8 billion in 2018. Australian investment in the UK was A$408 billion in 2018. The UK is Australia's 8th largest two-way trading partner, worth A$26.9 billion in 2018, and its third largest services trading partner, with Australian services exports to the UK of A$5.5 billion and imports of A$9.2 billion in 2018. The Australia–United Kingdom Free Trade Agreement, signed in December 2021 was the first trade agreement signed by Britain since leaving the European Union that was negotiated completely anew. Australia supports Britain's accession to the Comprehensive and Progressive Agreement for Trans-Pacific Partnership.; The Australia-UK Defence and Security Cooperation Treaty signed in 2013 consolidates various elements of long-standing military/defence cooperation. Australia and the UK are signatories of the Five Power Defence Arrangements (FPDA), a series of bilateral defence relationships established by multi-lateral agreements between Australia, Malaysia, New Zealand, Singapore, and the United Kingdom. Both countries are members of the Five Eyes intelligence-sharing alliance. The AUKUS trilateral security partnership announced in 2021 deepens the Australia-UK defence partnership.; In 2006, Prime Minister Tony Blair became the first British head of government to address the Australian Parliament. |

=== Oceania ===
Australia is a member of the Pacific Islands Forum and other regional organisations. As part of its Pacific Step-Up initiative announced in 2016 Australia has uniquely established resident High Commissions and embassies in all independent and self governing members of the Pacific Islands Forum as well as consulates-general in New Caledonia and French Polynesia. Australia provides aid to many of its developing Pacific Islands neighbours, and to Papua New Guinea. For decades, it has been the largest donor of aid to the Oceania region. China and New Zealand, the next biggest donors, donated only one sixth of Australia's aid during the 2010s.

Since the end of the Cold War, the understanding from the United States has been that Australia and New Zealand would assume responsibility for the security of much of the Oceania region, whom they already share pre-existing cultural and economic ties to.

Australia's approach to the Pacific has included frequent references to what it has perceived as an "Arc of Instability" among its island neighbours. In August 2006 Australian defence minister Brendan Nelson stated to the Australian Parliament:

We cannot afford to have failing states in our region. The so-called 'arc of instability', which basically goes from East Timor through to the south-west Pacific states, means that not only does Australia have a responsibility in preventing and indeed assisting with humanitarian and disaster relief, but also that we cannot allow any of these countries to become havens for transnational crime, nor indeed havens for terrorism.

As from early 2008, the Australian government led by Kevin Rudd began what it called a "new approach" to relations between Australia and the Pacific, appointing a Parliamentary Secretary for Pacific Island Affairs, Duncan Kerr. In February, Kerr and fellow Parliamentary Secretary for Foreign Affairs, Bob McMullan visited Samoa, Tonga and Kiribati in February, and stated:

Broadly, the approach is one of much more partnership and engagement on the basis of mutual respect. We're not going to be lecturing or hectoring, we're going to try and work together with them and I think we set a pretty good standard with the way we started. The relationships we've established with ministers and leaders in those countries [Kiribati, Tonga and Samoa] is very positive.

Richard Marles, the deputy leader of the Australian Labor Party, has strongly advocated for Australia to prioritize its role in the Pacific. In 2021, he wrote a book titled Tides that bind: Australia in the Pacific, and claimed in an interview that, "By any measure, we are huge part of the Pacific. We're the largest donor into the Pacific, we've got the biggest diplomatic footprint in the Pacific, we've got the most development resources in the Pacific of any country. For most of the Pacific, we're the most important bilateral relationship they have, more important than the United States, more important than China."

| Country | Formal relations began | Notes |
|---|---|---|
| Cook Islands | 1994 | See Australia–Cook Islands relations: Australia and the Cook Islands established diplomatic relations in 1994, with the Australian high commissioner resident in Wellington, New Zealand.; Australia has a high commission in Rarotonga, opened in December 2019. For a detailed history of Australian accreditation to the Cook Islands see List of high commissioners of Australia to the Cook Islands.; Although the Cook Islands maintained a resident high commission in Canberra for some years in the 1990s, at present it has no diplomatic representation to Australia.; Australia's relationship with the Cook Islands focuses on shared membership of regional organisations, trade and investment, people-to-people links and security cooperation. The 2016 census records that a diaspora of at least 22,000 Cook Islands citizens live in Australia, including in Melbourne, Sydney and Perth.; There have been regular exchanges of ministerial visits. Prime Minister Henry Puna made an official visit to Australia in November 2019. Governor-general David Hurley made an official visit to the Cook Islands in June 2023. |
| Fiji | 10 October 1970 | See Australia–Fiji relations: Australia and Fiji established diplomatic relations upon Fiji's independence in 1970.; Australia has had a high commission in Suva since independence. Prior to that Australia was represented in Fiji by a commission opened in 1963. For a detailed history of Australia's accreditation to Fiji see List of high commissioners of Australia to Fiji.; Fiji has a high commission in Canberra, a consulate-general in Sydney and honorary consulates in Brisbane and Melbourne.; Australia and Fiji have extensive people-to-people links. Over 3,000 Australian companies do business in Fiji and 61,000 people born in Fiji live in Australia. Fiji participates in Australia's Pacific Labour Mobility program. Fiji is also one of the top tourist destinations for Australians. Australia is one of Fiji's largest trade and investment partners. Two-way goods and services trade has been steadily increasing year-on-year, totaling $2.47 billion in 2019. Australian investment in Fiji, valued at approximately $1.34 billion in 2018, is focused on tourism, the financial sector and manufacturing. Fiji's investment in Australia was valued at $346 million in 2018.; Relations have been periodically strained as a result of the 1987, 2000 and 2006 coups in Fiji, which led to Australian government condemnations, sanctioning of post-coup Fijian governments and insistence on swift restoration of human rights and democracy. In November 2009 the Fijian government of Prime Minister Frank Bainimarama expelled the Australian and New Zealand high commissioners, accusing them of interference in Fijian affairs and Australia reciprocated, leading to a freeze in diplomatic relations until 2012. A new Australian high commissioner took up residence in 2014 with Fiji's return to the Commonwealth of Nations. Relations improved thereafter with Fiji's return to democracy.; Australian prime minister Scott Morrison visited Fiji in September 2019, during which he signed with Fijian prime minister Frank Bainimarama the 'Fiji-Australia Vuvale Partnership'. The Partnership commits to deeper security, economic and people-to-people links between both countries and for both governments to strengthen bilateral political cooperation. A renewed and elevated version of the partnership was signed in October 2023 during a visit by Fiji's prime minister Sitiveni Rabuka to Australia.; Governor General David Hurley made a state visit to Fiji in April 2022. |
| Kiribati | 12 July 1979 | Australia and Kiribati established diplomatic relations upon Kiribati's independence in 1979.; Australia has a high commission in Tarawa, opened in 1982. For a detailed history of Australia's accreditation to Kiribati see List of high commissioners of Australia to Kiribati.; Kiribati has an honorary consulate-general in Burradoo, New South Wales.; Australia and Kiribati enjoy close relations based on regional and international cooperation, trade links, a substantial development assistance program, support for maritime surveillance and broader security cooperation, and people to people contacts. The Kiribati-Australia Partnership for Development, signed in 2012, sets out the framework for Australia's development assistance. In December 2021, Australia announced funding with Japan and the United States of a major internet connectivity project under the US-Australia-Japan Trilateral Partnership for Infrastructure Investment in the Indo-Pacific. Kiribati is a participating country in Australia's Pacific Seasonal Workers Programme.; Kiribati is internationally recognised as one of the world's most vulnerable countries to climate change impact, and has been critical in recent years of Australia's climate policy. Australia has provided approximately $17.5 million in bilateral climate change and disaster resilience support to Kiribati since 2016 and at the 2019 Pacific Islands Forum pledged further financial support to strengthen climate change and disaster resilience in the Pacific.; Australian governors general Quentin Bryce and David Hurley made state visits to Kiribati in March 2012 and June 2023 respectively. |
| Marshall Islands | 8 July 1987 | See Australia–Marshall Islands relations: Australia was the second country, after the US, to establish diplomatic relations with the Marshall Islands following its independence.; From 1989 to 2021 Australia was accredited to the Marshall Islands from its embassy in Pohnpei, Micronesia. Australia opened a resident embassy in Majuro in May 2021.; The Marshall Islands is accredited to Australia from its embassy in Suva, Fiji.; The president of the Marshall Islands Hilda Heine visited Australia in 2017.; Australia is engaged closely with the Marshall Islands through Pacific regional organizations. Australia's bilateral aid program has traditionally focused on securing water supply and sanitation services, and improving social and economic opportunities for women and girls. |
| Micronesia | 6 July 1987 | See Australia–Federated States of Micronesia relations: Following Micronesia's independence, with the entry into force in November 1986 of a Compact of Free Association with the United States, Australia and Micronesia established diplomatic relations in July 1987. At that time, the Australian Consul-General in Honolulu was appointed non-resident Minister. In presenting credentials on 6 July 1987 the Minister became the first formally accredited diplomatic representative to the new country. Diplomatic relations were raised to ambassadorial level in 1989.; Australia has an embassy in Pohnpei, opened in November 1989.; Micronesia has an embassy in Canberra, opened in December 2024.; Australian merchandise trade with FSM in 2018–19 totalled $5.9 million. Australia's bilateral aid program in FSM has traditionally focussed on basic education and improving social and economic opportunities for women and girls. In December 2021, Australia announced funding with Japan and the United States of a major internet connectivity project under the US-Australia-Japan Trilateral Partnership for Infrastructure Investment in the Indo-Pacific.; Australian prime minister Malcolm Turnbull visited Pohnpei in 2016 to attend the 47th Pacific Islands Forum. |
| Nauru | 21 November 1972 | See Australia–Nauru relations: Australian-Nauruan relations go back the early 20th century. Australia administered Nauru as a dependent territory from 1914 to 1968, and has remained one of Nauru's foremost economic and aid partners thereafter. Upon independence until 1972 Nauru hosted a resident Australian Representative.; Full diplomatic relations began in 1972 with the upgrade of Australia's Representative to High Commissioner. For a full history of Australian accreditation to Nauru see List of high commissioners of Australia to Nauru.; Australia has a high commission in Aiwo.; Nauru has a high commission in Canberra, established in 2021, and a consulate-general in Brisbane.; A prominent element in relations between Australia and Nauru since the beginning of the 21st century has been the offshore processing of migrants seeking illegal entry into Australia, also referred to as the Pacific Solution. Nauru housed a detention centre from 2001 – 2008, and later the Nauru Regional Processing Centre from 2012 – 2019 and since 2021, for unauthorised refugee applicants attempting to enter Australia by boat, and Australia has provided financial aid in return. This has been an important source of employment for Nauruans.; Australia has expanded its engagement with Nauru following the announcement in 2016 of the Morrison government's Pacific Step-Up initiative. In September and October 2017, Nauru and Australia signed Memoranda of Understanding on security cooperation and on development cooperation. In December 2021, Australia announced funding with Japan and the United States of a major internet connectivity project under the US-Australia-Japan Trilateral Partnership for Infrastructure Investment in the Indo-Pacific. In December 2024, Australia and Nauru signed a budget support and security treaty which will further deepen the bilateral relationship.; There have been regular high level visits between the two nations. Recent high level visits have included the state visit of the Nauruan president in 2017, official visits of the Nauruan president to open premises of the new Nauruan High Commission in March 2022 and to sign the Nauru-Australia Treaty in Canberra in December 2024 and the Australian governor-general's visit commemorating Nauru's 50th anniversary of independence in 2018. |
| New Zealand | 14 December 1943 | See Australia–New Zealand relations The New Zealand Memorial, Canberra on ANZAC Parade (here showing the west side of the memorial) commemorates the close historical links between the two countries in wartime.: Australia has a high commission in Wellington and a consulate-general in Auckland. For a full history of Australian accreditation to New Zealand see List of high commissioners of Australia to New Zealand.; New Zealand has a high commission in Canberra, consulates-general in Melbourne and Sydney and an honorary consulate in Perth. For a detailed history of New Zealand accreditation to Australia see List of New Zealand High Commissioners to Australia.; The relationship between Australia and New Zealand is exceptionally close on both the national and interpersonal scales. This originates from the time of British colonisation of the South Pacific and subsequent political developments within the British Empire. New Zealand sent representatives to the 1890s constitutional conventions which led to the uniting of the six Australian colonies but opted not to join.; The ANZAC Spirit forged during the Gallipoli campaign in World War I cemented closer bonds which are commemorated annually in Anzac Day commemorations and in prominent memorials in both countries.; World War II saw the development by both countries of diplomatic networks independent of British Empire arrangements. The two countries opened high commissions in each other's capitals in 1943.; The Canberra Pact, formally the Australian-New Zealand Agreement, a treaty of mutual cooperation between the governments of Australia and New Zealand, was signed on 21 January 1944. This formalized by treaty the close bilateral relationship which had grown following World War I and during World War II. The Pact was followed by security treaties such as the 1951 ANZUS Treaty between the two nations and the United States, the 1971 Five Power Defence Arrangements with the United Kingdom, Malaysia and Singapore and the 1991 bilateral Closer Defence Relations Agreement.; The two countries have extensive economic links which have accelerated under the 1983 Australia–New Zealand Closer Economic Relations Trade Agreement or ANCERTA. Building on the ANZCERTA, in August 2009 Australia and New Zealand committed to a process called the Single Economic Market agenda, designed to create a seamless trans-Tasman business environment.; State visits are regularly exchanged between the governors-general of the two countries. Governor-general Paul Hasluck's state visit to New Zealand in February 1971 was the first overseas representational visit by an Australian governor-general, and it was reciprocated in October–November 1971 by the New Zealand governor-general. The most recent was the state visit of Dame Patsy Reddy to Australia in June 2021 Australian and New Zealand prime ministers hold an annual Leaders' Meeting and there are frequent ministerial meetings. New Zealand ministers and government officials have often participated with their Australian federal and state counterparts in relevant meetings of the Council of Australian Governments.; The 1973 Trans-Tasman Travel Arrangement allows for the free movement of Australian and New Zealand citizens between the two countries. Hundreds of thousands of Australians and New Zealanders cross the Tasman each year as tourists, for business purposes, or to visit family members. It is estimated that around 670,000 New Zealand citizens live in Australia (close to 15 per cent of New Zealand's population), while there are around 70,000 Australians in New Zealand.; The two countries maintain close cultural and sporting links. Former New Zealand prime minister Mike Moore declared that Australians and New Zealanders have more in common than New Yorkers and Californians. |
| Niue | 27 February 2013 | Australia and Niue established diplomatic relations on 27 February 2013, with Australia's High Commissioner in Wellington appointed as non-resident High Commissioner to Niue. Australia established a resident High Commission in Alofi in August 2020.; Niue does not presently have an accredited representative to Australia; Australia and Niue enjoy a friendly relationship based on shared membership of Pacific regional organisations, development cooperation and people-to-people links. |
| Palau | 1 October 1994 | See Australia–Palau relations: Australia has an embassy in Koror, opened in December 2019. Prior to this, the Australian Ambassador to the Federated States of Micronesia was accredited on a non-resident basis.; Palau has an honorary consulate-general in Sydney.; Australia engages with Palau through Pacific regional organizations and development assistance. Australia's bilateral aid program in Palau has traditionally focussed on digital sector reform, and improving social and economic opportunities for women and girls.; To address the issue of underdeveloped digital connectivity, the United States, Australia and Japan are collaborating with the government of Palau on the construction of a second undersea fibre optic cable connecting the country with the Southeast Asia-United States (SEA-US) system. Currently valued at $30 million, the project will help ensure reliable and secure digital connectivity in the island state. This is the first project conducted under the US-Australia-Japan Trilateral Partnership for Infrastructure Investment in the Indo-Pacific signed in 2018. |
| Papua New Guinea | 16 September 1975 | See Australia–Papua New Guinea relations A rugby league match between Papua New Guinea and Australian Prime Minister's XIII teams in Kokopo, PNG, 29 September 2013. Sporting links are an important and enduring element of the Australia-PNG bilateral relationship.: Papua New Guinea (PNG) is Australia's closest neighbour, and former dependent territory. The Territory of Papua came under Australian administration in 1902 and in 1920, Australia was given a League of Nations mandate to rule what was formerly German New Guinea. Diplomatic relations were established upon PNG's independence on 16 September 1975.; Australia has a high commission in Port Moresby and a consulate-general in Lae. The high commission opened in December 1973, ahead of independence, upon PNG's achievement of self government. For a detailed history of Australian representation see List of high commissioners of Australia to Papua New Guinea.; PNG has a high commission in Canberra and consulates-general in Brisbane and Sydney and a consulate in Cairns.; Relations between Canberra and Port Moresby are close, although there have been occasional tensions in recent years such as over the "Julian Moti affair". PNG has developed much closer relations with Australia than with Indonesia, the only country with which it shares a land border.; The Torres Strait Treaty was signed in December 1978 and entered into force in February 1985. It defines the maritime border between Australia and PNG and provides a framework for the management of the common border area. A special provision of the Treaty allows free movement (without passports or visas) between Australia and Papua New Guinea for traditional activities.; Government relations are underpinned by the 2020 Comprehensive Strategic and Economic Partnership and the Joint Declaration for a New Papua New Guinea-Australia Partnership. Leaders and ministers are in close and regular contact, including through an Annual Leaders' Dialogue and Ministerial Forum. The most recent state visit was by Australian governor-general Quentin Bryce in 2013. Australian prime minister Anthony Albanese became the first foreign head of government to address the PNG Parliament in January 2023. In February 2024, PNG Prime Minister James Marape became the first Pacific Island leader to address the Australian Parliament.; The Papua New Guinea-Australia Defence Cooperation Program is Australia's largest defence cooperation program with any country. This has been augmented in December 2023 with the signing of a Bilateral Security Agreement accompanied by an A$200 million commitment by Australia to support PNG's national security priorities; Australia is PNG's largest trading and commercial partner, with bilateral trade worth A$5.3 billion in 2022. Australian investment in PNG is worth A$26 billion (2022). The resource sector has traditionally been a focus of this investment, particularly gold mining and oil and gas.; Australia is PNG's largest source of Official Development Assistance. The 2023–2024 Australian bilateral aid budget is A$500 million; Reflecting the close historical association between Australia and PNG, there are over 10,000 Australians in PNG at any time, and approximately the same number of PNG nationals in Australia. |
| Samoa | 13 November 1971 | Australia and Samoa, which have enjoyed friendly relations since Samoa's independence in January 1962, formalized their diplomatic relations in 1971, with the appointment of the first non-resident Australian high commissioner based in Suva, Fiji.; Australia has a high commission in Apia, established in 1980. For a detailed history of Australian accreditation to Samoa see List of high commissioners of Australia to Samoa.; Samoa has a high commission in Canberra and a consulate-general in Sydney.; The 2021 census recorded over 98,000 Australians identifying themselves as of Samoan ancestry. Samoa participates in Australia's Pacific Labour Mobility Scheme.; Australia is among the largest development partners to Samoa. The 2023–2024 Australian Official Development Assistance budget for Samoa was $53.5 million. The Australian Defence Force supports Samoa's maritime security through the Pacific Maritime Security Program.; Australia is Samoa's fourth largest merchandise export destination. In 2022, Australia imported goods from Samoa worth around A$52.5 million. Australia is also Samoa's fourth largest source of merchandise imports. In 2022, Australian merchandise exports to Samoa totaled A$59.4 million.; There are regular visits of Samoan leaders to Australia, most recently by Prime Minister Fiamē Naomi Mataʻafa in March 2023. Australian governors general Peter Cosgrove and David Hurley made official visits to Samoa in July 2017 and June 2023 respectively. Prime Minister Malcolm Turnbull visited Samoa in 2017 to attend the Pacific Island Forum Leaders' Meeting. |
| Solomon Islands | 7 July 1978 | See Australia–Solomon Islands relations Solomon Islands prime minister Manasseh Sogavare greeting Australian governor-general Peter Cosgrove at ceremonies marking the end of the RAMSI mission, June 28, 2017.: Australia and the Solomon Islands established diplomatic relations upon the latter's independence in July 1978; Australia has a high commission in Honiara opened in 1982. For a detailed history of Australia's accreditation to the Solomon Islands see Australian High Commissioner to the Solomon Islands.; The Solomon Islands has a high commission in Canberra, a consulate-general in Brisbane and an honorary consulate in Melbourne.; Australia is the Solomon Islands' main development partner, providing over $174 million of Official Development Assistance in 2019–20. There are extensive business and people-to-people links between the two countries and the Solomon Islands participates in Australia's Pacific Labour Scheme.; In response to ethnic violence and economic collapse in the Solomon Islands, Australia led, from 2003 to 2017, the Regional Assistance Mission to Solomon Islands (RAMSI), a multinational security deployment to restore law and justice, and to improve both economic governance and the machinery of government. This had military (2003–2013), policing and institutional capacity building components. In August 2017, following the termination of RAMSI, the two governments signed a security treaty which would allow Australian police, defence and associated civilian personnel to deploy rapidly to Solomon Islands in the event of an emergency.; In 2006 relations reached a low point between the John Howard and Manasseh Sogavare governments, primarily over the "Julian Moti affair", leading to the expulsion of the Australian high commissioner Relations improved with the changes in government in both countries in 2007.; Australian governor-general Peter Cosgrove visited in June 2017, leading a delegation of Australian ministers to farewell the RAMSI mission.; During the July 2018 visit of Prime Minister Rick Houenipwela, the two countries and Papua New Guinea signed an agreement for a Coral Sea underwater telecommunication cable network primarily funded by Australia, to link remote Solomon Islands communities to Honiara and link the national network to Australia and Papua New Guinea. The new system was completed in late 2019.; During the visit by Australian prime minister Scott Morrison to Honiara in June 2019, as part of Australia's Pacific Step Up initiative Morrison announced an additional bilateral infrastructure program worth up to $250 million in grant financing over 10 years.; While close relations continued after the re-election of Sogovare as Prime Minister of the Solomon Islands in April 2019, a March 2022 security pact between the Solomon Islands and China, and Sogovare's response to adverse Australian official and media reaction to this, produced a new chill in the relationship. The Albanese Government has sought to improve relations. Prime Minister Sogovare visited Canberra for official talks on 6 October 2022 and Australian deputy prime minister and Defence Minister Richard Marles visited Honiara in June 2023. |
| Tonga | 29 November 1970 | See Australia–Tonga relations: Australia and Tonga have enjoyed long-standing friendly relations dating well before Tonga's resumption of sovereignty in June 1970. The two countries established formal diplomatic relations upon the appointment in November 1970 of the first Australian high commissioner and presentation of credentials in December 1970.; Australia has a high commission in Nukuʻalofa, established in 1980. Prior to this the Australian high commissioner was accredited on a non-resident basis from Suva, Fiji. For a detailed history of Australian accreditation to Tonga see List of high commissioners of Australia to Tonga.; Tonga has a high commission in Canberra, established in 2008 and an honorary consulate-general in Sydney.; Australia and Tonga enjoy a close bilateral relationship, supported by a large development assistance program, Defence Cooperation Program, the Tonga Police Development Program and people-to-people links. Australia is an important focus for Tongans seeking education, travel and business opportunities. Approximately 33,000 Australians identify themselves as of Tongan ancestry. Tonga participates in Australia's Pacific Labour Mobility program. Two-way trade between Australia and Tonga was valued at approximately $119 million in goods and services in 2018–19.; Following the 2006 riots in Tonga, Australia sent police officers, at Tonga's request, to help stabilise the situation in the kingdom.; There are regular exchanges of high level and ministerial visits between the two countries. Most recently governors-general Quentin Bryce and David Hurley have made state visits to Tonga in July–August 2011 and June 2023 respectively. Quentin Bryce also represented Australia in March 2012 at the funeral for the late king of Tonga, His Majesty King George Tupou V. Her successor, Peter Cosgrove, visited Tonga in July 2015 for the coronation of His Majesty King Tupou VI. |
| Tuvalu | 1 October 1978 | See Australia–Tuvalu relations: Australia established a high commission in Funafuti, Tuvalu in February 2019. Prior to this Australia's High Commissioner was accredited on a non-resident basis from Suva, Fiji. For a detailed history of Australian accreditation to Tuvalu see List of high commissioners of Australia to Tuvalu.; Tuvalu has a high commission in Canberra, established in May 2025.; Australia has strong ties with Tuvalu, being one of the three founding donating countries to the Tuvalu Trust Fund, and continues as a major donor of aid and technical assistance to Tuvalu. Tuvalu participates in Australia's Pacific Labour Scheme.; Australian governors general Quentin Bryce and David Hurley paid official visits to Tuvalu in 2012 and 2023 respectively. Australian prime minister Scott Morrison visited Tuvalu in August 2019 for the 50th Pacific Islands Forum summit.; On 10 November 2023, Tuvalu signed the Falepili Union, a bilateral diplomatic relationship with Australia, under which Australia will increase its contribution to the Tuvalu Trust Fund and to the Tuvalu Coastal Adaptation Project (TCAP). Australia will also provide a pathway for citizens of Tuvalu to migrate to Australia, to enable climate-related mobility for Tuvaluans. |
| Vanuatu | 30 July 1980 | Australia established a consulate in Port Vila in 1978, which was upgraded to a high commission in July 1980 upon Vanuatu's independence. For a detailed history of Australian representation to Vanuatu see List of high commissioners of Australia to Vanuatu.; Vanuatu has a high commission in Canberra.; Australia is Vanuatu's largest bilateral aid donor and closest security partner. A Bilateral Security Treaty was signed in December 2022. The 2020–2021 Australian Official Development Assistance budget for Vanuatu was $75.6 million.; Australia is Vanuatu's largest source of foreign direct investment, mostly directed in the areas of tourist development, agriculture and construction. Australia has been Vanuatu's largest source of tourists.; Australian governor-general Quentin Bryce paid an official visit to Vanuatu in 2010. As part of the Australian Government's Pacific Step Up initiative, Prime Minister Scott Morrison made the first bilateral visit to Vanuatu by an Australian prime minister in January 2019. Vanuatu's prime ministers have regularly visited Australia, the most recent from Alatoi Ishmael Kalsakau in February 2023. |

== See also ==
- Anti-nuclear movement in Australia
- ANZUS
- AUKUS
- Australia and the United Nations
- Australia House (Ottawa)
- Australian contribution to the 2003 Gulf War
- CANZUK International and CANZUK
- Defence of Australia Policy
- Five Eyes
- List of Australians imprisoned or executed abroad
- List of diplomatic missions in Australia
- List of diplomatic missions of Australia
- Peace movements in Australia
- Quadrilateral Security Dialogue
- UKUSA Agreement
- Visa requirements for Australian citizens
