= Siagian =

Batak surname originating in Indonesia

Siagian is one of Toba Batak clans originating in North Sumatra, Indonesia. People of this clan bear the clan's name as their surname. Notable people of this clan include:

- Bachtiar Siagian (1923–2002), Indonesian film director and scriptwriter
- Batara Goempar Siagian (born 1985), Indonesian cinematographer
- Sabam Siagian (1932–2016), Indonesian journalist
