= Consulate General of Australia, Surabaya =

Australian Consulate-General in Surabaya Konsulat Jenderal Australia di Surabaya
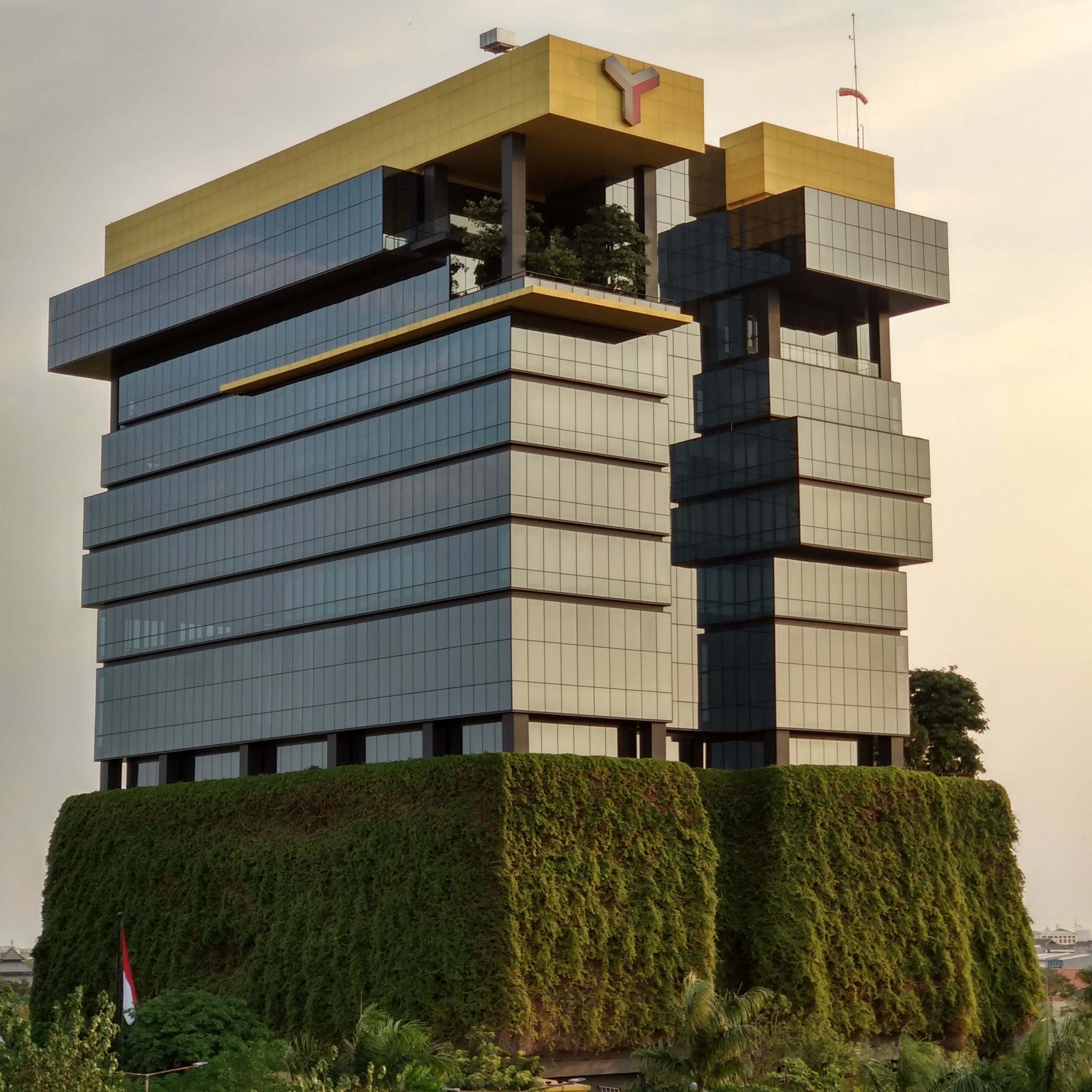
- Seat of Australian Consulate-General in ESA Sampoerna Center
- Address: (Indonesia) Level 3 ESA Sampoerna Center, Jl. Dr. Ir. Soekarno No. 198, Sukolilo, Surabaya, East Java
- Coordinates: 7.286476°S 112.780419°E
- Opening: 26 February 2017; 9 years ago
- Inaugurated: 9 August 2017
- Consul General: Fiona Hoggart
- Website: surabaya.consulate.gov.au

The Australian Consulate-General in Surabaya (Indonesian: Konsulat Jenderal Australia di Surabaya) represents the Commonwealth of Australia in Surabaya, the second most populous city in Indonesia. The Consulate-General of Australia in Surabaya was established in February 2017, and is the fourth diplomatic mission of Australia in Indonesia after Jakarta (1935), Denpasar (1981), and Makassar (2016). The seat of the consulate-general is located on Level 3 of ESA Sampoerna Center, Sukolilo, Surabaya, East Java. Chris Barnes served as the first consul-general in Surabaya. He was replaced by Fiona Hoggart in December 2021.

== See also ==
- Australia–Indonesia relations
- Embassy of Australia, Jakarta
- List of consuls-general of Australia in Bali
- Australian ambassadors to Indonesia
- Embassy of Indonesia, Canberra
- Indonesian ambassadors to Australia
- Diplomatic missions of Australia
- Diplomatic missions in Indonesia
