= Pramono =

Pramono is an Indonesian name. Notable people with the name include:

- Pramono Anung, Governor of Jakarta since 2025
- Pramono Edhie Wibowo (1955–2020), Indonesian military officer
- Ardhito Pramono (born 1995), Indonesian singer
- Hendri Susilo Pramono (born 1979), Indonesian tennis player
- Siswo Pramono, Indonesian diplomat
