= List of consuls-general of Australia in Bali =

Australian Consul-General in Bali

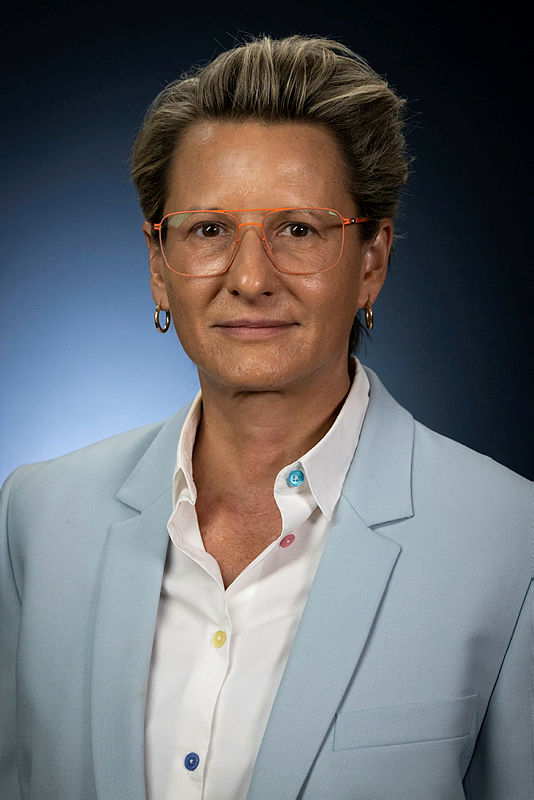
- Incumbent; Jo Stevens since September 2023
- Style: Her Excellency
- Reports to: Australian Ambassador to Indonesia
- Residence: Denpasar
- Nominator: Prime Minister of Australia
- Appointer: Governor General of Australia
- Inaugural holder: Michael Mann (Consul)
- Formation: 10 November 1981
- Website: Australian Consulate-General in Bali

The Australian consul-general in Bali represents Australia in the Indonesian provinces of Bali, Nusa Tenggara Barat, and Nusa Tenggara Timur. The consulate-general has its offices in Denpasar. Like the Australian consulates-general in Makassar (since 2016) and Surabaya (since 2017), the consulate-general in Bali reports to the Australian Embassy in Jakarta, which reports to the Department of Foreign Affairs and Trade in Canberra, Australia, a process in line with the majority of Australia's consulates around the world.

== Posting history ==
The consulate-general was first established as a consulate in 1981 in response to increasing demand for consular services by the number of Australian tourists visiting the island. The consulate was officially opened by the Australian Ambassador to Indonesia, Rawdon Dalrymple, on 30 January 1982, who noted: "The establishment of a permanent Australian Consulate here is clear recognition of the importance of that relationship [with Indonesia] and of the special place Bali occupies in the affections of the Australian people. Australians have been visiting Bali for many years, the majority as tourists. But there are others, artists and musicians for example, who have sought and found inspiration in the vitality and originality of Balinese culture and in the natural beauty of the island." The consulate was upgraded to a consulate-general in 2001, and in 2007 a new consulate-general building designed by James Cubitt Architects was opened in Denpasar.

== Consuls-general ==
Name	Start of term	End of term	References
Michael Mann (Consul)	10 November 1981	1983	
Ray Gardiner (Consul)	1984	1985	
Kevin Thornton (Consul)	1985	1986	
K. J. McMahon (Consul)	1989	1991	
Stephanie Daly (Consul)	1992	February 1995	
George Fraser (Consul)	March 1995	1999	
Ross Tysoe	1999	January 2003	
Brent Hall	January 2003	December 2005	
Bruce Cowled	December 2005	February 2009	
Lex Bartlem	February 2009	December 2010	
Brett Farmer	December 2010	February 2014	
Majell Hind	February 2014	December 2015	
Helena Studdert	18 December 2015	March 2019	
Anthea Griffin	March 2019	September 2023	
Jo Stevens	September 2023	present	

== See also ==
- Australia–Indonesia relations
- Australian Consulate-General, Surabaya
- Embassy of Australia, Jakarta
- Ambassadors of Australia to Indonesia
- Embassy of Indonesia, Canberra
- Ambassadors of Indonesia to Australia
