= List of ambassadors of Australia to Indonesia =

Ambassador of Australia to Indonesia

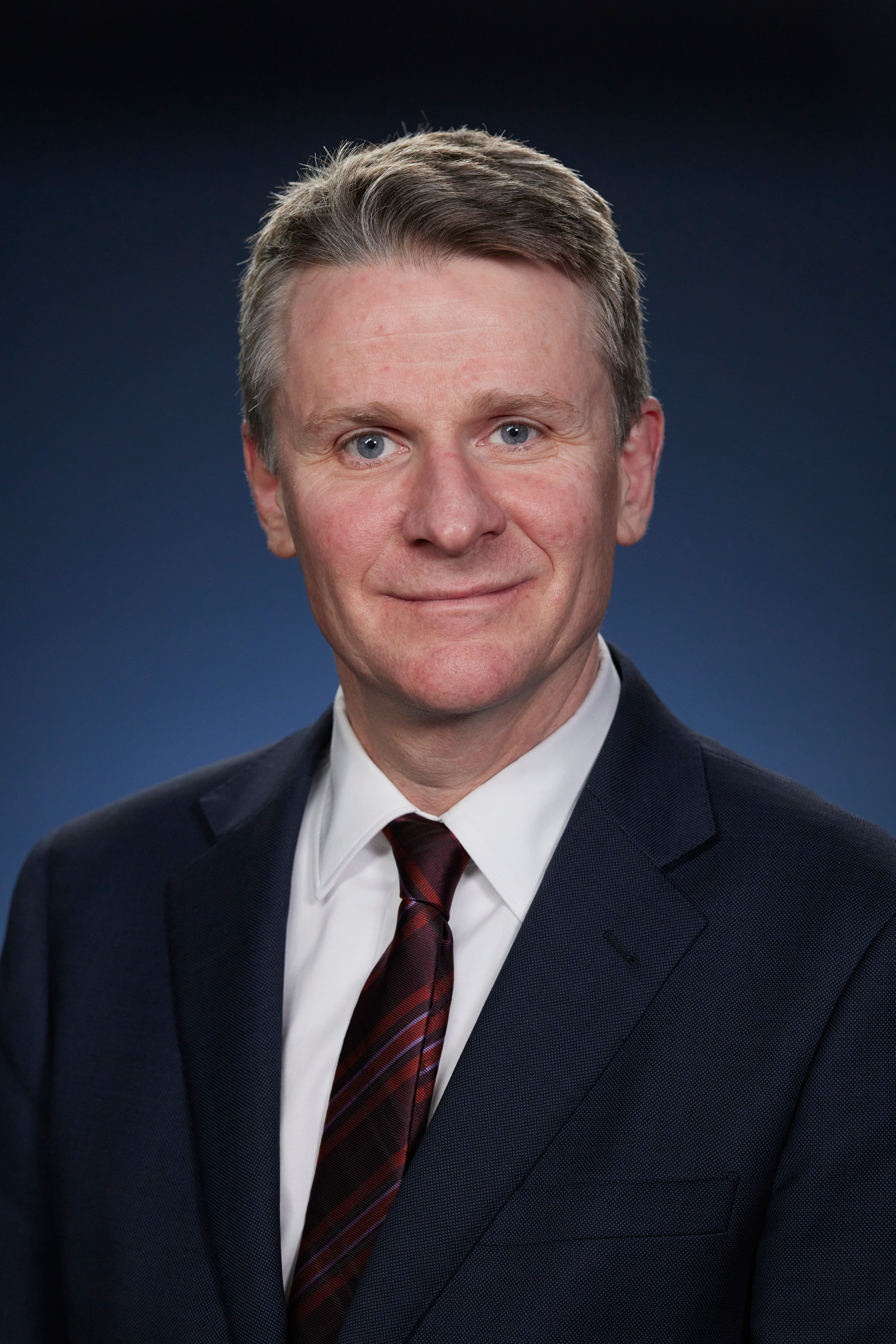
- Incumbent; Rod Brazier since 23 December 2024
- Department of Foreign Affairs and Trade
- Style: His Excellency
- Reports to: Minister for Foreign Affairs
- Residence: Jakarta
- Nominator: Prime Minister of Australia
- Appointer: Governor General of Australia
- Inaugural holder: John Hood (Ambassador)
- Formation: April 1950
- Website: Australian Embassy, Indonesia

The ambassador of Australia to Indonesia is an officer of the Australian Department of Foreign Affairs and Trade and the head of the Embassy of the Commonwealth of Australia to the Republic of Indonesia. The position has the rank and status of an ambassador extraordinary and plenipotentiary and the embassy in Jakarta is Australia's largest embassy and one of Australia's most important overseas posts. The embassy is assisted in their work by Consulates in Bali (since 1981), Makassar (since 2016) and Surabaya (since 2017).

The current ambassador, since December 2024, is Rod Brazier.

== Posting history ==
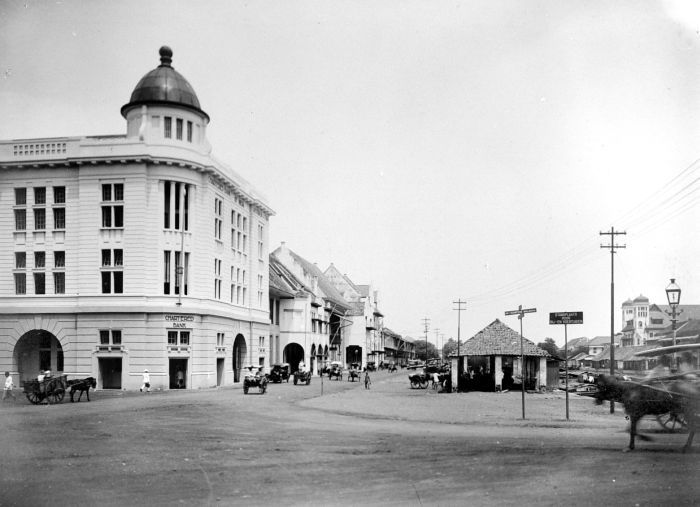
The Chartered Bank Building at Kali Besar West, Batavia, site of the Australian Trade Commission from 1935.

On 30 August 1933 the Minister for Commerce, Frederick Stewart, secured Cabinet approval for the establishment of several Trade Commissions in the East, with Batavia in the Netherlands East Indies being one of the most likely locations. However a decision to appoint a commissioner was delayed pending the report of the Australian Eastern Mission, Attorney General and Minister for External Affairs John Latham's fact-finding mission to the Far East, which found a dire need for Australian trade representative to improve mercantile connections in the region. Following Latham's return the Australian Government agreed to appoint a new Trade Commissioner, and the appointment of Charles Edward Critchley to Batavia, alongside appointments to Tokyo and Shanghai, was announced on 7 June 1935 by acting Prime Minister Earle Page. Arriving in September, Critchley met with Governor-General Bonifacius Cornelis de Jonge and set up offices in the Chartered Bank Building in Tambora, Old Batavia. In January 1938, Critchley was succeeded by Herbert Anton Peterson, who was given the new title of "Australian Government Commissioner", which was changed to remove confusion that the "Trade Commissioner" was merely a commercial representative. Commissioner Peterson served until escaping to Australia a few days after the Japanese invasion of Java in 1942.

Early Australian arrangements to establish diplomatic relations with Indonesia after the Indonesian proclamation of Independence on 17 August 1945 were complicated by the British and Dutch involvement in military activities in Indonesia in the next few years. Australia was dissuaded from establishing a consulate-general in Batavia in 1945 and instead sent a political representative to be attached to the Allied Forces, Netherlands East Indies (AFNEI), the command controlling areas of the Dutch East Indies liberated from Japanese forces. William Macmahon Ball, the Australian Political Representative to the AFNEI, arrived in Batavia on 7 November 1945 and returned to Australia in December 1945. In March 1946 the Department of External Affairs appointed Alfred Deakin Brookes as the new Political Representative. However, his departure in early June, owing to ill health, coincided with the arrival of Justice Richard Kirby, who acted as Political Representative in his absence before returning to Australia on 28 July 1946. Bertram Ballard was appointed as Australian Political Representative with AFNEI on 16 August 1946, as political representative Ballard was advised by Minister for External Affairs, Herbert Evatt directed him to establish informal relations with the Indonesians and to act as Australia's de facto representative to the republican government in Jogjakarta.

The post of consul-general was created following the departure of AFNEI in late 1946 following the Indonesia-Dutch settlement, and Ballard was formally appointed consul-general on 5 December 1946 and accredited by the Netherlands East Indies Government on 12 February 1947. He held this appointment until September 1947 when Charles Eaton, the former consul to Portuguese Timor, replaced him. In April 1950, the consulate-general in Jakarta was raised to the status of an embassy, with the first Australian ambassador to Indonesia, John Hood, appointed by External Affairs Minister Percy Spender.

== List of heads of mission ==
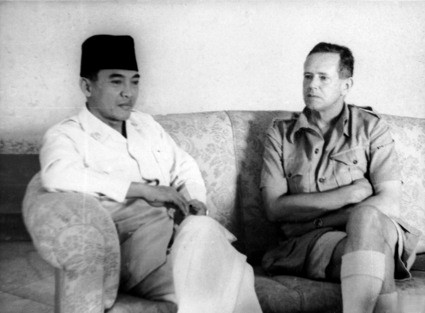
Eaton as Australian Consul-General to Indonesia, with Sukarno in 1947

Ordinal	Officeholder	Title	Term start date	Term end date	Time in office	Notes
n/a	Charles Edward Critchley	Trade Commissioner	7 June 1935	January 1938	2 years, 6 months	
n/a	Herbert Anton Peterson	Commissioner	January 1938	3 March 1942	4 years, 2 months	
n/a	William Macmahon Ball	Political Representative	7 November 1945	December 1945	1 month	
n/a	Alfred Deakin Brookes	Political Representative	March 1946	June 1946	3 months	
n/a	Richard Kirby	Acting Political Representative	June 1946	28 July 1946	1 month	
n/a	Bertram Ballard	Political Representative	6 August 1946	5 November 1946	1 year, 31 days	
n/a	Bertram Ballard	Consul-General	5 December 1946	September 1947	1 year, 31 days	
n/a	Group Captain Charles Eaton OBE, AFC	Consul-General	September 1947	April 1950	2 years, 7 months	
1	John Hood	Ambassador of Australia to Indonesia	24 June 1950	1953	2–3 years	
2	Charles Kevin	Minister and Charge d'Affaires	11 March 1953	1955	1–2 years	
3	Walter Crocker CBE	Ambassador of Australia to Indonesia	7 April 1955	1957	1–2 years	
4	Laurence McIntyre CBE	Ambassador of Australia to Indonesia	28 January 1957	1960	2–3 years	
5	Patrick Shaw CBE	Ambassador of Australia to Indonesia	6 March 1960	1962	1–2 years	
6	K. C. O. Shann CBE	Ambassador of Australia to Indonesia	6 November 1962	1966	3–4 years	
7	Max Loveday	Ambassador of Australia to Indonesia	6 April 1966	1969	2–3 years	
8	Gordon Jockel CBE	Ambassador of Australia to Indonesia	7 March 1969	1972	2–3 years	
9	Robert Furlonger	Ambassador of Australia to Indonesia	1 March 1972	1975	2–3 years	
10	Richard Woolcott	Ambassador of Australia to Indonesia	3 March 1975	1978	2–3 years	^{[note a]}
11	Tom Critchley AO, CBE	Ambassador of Australia to Indonesia	17 May 1978	1981	2–3 years	
12	Rawdon Dalrymple AO	Ambassador of Australia to Indonesia	18 March 1981	1985	3–4 years	
13	Bill Morrison AO	Ambassador of Australia to Indonesia	28 April 1985	1989	3–4 years	
14	Philip Flood AO	Ambassador of Australia to Indonesia	2 February 1989	1993	3–4 years	
15	Allan Taylor AM	Ambassador of Australia to Indonesia	6 April 1993	1996	2–3 years	
16	John McCarthy AO	Ambassador of Australia to Indonesia	1996	2001	4–5 years	
17	Ric Smith AO	Ambassador of Australia to Indonesia	2001	2003	1–2 years	
18	David Ritchie AO	Ambassador of Australia to Indonesia	2003	2005	1–2 years	^{[note b]}
19	Bill Farmer AO	Ambassador of Australia to Indonesia	2005	2010	4–5 years	
20	Greg Moriarty	Ambassador of Australia to Indonesia	August 2010	2014	3–4 years	
21	Paul Grigson	Ambassador of Australia to Indonesia	February 2015	27 February 2018	3 years	^{[note c]}
22	Gary Quinlan AO	Ambassador of Australia to Indonesia	27 February 2018	14 April 2021	3 years, 46 days	^{[note d]}
23	Penny Williams PSM	Ambassador of Australia to Indonesia	1 September 2021	2024	3 years	
24	Rod Brazier	Ambassador of Australia to Indonesia	23 December 2024	incumbent	1 year, 328 days	

^[note a]: Woolcott was Australian ambassador in Jakarta when difficulties over developments in Portuguese Timor, later Timor Leste, came to a head.
^[note b]: There was initially a slight delay in Jakarta before Ritchie's appointment was approved. This was reportedly because of some concerns in the Indonesian Parliament about the possible approach that Ritchie might take towards Indonesian policy in Papua in responding to problems of regional conflict in the province.
^[note c]: On 29 April 2015 the Australian Prime Minister Tony Abbott announced that Grigson would be recalled to Canberra for consultations following the execution of two Australians in Indonesia who had been convicted of drug smuggling. Grigson returned to his post in Jakarta in early June after being in Canberra for consultations for about six weeks.
^[note d]: In early April 2020, Quinlan temporarily relocated to Australia because of his vulnerability to COVID-19 infections. He was expected to continue to oversee Australian embassy operations in Jakarta from Canberra.

== Consuls-General ==
=== Makassar ===
Name	Start of term	End of term	Notes
Richard Mathews	22 March 2016	2020	
Bronwyn Robbins	26 June 2020	on-going	

=== Surabaya ===
Name	Start of term	End of term	Notes
Chris Barnes	9 August 2017	20 December 2021	
Fiona Hoggart	20 December 2021	incumbent	

== See also ==
- Australia–Indonesia relations
- Embassy of Australia, Jakarta
- Embassy of Indonesia, Canberra
- Indonesian ambassadors to Australia
- Australian Consulate-General, Surabaya
- Consuls-General of Australia
