= Wiryono Sastrohandoyo =

Indonesian diplomat (born 1934)

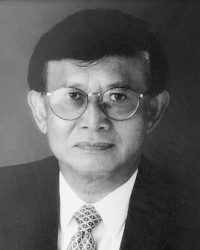
- Wiryono Sastrohandoyo, Ambassador of the Republic of Indonesia to Australia
- Born: 31 May 1934 (age 92); Yogyakarta, Special Region of Yogyakarta
- Education: University of Indonesia
- Occupation: Diplomat

Wiryono Sastrohandoyo (born 31 May 1934) is a former Indonesian diplomat. He was ambassador to Austria, France and Australia.

Born in Yogyakarta, Special Region of Yogyakarta on 31 May 1934, Wiryono graduated from Yogyakarta Faculty in 1959.

Joining the Ministry of Foreign Affairs in 1962, his career saw him in diplomatic roles in Argentina, the United States, Austria, France and Australia. He was Indonesia's Permanent Representative to the UN in Vienna from 1988 to 1989 and Ambassador to France from 1993 to 1996.

Appointed ambassador to Australia in December 1995, Wiryono was tasked with the job of rebuilding the bilateral relationship. Indonesia had withdrawn the appointment of its previous ambassador in July 1995 after pressure from the Australian Government. Relations between the two countries were somewhat strained, recent protests in Australia had involved burning the flag of Indonesia. The Australian Government was also conducting an inquiry into the 1975 death of six journalists during the Indonesian invasion of East Timor—20 years after the fact.

Diplomatic posts
Preceded by	Ambassador of Indonesia to Austria; Permanent Representative to the UN in Vienna; 1988–1989	Succeeded by
Preceded by	Ambassador of Indonesia to France; 1993–1996	Succeeded by
Preceded by Sabam Siagian	Ambassador of Indonesia to Australia; 1996–1999	Succeeded by Arizal Effendi
