= 2005 Indonesian embassy bioterrorism hoax =

Coordinates: 35°18′14″S 149°07′00″E

The 2005 Indonesian embassy bioterrorism hoax occurred when Indonesian ambassador to Australia Imron Cotan received a suspect letter addressed to him at the Indonesian Embassy in Canberra, Australia, on 1 June 2005. The suspect letter later turned out to be harmless.

== Events ==
The letter was opened by his personal assistant and contained white bacterial powder and a threatening message. Prime Minister John Howard made an apology to Indonesia after the incident, describing the incident as "a reckless act of indifference to human life".

"Insofar as possible retaliatory action is concerned in Indonesia, there is always a danger of that," the Prime Minister said. "Just as we cannot guarantee that a random act of stupidity with an evil intent from among our 20 million people will not occur, equally I cannot expect a guarantee from the Indonesian Government that some evil act of retaliation will not occur in that country."

The identity of the powder and whether it posed any health risk was initially unclear; initial testing of the powder detected traces of a "biological agent", but it was later found to be nontoxic. Approximately 50 staff members were quarantined for 12 hours. The embassy remained closed for several days following the incident.

The act is suspected to be related to the Schapelle Corby trial held at the time in Bali, Indonesia. Other Indonesian Diplomatic missions around Australia have reported receiving threatening emails and letters since the trial began. A bullet was sent in an envelope to the Indonesia consulate in Perth.

On 3 June 2005, a section of Parliament House was sealed off when the discovery of a suspicious package delivered to Foreign Minister Alexander Downer was discovered in the car park. The suspect package was taken away for analysis and no evacuations occurred. The analysis has since shown the contents to be harmless but forensic tests are continuing to establish if there are any links between this package and the earlier one sent to the Indonesian embassy.

Various news reports, including those from SBS have reported that the enclosed letter was written in Indonesian, with a high degree of competence. However, this has been contradicted in other reports, see links below.

== See also ==
- Bioterrorism
