= List of ambassadors of Indonesia to Australia =

Ambassador of Indonesia to Australia Accredited to Vanuatu
- Duta Besar Indonesia untuk Australia
- Emblem of the Ministry of Foreign Affairs

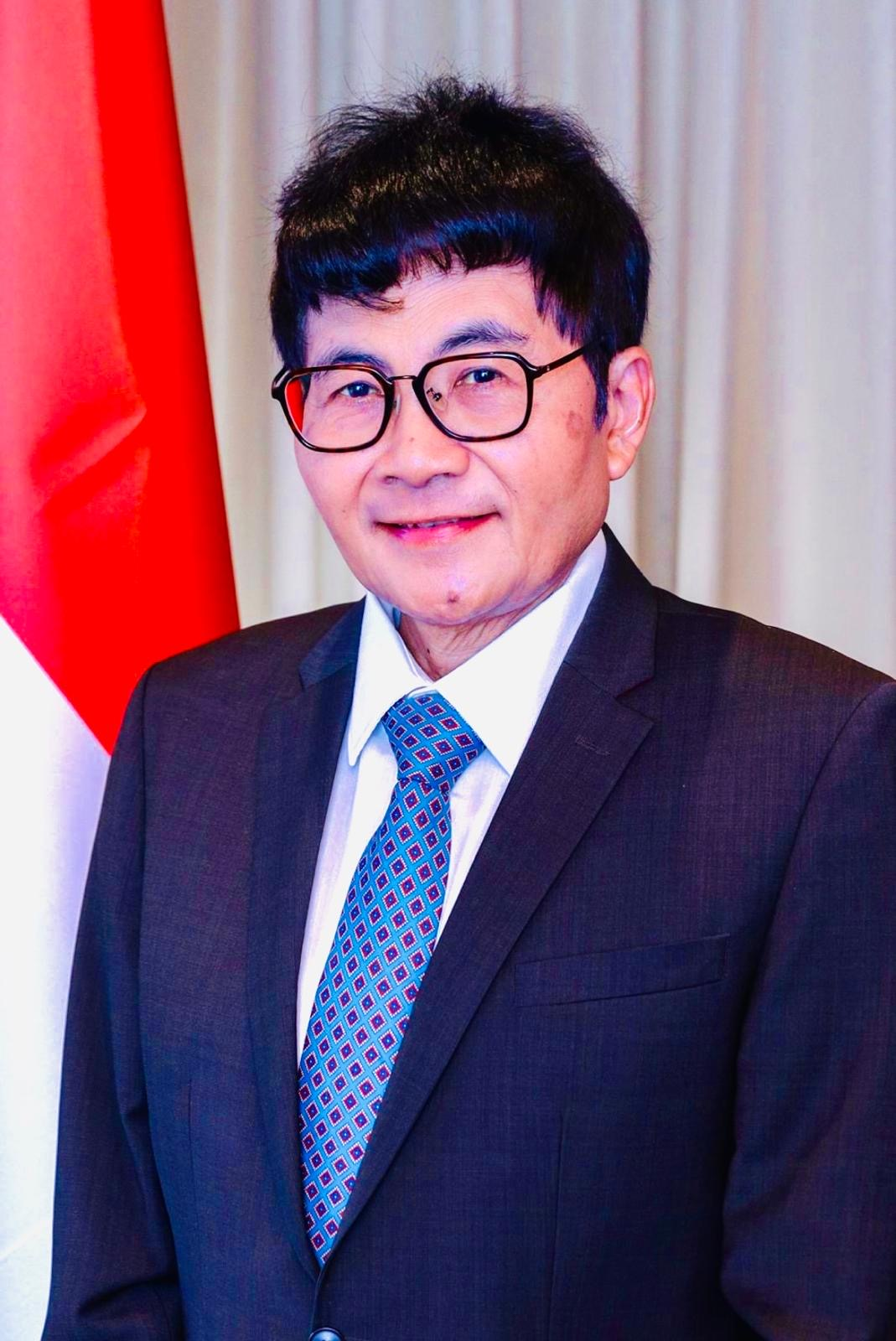
- Incumbent; Siswo Pramono since 25 October 2021
- Ministry of Foreign Affairs; Embassy of Indonesia, Canberra
- Seat: Canberra, Australia
- Appointer: President of Indonesia
- Inaugural holder: Usman Sastroamidjojo
- Formation: 1947
- Website: kemlu.go.id/canberra

The following are the list of Indonesian diplomats that served as Ambassador of the Republic of Indonesia to the Commonwealth of Australia.

No.	Name	From	Until
1.	Usman Sastroamidjojo	1947	1951
2.	Oetojo Ramelan	1951	1953
3.	M. Tamzil	1953	1956
4.	R.H. Tirtawinata	1956	1956
5.	J. Helmi	1956	1961
6.	Suadi Suromihardjo	1961	1964
7.	R.A. Kosasih	1964	1968
8.	Raden Hidayat	1968	1970
9.	Sujitno Sukirno	1970	1973
10.	Her Tasning	1973	1976
11.	Nurmathias	1976	1979
12.	Erman Harirustaman	1980	1984
13.	August Marpaung	1984	1987
14.	Roesman	1987	1991
15.	Sabam Siagian	1991	1995
16.	Wiryono Sastrohandoyo	1996	1999
17.	Arizal Effendi	1999	2001
18.	Sudjadnan Parnohadiningrat	2001	2002
19.	Imron Cotan	2003	2005
20.	Teuku Mohammad Hamzah Thayeb	11 November 2005	2009
21.	Primo Alui Joelianto	2009	2013
22.	Nadjib Riphat Kesoema (*)	2013	2017
23.	Kristiarto Legowo	27 June 2017	Oct 2021
24.	Siswo Pramono	25 October 2021 (Credential: 8 December 2021)	Incumbent

(*) Ambassador Nadjib was recalled to Jakarta between November 2013 and May 2014 following reports of Australian intelligence activities in Indonesia.

== See also ==
- Australia–Indonesia relations
- Embassy of Indonesia, Canberra
- Embassy of Australia, Jakarta
- Australian ambassadors to Indonesia
- Australian Consulate-General, Surabaya
- Consuls-General of Australia
