= Embassy of Australia, Jakarta =

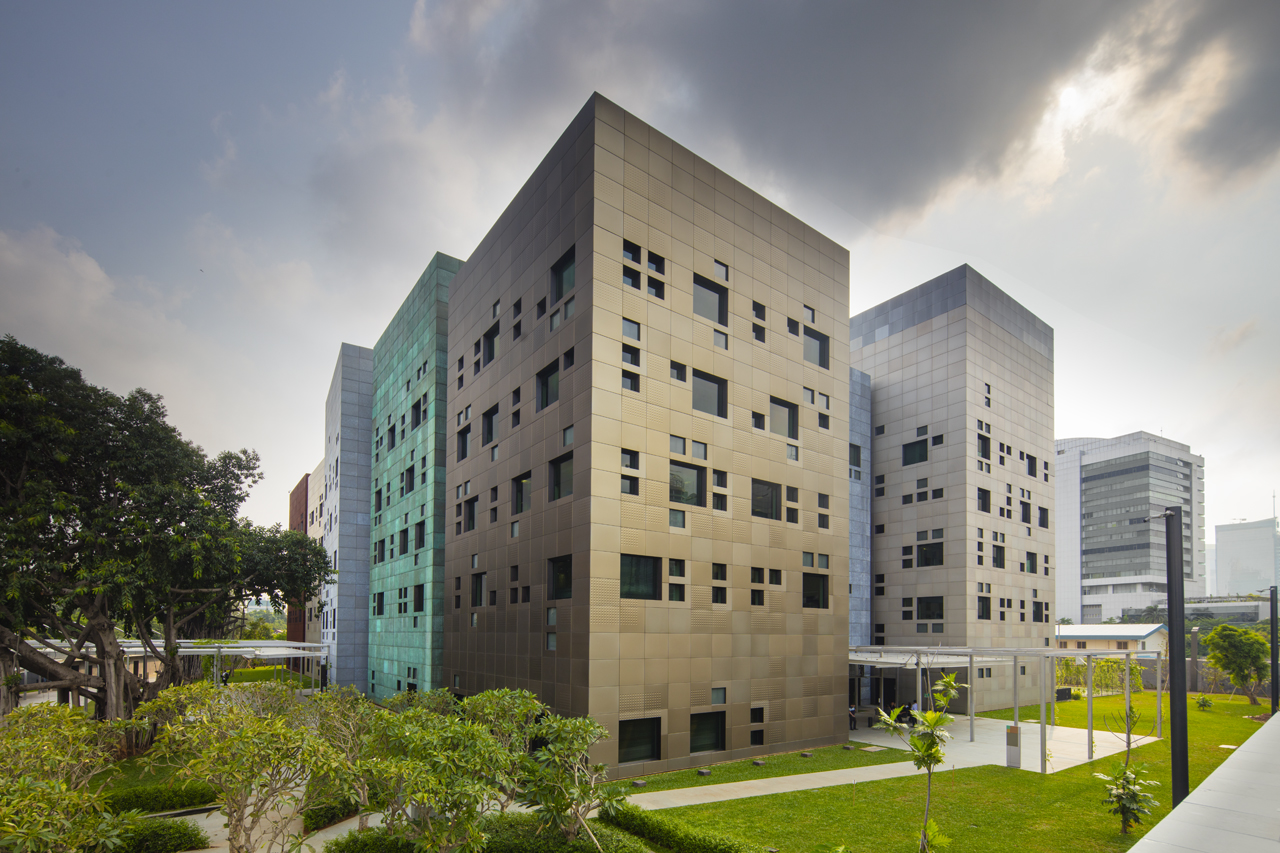
- Building of the embassy in 2016
- Location: Jakarta
- Address: Jalan Patra Kuningan Raya Kav. 1-4; Setiabudi, South Jakarta
- Coordinates: 6°13′55.5″S 106°50′2.9″E
- Ambassador: Rod Brazier
- Website: indonesia.embassy.gov.au

The Embassy of Australia in Jakarta (Indonesian: Kedutaan Besar Australia di Jakarta) is the diplomatic mission of Australia in Indonesia, located within the Golden Triangle.

== History ==
The first formal representation of Australia in the Dutch East Indies was founded on Batavia by 1935 in form of a trade commissioner based on the Kali Besar West road. While Australia did not maintain many official representations before World War II, by 1945 it had opened multiple embassies in various countries. Following the proclamation of Indonesian Independence, Australia was dissuaded by Britain from establishing a consulate-general and instead sent a representative to military forces there. In 1946, F.K. Officer was assigned as the representative to Southeast Asia, and was partially tasked with aiding negotiations. After several more representative replacements, in late November 1946 allied forces (AFNEI) left the area and the post of Consul-General was established on 5 December 1946. By 1950 the office was elevated to that of an ambassador, with John Hood becoming the first person to hold that post.

=== Bombing ===
On 9 September 2004, Jemaah Islamiyah launched a car bomb attack on the embassy, killing at least 9 people and injuring over 170. While several other embassies in the area were also damaged with some diplomats injured, all fatalities were Indonesian nationals. The perpetrators were later arrested and were sentenced to death in 2005.

Following the attack, talks on a more secure facility commenced and after a decade the embassy moved to its current building in 2016, occupying over 50,000 square meters and costing $415 million. Located immediately next to the British Embassy, it is both Australia's biggest and most costly embassy as of its completion.

== See also ==
- Australia–Indonesia relations
- Ambassadors of Australia to Indonesia
- Embassy of Indonesia, Canberra
- Ambassadors of Indonesia to Australia
- Australian Consulate-General, Surabaya
- Consuls-General of Australia
- Diplomatic missions of Australia
- Diplomatic missions in Indonesia
