= Embassy of Indonesia, Canberra =

Embassy of the Republic of Indonesia in Canberra Kedutaan Besar Republik Indonesia di Canberra

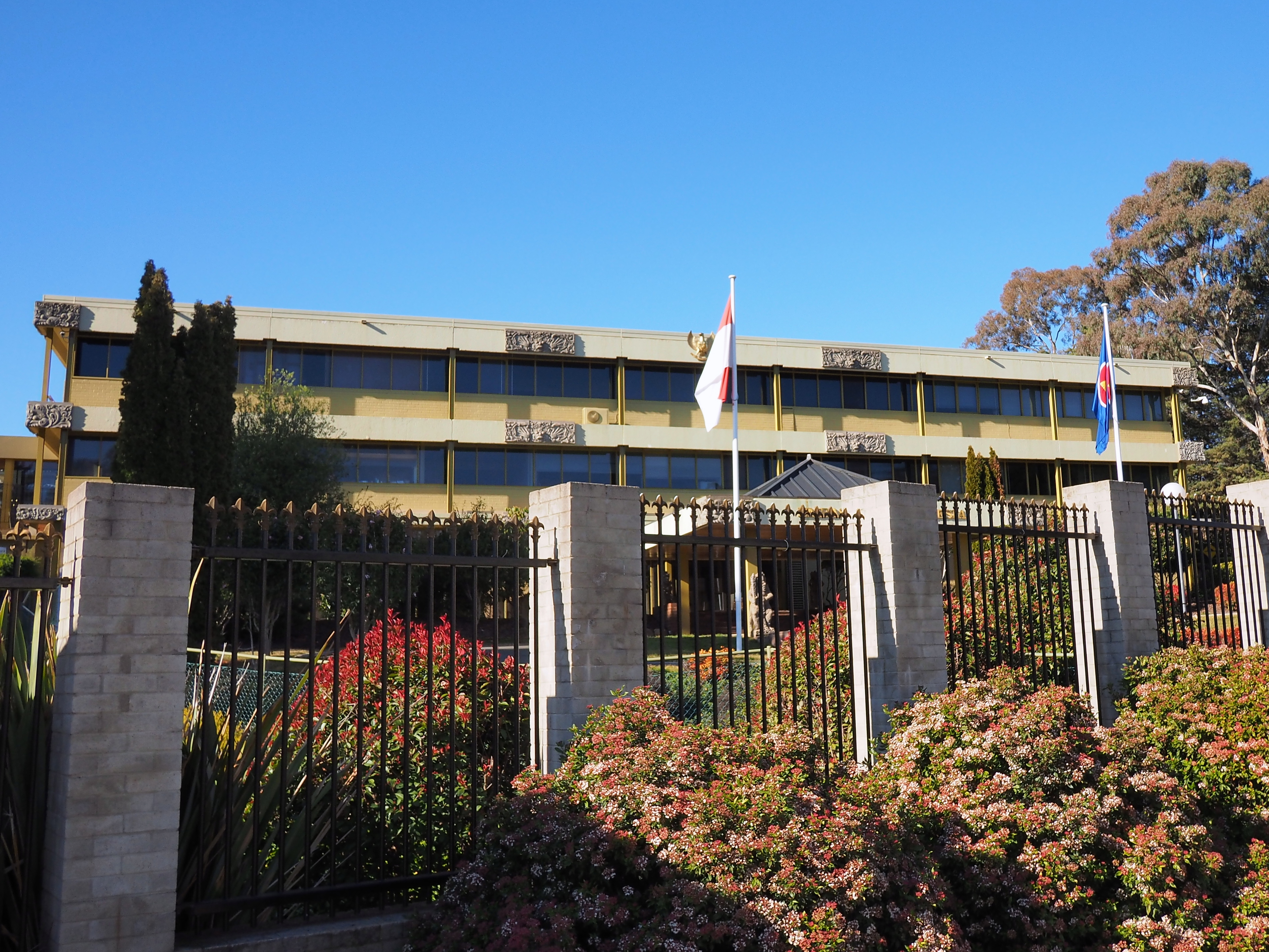
- Location: (Australia) Yarralumla, Canberra
- Address: 8 Darwin Avenue, Yarralumla, Canberra, ACT 2600, Australia
- Coordinates: 35°18′14.5″S 149°6′59.9″E
- Ambassador: Siswo Pramono
- Jurisdiction: Australia; Vanuatu
- Website: kbri-canberra.go.id kemlu.go.id/canberra/en/

The Embassy of the Republic of Indonesia in Canberra (Indonesian: Kedutaan Besar Republik Indonesia di Canberra) is the diplomatic mission of Indonesia in Australia, which also doubles as the former's mission to Vanuatu. The current ambassador, Siswo Pramono, took office in October 2021.

Consulate Generals of Indonesia are also present in the cities of Sydney, Melbourne, Perth and Darwin.

== History ==
Indonesia's first representative in Australia, Usman Sastroamidjojo, was assigned in June 1947 during the Indonesian National Revolution as "chief of the diplomatic and consular service for the Indonesian Republic". Initially located in Melbourne, the representation moved to Canberra in 1949, moving from Hotel Canberra to Deakin before permanently establishing itself in the current embassy location at Yarralumla in August 1971. The building itself had commenced construction since January 1970. The original building was designed by George Holland, and featured a display pavilion called "Wisma Wista Budaya". An additional office block was constructed between 1983 and 1984. A second display hall, named "Balai Kartini" after Kartini, was completed in 1986.

The embassy was targeted by a bioterrorism hoax in 2005 during the trial of Schapelle Corby. In 2015, a week after the executions of Andrew Chan and Myuran Sukumaran, a HAZMAT team was called to the embassy due to presence of a suspicious package containing white powder.

== Gallery ==
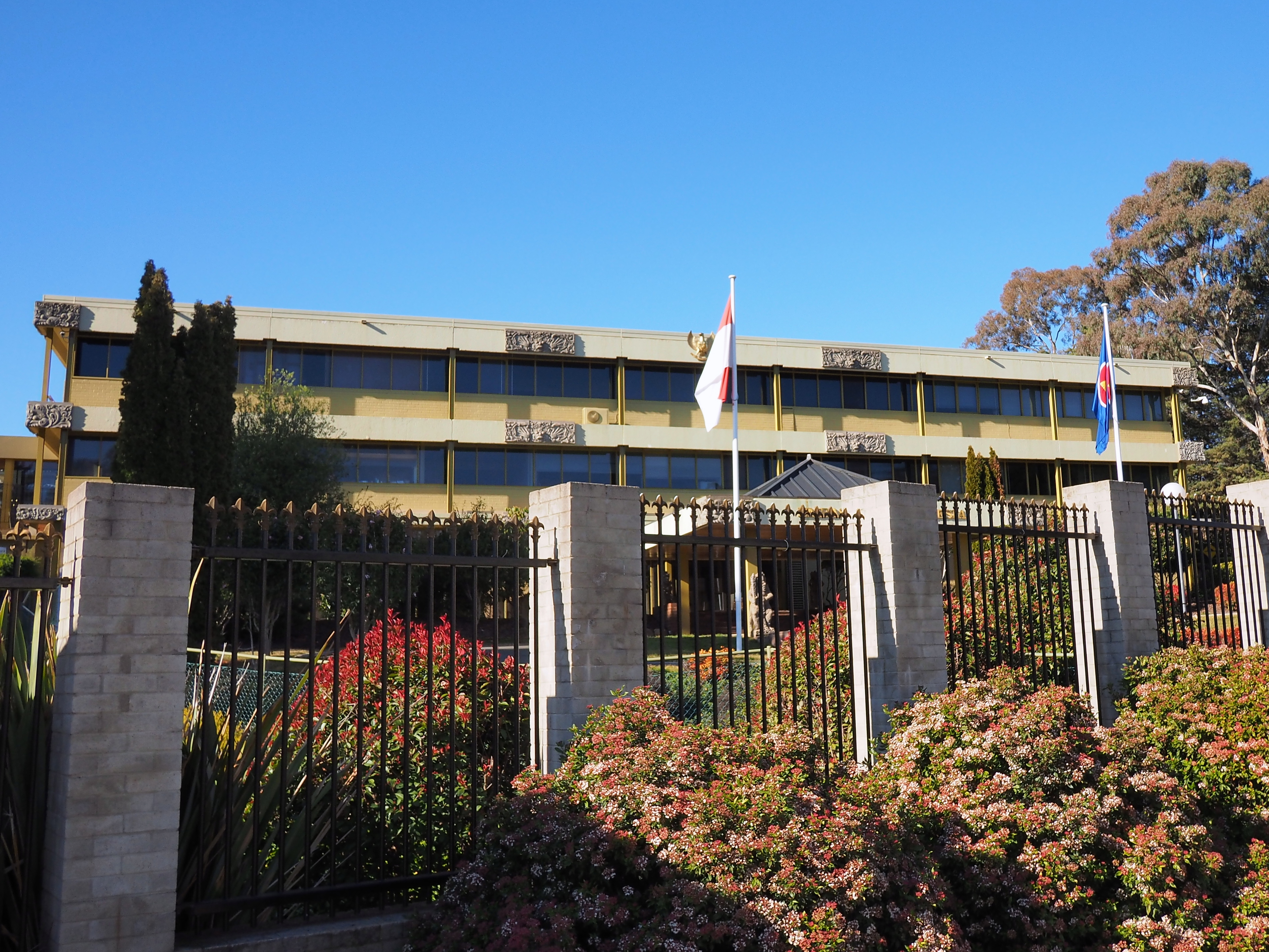
The embassy in July 2014

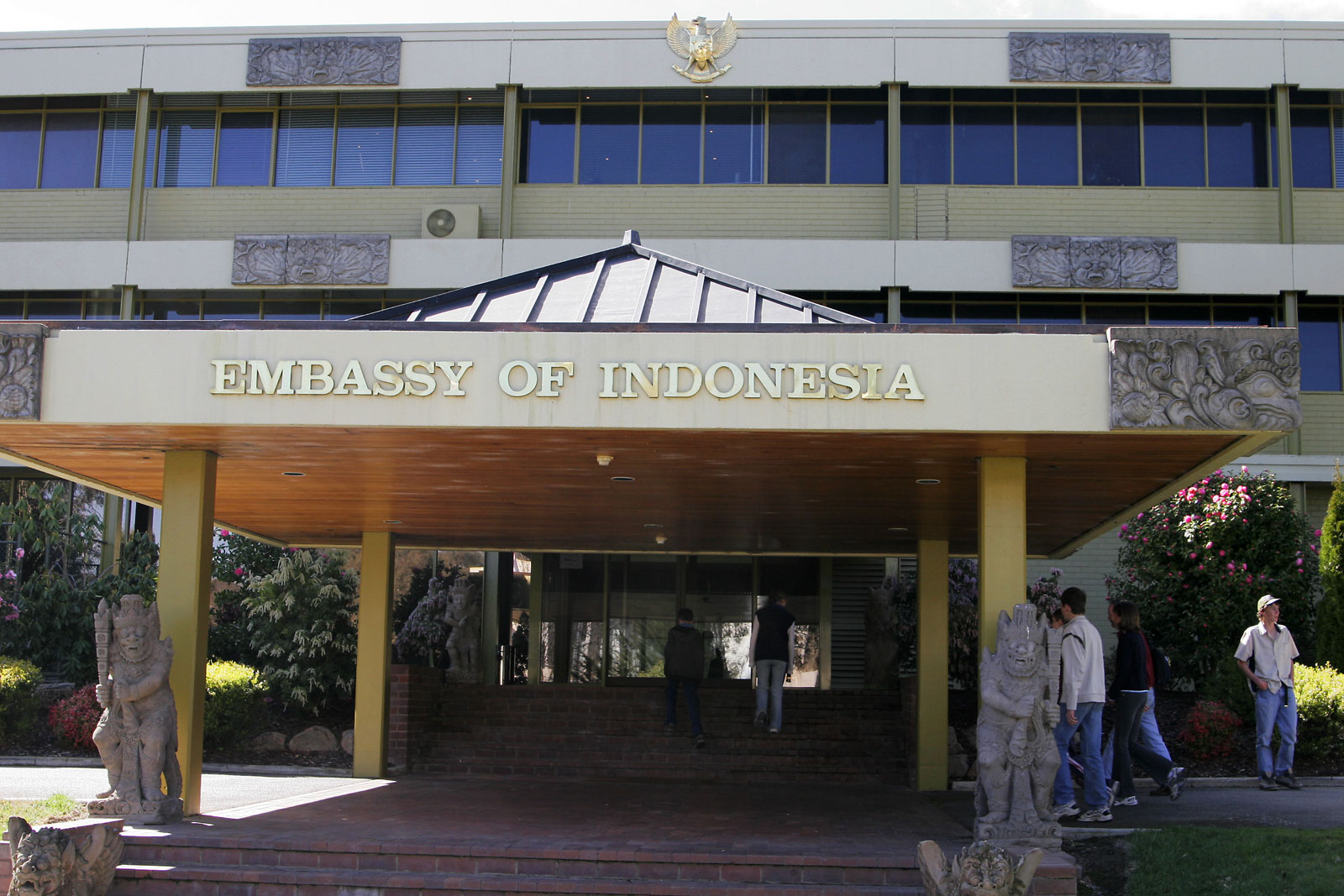
Entrance of the embassy

== See also ==
- Australia–Indonesia relations
- Indonesian ambassadors to Australia
- Embassy of Australia, Jakarta
- Australian ambassadors to Indonesia
- Australian Consulate-General, Surabaya
- Consuls-General of Australia
- Diplomatic missions in Australia
- Diplomatic missions of Indonesia
