= Sabam Siagian =

Indonesian journalist

- Born: 4 May 1932; Batavia, Dutch East Indies
- Died: 3 June 2016 (aged 84); Jakarta, Indonesia
- Occupations: Journalist, diplomat

Sabam Pandapotan Siagian (4 May 1932 – 3 June 2016) was an Indonesian journalist. He served as the first editor in chief of The Jakarta Post. Siagian departed the Jakarta Post in 1991 upon his appointment as Ambassador of Indonesia to Australia.

From 1991 to 1995, while ambassador, Sabam lived in Canberra. He criticised the Australian media for lagging behind other sectors in Australia when it came to engaging with Indonesia.

After leaving Canberra in 1995, Sabam joined the board of The Jakarta Post.

Sabam died in Jakarta on 3 June 2016 after extended health complications. Numerous colleagues, including former Indonesian foreign minister Hassan Wirajuda, paid tribute to his contributions during a long career as a journalist in Indonesia.

Diplomatic posts
Preceded by Roesman	Ambassador of Indonesia to Australia; 1991–1995	Succeeded by Wiryono Sastrohandoyo
