= Australia–Indonesia relations =

- Australia: Indonesia

Diplomatic mission
- Embassy of Australia, Jakarta: Embassy of Indonesia, Canberra

Envoy
- Ambassador Roderick Bruce Brazier: Ambassador Siswo Pramono

Australia–Indonesia relations are the foreign relations between Australia and Indonesia. The two neighbouring countries share an extensive maritime boundary and have a history of contact predating European colonisation. In the 18th century, seafarers from Makassar, Sulawesi made regular voyages to northern Australia to collect trepang (sea cucumbers), and these trips brought them into contact with Australia's Aboriginal communities.

During Indonesia's war of independence against the Netherlands, Australian maritime unions supported the Indonesian Republic through the boycott of Dutch shipping, and the Australian government backed the Indonesian Republic diplomatically and represented it on the United Nations Security Council. Following the transfer of sovereignty from the Netherlands in December 1949, Australia formally recognised the Republic of Indonesia.

Relations afterwards alternated between cooperation and serious disputes. Concerning the territory of western New Guinea, Australia initially supported continued Dutch control. Australian forces later fought Indonesian troops during the Indonesia–Malaysia confrontation in the 1960s. Indonesia's invasion and occupation of East Timor became a major source of strain after 1975, although political, economic and security ties expanded under president Suharto and successive Australian prime ministers.

Relations reached a low point during the East Timor crisis in 1999, when Australia led an international force deployed after East Timor's independence referendum. Cooperation was rebuilt during the following decade, helped by joint responses to terrorism and the 2004 Indian Ocean earthquake and tsunami. The Lombok Treaty in 2006 established a new framework for security cooperation and included commitments on sovereignty, territorial integrity and non-interference.

The relationship has since become more institutionalised, although occasional disagreements remain. Indonesian–Australian cooperation includes defence, counter-terrorism, policing, maritime security, disaster management and intelligence sharing. Relations were disrupted in 2013 by revelations of Australian surveillance of President Susilo Bambang Yudhoyono and other Indonesian political figures, and later disputes have included capital punishment in Indonesia, asylum-seeker policy, West Papua, and Australian defence policy.

The governments established a Comprehensive Strategic Partnership in 2018, followed by the Indonesia–Australia Comprehensive Economic Partnership Agreement (IA-CEPA) two years later. The two countries signed a treaty-level defence agreement in 2024 and the Treaty on Common Security in 2026. Both countries also cooperate through multilateral settings, such as the G20, the Asia-Pacific Economic Cooperation, the Indian Ocean Rim Association and ASEAN-led regional forums.

Economic and social ties include trade, investment, development assistance, education, migration and tourism. Two-way trade in goods and services exceeded A$33 billion in 2025, and Indonesia is a major Australian market for wheat and live cattle. Australia maintains development programmes in Indonesia covering economic governance, infrastructure, public services, climate resilience and democratic institutions. More than 200,000 Indonesians have studied in Australia, and Indonesia has been the most popular destination under Australia's New Colombo Plan. Indonesia is the leading overseas destination for Australian residents, with Bali accounting for much of this travel. Indonesian tourism to Australia has also grown. Public opinion surveys have generally found favourable views of the other country, although there are gaps in knowledge and occasional concerns about security and political interference.

== Historical background and early contacts ==
=== Early maritime contacts ===
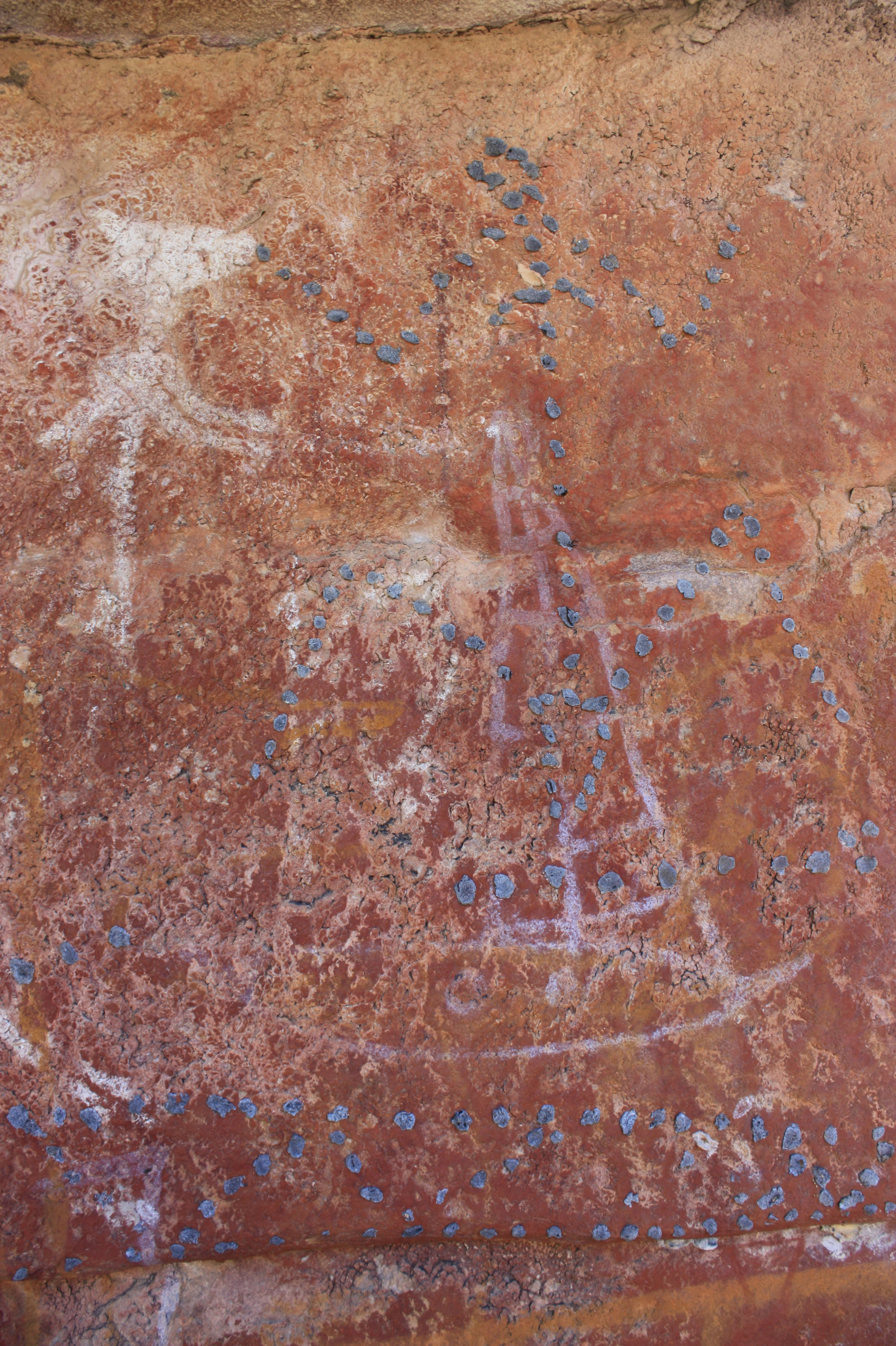
A Makassan perahu depicted in an Aboriginal rock painting.

Bugis-Portuguese writer and cartographer Manuel Godinho de Erédia included an account attributed to Chiaymasiouro, described as the king of Damuth, who said that he sailed south from Blambangan, eastern Java, and reached the port of Lucaantara after 12 days. He described the inhabitants as Javanese like those of Java, although their language was somewhat different. In a note to his English translation and commentary, historian J. V. Mills recorded competing identifications of Lucaantara with Australia or an island off its northern coast, Sumba and Madura.

By the 18th century, crews sailing from Makassar made annual voyages to northern Australia to collect and process trepang for a trade that passed through Makassar to China. This continuing fishing tradition in Australian waters is maintained by communities from eastern Indonesia, including the Bajau, Makassans, Bugis, Rotenese, Butonese and Madurese.

The earliest known written reference to trepang collection in Australia dates to 1754 and probably concerns the Kimberley coast, while exploitation of Arnhem Land waters appears to have begun around 1780. The two principal Australian fishing regions were Marege along the Arnhem Land coast and Kayu Jawa off the Kimberley. During the first half of the 19th century, between 30 and 60 praus carrying at least 1,000 crewmen reached the Northern Territory coast in a typical year.

The industry brought the visiting crews into regular contact with coastal Aboriginal communities, and some Aboriginal people travelled aboard the praus to Makassar and farther into the archipelago. At the Malarrak complex in north-western Arnhem Land, researchers identified rock paintings of a Southeast Asian prau and a Macassan-style badik. South Australian authorities ended Makassan trepanging in their waters, and the last recorded prau working the Northern Territory coast arrived for the 1906-07 season.

Makassan contact also left a linguistic legacy. A Makassan pidgin was used as a lingua franca in parts of northern Australia, while words from Makassarese and other languages used by the visiting crews entered Aboriginal languages across the Top End.

=== Colonial rule, migration, and early Australian engagement ===
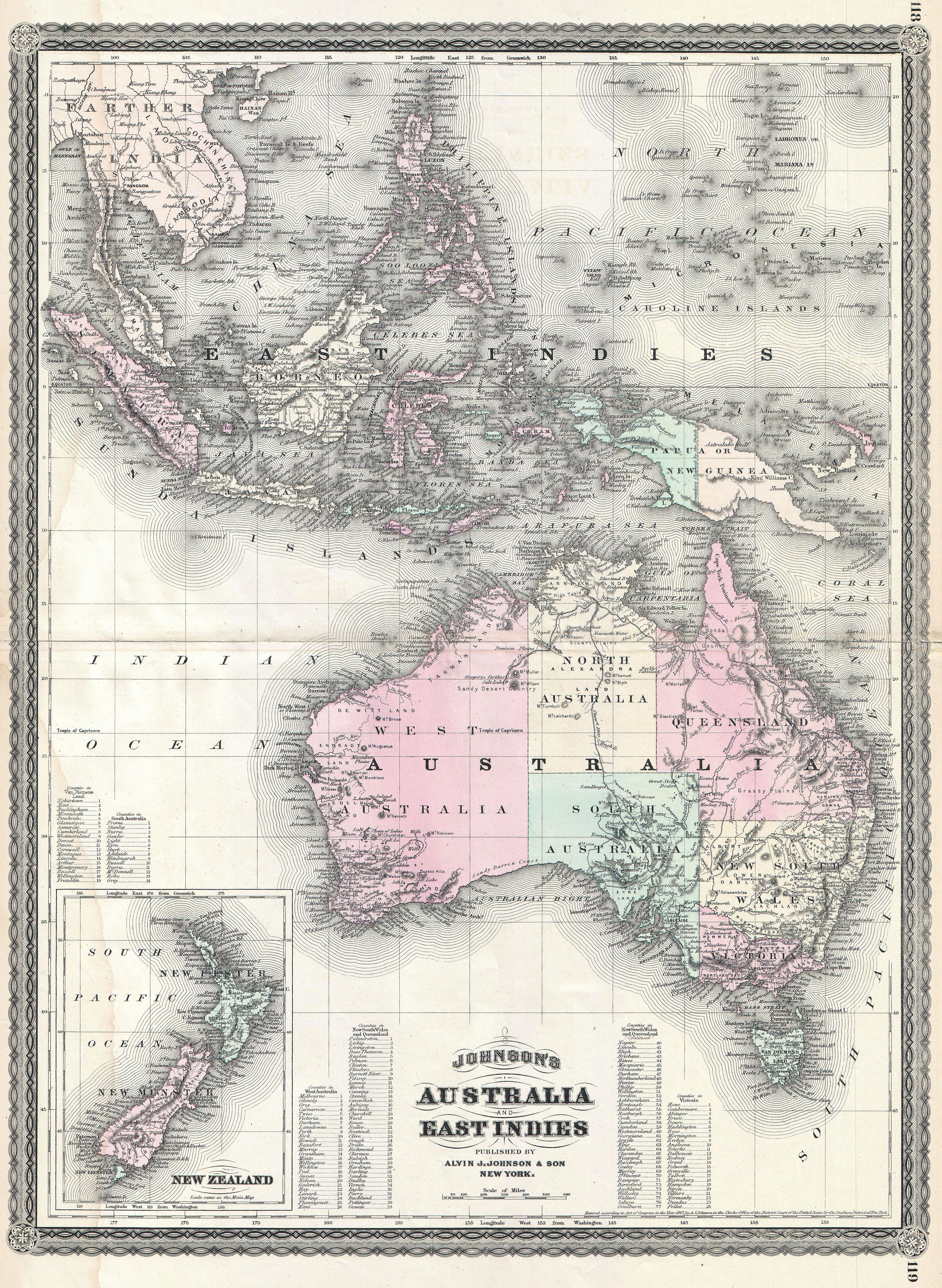
An 1870 map depicting the Dutch East Indies, Australia, and New Zealand.

From the 1870s, workers from the Dutch East Indies were recruited for the pearling and sugar-cane industries of northern Australia. At Shark Bay, the pearling workforce expanded from eight recruits brought from Batavia in 1871 to almost 1,000 by 1875. An early group of 44 workers came from Makassar and was recorded as "Malays". At Federation in 1901, around 1,000 people from what is now Indonesia lived in Australia, almost all in Queensland and Western Australia.

The Immigration Restriction Act 1901 ended the recruitment and use of Indonesian labour in northern fisheries and Queensland plantations, and most Indonesian sugar workers returned to the Indies. Pearling employers obtained an exemption from the exclusion of non-European indentured labour, and workers described as Malays, including Koepangers from Timor, continued to work around Broome, Darwin and Thursday Island.

In the early 20th century, the Dutch Royal Packet Line connected the islands of the Indies but did not run to northern Australia, while Australian regulations restricted arrivals and labour recruitment from the north. An Australian trade delegation sailed from Sydney to Batavia in 1934 and also visited Makassar. In 1935, Australia appointed Charles Critchley as its first trade commissioner in Batavia. By 1939, 5% of the Indies' trade was with Australia, and military contacts began only in late 1940.

=== World War II and Indonesian independence ===
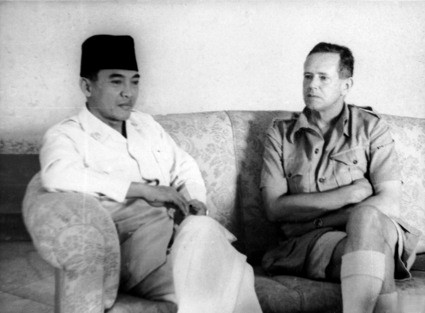
Australian Consul-General Charles Eaton meeting with Sukarno in 1947.

After Japan entered the Pacific War in December 1941, Australian troops were sent to Timor, Ambon and Java under secret arrangements with the Dutch colonial authorities. Japanese forces conquered the Dutch East Indies by March 1942, and many residents of the colony evacuated to Australia. In 1944, the Netherlands Indies Civil Administration established its government-in-exile at Camp Columbia in Brisbane and used it as a base for plans to retake and reconstruct the colony.

By the time of Japan's surrender, about 50,000 Australian troops were stationed in Borneo and eastern Indonesia. They were assigned to accept Japanese surrenders and restore Dutch authority. These duties led to conflict with Indonesian nationalists in parts of Borneo and eastern Indonesia, including South Sulawesi.

Sukarno and Mohammad Hatta proclaimed Indonesian independence on 17 August 1945, two days after Japan's surrender. Indonesian exiles in Australia formed organisations including the Komite Indonesia Merdeka and established links with the Australian Communist Party and Australian government officials. In September 1945, Australian maritime unions began a boycott of Dutch shipping in Australian waters in support of Indonesia's declaration of independence. Workers from Australia, Indonesia and India participated in the boycott, and Indian seamen formed the main group preventing blacklisted vessels from departing.

The Chifley government supported the Republic diplomatically while continuing to seek an agreed Dutch-Indonesian settlement. Its position remained cautious and conditional. Australia extended de facto recognition to the authority of the Indonesian Republic on 9 July 1947. After the Netherlands launched its first major military offensive later that month, Australia referred the conflict to the United Nations Security Council. The Netherlands chose Belgium to represent it on the Security Council's Good Offices Committee, the Republic chose Australia, and those two representatives selected the United States as the third member. The committee secured a truce and political agreement in early 1948, but negotiations broke down when the Netherlands began another offensive in December. Under the agreement reached on 2 November 1949, the Netherlands transferred sovereignty to the United States of Indonesia on 27 December, and Australia formally recognised the new state that day.

== Diplomatic history ==
=== Early relations and Western New Guinea ===
Indonesia became a full member of the Colombo Plan in 1953 after previously receiving Australian scholarships and training outside formal membership. The Indonesian government had hesitated over whether joining would compromise its foreign-policy independence, but proceeded after deciding that membership carried no political conditions. Indonesian communications minister Djuanda considered Colombo Plan assistance more useful to Indonesia despite its smaller scale than earlier American aid. Indonesian daily newspaper Abadi described relations with Australia as generally good apart from western New Guinea.

The 1949 settlement left Western New Guinea under the status quo pending further negotiations. Indonesian international-relations researcher Siswanto describes this as an incomplete transfer of sovereignty from the Netherlands to Indonesia. In contrast, Australia supported the continuation of Dutch control. On 17 August 1954, Indonesia asked for the dispute to be placed on the agenda of the United Nations General Assembly. Australia opposed this move, maintaining that the UN lacked jurisdiction.

Indonesian foreign minister Subandrio travelled to Australia in February 1959 and presented Indonesia's position, including on western New Guinea, to an Australian cabinet meeting. Prime Minister Robert Menzies visited Indonesia for seven days that December following a formal invitation from Djuanda. Djuanda's public welcome described Australia as a friendly neighbouring country. Daily newspaper Pedoman welcomed Menzies's visit but said Australia's support for Dutch sovereignty impeded warmer relations and called for Canberra to adopt a neutral position.

In January 1962, Australia stopped seeking the continuation of Dutch sovereignty of the territory. Historian Stuart Doran attributed the change to international pressure, arguing that the United States and United Kingdom had decided that Indonesia should acquire the territory despite Australian objections. The New York Agreement of August 1962 transferred the territory's administration from the Netherlands to the United Nations Temporary Executive Authority (UNTEA), which administered the territory until authority passed to Indonesia on 1 May 1963, and provided for an exercise of self-determination by 1969. From Indonesia's perspective, Siswanto describes the agreement as ending the dispute and forming part of the process of returning western New Guinea, while at the same time noting that the promised act of self-determination still had to take place.

=== Indonesian–Malaysian confrontation ===
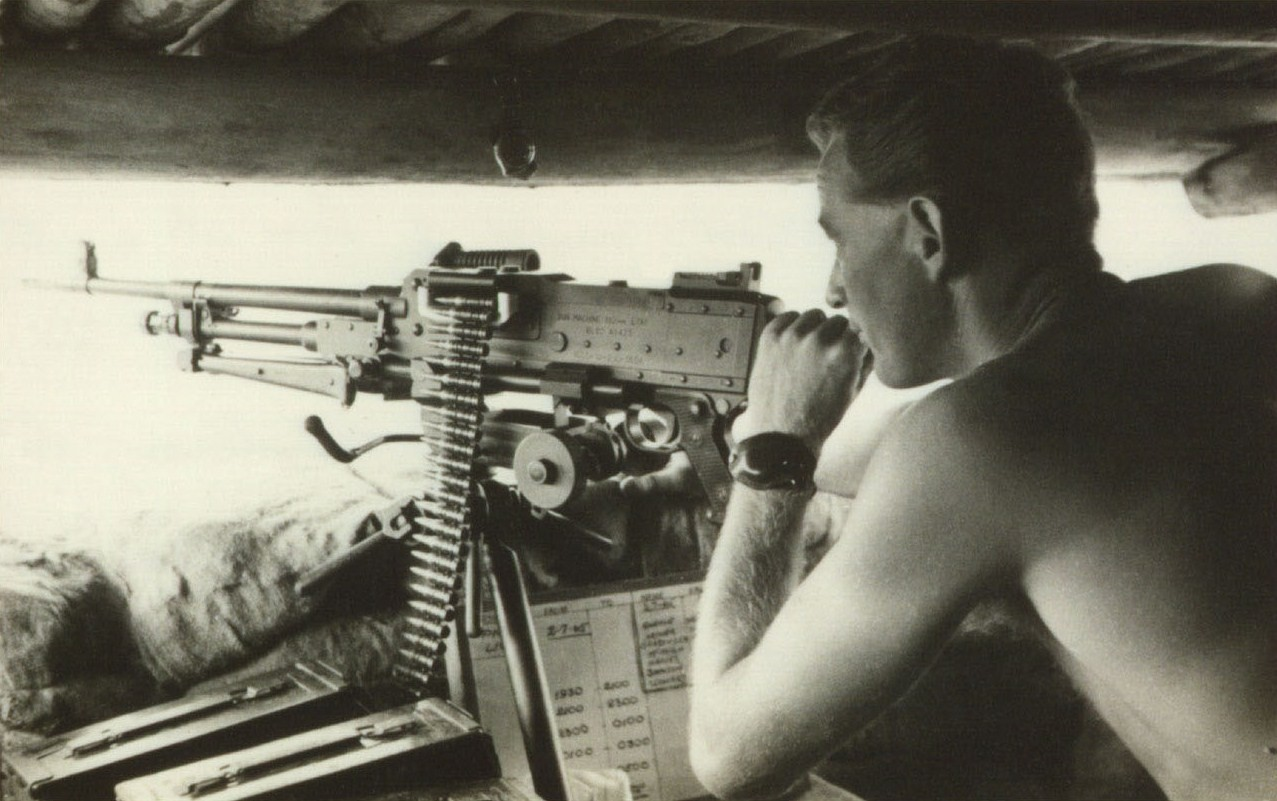
An Australian soldier on active duty during the Indonesia-Malaysia confrontation.

President Sukarno opposed the proposed federation of Malaysia, considering it as a British neo-colonial project and a potential base for Western military influence in Southeast Asia. Indonesia initially pursued a diplomatic settlement through Sukarno's meeting with Malayan prime minister Tunku Abdul Rahman in Tokyo and subsequent talks in Manila, where Indonesia accepted the federation on the condition that it reflected the wishes of the affected population.

After Malaysia was proclaimed before the UN mission's findings were released, Indonesia severed diplomatic relations and intensified its campaign against the federation. Australia supported Malaysia but initially refused British and Malaysian requests to deploy troops to Borneo because it feared that the conflict could spread to the border between Indonesia and Australian-administered Papua New Guinea. Meeting Sukarno in September 1963, Minister for External Affairs Garfield Barwick said Australia would support Malaysia and the UK and warned that Indonesian training of subversives was endangering Australian goodwill.

Indonesian airborne and amphibious raids on Peninsular Malaysia in September and October 1964 brought Australian troops into operations against the raiders. Canberra approved the deployment of an Australian battalion to Borneo in January 1965, and the 3rd Battalion, Royal Australian Regiment took over a sector in Sarawak on 22 March. Australian units also carried out secret cross-border operations inside Indonesian territory under the codename Operation Claret.

Despite the conflict, Australia maintained the aviation telecommunications project and continued direct communication with Jakarta. As Sukarno lost power after 1965, the Indonesian government moved towards ending the conflict. Indonesia and Malaysia announced a settlement on 28 May 1966, and Konfrontasi formally ended in August.

=== The New Order and East Timor ===
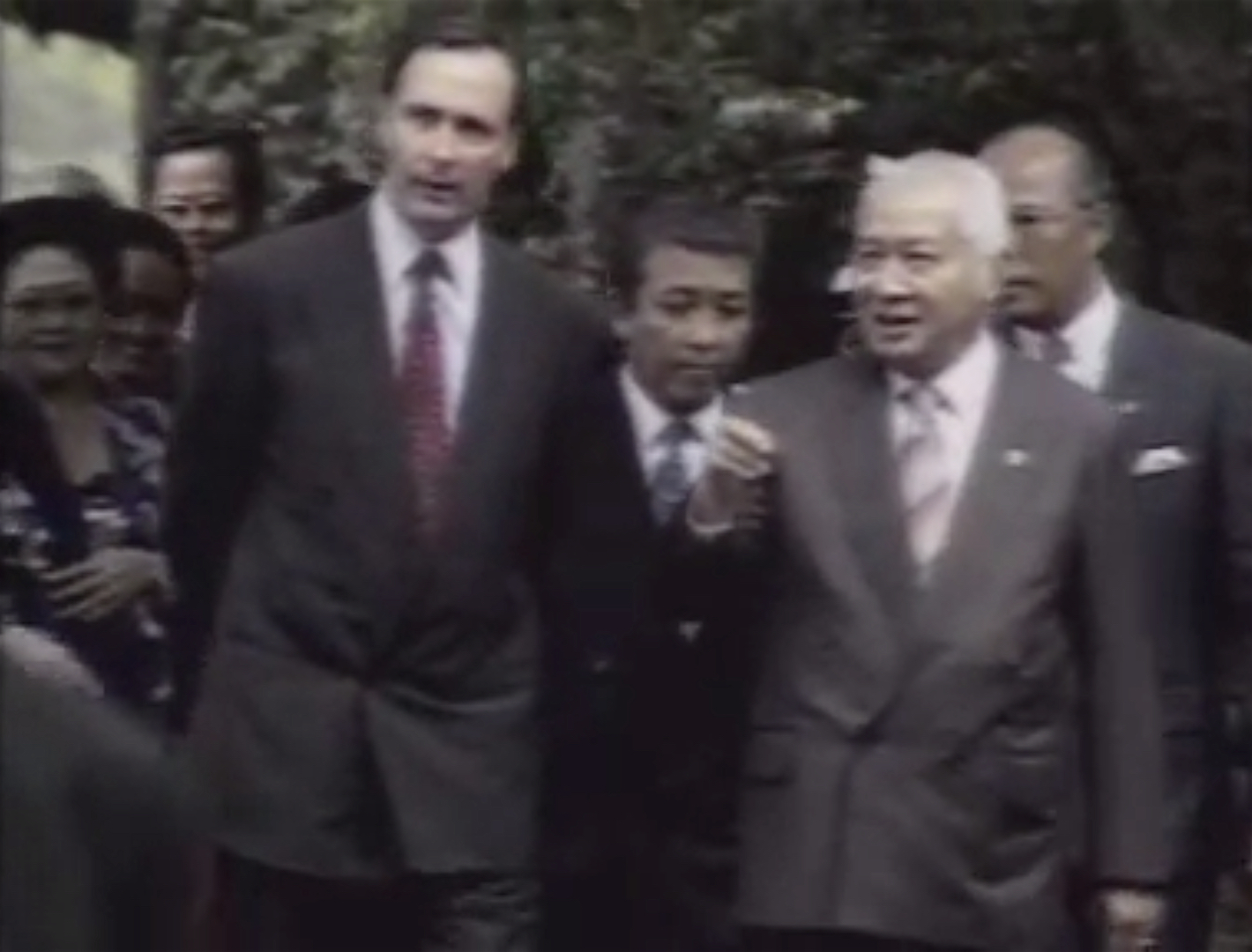
Paul Keating and Suharto during Keating's visit to Indonesia in April 1992.

The transition from Sukarno to Suharto brought an improvement in Australia–Indonesia relations, but East Timor became a major dispute. During talks with Prime Minister Gough Whitlam in September 1974, President Suharto said that decolonisation in Portuguese Timor should not endanger Indonesian or regional security and that Indonesia hoped for incorporation if it reflected the wishes of the territory's population. Whitlam said that Portuguese Timor should become part of Indonesia, but only in accordance with the wishes expressed by its people.

The New Order also conducted a diplomatic campaign to obtain international support for Indonesian intervention. In a 2021 study in Modern Asian Studies, historian Mattias Fibiger concluded that the campaign strengthened officials favouring annexation over those urging restraint. Indonesia later invaded East Timor in 1975 and on 17 July 1976 enacted Law No. 7, which formalised what Indonesian law termed the territory's unification with the republic and established the province of Timor Timur. The United Nations did not recognise the incorporation.

By October 1976, Indonesian officials had made clear to the Malcolm Fraser government that continued Australian criticism of the incorporation would be regarded as hostility towards Indonesia. Indonesian justice minister Mochtar Kusumaatmadja indicated that Indonesia was prepared to negotiate the remaining seabed boundary on terms comparable to the 1972 agreement if Australia recognised Indonesian sovereignty over East Timor. When Australia extended de facto recognition to Indonesian control on 20 January 1978, Foreign Minister Andrew Peacock said that the government remained critical of the way integration had occurred. The Timor Gap Treaty, signed in December 1989, provisionally established a joint regime for petroleum exploration and development in the seabed area between Australia and East Timor where the two countries had competing claims.

In 1992, Suharto and Prime Minister Paul Keating agreed to establish the Australia–Indonesia Ministerial Forum, bringing ministers from a wider range of government portfolios into regular bilateral meetings. East Timor nevertheless remained contentious in the relationship. In July 1995, Indonesia cancelled the appointment of Herman Mantiri as ambassador to Australia amid Australian public opposition to his defence of the troops involved in the 1991 Dili massacre.

In December 1995, the governments signed the Agreement on Maintaining Security, providing for regular ministerial consultations on common security, consultations when either country faced an adverse security challenge, and further cooperative activity in the security field. Writing for Universitas Islam Indonesia's Department of International Relations, Indonesian lecturer Hangga Fathana later noted that Indonesia had not previously concluded a bilateral security agreement and argued that the pact complemented existing military cooperation, while also recording concerns in Indonesia about its regional implications.

=== Asian financial crisis and New Order collapse ===
By April 1998, the Indonesian government reported that the depreciation of the rupiah and a severe drought had driven large price increases, while the financial position of the banking system had deteriorated sharply and foreign banks had reduced trade and other credit lines to Indonesian banks and businesses. As Indonesia pursued an IMF-supported adjustment programme, Australia undertook to provide up to US$1 billion if required through a government-to-government loan and used its representation on the executive boards of the International Monetary Fund, Asian Development Bank and World Bank, as well as ministerial representations, to participate in negotiations over the programme.

President Suharto resigned on 21 May and was succeeded by Vice-President B. J. Habibie. The new government told the IMF that restoring the distribution of food and other necessities and restructuring the banking system were its most urgent priorities, and that Indonesia would require further international financial support during the recovery. Australia's 1998–99 aid budget allocated A$20 million in humanitarian assistance to Indonesia from a A$30 million package announced in May, including food and medical assistance, drought relief and employment-generation activities.

Prime Minister John Howard welcomed the constitutional transfer of power and said that Australia would cooperate fully with Habibie's administration, while maintaining that the pace of political change was for Indonesians to determine. Indonesian political scientist Priyambudi Sulistiyanto wrote in a 2010 article in the Australian Journal of Political Science that democratic government after 1998 was accompanied by greater public interest in Indonesia in debating the importance and complexity of relations with Australia.

=== Reformasi and the post-1999 recovery ===
After the fall of the New Order, bilateral relations reached their lowest point during the 1999 East Timor crisis. Under agreements signed by Indonesia and Portugal on 5 May 1999, the United Nations organised a vote on whether East Timor should accept autonomy within Indonesia. In the ballot on 30 August, 78.5% of voters rejected autonomy and supported a transition towards independence. Pro-integration militias, at times supported by elements of the Indonesian security forces, then carried out widespread violence, and Indonesia accepted international assistance on 12 September.

The United Nations Security Council authorised an Australian-led multinational non-UN peacemaking task force, the International Force East Timor, to re-establish security, assist and protect the UN mission, and enable humanitarian aid. Indonesia abrogated the 1995 security agreement on 16 September, and relations became strained. Indonesian news agency ANTARA later described the cancellation as retaliation for Australia's involvement after the East Timor ballot. On 19 October, Indonesia's People's Consultative Assembly accepted the ballot result and repealed the decree that had incorporated East Timor into Indonesia.

Official contact was gradually restored in 2000–01, with both governments stressing mutual respect and cooperation in practical fields. President Abdurrahman Wahid's visit to Australia in June 2001 completed the first phase of that rebuilding. The two defence ministries resumed informal meetings in 2001, after most defence cooperation other than military education had stopped during the 1999 crisis. The bombings and disasters of 2002–05 widened practical cooperation, especially in law enforcement and security.

In April 2005, the governments declared a Comprehensive Partnership and described cooperation between the Australian Defence Force and the Indonesian National Armed Forces after the tsunami as a "psychological breakthrough". The Lombok Treaty, signed on 13 November 2006, placed cooperation on conventional and non-conventional security matters within a treaty framework. Indonesian foreign minister Hassan Wirajuda said that the treaty was intended to reduce the suspicions that had repeatedly affected the relationship and to bind commitments on sovereignty, territorial integrity and non-support for separatist activity.

=== 21st-century relations ===
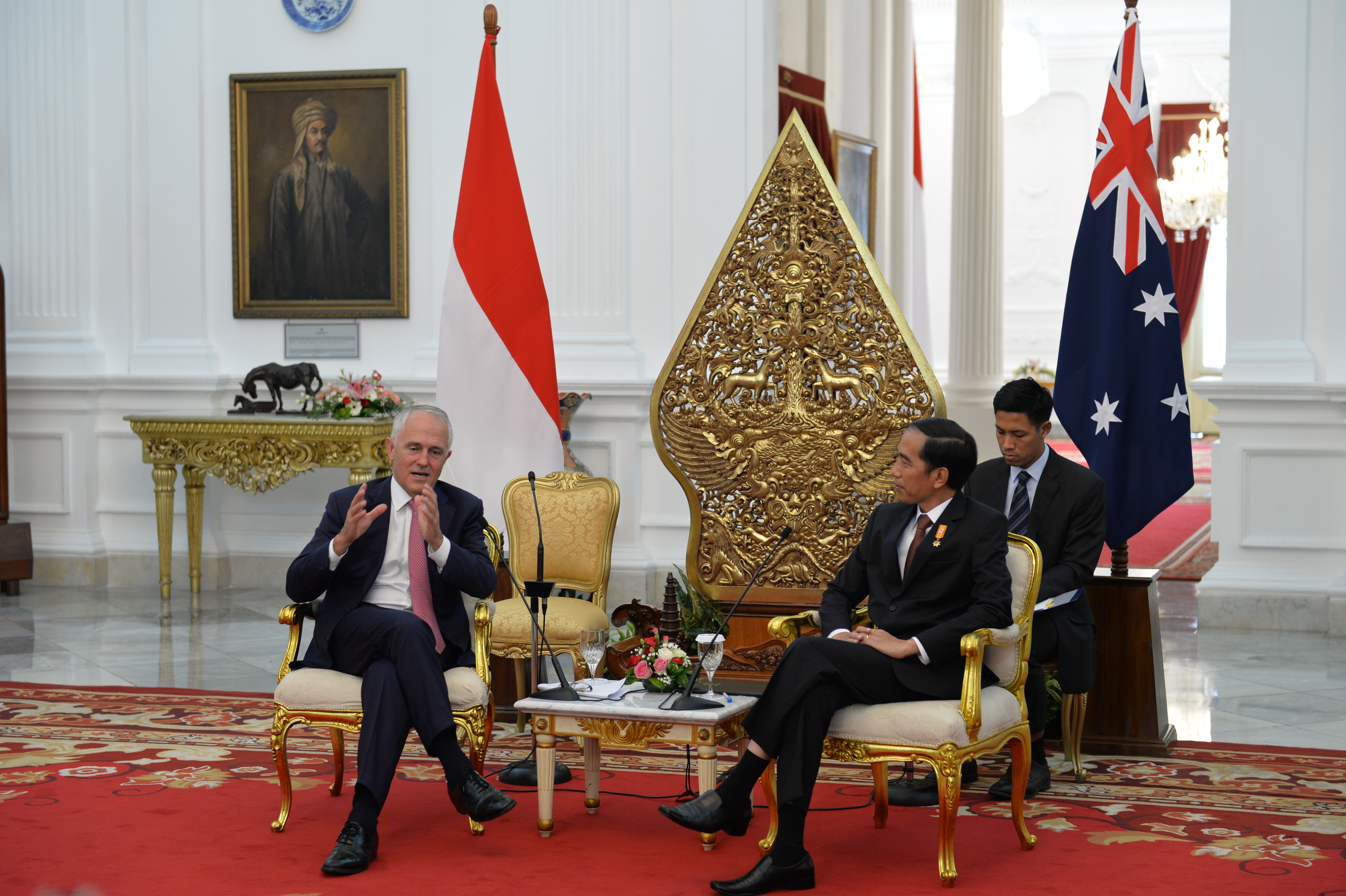
Prime Minister Malcolm Turnbull and President Joko Widodo in Jakarta, 2015

Relations worsened in November 2013 after reports that Australian intelligence had targeted the mobile phones of President Susilo Bambang Yudhoyono, his wife and senior associates. Indonesia recalled its ambassador and suspended intelligence exchanges, joint military exercises and coordinated operations and patrols against people smuggling. In August 2014, the governments signed a code of conduct under the Lombok Treaty governing the use of intelligence and providing for cooperation between their intelligence agencies.

Relations were strained again in April 2015 when Indonesia executed Australian citizens Andrew Chan and Myuran Sukumaran, after which Australia withdrew its ambassador. In late 2016, Indonesia suspended joint exercises and officer exchanges after a Kopassus instructor found training material at an Australian military base that Indonesian officials considered insulting to Pancasila, although military-training cooperation was resumed months later.

The governments established a Comprehensive Strategic Partnership on 31 August 2018, organising the relationship around economic development, people-to-people connections, shared security, maritime cooperation, and regional stability and prosperity. The Indonesia–Australia Comprehensive Economic Partnership Agreement took effect on 5 July 2020. Differences over regional security remained. At the first ASEAN–Australia Summit in October 2021, President Joko Widodo said that Indonesia was concerned that AUKUS and the development of Australia's nuclear-powered submarines could heighten regional rivalry.

On 29 August 2024, the countries signed a treaty-level defence agreement permitting more advanced joint activities, greater interoperability and mutually approved operations from either country's territory. That agreement was followed by the Treaty on Common Security, signed by Prime Minister Anthony Albanese and President Prabowo Subianto on 6 February 2026. It provides for regular consultations on common security and requires the governments to consult when either faces an adverse security challenge, but leaving any response to each country's own processes.

== Diplomatic framework ==
=== Diplomatic representations ===
Australia's diplomatic network in Indonesia comprises its Jakarta embassy and consulates-general in Bali, Makassar and Surabaya. Indonesia maintains an embassy in Canberra, consulates-general in Sydney, Melbourne and Perth, and a consulate in Darwin.

=== Leadership diplomacy ===
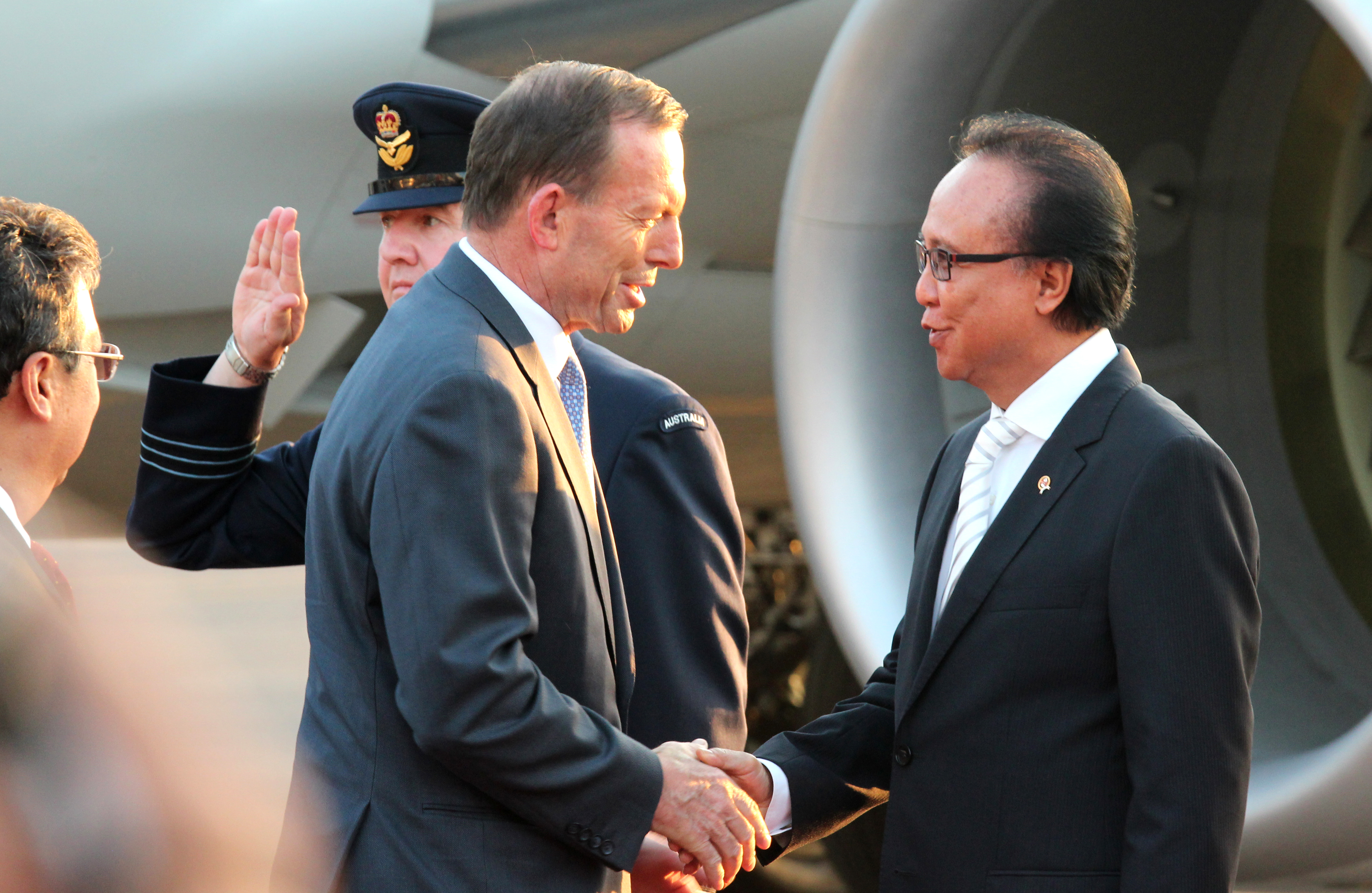
Prime Minister Tony Abbott on arrival in Bali for the 2013 APEC summit.

Paul Keating, Kevin Rudd, Tony Abbott and Scott Morrison each made Indonesia their first overseas destination after becoming prime minister. During Joko Widodo's 2020 state visit to Australia, he attended the Annual Leaders' Meeting, and his government identified implementation of IA-CEPA to increase access to the Australian market and Australian investment in Indonesia, stronger Australian support for Indonesia as a unitary state, and development cooperation in the Indo-Pacific and South Pacific as objectives of the visit. During Anthony Albanese's May 2025 visit to Jakarta, President Prabowo Subianto said that the trip came just one day after Albanese had been sworn in following his re-election, called the visit an honour for Indonesia, and described Australia as a strategic partner.

Regular high-level meetings include the Annual Leaders' Meeting, the foreign and defence ministers' 2+2 meeting and the Ministerial Council on Law and Security. At the Annual Leaders' Meeting in Jakarta on 15 May 2025, Prabowo and Albanese witnessed their foreign ministers sign the renewed 2025–29 Plan of Action and noted ministerial, special-envoy and other senior-level visits since the previous meeting in 2023. Under the Plan of Action, the two foreign ministers are to give the leaders an annual implementation report assembled jointly through senior-official and ministerial meetings.

=== Bilateral treaties and agreements ===
The 2006 Lombok Treaty places conventional and non-conventional security cooperation on a treaty basis and commits each country to respect the other's sovereignty and territorial integrity, maintain neighbourly relations and avoid intervention in domestic affairs.Under the 2014 Joint Understanding, intelligence, surveillance and related resources could not be employed against the other country's interests, while the two sides undertook to cooperate through their relevant agencies.

On 31 August 2018, the governments created a Comprehensive Strategic Partnership with five fields, economic development, people-to-people connections, shared security, maritime affairs, and regional stability and prosperity.The 2025–29 Plan of Action translates those five fields into activities but expressly has no binding legal effect.

Particular sectors are covered by separate instruments, including the Indonesia–Australia Comprehensive Economic Partnership Agreement, which took effect on 5 July 2020.At Magelang on 29 August 2024, the defence ministers signed a treaty-level agreement whose scope includes maritime affairs, counter-terrorism, disaster response, logistics, military education and the defence industry.The agreement had not commenced as of August 2026 because Indonesia had yet to complete its domestic procedures.Signed in Jakarta on 6 February 2026, the Treaty on Common Security establishes routine discussions on shared security and consultation when either country encounters an adverse security challenge.

=== Multilateral cooperation ===
Australia and Indonesia have agreed to strengthen coordination in the United Nations, the G20, the World Trade Organization, Asia-Pacific Economic Cooperation, the Indian Ocean Rim Association and ASEAN-led forums including the East Asia Summit, ASEAN Regional Forum and ASEAN Defence Ministers' Meeting-Plus.The plan also covers joint work on UN peace operations and post-conflict rebuilding, international candidacies, and the Women, Peace and Security agenda.

For ASEAN-led cooperation, the Plan of Action affirms ASEAN's regional security role, records Indonesia's service as Australia's ASEAN country coordinator for 2024–27, and provides for work under the ASEAN–Australia Comprehensive Strategic Partnership and the ASEAN Outlook on the Indo-Pacific.At the fifth ASEAN–Australia Summit in October 2025, Indonesian foreign minister Sugiono proposed closer ties in education, sport and the arts, together with cooperation on food security, public health, critical minerals and energy.

Australia, the United Kingdom and the United States announced AUKUS in September 2021 as a security partnership. Its first major initiative was to support Australia in acquiring conventionally armed, nuclear-powered submarines. At the first ASEAN–Australia Summit on 27 October 2021, President Joko Widodo said Indonesia was concerned that AUKUS and the development of Australia's nuclear-powered submarines could heighten regional rivalry. He said Indonesia hoped Australia would remain open towards ASEAN and supported elevating ASEAN–Australia relations to a comprehensive strategic partnership.

Australia and Indonesia are members of IORA.The bilateral Plan of Action identifies IORA cooperation in safety at sea, commerce, fisheries, disaster management, tourism and culture, science, the blue economy and women's economic participation.At the 2025 Annual Leaders' Meeting, the governments welcomed the upgraded ASEAN–Australia–New Zealand Free Trade Area agreement taking effect and noted their work to implement the Regional Comprehensive Economic Partnership.

== Defence, security, and law enforcement ==
=== Defence cooperation ===
By March 2023, almost 3,300 military and civilian TNI personnel had undertaken education and training in Australia since 1967. Four Indonesian Army cadets had received 18 months of training at the Royal Military College, Duntroon, and Prabowo said he hoped more Army, Navy and Air Force cadets would study there and at the Australian Defence Force Academy. At a September 2021 meeting with Australian defence minister Peter Dutton, Prabowo described Australia as a strategic regional defence partner for Indonesia and said bilateral programmes had increased the capacity of both sides.

On 29 August 2024, the defence ministers signed a treaty-level Defence Cooperation Agreement allowing more complex joint exercises, operations from each other's territory for mutually agreed activities, continued personnel exchanges for education and training, and technical cooperation. Prabowo described the agreement as a continuation of the Lombok Treaty and said it was intended to help the neighbouring countries address security threats and promote peace and stability in the Asia-Pacific. Exercise Keris Woomera, held in East Java in November 2024, involved about 2,000 Australian and Indonesian personnel and included a joint amphibious assault, a non-combatant evacuation and live-fire operations. TNI Lieutenant General Nur Alamsyah said the exercise had improved military skills, increased mutual trust between the TNI and ADF and strengthened defence-diplomacy relations between the countries.

=== Counter-terrorism and policing ===
The 2002 Bali bombings prompted close operational cooperation between the Australian Federal Police (AFP) and the Indonesian National Police (Polri), combining capacity building with direct operational support. The Jakarta Centre for Law Enforcement Cooperation (JCLEC), a joint Polri-AFP initiative inaugurated in 2004 at a purpose-built facility in the Indonesian police academy, reached its 40,000th participant in 2023. During a 2022 visit, AFP Commissioner Reece Kershaw met the leaders of Polri, the National Narcotics Board (BNN) and Densus 88 to discuss cooperation and intelligence sharing.At their tenth counter-terrorism consultation in 2025, the governments decided to expand JCLEC training and civil-society involvement, alongside seminars, shared research and information exchanges.

AFP assistance to Densus 88 has included investigative and forensic support, while the AFP stated that it did not take part in tactical counter-terrorism operations by the Indonesian police.Densus 88 has been accused of killing suspects outside judicial process, using torture and denying terrorism suspects their legal rights.The AFP said JCLEC courses incorporated human rights and used practical scenarios to address police accountability.

=== Maritime security and border cooperation ===
The countries' shared maritime boundary is the longest in the world. Australia and Indonesia signed seabed-boundary agreements in 1971 and 1972, with the second supplementing the first in the Timor and Arafura seas; both entered into force on 8 November 1973. Under the 2018 Comprehensive Strategic Partnership, the countries undertook to carry out their 2017 maritime declaration and act against maritime crime, including illegal, unreported and unregulated fishing (IUU fishing).Since 2007, joint fisheries surveillance has been organised through the Indonesia-Australia Fisheries Surveillance Forum. In 2024, the countries held public-information campaigns in East Nusa Tenggara and Southeast Sulawesi as part of efforts to prevent traditional Indonesian fishers from crossing the maritime boundary.

Operation Gannet, first held in 2018, involves the Indonesian Maritime Security Agency (Bakamla) and Indonesia's fisheries surveillance directorate, together with the Australian Border Force (ABF) and Australian Fisheries Management Authority (AFMA), in patrols aimed at detecting illegal activity at sea and improving interoperability. Operation Horizon Watch in May 2026 used aircraft, patrol vessels and personnel from Indonesia's fisheries surveillance directorate, the ABF and AFMA to combat IUU fishing in border waters.At the January 2026 law and security ministerial meeting, the governments decided that the Jawline-Arafura and Gannet patrols would continue.They also agreed to deepen cooperation between border agencies and share intelligence concerning human trafficking, people smuggling and the illegal drug trade.

=== Intelligence cooperation and disputes ===
The 2025-29 bilateral action plan directs the relevant law-enforcement, security and intelligence bodies to exchange information regularly about transnational matters and threats to sovereignty.

Documents reported in November 2013 indicated that Australian intelligence had attempted to listen to a telephone conversation involving President Susilo Bambang Yudhoyono and had targeted phones used by his wife and members of his inner circle. Indonesia recalled its ambassador from Canberra for consultations after the Foreign Ministry expressed disappointment. On 19 November, Prime Minister Tony Abbott told Parliament that Australia collected intelligence to protect the country and "should not be expected to apologise" for steps taken for that purpose. He said that Australian information was used to help rather than harm friends and allies. Abbott also expressed "deep respect" for Indonesia, described Yudhoyono as one of Australia's closest friends, regretted the embarrassment caused by the reports and called Indonesia Australia's "most important single relationship".

Yudhoyono said that he could not understand why Australia would monitor a partner and friend when the countries were neither confronting one another nor in a hostile relationship. He temporarily suspended intelligence and information exchanges, joint military exercises and coordinated military operations and patrols connected with people smuggling, and sought a binding protocol and code of conduct for future cooperation. After receiving Prime Minister Tony Abbott's reply, Yudhoyono set out six steps before military and police cooperation could resume, including talks on sensitive issues, agreement and approval of the code, a period for observing compliance and the restoration of Indonesian trust.

On 28 August 2014, the foreign ministers signed a joint understanding under the Lombok Treaty that barred either country from using intelligence, surveillance capabilities or other resources against the other's interests and provided for cooperation between their intelligence agencies. Foreign minister Marty Natalegawa said that the understanding would return intelligence relations to a more positive course and restore communication between the armed forces.

After a Kopassus instructor found training material at Campbell Barracks that Indonesian officials considered insulting to Pancasila, the Indonesian military suspended joint exercises and officer exchanges in mid-December 2016. On 5 January, coordinating minister Wiranto said that the suspension was temporary, applied to an Indonesian-language training programme at an Australian special-forces unit and did not end defence cooperation as a whole.

Indonesian foreign minister Retno Marsudi later said that parts of military education and training remained suspended pending completion of the Australian investigation and a review of its military-training curriculum. Australian defence minister Marise Payne apologised, expressed regret and said that the incident would be investigated fully, and Indonesian defence minister Ryamizard Ryacudu said that Indonesia had accepted the apology. On 26 February, President Joko Widodo and Prime Minister Malcolm Turnbull agreed to resume military-training cooperation.

== Economic relations ==
=== Trade and investment ===
Monthly value (A$ millions) of Australian imports from Indonesia since 1988

Monthly value (A$ millions) of Australian merchandise exports to Indonesia since 1988

In 2025, Australian goods and services exports to Indonesia were valued at A$15.81 billion, while imports from Indonesia were valued at A$17.35 billion. Australia's leading exports were wheat, education-related travel and coal, while its leading imports were recreational travel, aluminium ores and concentrates including alumina, and footwear. Australia accounted for 1.3% of Indonesia's merchandise exports and ranked seventeenth among its export destinations, while it supplied 3.9% of Indonesia's merchandise imports and ranked sixth among its import sources. Indonesian non-oil-and-gas exports to Australia increased by 60.58% in 2024.

The strategy's 2022 estimates placed Indonesia as Southeast Asia's largest economy and projected it to retain that position in 2040. For 2022, the strategy reported Australia's two-way trade in goods and services at A$52.9 billion with Singapore, A$33.5 billion with Malaysia, A$27.7 billion with Thailand, A$25.7 billion with Vietnam and A$23.3 billion with Indonesia.

In 2025, the stock of Australian investment in Indonesia was valued at A$6.86 billion, including A$1.95 billion in direct investment, while Indonesian investment in Australia was valued at A$1.11 billion, including A$39 million in direct investment. In June 2026, the Indonesian government invited Australian investment in downstream processing, infrastructure, food security, the energy transition and the green economy. A 2026 Indonesian government policy brief stated that IA-CEPA had increased investment in both directions, particularly in mining, but called for more investment in higher-value and sustainable sectors.

Australia's two-way trade with the Association of Southeast Asian Nations was valued at A$197.4 billion in 2025. Indonesia, Malaysia, Singapore, Thailand and Vietnam were among Australia's 15 largest trading partners that year.

A Department of Foreign Affairs and Trade investment prospectus described Australian investment in Indonesia as "underdone". It had increased by 36% in 2024 to almost US$670 million, but Australia ranked ninth among sources of foreign direct investment and accounted for around 1% of Indonesia's inbound FDI. A 2023 report for the Australian government described unclear and changing laws and regulations as a significant source of disruption for foreign investors across Southeast Asia, including Indonesia. The Indonesia prospectus also described reforms that expanded the Online Single Submission platform, imposed time limits for approvals, digitised land acquisition and environmental permitting, and sought more consistent enforcement and fewer conflicting by-laws.

=== IA-CEPA and regional trade frameworks ===
The Indonesia-Australia Comprehensive Economic Partnership Agreement (IA-CEPA) took effect on 5 July 2020. At entry into force, Australia set duties on all Indonesian goods at zero, while Indonesia eliminated 10,229 tariff lines, equivalent to 94.5% of its total. At Indonesia's request, Australia applied to Indonesian electric vehicles rules of origin that Australia's Department of Foreign Affairs and Trade (DFAT) described as more liberal than those in any of its other trade agreements.

The services and labour-mobility arrangements accompanying IA-CEPA included memoranda on a reciprocal skills exchange and a workplace-based training visa arrangement. Four associated side letters concerned work-and-holiday visas, recognition of professional engineers, technical and vocational education, and health-professional standards and services. DFAT stated that the agreement gave Australian companies greater certainty in Indonesian education, tourism, communications, health, aged-care and mining services. Its goods provisions established a bilateral mechanism for dealing with non-tariff measures. On 25 August 2023, the governments amended the Skills Development Exchange memorandum to encourage employee exchanges between Indonesian and Australian companies accompanied by workplace knowledge transfer.

Two-way trade increased from A$12.91 billion when IA-CEPA entered into force to A$35.38 billion in 2024. At the agreement's fifth-anniversary commemoration in July 2025, Indonesian trade minister Budi Santoso said that IA-CEPA had established a form of cooperation extending beyond tariff liberalisation and had positively affected trade in goods and services and bilateral investment. The leaders agreed in May 2025 to begin a general review of IA-CEPA. Santoso said that the review was intended to keep the agreement relevant, preserve its added value and increase its benefits for both countries. Coordinating economic minister Airlangga Hartarto said that Indonesia planned to include new subjects in the review, including cooperation on critical minerals. Indonesian ambassador Siswo Pramono called for stronger economic resilience and said that IA-CEPA should serve Indonesia's interests as a developing country.

A 2026 policy brief issued through Indonesia's coordinating economic ministry identified strict product standards and limited Indonesian production capacity as continuing constraints on the competitiveness of Indonesian exports in Australia. The brief called for greater trade facilitation and stronger business capacity to meet Australian standards, together with a more directed investment strategy moving beyond the mining sector towards higher-value and sustainable activities.

On 13 July 2026, the governments launched Katalis 2.0, an Australian-funded programme implemented in partnership with Indonesia to support IA-CEPA through practical work involving government, industry and other economic institutions. Deputy trade minister Dyah Roro Esti Widya Putri said that Indonesia sought to use the programme to widen trade and investment opportunities, increase the competitiveness of national industries and create more opportunities for Indonesian businesses in international markets.

The ASEAN-Australia-New Zealand Free Trade Area took effect for Indonesia on 10 January 2012. At that point, tariff-free treatment applied to 80% of Australia's then-current exports to Indonesia and 78% of Indonesia's tariff lines. Indonesia signed the second protocol amending AANZFTA on 21 August 2023, adding chapters on small and medium-sized enterprises, sustainable trade and development, and government procurement. The trade ministry said that the additions would modernise trading practices, ease flows of goods and services to ASEAN, Australia and New Zealand, and improve access for Indonesian service businesses and investors.

The Regional Comprehensive Economic Partnership took effect for Australia on 1 January 2022 and for Indonesia on 2 January 2023. Indonesia's trade ministry calls RCEP the broadest services agreement the country has joined and points to provisions for reducing trade barriers and discrimination and for moving from positive-list to negative-list commitments.

=== Agriculture and live animal exports ===
In 2024–25, Indonesia ranked first among Australia's overseas markets for both wheat and live cattle. IA-CEPA provided duty-free access for 575,000 Australian live male cattle in its first year, with the quota increasing by 4% annually to 700,000 cattle in the sixth year. In February 2025, 200 breeding cows and 3,000 feeder cattle arrived in Indonesia from Australia, and Indonesia's agriculture ministry said the shipment was intended to strengthen the national beef-cattle population and reduce reliance on imported beef.

Australia suspended live-cattle exports to Indonesia in June 2011 after an Australian television programme showed the mistreatment of Australian cattle in Indonesian abattoirs. Indonesia's agriculture minister criticised Australia for imposing the suspension without first consulting Indonesia, while saying that the interruption could assist domestic cattle producers by reducing reliance on imports and improving local prices. The first consignment under the Exporter Supply Chain Assurance System (ESCAS) was exported to Indonesia in August 2011. ESCAS requires exporters to keep their exported feeder and slaughter livestock within approved supply chains up to and including slaughter, trace the location of every animal throughout the supply chain, meet animal-welfare standards, and have the supply chains independently audited.

== Development and humanitarian cooperation ==
=== Australian development assistance ===
The Australia–Indonesia Development Partnership Plan 2024–2028 sets three objectives, namely equitable and sustainable economic transformation, climate-resilient communities and strong institutions. Senior Indonesian government representatives took part in consultations on the plan, and at the July 2024 Development Senior Officials' Meeting its proposed objectives were considered alongside Indonesia's development plans and priorities and were agreed to be closely linked to the RPJPN. Indonesian officials also favoured retaining a flexible and responsive programme, valued Australian advice and grant funding, and sought access to blended finance for development needs, including energy transition.

In November 2024, Indonesia's Bappenas minister Rachmat Pambudy listed economic governance, basic services, the energy transition, health and social inclusion among areas in which Indonesia valued Australian support. Pambudy presented the National Long-Term Development Plan 2025–2045 as Indonesia's long-term plan for Indonesia Emas 2045 and said that international partners, including Australia, had an important role in achieving its goals. For 2026–27, Australia's budget estimate for official development assistance to Indonesia is A$346.8 million, including a bilateral allocation of A$308.6 million.

The partnership has shifted from infrastructure-building and service-focused programmes towards technical assistance and selected grants, recognising Indonesia's leadership, policy ambitions and capacity. Programmes are jointly designed with the Indonesian government, and decision-making bodies jointly chaired by representatives of both governments decide workplans and evaluate progress.

=== Disaster relief and emergency assistance ===
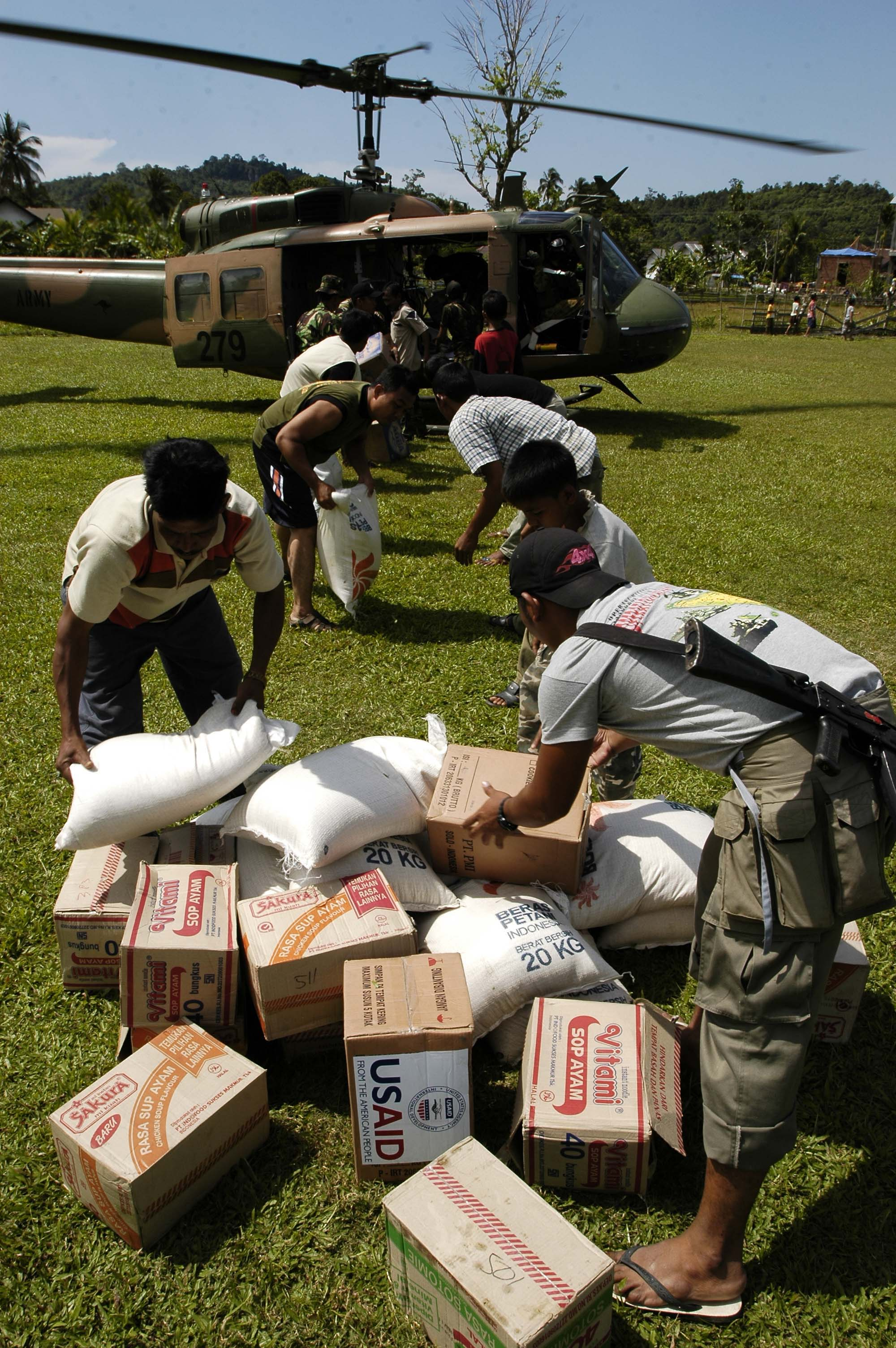
Indonesians unload relief supplies from an Australian Army UH-1 Iroquois helicopter at Lamno, Aceh, during Operation Sumatra Assist in January 2005.

Following the 2004 Indian Ocean earthquake and tsunami, Australia sent medical teams and humanitarian supplies to Indonesia aboard four Royal Australian Air Force C-130 aircraft within 36 hours.The governments created the Australia–Indonesia Partnership for Reconstruction and Development with A$1 billion to be provided over five years, divided equally between grants and highly concessional finance; the first Joint Commission then set implementation principles and funding priorities.

Around A$323 million was spent on recovery and reconstruction in Aceh and Nias between 2004 and 2011, while the wider package allocated about A$328 million to roads in eastern Indonesia and A$300 million to basic education. Australian assistance was used to rebuild schools, health facilities and village halls, restore livelihoods and provide training in public-service administration in Aceh.

After the Black Saturday bushfires in Victoria in February 2009, Indonesia pledged $1 million towards rebuilding schools and sent a police forensic team to assist with identifying victims. Presidential spokesman Dino Patti Djalal said that the assistance reflected Indonesia's solidarity with Australia and the disaster-management partnership that had developed after the 2004 tsunami.

A 38-member Indonesian National Armed Forces humanitarian contingent arrived in New South Wales in February 2020 to assist Australia during the 2019–20 Australian bushfire season. The contingent comprised 26 army engineers, six marines, four air-force construction personnel and two military medical personnel, and was assigned to support operations in the Blue Mountains, including response work and the clearance of fire-damaged land. Defence Minister Linda Reynolds said that Indonesia brought disaster-relief and recovery experience that complemented the capabilities of the Australian Defence Force.

In October 2024, the governments extended their disaster-management memorandum of understanding for 2024–26 under the SIAP SIAGA programme. SIAP SIAGA works with Indonesian ministries, provincial and local governments and civil society to improve disaster prevention, preparedness, response and recovery, in line with Indonesia's 2025–29 medium-term development plan.

=== Governance, infrastructure, and electoral cooperation ===
The Australia–Indonesia Partnership for Economic Development (Prospera) works with around 30 Indonesian institutions and brings Indonesian and international specialists into work on Indonesia's economic-policy priorities. The Indonesia–Australia Partnership for Infrastructure (KIAT) assists with infrastructure policy and regulation, project preparation, finance and implementation. At a March 2025 steering-committee meeting, Indonesian officials proposed aligning SKALA (Synergies and Collaboration for Accelerating Basic Service Delivery) priorities with national policy and increasing Indonesian involvement in recruiting experts and evaluating programme activities.

For the 1999 Indonesian elections, the Australian Electoral Commission (AEC) assisted Indonesia with polling stations, ballot production and results compilation, while also supporting domestic election-monitoring groups. In May 2026, the General Elections Commission (KPU) said it was focusing on voter education and countering misinformation and disinformation ahead of the 2029 election. The KPU welcomed further cooperation with the Australian Electoral Commission on institutional capacity, knowledge exchange, technical training and professional development.

== Migration, education, and people-to-people links ==
=== Indonesian migration to Australia ===
The number of permanent settlers arriving in Australia from Indonesia since 1991 (monthly)

The Colombo Plan, which began in 1951, brought Indonesian students to Australia for study, and many obtained temporary residency. In July 1961, Indonesian embassy counsellor Bahroem Sjah told Australian officials that Colombo Plan students who wished to remain after marrying Australians were "badly needed in Indonesia" and asked that Australian authorities insist on their return.

From 1901 to 1973, the White Australia policy restricted Indonesian migration, and immigration from Indonesia increased after the policy ended. In Victoria, the Indonesia-born community grew fourfold between 1986 and 1996 to 12,128. Arrivals included temporary students and migrants entering through family-reunion and skilled-migration programmes. At the end of June 2024, 120,160 Indonesian-born people lived in Australia, 59.4% more than in June 2014, making them the country's 14th-largest migrant community.

=== Student mobility and higher education ===
Australian residents travelling to Indonesia for less than one year, since 1991 (monthly)

During 2025, 25,409 Indonesian student-visa holders began or continued courses in Australia.The number of Indonesians who have studied in Australia exceeds 200,000, and Australia Awards Indonesia makes about 220 scholarship and short-course awards annually.Indonesia has attracted more New Colombo Plan participants than any other destination. Since 2014, Australian undergraduates have received 158 scholarships and 14,133 semester or mobility grants for study and internships there. Since 2014, more than 2,600 Australian undergraduates have participated in programmes run by the Australian Consortium for 'In-Country' Indonesian Studies in Indonesia with New Colombo Plan Mobility funding.

By November 2025, Indonesia hosted three Australian university campuses, Monash University in Jakarta, Western Sydney University in Surabaya, and a Deakin-Lancaster campus in Bandung.

=== Indonesian-language education in Australia ===
Year 12 enrolments in Indonesian have fallen from more than 1,100 in 2010 to 542 in 2023. The number of tertiary Indonesian programmes has also declined, from 22 in 1992 to 10 in 2025. At a March 2024 meeting in Melbourne, Badan Bahasa said it would support teachers in producing materials suited to local contexts, and Indonesian ambassador Siswo Pramono said he would continue discussions with the Australian government over the availability of Indonesian-language teachers. Indonesian university students in Canberra have also been involved in teaching Indonesian in schools.

Under the 2025–29 bilateral Plan of Action, the Indonesian Language for Foreign Speaker (BIPA) program is to continue in Australia, Indonesian-language teaching in Australian schools is to be strengthened, and the governments are to explore adding more Indonesian-language teachers. In January 2026, the Indonesian consul-general in Melbourne met the Victorian Indonesian Language Teachers' Association (VILTA) to discuss joint promotion of Indonesian language and culture in schools across Victoria.

=== Youth, alumni, and exchange programmes ===
Established in 1982 with Indonesia's Ministry of Youth and Sport, the Australia-Indonesia Youth Exchange Program offers 21–25-year-olds cultural, workplace and social experience across the two countries. Participants undertake workplace experience, language study, academic sessions and cultural activities. In 2026, each country supplied 21 delegates. Indonesia's Ministry of Youth and Sport lists the exchange among its international youth programmes, which seek to expand participants' outlook, develop interpersonal and leadership skills and improve their ability to compete internationally.

Australia Awards Indonesia counts more than 13,000 alumni.The Plan of Action promotes two-way study through Australian schemes such as the New Colombo Plan and Australia Awards, and Indonesian schemes including the Arts and Culture and Darmasiswa scholarships.Since 2008, BRIDGE has formed 253 school partnerships and trained 953 teachers in Australia and Indonesia. Participation extends across subject areas and is not confined to Indonesian-language teaching.

== Tourism, transport, and aviation ==
=== Tourism and transport links ===
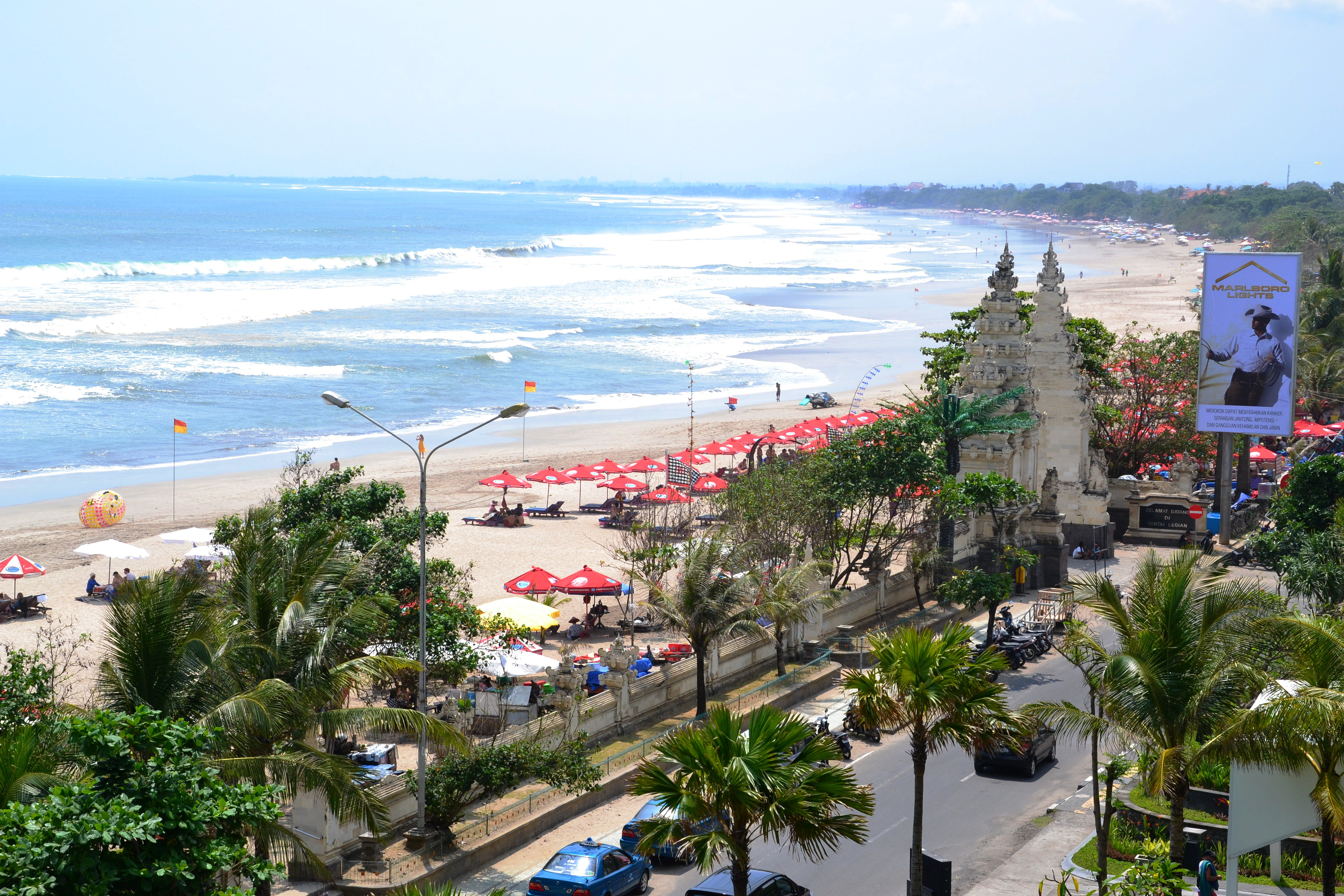
Kuta Beach in Bali. Australia has long been one of Bali's principal tourism markets and was its largest source of international visitors in 2025.

In 2024-25, Indonesia was the leading overseas destination for Australian residents, accounting for 1.7 million short-term returns and 14.2% of their overseas trips. Holidays were the stated purpose of 87.2% of these journeys. Bali recorded 6.9 million direct international visitor arrivals in 2025, and visitors from Australia made up 23.44%, the largest share from any country. In the year ending December 2025, Australia recorded 242,074 arrivals from Indonesia, 8% more than in 2024 and its highest annual total. Indonesia was ranked tenth among its visitor markets by arrivals. Indonesian visitors spent A$1.2 billion in Australia in the year ending September 2025, while Indonesian holidaymakers generated 1.1 million visitor nights in regional areas.

The Northern Summer 2026 timetable listed services linking Jakarta with Perth, Melbourne and Sydney, and Denpasar with Adelaide, Brisbane, Cairns, Darwin, Gold Coast, Melbourne, Perth and Sydney. When Indonesia AirAsia opened its Adelaide-Denpasar service in June 2025, the tourism ministry said that it would improve Australian access to Bali and other Indonesian destinations. The airline later operated four routes between Australia and Bali. The ministry also said that the airline's international and domestic connections could bring Australian visitors to Bali, Lombok, Yogyakarta and other destinations, and that increasing flight numbers and opening routes were important to meeting Indonesia's tourism targets.

The 2025-29 bilateral Plan of Action provides for coordination among tourism agencies and businesses, broader links among tourism operators, and cooperation on sustainable and community-based tourism. It also proposes an update of the bilateral air-services agreement to support further growth in air services, connectivity, tourism and trade.

=== Aviation regulation and safety ===
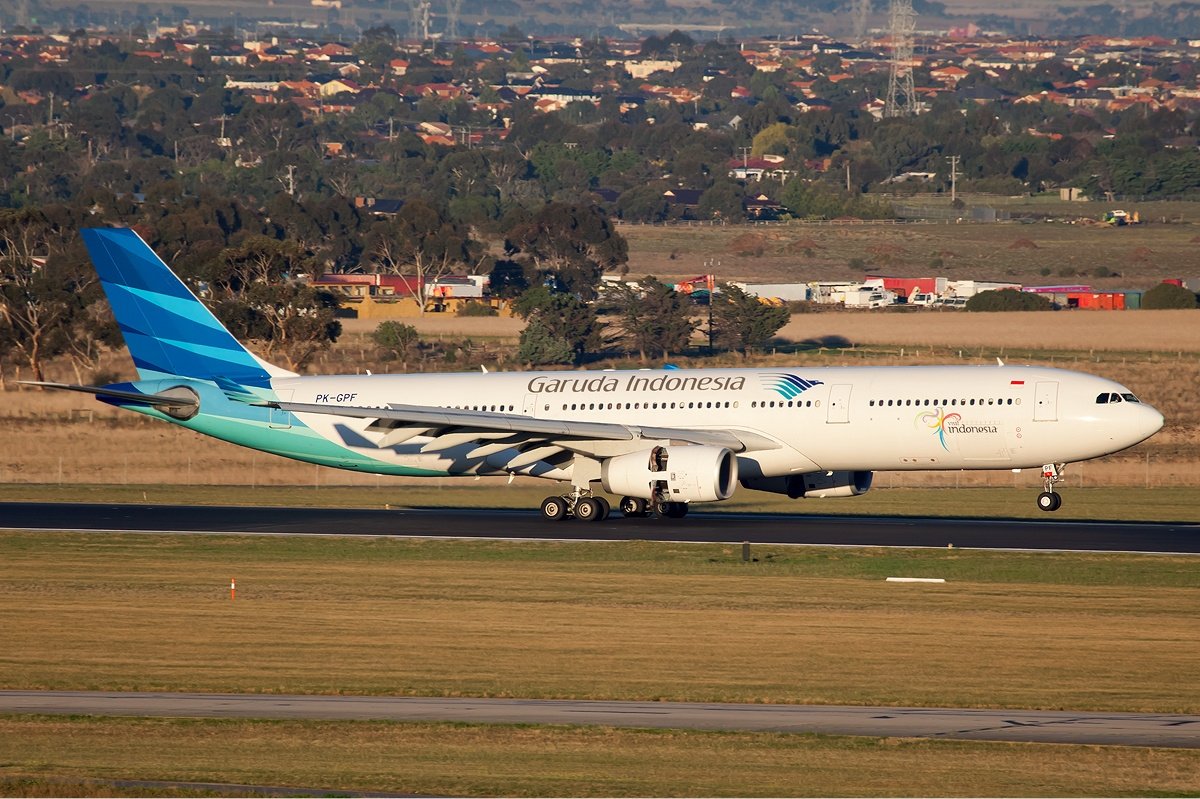
A Garuda Indonesia Airbus A330-300 landing at Melbourne Airport.

The air-services agreement dated 7 February 2013 is in force and is supplemented by a 2011 memorandum of understanding. Indonesia ratified it through Presidential Regulation No. 77 of 2016, which took effect on 10 August 2016.

On 7 March 2007, a Garuda Indonesia Boeing 737 overran the runway at Yogyakarta. Twenty passengers and one flight attendant died, including five Australians. The accident prompted the Australian government to establish the Indonesia Transport Safety Assistance Package (ITSAP), under which the governments developed measures addressing transport-safety priorities identified by Indonesia. In June 2007, the European Union decided to bar all 51 Indonesian airlines from flying to the bloc because of safety concerns, a decision Indonesia called "unilateral." In contrast, Australia did not impose a corresponding ban on Garuda Indonesia, and Prime Minister John Howard said that he had received no advice that the airline was unsafe.

At a June 2023 ITSAP seminar, Indonesia's civil-aviation directorate and Australia's Civil Aviation Safety Authority discussed runway safety and reductions in accidents involving controlled flight into terrain and loss of control in flight. The agencies had also held a workshop in January 2023 on wildlife hazards, particularly bird strikes near airports. AirNav Indonesia and Airservices Australia coordinated through ITSAP on air-navigation operations, with the work intended to improve safety and efficiency in the airspace of both countries.

At the May 2026 Indonesia-Australia Transport Safety Forum, officials evaluated bilateral cooperation and prepared a 2026-27 action plan. Discussions included transport-incident investigations, safety regulation and institutional and workforce capacity. The 2025-29 Plan of Action further provides for education, training and personnel exchanges and for consultation through the Indonesia-Australia Transportation Safety Forum and Transport Security Forum.

== Public opinion and cultural relations ==
=== Public opinion ===
In a 2016 survey, 87% of Indonesian respondents expressed a favourable view of Australia, while 43% of Australian respondents expressed a favourable view of Indonesia. In the Lowy Institute's 2021 Indonesia Poll, 55% trusted Australia to act responsibly in the world, and Australia received an average rating of 58 on the poll's 0-100 feelings scale. The 2026 Lowy Institute Poll recorded an average Australian rating of 55 for Indonesia on the same 0-100 scale.

=== Societal engagement ===
In the 2016 Lowy Institute Poll, 91% of Australians regarded the relationship with Indonesia as important. The report contrasted this finding with limited public familiarity, 33% of Australians regarded Indonesia as a democracy in 2013 and 34% did so in 2015, while 47% could not answer whether they admired President Joko Widodo in 2015. A bilateral survey released in the same year found that 19% of Australian respondents rated their knowledge of Indonesia as good, compared with 43% of Indonesian respondents who gave that rating to their knowledge of Australia.

The Australia-Indonesia Centre's 2016 perceptions study stated that international relations were not foremost in most people's thinking and recommended engaging citizens through subjects that interested them or offered a clear personal benefit. It also called for greater understanding and empathy between the two societies.

=== Media and public perceptions ===
Indonesian ambassador Hamzah Thayeb said in 2007 that sections of each society misunderstood the other country. A 2006 Lowy Institute poll reported that most Australian respondents regarded Indonesia as a security threat, and Indonesian respondents believed that Australia interfered in Indonesian affairs and wanted Papua separated from Indonesia. In the 2021 Lowy Institute Indonesia Poll, average agreement that Australia sought to separate western New Guinea from Indonesia fell from 6.8 in 2006 to 6.0, while agreement that Australia interfered too much in Indonesian affairs was 6.0, below 6.7 in 2006 but above 5.5 in 2011. In the same poll, 34% of Indonesians regarded Australia as a threat.

Across Australian polls dating from the 1940s, positive views of Indonesian people and culture appeared alongside apprehension that Indonesia could pose a military threat. In 2017, Indonesian ambassador Yohanes Kristiarto Soeryo Legowo said that inaccurate perceptions remained in both countries. UGM international-relations academic Ririn Tri Nurhayati attributed much of the unfavourable Australian view of Indonesian democracy to Australian media giving preference to negative political reporting.

A 2015 study comparing four Indonesian and Australian online news portals identified different narratives of the 2013 spying dispute and linked the contrast to the two countries' press systems and communication cultures, as well as the ideologies of the outlets. The authors of a 2016 framing analysis concluded that Media Indonesia's online coverage of the Bali Nine dispute selected issues favourable to the Indonesian government and presented Australian prime minister Tony Abbott negatively.

The 2025-29 bilateral Plan of Action calls for more exchanges involving media organisations and individuals, the development of joint programmes and cooperation on digital diplomacy. The Elizabeth O'Neill Journalism Award selects one journalist from each country each year for a fully funded programme of up to two weeks in the other country. Its stated purpose is to give journalists a stronger understanding of contemporary issues in the neighbouring country. In May 2026, the Australia-Indonesia Senior Editors Program brought five Indonesian editors to Perth and Melbourne for a one-week visit that concluded with a dialogue involving Australian editors. Participating editor Kartika Sari wrote that the programme was arranged to improve understanding and contact between the two societies.

=== Cultural institutions and exchanges ===
Australia and Indonesia signed a cultural agreement in Jakarta on 14 June 1968 to encourage further exchanges and greater understanding of each other's history and culture. During a visit to Indonesia in February 1973, Prime Minister Gough Whitlam announced that Australia would contribute A$200,000 over five years to the UNESCO fund for the restoration of Borobudur.

The Australian government created the Australia-Indonesia Institute in 1989, and its programmes cover education and research, business, media, religion, the arts, youth, sport and community development. The bilateral Plan of Action provides for exchanges and joint activity in broadcasting, visual arts, creative industries and cultural heritage, as well as contact among religious communities.

Begun in 2002, the Australia-Indonesia Muslim Exchange Program connects Muslim community activists and emerging leaders from the two countries and has more than 300 alumni. The Indonesian consulate-general in Melbourne offers Sapa Budaya Indonesia to schools in Victoria and Tasmania, including introductory Indonesian-language activities and gamelan workshops.

=== Sport ===
Indonesia's Ministry of Youth and Sport records a bilateral memorandum on sporting cooperation dated 29 June 1995 and classifies it as expired. The 2025-29 bilateral Plan of Action provides for stronger sporting ties and closer partnerships between the countries' national sporting organisations. During talks with an Australian embassy delegation in September 2024, Indonesian youth and sport minister Dito Ariotedjo said that Indonesia used sport in diplomacy between countries and that sport diplomacy would be a focus of the incoming government. At the same meeting, Australia-Indonesia Institute chair Greg Fealy said that pencak silat was popular in Australia and practised by many Australians.

Football teams representing Australia and Indonesia first played each other in 1928, and Australia hosted Indonesia in Sydney for a FIFA World Cup qualifier on 20 March 2025. At the May 2025 Annual Leaders' Meeting, the governments welcomed closer cooperation between Football Australia and the Football Association of Indonesia (PSSI), with major events and mentoring in women's football identified as possible areas of work. After a palace lunch on 15 May, President Prabowo Subianto gave Prime Minister Anthony Albanese an Indonesian national-team shirt numbered 31, while Albanese gave Prabowo an Australian shirt numbered 08. The numbers referred to Albanese's position as Australia's 31st prime minister and Prabowo's as Indonesia's 8th president.

In June 2026, Indonesia's men's and women's national field-hockey teams played the NT Stingers during the Festival of Hockey in Darwin under cooperation between the Indonesian Hockey Federation and Hockey NT. Six Indonesian athletes had also joined an exchange programme in Darwin beginning on 12 June. On 8 April 2026, Bali Geckos coaches conducted Australian rules football training for 30 pupils at SMA Muhammadiyah 1 Denpasar, a school participating in the bilateral BRIDGE programme.

== Continuing sources of tension ==
=== West Papua ===
In February 2024, Deputy Prime Minister Richard Marles said that Australia supported Indonesian sovereignty over Papua and gave no support to separatist movements against Indonesia. During a visa dispute in 2006, President Susilo Bambang Yudhoyono described Papua as an Indonesian domestic matter, opposed outside intervention and said that its problems should be resolved peacefully, fairly and with dignity. At Indonesia's 2022 Universal Periodic Review, a mechanism of the United Nations Human Rights Council, Australia recommended completion of investigations into human-rights violations, including in Papua, and access for credible independent observers.

On 18 January 2006, 43 people from West Papua reached Cape York. On 23 March, Australia granted three-year protection visas to 42 of them. Indonesia temporarily recalled its ambassador in protest. Its Foreign Ministry said that the Indonesian embassy had not been consulted, that the decision had disturbed the general atmosphere of the relationship and that it would not encourage cooperation against irregular migration.

Yudhoyono had asked Prime Minister John Howard to return all the 43 people and guaranteed that they would not be prosecuted if they returned to Indonesia. Australia said that the visa decision did not question Indonesian sovereignty over West Papua and that the Howard government was bound by Australian law. The 2018 Comprehensive Strategic Partnership committed each government not to support activities that threatened the other's stability, sovereignty or territorial integrity.

=== Capital punishment and criminal cases ===
Australian policy rejects capital punishment in every case and supports its worldwide abolition. Indonesia retained the death penalty in domestic law, and in January 2015 President Joko Widodo said that courts imposed death sentences and that he would not grant clemency in narcotics cases.

Indonesia executed Australian citizens Andrew Chan and Myuran Sukumaran on 29 April 2015. Australia announced that its ambassador would be withdrawn for consultations and kept ministerial visits suspended, while acknowledging that the men had committed a serious crime and that Indonesia was acting within its sovereignty.

In December 2024, Indonesia transferred the five remaining members of the Bali Nine to Australia after they had served more than 19 years in Indonesian prisons. Indonesia said that the arrangement did not pardon the men and that they retained prisoner status after their transfer. The Australian statement described their offences as serious and affirmed respect for Indonesian sovereignty and legal processes.

=== Refugees, asylum seekers, and border policy ===
On 26 August 2001, the Norwegian freighter MV Tampa took 433 Afghan asylum seekers from an Indonesian fishing boat in distress 140 kilometres north of Christmas Island, within Indonesia's search-and-rescue zone. The master initially set course for Indonesia, but changed course for Christmas Island after some of those rescued objected to returning. Australian authorities then directed the ship to remain outside territorial waters and take them back to Indonesia. On 1 September, Australia announced that New Zealand would receive 150 of the group and Nauru the remainder for processing outside Australian territory, an arrangement Prime Minister John Howard called a "Pacific solution".

Established in 2002 and co-chaired by Australia and Indonesia, the Bali Process is a non-binding multilateral forum concerned with people smuggling, trafficking in persons and related transnational crime. At its sixth ministerial conference in 2016, Indonesian foreign minister Retno Marsudi proposed a mechanism for sudden emergencies, closer coordination among law-enforcement bodies, faster processing of asylum seekers and refugees, and practical burden-sharing among countries of origin, transit and destination.

Australia's Operation Sovereign Borders began on 18 September 2013, and its policy included turning back asylum-seeker boats when commanders considered this safe as a means of deterring maritime people smuggling. Indonesian foreign minister Marty Natalegawa opposed the turn-back policy, arguing that it would not provide a comprehensive solution to people smuggling. Between 1 December 2013 and 20 January 2014, two Australian naval frigates entered Indonesian waters four times and customs vessels did so twice during border operations. The joint Australian review concluded that the incursions were inadvertent and resulted from incorrect calculations of the maritime boundary, and the government made formal apologies to Indonesia.

Indonesia's coordinating ministry for political, legal and security affairs described territorial breaches as a grave threat to bilateral relations, demanded an official explanation and a guarantee against repetition, and later called for the operation that had caused the breaches to end. Australia defended turn-backs as a deterrent to people smuggling and said that they were to occur only when the commanding officer considered them safe.

At bilateral meetings in January 2026, the governments agreed to deepen cooperation on law, immigration and security. One meeting described a joint response to people smuggling that balanced security and humanitarian concerns, while another covered illegal migration and stronger cooperation against people smuggling.

== See also ==
- Australian Aid
- Australia–Indonesia border
- Australia–Indonesia prisoner exchange agreement negotiations
- Bali Nine
- Foreign relations of Australia
- Foreign relations of Indonesia
- Indonesian Australians
- List of ambassadors of Australia to Indonesia
- List of ambassadors of Indonesia to Australia
- Merauke Five
- Australia–Netherlands relations
- Indonesia–Netherlands relations
