= Siswo Pramono =

Indonesian diplomat

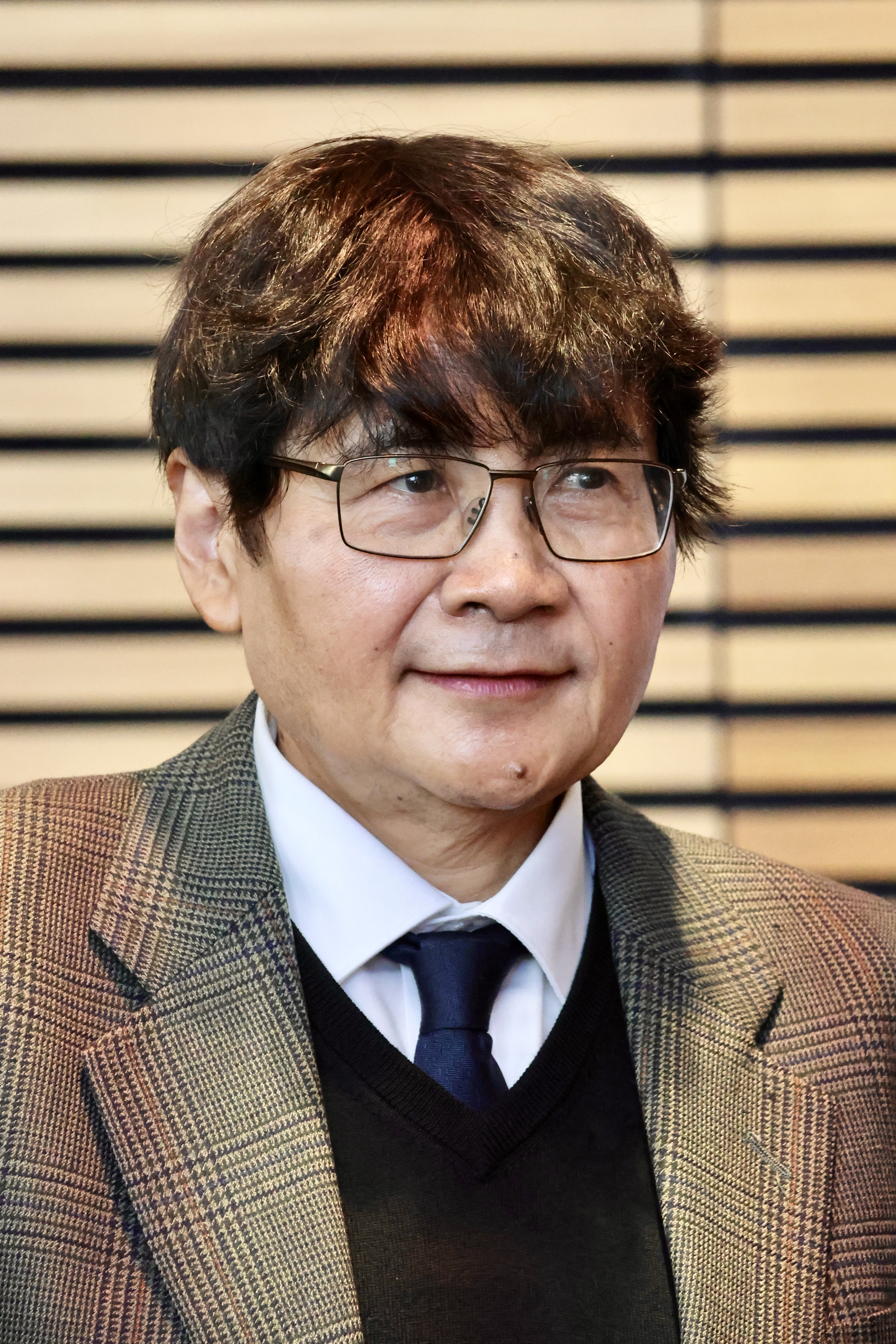
- Pramono in 2025

24th Ambassador of Indonesia to Australia
- Incumbent
- Assumed office 25 October 2021
- President: Joko Widodo
- Preceded by: Kristiarto Legowo

Personal details
- Spouse: Dr Marsia Gustiananda
- Education: Airlangga University; Monash University; Australian National University
- Profession: Diplomat
- Siswo Pramono's voice Pramono speaking about ASEAN; Recorded 26 August 2025

Siswo Pramono is an Indonesian diplomat who is currently the ambassador for the Republic of Indonesia to Australia, posted in Canberra. During his posting, he is also serving as Indonesian Ambassador to the Republic of Vanuatu.

== Education ==
Pramono grew up in Tulungagung in Tulungagung Regency, East Java, a town around 120 km to the southwest of Surabaya, the capital of East Java. He later studied law at Airlangga University in Surabaya, the main state-run university in East Java, with a scholarship from the Indonesian Ministry of Foreign Affairs before moving to Jakarta to take up an appointment in the ministry.

Pramono undertook graduate study in Australia in the late 1990s and in the early 2000s. He holds a Master of Law degree from Monash University in Melbourne and a PhD degree in political science from the Australian National University (ANU) (2003) where he studied in the Research School of Social Sciences. His PhD thesis at the ANU was on the topic of "The International Politics of Genocide".

== Career ==
Pramono has served in the diplomatic service for the Republic of Indonesia in various capacities. He has held positions as:

- Head/Director-General of the Policy Analysis and Development Agency, Ministry of Foreign Affairs of Indonesia.
- Deputy Chief of Mission, Indonesian Embassy in Berlin, Germany.
- Head/Director of the Center for Policy Analysis and Development on Asia-Pacific and Africa Regions, Policy Analysis and Development Agency, Ministry of Foreign Affairs of Indonesia.
- Advisor to the Permanent Representation of the Republic of Indonesia to the Organisation for the Prohibition of Chemical Weapons in The Hague.

Before his appointment as the ambassador designate to Australia, he was the Head/Director-General of the Policy Analysis and Development Agency (PADA) in the Ministry of Foreign Affairs in Jakarta.

In his position as Head of the Policy Analysis and Development Agency in the Ministry of Foreign Affairs, Pramono provided commentary about various aspects of Indonesian foreign policy. He has written, for example, about China's Nine-dash line (2016), the future of the Melanesian Spearhead Group (2016), and President Joko Widodo's foreign policy (2019), as well as the ASEAN Outlook on the Indo-Pacific (2021)

Pramono presented his credentials to the Governor-General of Australia David Hurley in Canberra on 8 December 2021.
