= List of ambassadors of Australia to Croatia =

Ambassador of Australia to Croatia

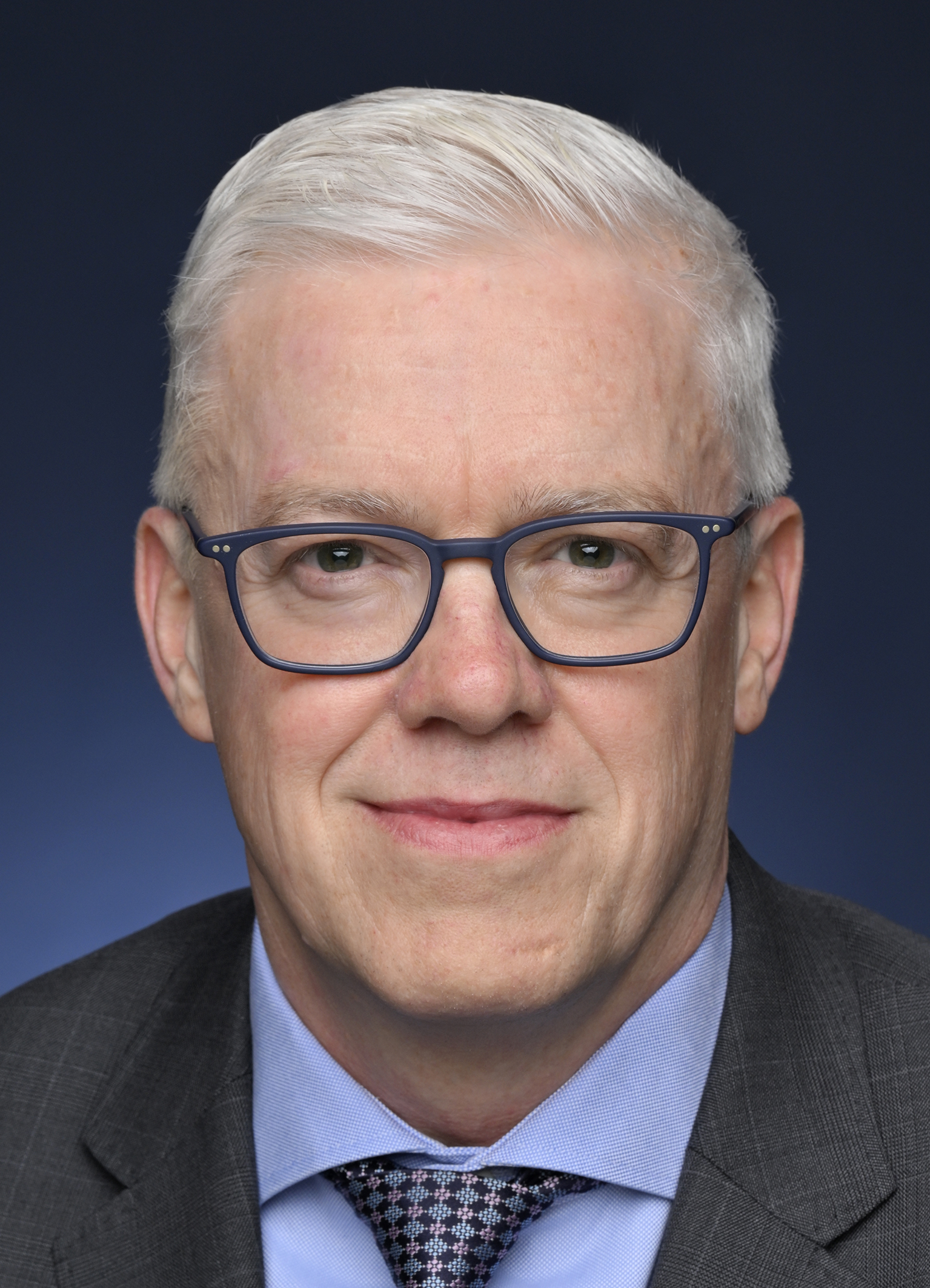
- Incumbent; Richard Rodgers since February 2023
- Department of Foreign Affairs and Trade
- Style: His Excellency
- Reports to: Minister for Foreign Affairs
- Residence: Zagreb, Croatia
- Nominator: Prime Minister of Australia
- Appointer: Governor General of Australia
- Inaugural holder: Michael Wilson
- Formation: 13 February 1992
- Website: Australian Embassy in Zagreb

The ambassador of Australia to Croatia is an officer of the Australian Department of Foreign Affairs and Trade and the head of the Embassy of the Commonwealth of Australia to the Republic of Croatia in Zagreb. The position has the rank and status of an ambassador extraordinary and plenipotentiary and is held by Richard Rodgers, since February 2023.

Croatia and Australia have enjoyed official diplomatic relations since 1967, when Australia opened an Embassy to the Socialist Federal Republic of Yugoslavia (which included the Socialist Republic of Croatia) in Belgrade. However, with the breakup of Yugoslavia in the early 1990s, Prime Minister Bob Hawke acted quickly to recognise the newly independent former Yugoslav Republics of Slovenia and Croatia. Australia became one of the first countries to recognise Croatia's independence, on 16 January 1992, and diplomatic relations were established on 13 February 1992, with the Australian Ambassador in Vienna receiving non-resident accreditation as the first Australian Ambassador to Croatia. The first Ambassador, Michael Wilson, presented his credentials to President Franjo Tudjman in March 1992. A resident embassy was not established until October 1999, when the Australian Government appointed Neil Francis as the first Ambassador resident in Zagreb.

The Ambassador of Australia to Croatia currently holds non-residency accreditation as the Ambassador of Australia to Kosovo.

== List of ambassadors ==
Ordinal	Name	Other offices	Residency	Term start date	Term end date	Time in office	Notes
1	Michael Wilson		Vienna, Austria	13 February 1992	1993	0–1 years	
2	Ronald Walker		Vienna, Austria	1993	1996	2–3 years	
3	Lance Joseph		Vienna, Austria	February 1997	October 1999	2 years, 8 months	
4	Neil Francis		Zagreb, Croatia	October 1999	November 2003	4 years, 1 month	
5	Anna George		Zagreb, Croatia	November 2003	September 2006	2 years, 10 months	
6	Tracy Reid	^{A}	Zagreb, Croatia	September 2006	December 2009	3 years, 3 months	
7	Beverly Mercer	^{A}	Zagreb, Croatia	December 2009	December 2012	3 years	
8	Susan Cox OAM	^{A}	Zagreb, Croatia	December 2012	2017	4–5 years	
9	Elizabeth Petrović	^{A}	Zagreb, Croatia	January 2017	August 2020	9 years, 9 months	
10	Richard Rodgers			February 2023	Incumbent		[13]

=== Notes ===
^A Also non-resident Australian Ambassador to the Republic of Kosovo, 21 May 2008-present.

== See also ==
- Australia-Croatia relations
- Australia–Yugoslavia relations
- Foreign relations of Australia
