= 2003 Special Honours (Australia) =

Awards list for Australia

The Special Honours Lists for Australia are announced by the Sovereign and Governor-General at any time. In 2003, a list of people received recognition for their parts in the response to the 2002 Bali Bombings.

== Bravery decorations ==
=== Cross of Valour ===
The Cross of Valour is awarded for acts of the most conspicuous courage in circumstances of extreme peril.

- Senior Constable Timothy Ian BRITTEN, WA
- Richard John JOYES, Scarborough WA

=== Star of Courage ===
The Star of Courage is awarded for acts of conspicuous courage in circumstances of great peril.

- Ben Michael CLOHESSY, Madeley WA
- Natalie Joy GOOLD, Croydon South VIC
- Robert Alan MEREDITH, Engadine NSW
- Lauren John MUNRO, Forbes NSW

=== Bravery Medal ===
The Bravery Medal is awarded for acts of bravery in hazardous circumstances.

- Luke Brewster GORDON, Woronora Heights NSW
- Randal Peter GRAYSON, Forbes NSW
- Jake Michael GRONEBERG, Mullumbimby NSW
- Peter Malcom HUGHES, Como WA
- Lynley Jane HUGUENIN, Wantirna VIC
- Michael Peter KENNEDY, Forrestfield WA
- Hans KRUSE, The Netherlands
- David Bruce McKAY, Yarrawarrah NSW
- Andrew James MILLER, Yarrawarrah NSW
- Andrew Scott MURRAY, Forbes NSW
- David Gary ROBERTS, Engadine NSW
- Brett Raymond RUSSELL, Grays Point NSW
- Daniel Paul TREACY, New Brighton NSW
- Anthony John WALLACE, Forbes NSW

=== Commendation for Brave Conduct ===
The Commendation for Brave Conduct is awarded for acts of bravery considered worthy of recognition.

- Christopher John BEIRNE, Mermaid Beach QLD
- Clinton Jayde ERNST, Canning Vale WA
- David Patrick HODDER, Forbes NSW
- Troy Andrew HOWE, Forbes NSW
- Hanabeth LUKE, Byron Bay NSW
- Ross William McGUIGAN, Terrigal NSW
- Shaun Robert McILROY, Port Fairy VIC
- Morgan Peter MacLACHLAN, Forrestfield WA
- Steven Edward MOYLAN, Carine WA
- Blake NEATE, Port Fairy VIC
- Simon Matthew QUAYLE, Kingsley WA
- Blair Aaron ROBERTSON, Port Fairy VIC
- Damien Lynden SHERIDAN, Forrestfield WA
- Daniel Keith SMITH, High Wycombe WA
- Jay Paul SOLOMON, Melbourne VIC*
- Chad Michael WOOD, High Wycombe WA
- Kalan ZOMER, Hocking WA

== Order of Australia ==
The Order of Australia is awarded to recognise achievement or meritorious service.

=== Officer (AO) in the General Division ===
Ross William TYSOE, O'Connor ACT
For service as Australian Consul-General in Bali at the time of the bombings on 12 October 2002 through leading the immediate consular response.

=== Member (AM) in the General Division ===
Graham Leonard ASHTON, AFP
For service as the leader of the Australian police component to the joint investigation and victim identification process, known as Operation Alliance, following the Bali bombings.
David Leslie CHAPLIN, Evatt ACT
For service as the Australian Vice-Consul in Bali at the time of the bombings through the provision of assistance to victims and to their families.
Professor Brendon John KEARNEY, Toorak Gardens SA
For service to medical administration in South Australia, particularly through the promotion of medical research, and as the co-ordinator for South Australia of the medical response team assisting victims of the Bali bombings.
Ian Ferguson KEMISH, Pearce ACT
For service in co-ordinating the crisis response for immediate evacuation of Australians from Bali and for assisting in victim identification procedures following the bombings.
Dr Gary David LUM, Tiwi NT
For service in jointly co-ordinating the medical assistance provided by the Royal Darwin Hospital to the victims of the Bali bombings.
John James McANULTY OAM, Garran ACT
For service as part of the Department of Foreign Affairs and Trade, Bali crisis taskforce in the provision of assistance to victims and to their families following the bombings.
Ben McDEVITT,
For service as the General Manager National Operations Australian Federal Police to Operation Alliance.
Timothy MORRIS, Canberra ACT
For service as Director, Counter Terrorism, Australian Federal Police to Operation Alliance, as the head of the bombing investigation and for the introduction of the Australian Federal Police Family Liaison Officers program.
Dr Leonard George NOTARAS, Tiwi NT
For service in jointly co-ordinating the medical assistance provided by the Royal Darwin Hospital to the victims of the Bali bombings.
Colin St John RIGBY, Curtin ACT
For service through the provision of immediate counselling services for victims, their families, and members of the Department of Foreign Affairs and Trade, Bali crisis taskforce, and through the development of an ongoing counselling strategy, following the Bali bombings.
Dr Priya THALAYASINGAM, Nedlands WA
For service through the provision of immediate emergency medical assistance to victims following the Bali bombings.
Dr Richard John TOMLINS, Bundaberg QLD
For service as Medical Counsellor to the Australian Embassy in Indonesia through providing medical assistance to victims following the Bali bombings.
Dr Vijith Sujeevan VIJAYASEKARAN, Nedlands WA
For service through the provision of immediate emergency medical assistance to victims following the Bali bombings.
Dr Fiona Melanie WOOD, West Perth WA
For service to medicine as a plastic and reconstructive surgeon, through research into the management of burns patients, and as co-ordinator of surgical staff at the Royal Perth Hospital during the treatment of people injured in the Bali bombings.

=== Medal (OAM) in the General Division ===
Rosslyn May ACOTT, Adelaide SA
For service through the provision of medical assistance to victims of the Bali bombings.
David Osborne BAKER, Nightcliff NT
For service through the provision of medical assistance to victims of the Bali bombings.
Duncan Bryce BAMFORD, Marden SA
For service through the provision of medical assistance to victims of the Bali bombings.
Alex Robert BARTLEM, Barton ACT
For service through the provision of assistance to victims and to their families following the Bali bombings.
Inspector John Alfred BIRD, TAS
For service as part of Operation Alliance.
Murray William BLACK, AFP
For service as part of Operation Alliance.
Kevin Bryon BLAKE, Katherine NT
For service through the provision of medical assistance to victims of the Bali bombings.
Julie Anne BROWNRIGG, Latham ACT
For service through the provision of medical assistance to victims of the Bali bombings.
Robert Allan CAMERON, Kambah ACT
For service through assisting the co-ordination of the medical evacuation of victims of the Bali bombings.
Stephen Andrew CANDOTTI, Narrabundah ACT
For service through the provision of assistance to families of victims of the Bali bombings.
Dr Bernard Ignatius CARNEY, Burnside SA
For service through the provision of medical assistance to victims of the Bali bombings.
Craig Ian CHITTICK, Downer ACT
For service through providing assistance and support to key Australian authorities and agencies in response to the Bali bombings.
Kendelle Meredith CLARK, AFP
For service as part of Operation Alliance.
Susan Louise COBLEY, Scullin ACT
For service through the provision of assistance to families of victims of the Bali bombings.
Andrew Alexander COLVIN, AFP
For service to Operation Alliance.
Kirk William CONINGHAM, Kingston ACT
For service as a member of the Department of Foreign Affairs and Trade, Bali crisis taskforce through liaison with the media following the bombings.
Susan COX, Pearce ACT
For service through the provision of assistance to victims and to their families following the Bali bombings.
Michael Joseph CROWLEY, Sanur Bali Indonesia
For service through the provision of assistance to victims and to their families following the Bali bombings.
Noreen Mary CUBIS, Wagga Wagga NSW
For service through the provision of medical assistance following the Bali bombings.
Christopher Paul DE CURE, Kambah ACT
For service through the provision of assistance to victims and to their families following the Bali bombings.
Brian Gerard DIAMOND, Denpasar Bali Indonesia
For service through the provision of assistance to families of victims of the Bali bombings.
Donald Keith ELLIOTT, Australian Embassy Jakarta
For service through facilitating liaison between Australian and Indonesian authorities following the Bali bombings, and through the provision of interpreting services for the Australian Federal Police at the site of the bombings.
Donald George EVANS, Isaacs ACT
For service as part of Operation Alliance.
Francis Stephen EVATT, Spence ACT
For service through the provision of assistance to victims and to their families following the Bali bombings.
Mark Thomas FRASER, Stirling ACT
For service through the provision of assistance to victims and to their families following the Bali bombings.
Clifton Gordon FROST,
For service as part of Operation Alliance.
John Robert GODWIN, Macgregor ACT
For service through the provision of assistance to victims and to their families following the Bali bombings.
David Mitchell GORNALL, Conondale QLD
For service as part of Operation Alliance.
Philip Victor GREEN, Sydney NSW
For service through the provision of assistance to victims and to their families following the Bali bombings.
Dr Peter HAERTSCH, Epping NSW
For service through the provision of medical assistance following the Bali bombings.
Brent Lewis HALL, Mawson ACT
For service through the provision of assistance to families of the victims of the Bali bombings.
Rebecca Anne HAMON, Conder ACT
For service through the provision of assistance to families of the victims of the Bali bombings.
Dr John Wilson HOGG, Wollongong NSW
For service through the provision of immediate medical assistance to victims of the Bali bombings.
Linda Elizabeth HOGG, Wollongong NSW
For service through the provision of immediate assistance to victims of the Bali bombings.
Detective Inspector Gregory Stuart HOUGH, VIC
For service as part of the police joint Bali bombing investigation and victim identification process, known as Operation Alliance.
David Bernard IMHOFF, Australian Consulate-General Hong Kong
For service through the provision of assistance to victims and to their families following the Bali bombings.
Stephen JACKSON,
For service as part of the police joint Bali bombing investigation and victim identification process, known as Operation Alliance.
Richard John JAMESON, Makati City Philippines
For service through the provision of assistance to victims and to their families following the Bali bombings.
John Benjamin JANSSEN, Kingston ACT
For service through the provision of assistance to families of the victims of the Bali bombings.
Peter Gerald JOHNSON, Bunbury WA
For service through the provision of assistance to victims and to their families following the Bali bombings.
Sheila Mary KAVANAGH, Mount Barker SA
For service through the provision of medical assistance to the victims of the bombings which occurred in Bali .
Michael Stuart KELSEY, Jakarta Indonesia
For service as part of the police joint Bali bombing investigation and victim identification process, known as Operation Alliance.
Karl Leslie KENT, AFP
For service as part of the police joint Bali bombing investigation and victim identification process, known as Operation Alliance.
Mark Geoffrey LAING, AFP
For service as part of the police joint Bali bombing investigation and victim identification process, known as Operation Alliance.
Kim Patricia LAMB, Barton ACT
For service through the provision of assistance to victims and to their families following the Bali bombings.
Detective Inspector Graham John LARCHIN, VIC
For service as part of the police joint Bali bombing investigation and victim identification process, known as Operation Alliance.
Fiona Jean LEONARD, Glen Forrest WA
For service through the provision of assistance to victims and to their families following the Bali bombings.
Christine Marie LINCOLN, Legian Bali Indonesia
For service through the provision of assistance to victims in the immediate aftermath of the Bali bombings.
Peter Wayne LORIMER, Marden SA
For service through the provision of medical assistance to the victims of the Bali bombings.
Janette Maree LYNAGH, Barton ACT
For service through the provision of assistance to victims and to their families following the Bali bombings.
Rodney Allan McBRIDE, Yass NSW
For service through the provision of assistance to victims and to their families following the Bali bombings.
Karen McCARTHY, Ubung Kaja Bali Indonesia
For service through the provision of assistance to victims of the Bali bombings.
Jason Paul McCARTNEY, Brighton VIC
For service to the community, particularly through support for the recovery of victims and families affected by the Bali bombings, and as a fund-raiser for trauma services.
Glen Duncan McEWEN, AFP
For service as part of the police joint Bali bombing investigation and victim identification process, known as Operation Alliance.
Lilly Anita McLAREN, Bundoora VIC
For service through the provision of assistance to victims and to their families following the Bali bombings.
Katrina Anne MAJA, Sanur Bali Indonesia
For service through the co-ordination of emergency medical assistance to victims of the Bali bombings.
Carole MANSFIELD, Fannie Bay NT
For service through the provision of medical assistance to the victims of the Bali bombings.
Clair Anne MARSH, Richmond VIC
For service through the provision of assistance to victims in the immediate aftermath of the Bali bombings.
Dr David Gregory MARSH, Richmond VIC
For service through the provision of immediate medical assistance to victims of the Bali bombings.
Francis Leigh MORGAN, AFP
For service through the provision of immediate support to victims and through liaison with Australian authorities directly following the Bali bombings.
Barry Francis MORLEY, Roleystone WA
For service through the provision of immediate medical assistance to victims of the Bali bombings.
Grace Nyema MORLEY, Roleystone WA
For service through the provision of immediate assistance to victims of the bombings which occurred in Bali on 12 October 2002.
Elizabeth Therese MORRIS, Campbell ACT
For service through the provision of assistance to victims and to their families following the Bali bombings.
Zabeta Elizabeth MOUTAFIS, Jakarta Selatan Indonesia
For service through the provision of assistance to victims and to their families following the Bali bombings.
Peter Andrew MUIR, Inverloch VIC
For service through the provision of assistance to victims of the Bali bombings.
Neil Allan MULES, Baghdad Iraq
For service through the provision of assistance to victims and to their families following the Bali bombings.
Charles Frederick MULLER, Canberra City ACT
For service as part of the police joint Bali bombing investigation and victim identification process, known as Operation Alliance.
Alison Faye MUSTAPHA, Darwin NT
For service through the provision of medical assistance to the victims of the Bali bombings.
Elizabeth Josephine O'NEILL, Kingston ACT
For service as a member of the Department of Foreign Affairs and Trade, Bali crisis taskforce through liaison with the media following the Bali bombings.
Detective Sergeant Adrian James PATERSON, VIC
For service as part of the police joint Bali bombing investigation and victim identification process, known as Operation Alliance.
Kim Amanda PATRA, Cheltenham SA
For service through the provision of assistance to victims and to their families in the immediate aftermath of the Bali bombings.
Mark James PEARSON, Narrabundah ACT
For service through the provision of assistance to victims and their families following the bombings which occurred in Bali.
Leo Thomas PRICE, Howard Springs NT
For service through the provision of medical assistance to the victims of the Bali bombings.
Francis Grant RAYNER, AFP
For service as part of the police joint Bali bombing investigation and victim identification process, known as Operation Alliance.
Tracy Fay REID, Barton ACT
For service as a member of the Department of Foreign Affairs and Trade
Sergeant Dianne REYNOLDS, SA
For service as part of the police joint Bali bombing investigation and victim identification process, known as Operation Alliance.
Jeffrey William ROACH, Dickson ACT
For service as a member of the Department of Foreign Affairs and Trade, Bali crisis taskforce through the provision of updated travel information to the Australian community following the Bali bombings.
David John ROYDS, Canberra City ACT
For service as part of the police joint Bali bombing investigation and victim identification process, known as Operation Alliance.
Pamela Jane SCOTT, Lindisfarne TAS
For service as part of the police joint Bali bombing investigation and victim identification process, known as Operation Alliance.
Victor Charles SEEDWELL, Kuta Bali Indonesia
For service through the provision of assistance to victims and to their families following the Bali bombings.
Trevor Noel SELLICK, Casuarina NT
For service through the provision of medical assistance to the victims of the Bali bombings.
Dr Peter Hamilton SHARLEY, Adelaide SA
For service through the provision of medical assistance to the victims of the Bali bombings.
Rodney John SHAWYER, Goulburn NSW
For service as part of the police joint Bali bombing investigation and victim identification process, known as Operation Alliance.
Julie Christina SHIELS, Jakarta Selatan Indonesia
For service through the provision of assistance to families of the victims of the Bali bombings.
Jennifer Lyn SILALAHI, Forest Hill VIC
For service through the provision of assistance to families of the victims of the Bali bombings.
Catherine Anne SIMPSON, Roleystone WA
For service through the provision of immediate medical assistance to victims of the Bali bombings.
Thomas Joseph SINKOVITS, Griffith ACT
For service through the provision of assistance to victims and to their families following the Bali bombings.
Julian James SLATER, AFP
For service as part of the police joint Bali bombing investigation and victim identification process, known as Operation Alliance.
Tammy Joanne SLEEP, Campbelltown SA
For service through the provision of medical assistance to the victims of the Bali bombings.
Donald Edward SMITH, Gordon ACT
For service through the provision of assistance to victims and their families following the Bali bombings.
Dr Dianne Patricia STEPHENS, Darwin NT
For service through the provision of medical assistance to the victims of the Bali bombings.
Paul Joseph STEVENSON, Sunnybank Hills QLD
For service through the provision of assistance to victims and their families following the Bali bombings.
Joseph Ivan STILLER, Riverstone NSW
For service as part of the police joint Bali bombing investigation and victim identification process, known as Operation Alliance.
Ruth Linfoot STONE, Narrabundah ACT
For service through the co-ordination of reports to Australian authorities on the situation in Bali following the Bali bombings.
Lorenzo STRANO, Ainslie ACT
For service through the provision of assistance to families of the victims of the Bali bombings.
Dr Jane Amelia TAYLOR, Adelaide SA
For service as part of the police joint Bali bombing investigation and victim identification process, known as Operation Alliance.
Dr Paul Terence TAYLOR, Sandy Bay TAS
For service as part of the police joint Bali bombing investigation and victim identification process, known as Operation Alliance.
Ronlynn Maree TAYLOR, Tiwi NT
For service through the provision of medical assistance to the victims of the Bali bombings.
Superintendent Andrew Graham TELFER, SA
For service as part of the police joint Bali bombing investigation and victim identification process, known as Operation Alliance.
Timothy Vincent TOOMEY, Ainslie ACT
For service through the provision of assistance to victims and their families following the Bali bombings.
James Patrick VICKERS, St Albans VIC
For service through the provision of assistance to victims of the Bali bombings.
Rosalyn Kaye WHEATLEY, Mascot NSW
For service through Qantas Airways in the facilitation of the departure of Australians from Bali and the repatriation of remains of deceased victims, and through liaison with family members of victims following the Bali bombings.
Edwin Barry WHITE, Nicholls ACT
For service through the provision of assistance to victims and their families following the Bali bombings.
Terryl Ann WHITE, Wulagi NT
For service through the provision of medical assistance to the victims of the Bali bombings.
William John WILKINSON, Sanur Bali Indonesia
For service through the provision of assistance to victims and to their families following the Bali bombings.
Dr Elizabeth Marie WILSON, Battery Point TAS
For service as part of the police joint Bali bombing investigation and victim identification process, known as Operation Alliance.
Linzi Marianne WILSON-WILDE, Canberra City ACT
For service as part of the police joint Bali bombing investigation and victim identification process, known as Operation Alliance.
Senior Sergeant Michael Joseph WRIGHT, SA
For service as part of the police joint Bali bombing investigation and victim identification process, known as Operation Alliance.
Catherine Patricia YATES, Jakarta Selatan Indonesia
For service through the provision of assistance to victims and to their families following the Bali bombings.

=== Honorary Officer (AO) in the General Division ===
Honorary awards are made to people who are not Australian citizens.

Police Inspector General I Made Mangku PASTIKA, Denpasar Bali Indonesia
(Appointment wef 11 October 2003) For service to Australia by heading the investigation into the Bali bombings.
Police General Drs Da'I BACHTIAR SH, Jakarta Indonesia
(Appointment wef 11 October 2003) For service to Australia, particularly the establishment of the joint investigation taskforce following the Bali bombings.

=== Honorary Member (AM) in the General Division ===
John Edward GREENWOOD, Burnside SA
For service to Australia by providing medical assistance to the victims of the Bali bombings.
Dr Peter Karl MAITZ, Point Piper NSW
For service to Australia by providing medical assistance to the victims of the Bali bombings.
Police Brigadier General Drs Gories MERE, Jakarta Selatan Indonesia
(Appointment wef 11 October 2003) For service to Australia through the investigation into the Bali bombings.
Dr Arthur Ichimura SORRELL, Venice CA USA
For service to Australia by providing medical assistance to the victims of the Bali bombings and to their families.

=== Honorary Medal (OAM) in the General Division ===
Putu Alit ARYANTHA, Denpasar Bali Indonesia
For service to Australia by providing consular assistance to the victims of the Bali bombings and to their families.
Stephanie Margaret BREEN, Kuta Bali Indonesia
For service to Australia by providing medical and other assistance to the victims of the Bali bombings and to their families.
Maureen BRITTIN, Casuarina NT
For service to Australia by providing medical assistance to the victims of the Bali bombings.
I Nyoman Yudiartha GIRI, Denpasar Bali Indonesia
For service to Australia by providing consular assistance to the victims of the Bali bombings and to their families.
Deborah MANDUAPESSY, Denpasar Bali Indonesia
For service to Australia by providing consular assistance to the victims of the Bali bombings and to their families.
Dr Didier Jon PALMER, Casuarina NT
For service to Australia by providing medical assistance to the victims of the Bali bombings.
Angky Donna SEPTIANA, Denpasar Bali Indonesia
For service to Australia by providing consular assistance to the victims of the Bali bombings and to their families.
Dharti SUTA, Denpasar Bali Indonesia
For service to Australia by providing consular assistance to the victims of the Bali bombings and to their families.
Wayan YULIASIH, Denpasar Bali Indonesia
For service to Australia by providing consular assistance to the victims of the Bali bombings and to their families.

== Public Service Medal (PSM) ==
The Public Service Medal is awarded to Australian public servants for outstanding service.

=== Commonwealth Public Service ===
Dr Bradley Joseph ARMSTRONG, Jakarta Selatan Indonesia
For outstanding public service in facilitating communication between the investigating teafrom the Australian Federal Police and the Indonesian National Police in the aftermath of the Bali bombings.
Desley Irene HARGREAVES, Carindale QLD
For outstanding public service in major disaster and crisis management, and through support for the victims of the Bali bombings and for their families.
Kenneth Paul HOOD, Monash ACT
For outstanding public service in the development and deployment of DNA identification procedures for the victims of the Bali bombings.
William Robert JACKSON, Calwell ACT
For outstanding public service in managing consular assistance to the victims of the Bali bombings and to their families.
Alice LEW, Essendon VIC
For outstanding public service in the provision of support as an airport liaison officer in Bali to Australian citizens in the Bali bombings.
Lisa Marian PAUL, Braddon ACT
For outstanding public service as Chair of the Commonwealth Bali Interagency Taskforce in the development of the Commonwealth's response in support of the victims of the Bali bombings.
Richard Campbell SMITH, AO, Canberra ACT
For outstanding public service as Australian Ambassador to Indonesia in managing and leading Australia's response in Indonesia following the Bali bombings.
Tracey Jane WUNDER, Port Moresby PNG
For outstanding public service through the provision of consular assistance to the victims of the Bali bombings and to their families.

== Conspicuous Service Cross (CSC) ==
The Conspicuous Service Cross is awarded for outstanding devotion to duty or outstanding achievement in the application of exceptional skills, judgement or dedication, in non-warlike situations.

=== Australian Army ===
Major David John READ, Casuarina NT
For outstanding achievement in the performance of duty as a medical specialist carrying out lifesaving procedures at the airport in Denpasar without the normal range of equipment or anaesthetic during Operation Bali Assist.
Captain Alasdair John STEHOUWER, Holsworthy NSW
For outstanding achievement in the performance of duty through providing linguistic services to facilitate liaison between the Australian Federal Police and Indonesian authorities following the Bali bombings and for tireless service to families of the victims through understanding and support at the time of victim identification.
Major Jonathan Nathanael STEINBECK, Rose Bay NSW
For outstanding achievement during the Bali bombing crisis in October 2002 in providing Australian Defence Force liaison to the Head of Defence Staff - Jakarta to facilitate evacuation plans for Australians, and in the establishment of professional procedures at the Sanglah Hospital morgue, Denpasar.
Colonel Neil Leonard THOMPSON, Bonython ACT
For outstanding achievement in effectively co-ordinating the evacuation of injured personnel from Bali to Australia as part of Operation Bali Assist.
Lieutenant-Colonel Susan Kaye WINTER, Coconut Grove NT
For outstanding achievement in the provision of exceptional medical care to critically injured victims of the bombings as the specialist medical officer to Operation Bali Assist.

=== Royal Australian Air Force ===
Squadron Leader Steven Patrick COOK, RAAF Base Richmond NSW
For outstanding achievement in the provision of medical care and comfort to critically injured victims of the bombings, while co-ordinating their Aeromedical evacuation as part of Operation Bali Assist.
Squadron Leader Gregory Alan WILSON, Corlette NSW
For conspicuous service, leadership and dedication in the transfer of grievously injured Australians from Bali hospitals and their speedy evacuation to Australia in his role as aeromedical evacuation co-ordinator for Operation Bali Assist.
Wing Commander Robert John WOOD, RAAF Base Williamtown NSW
For outstanding achievement in co-ordinating all aspects of Defence assistance to civil authorities as the Commander of the Australian Defence Force, Defence Supplementation Staff Team in Bali during Operation Bali Assist.

== Nursing Service Cross (NSC) ==
The Nursing Service Cross was a decoration (medal) of the Australian Honours System. The NSC was awarded for outstanding performance of nursing duties in both operational and non-operational situations.

=== Royal Australian Air Force ===
Flight Lieutenant Stephen Michael CRIMSTON, Windsor NSW
For outstanding devotion to duty and tireless work in the delivery of lifesaving care to the injured, and solace to their friends and relatives as a member of the Operation Bali Assist aeromedical evacuation team.

== Conspicuous Service Medal (CSM) ==
The Conspicuous Service Medal (CSM) is awarded for meritorious achievement or dedication to duty in non-war like situations.

=== Royal Australian Navy ===
Senior Chaplain Richard THOMPSON, Garden Island Navy Base NSW
For outstanding service in the provision of pastoral and administrative support to the relief effort in support of Operation Bali Assist, directly after the bombings.

=== Australian Army ===
Captain Rodney Damon COCKS, Burwood East VIC
For outstanding service in the provision of immediate first-aid and assistance in the evacuation of the many injured following the Bali bombings, and for providing crucial information that enabled the Australian Defence Force and United Nations to plan for medical teams and the evacuation of victims.
Chaplain Haydn Michele SWINBOURN, Durack NT
For outstanding service in the provision of pastoral support to families and friends of missing and deceased, assistance to next-of-kin in the identification of loved ones, and pastoral support to deployed members of Operation Bali Assist.

=== Royal Australian Air Force ===
Squadron Leader Paul Leslie BASTIN, Pyrmont NSW
For outstanding service as the Headquarters Australian Theatre principal Operations Branch staff officer responsible for the co-ordination and execution of the Australian Defence Force' s immediate response as part of Operation Bali Assist in providing direct support to victims of the bombings.
Leading Aircraftwoman Fiona Louise SCHOLES, RAAF Base Richmond NSW
For outstanding service as a member of the Aeromedical Evacuation Team
Warrant Officer Julie-Anne Lyn WILLES, Kingston ACT
For outstanding service in facilitating the entry and handling of aircraft of the Royal Australian Air Force into and through Indonesia, and for establishing formal processes for Disaster Victim Identification at Sanglah Hospital as part of Operation Bali Assist.
