= National Film and Sound Archive =

Australia's audiovisual archive

National Film and Sound Archive of Australia

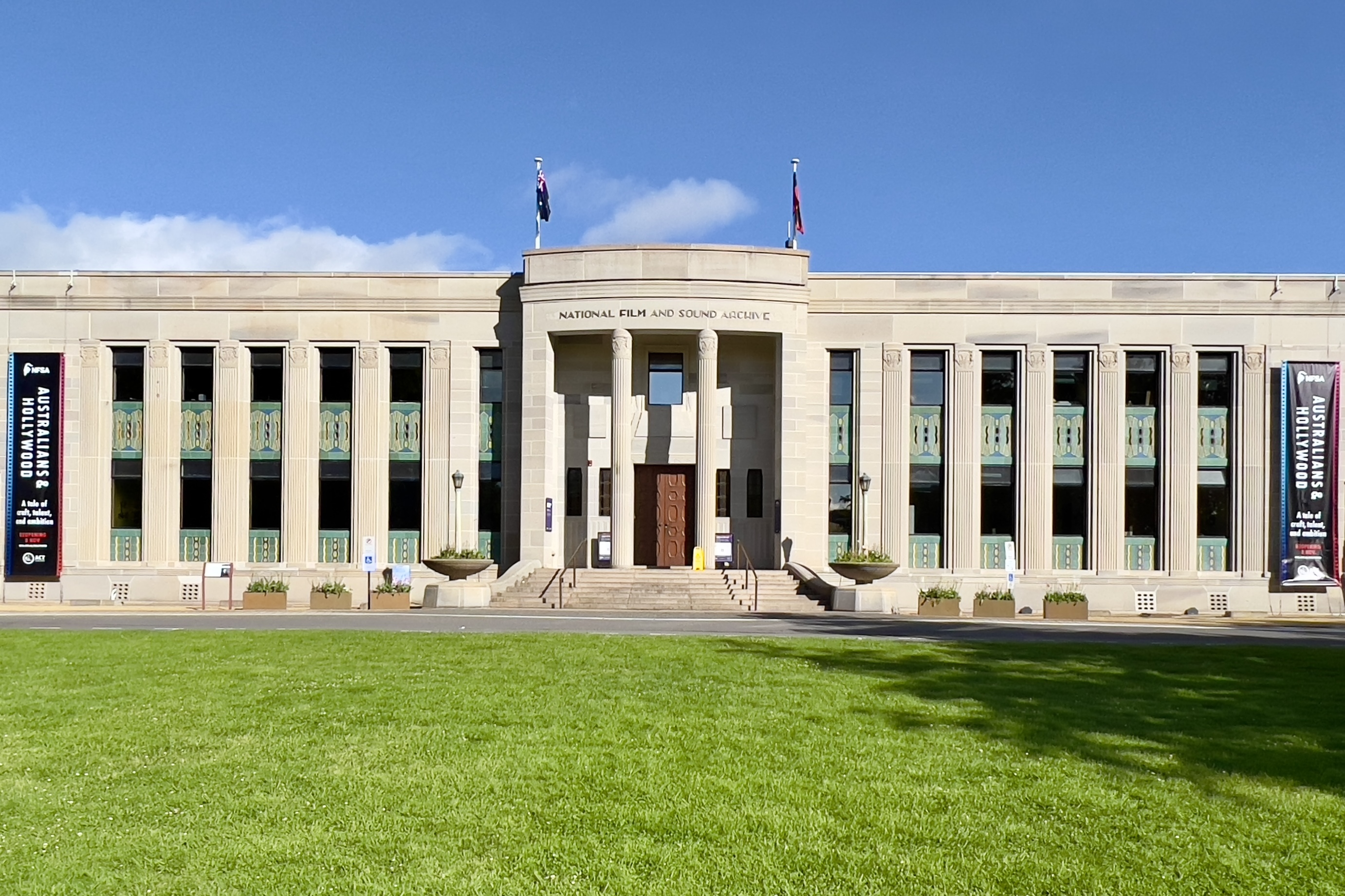
- Established: 5 April 1984
- Location: McCoy Circuit, Acton, Australian Capital Territory, Australia
- Coordinates: 35.283950°S 149.121075°E
- Type: Audiovisual Archive
- Collection size: 4 million+ items
- CEO: Patrick McIntyre
- Chairperson: Caroline Elliot
- Owner: Australian Government
- Employees: 223 (as of June 2023)
- Parking: Free parking surrounding the building on Liversedge Street
- Website: nfsa.gov.au

The National Film and Sound Archive of Australia (NFSA), based in Canberra and known as ScreenSound Australia from 1999 to 2004, is Australia's audiovisual archive, responsible for developing, preserving, maintaining, promoting, and providing access to a national collection of film, television, sound, radio, video games, new media, and related documents and artefacts. The collection ranges from works created in the late nineteenth century when the recorded sound and film industries were in their infancy, to those made in the present day.

The NFSA collection first started as the National Historical Film and Speaking Record Library (within the then Commonwealth National Library) in 1935, becoming an independent cultural organisation in 1984. On 3 October, Prime Minister Bob Hawke officially opened the NFSA's headquarters in Canberra.

== History of the organisation ==
The work of the archive can be officially dated to the establishment of the National Historical Film and Speaking Record Library (part of the then Commonwealth National Library, precursor to the National Library of Australia) by a Cabinet decision on 11 December 1935. It was continued post-War by the Library's Film Division.

After being part of the National Library of Australia (NLA) and its predecessors for nearly 50 years, the National Film and Sound Archive was created as a separate Commonwealth collecting institution through an announcement in Parliament on 5 April 1984 that took immediate effect. At that time, an Advisory Committee was established to guide the institution.

In 1999, the name was changed to ScreenSound Australia, and changed again in early 2000 to ScreenSound Australia, National Screen and Sound Archive. It reverted to its original name, National Film and Sound Archive, in December 2004.

In 2000, Screensound joined the PANDORA Archive, the web archiving project started by the NLA in 1996, as a collaborating partner.

Meanwhile, consequent on amendments to the Australian Film Commission Act which took effect on 1 July 2003 under the Howard government, it ceased to be a semi-autonomous entity within the Department of Communications, Information Technology and the Arts and became an integrated branch, later a division, of the Australian Film Commission, a funding and promotional body. The Archive Forum, of which filmmaker Martha Ansara was a founding member and Chris Puplick the chair, lobbied for the establishment of the NFSA as a statutory body from this date.

In 2007, the Liberal government announced the creation of a new agency to be called Screen Australia, which would incorporate the main functions of the Film Finance Corporation, the Australian Film Commission (including the Archive), and Film Australia.

Following elections in November 2007, the new Labor government implemented an election promise to allow the NFSA to become a statutory authority, similar to other major cultural institutions, including the National Library of Australia, the National Gallery of Australia and the National Museum of Australia. The National Film and Sound Archive Act 2008 became law on 20 March 2008 and came into effect on 1 July 2008, with celebrations held that day.

=== Inaugural board ===
The archive's first board as a statutory authority comprised:

- Chris Puplick AM (chair)
- Deb Verhoeven (deputy chair)
- Jill Matthews
- Grace Koch
- Catherine Robinson
- Andrew Pike OAM
- Philip Mortlock

== History of the building ==
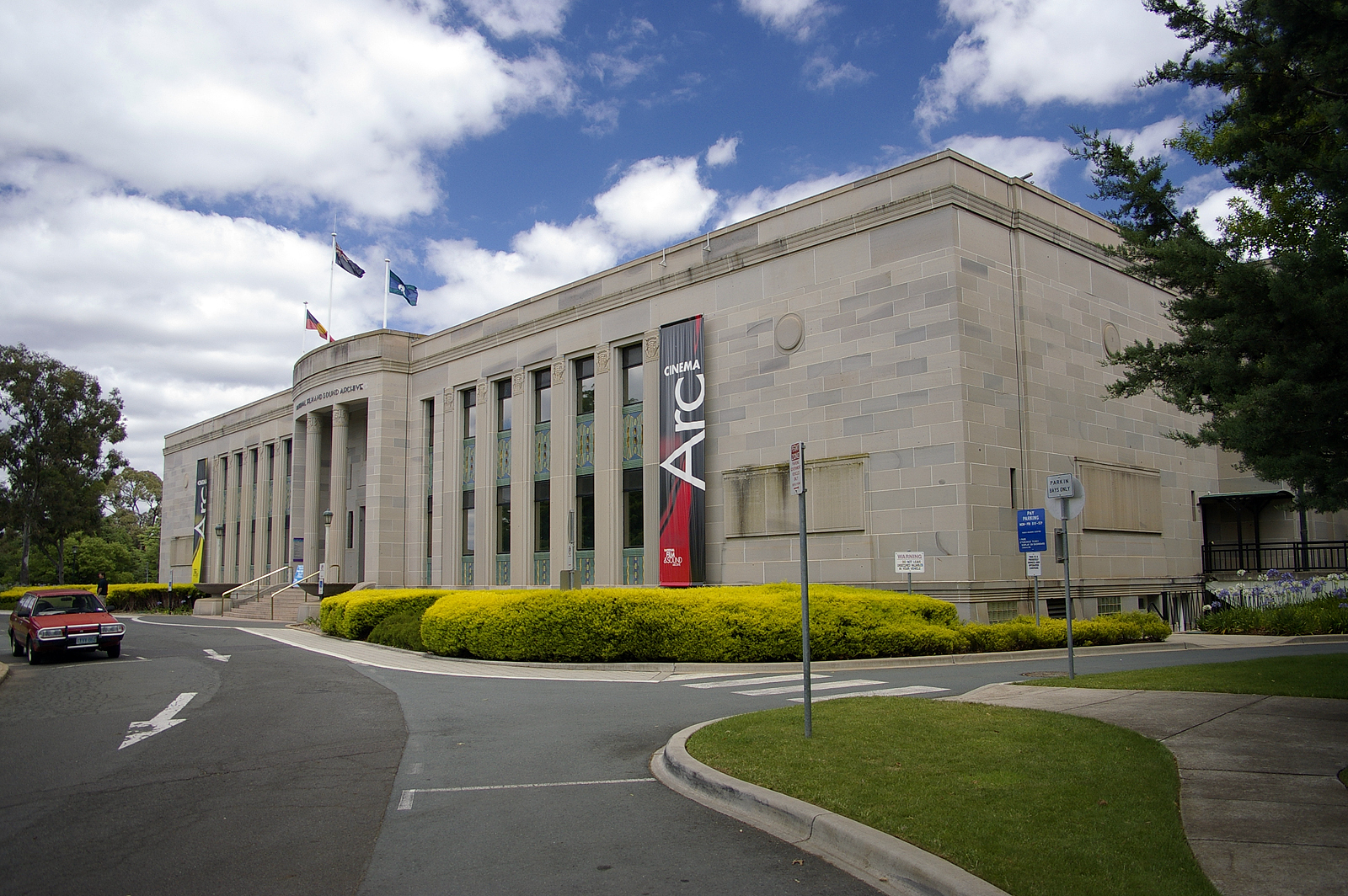
NFSA building, fronting onto McCoy Circuit

The building to which the Archive moved in 1984 was the home of the Australian Institute of Anatomy from 1931 to 1984. Originally it held the anatomy collection of Sir Colin MacKenzie.

The building is often classified as art deco, though its overall architectural style is technically "Late 20th Century Stripped Classical", the style of ancient Greece and Rome but simplified and modernised. It features a symmetrical façade, a horizontal skyline, classical columns and a central entrance. The decorative foyer features images of native flora, fauna and Aboriginal art and motifs. Face masks of well-known scientists from the late 19th century and early 20th century are featured on the foyer's walls as a reminder of its previous incarnation as the Institute of Anatomy.

The building also features a landscaped courtyard and theatre. In 1999, the building was extended to accommodate the Archive's growth. The new wing's design is in keeping with the Art Deco style of the main structure with details and finishes to match the original look.

In 2024, the NFSA won the Architecture and Building Conservation Award in the ACT Heritage Awards for the renewal of the building.

== Governance and people ==
=== Board ===
NFSA is governed by a board, as a statutory body. As of June 2024 the board members are:

- Annette Shun Wah (chair)
- Lucinda Brogden (deputy chair
- Kylie Bracknell
- Karina Carvalho
- Sachin Job
- Jaclyn Lee-Joe
- Carol Lilley
- Joe Thorp

=== Management ===
Day-to-day management and strategic planning is performed by the CEO. Past and present CEOs include:

- Michael Loebenstein (2011– January 2017)
- Meg Labrum, Head of Collection, Acting CEO (February-September 2017)
- Jan Müller (October 2017 – December 2020)
- Nancy Eyers, Chief Operating Officer, Acting CEO (January – September 2021)
- Patrick McIntyre (October 2021 – present) as of November 2024

== Collections ==
The NFSA collection includes more than four million items, encompassing sound recordings, radio, television, film, video games and new media. In addition to discs, films, videos, audio tapes, phonograph cylinders and wire recordings, the collection includes supporting documents and artefacts, such as personal papers and organisational records, photographs, posters, lobby cards, publicity, scripts, costumes, props, memorabilia, and sound, video and film equipment.

Notable holdings include:

- The Cinesound Movietone Australian Newsreel Collection, 1929–1975, a comprehensive collection of 4,000 newsreel films and documentaries representing news stories covering all major events in Australian history, sport and entertainment from 1929 to 1975. Inscribed on the Australian Memory of the World Register in 2003.
- The Story of the Kelly Gang (1906), directed by Charles Tait, is the first full-length narrative feature film produced anywhere in the world, and was inscribed onto the International Memory of the World Register in 2007.
- The earliest surviving Australian sound recording, "The Hen Convention", a novelty song by vocalist John James Villiers, with piano accompaniment, recorded by Thomas Rome in 1896, inducted into the Sounds of Australia.
- The earliest surviving film shot in Australia, Patineur Grotesque, footage of a man performing on rollerskates for a crowd in Prince Alfred Park, Sydney in 1896, shot by Marius Sestier.
- original costumes from Australian films such as The Adventures of Priscilla, Queen of the Desert, Muriel's Wedding, Elvis, Picnic at Hanging Rock, and My Brilliant Career.

A 2010 study compared the curatorial practices of accessioning and cataloging for NFSA collections and for YouTube with regard to access to older Australian television programs. It found the NFSA to be stronger in current affairs and older programs, and YouTube stronger in game shows, lifestyle programs, and "human interest" material (births, marriages, and deaths). YouTube cataloging was found to have fewer broken links than the NFSA collection, and YouTube metadata could be searched more intuitively. The NFSA was found to generally provide more useful reference information about production and broadcast dates.

=== NFSA Player ===
In June 2023 the NFSA launched the NFSA Player, a new digital streaming platform for on-demand content. The first content collection, Buwindja, was a curated selection of 17 titles reflecting the 2023 NAIDOC theme of For Our Elders.

In July 2024, NFSA Player made another 34 titles available for rent, including true crime and mystery, stories of postwar migration and early films from notable Australian artists and directors.

=== Video Games ===
The NFSA announced plans to collect Australian-developed video games as part of its collection starting in 2019, with new titles to be added on an annual basis.

In 2022 it joined with ACMI and The Powerhouse to acquire the hit multi-platform video game Untitled Goose Game, created by Victorian game developers House House.

In 2024, the NFSA published the first international video game preservation survey, in collaboration with The Strong Museum of Play (US) and with the support of the BFI National Archive (UK), and called for increased international collaboration and recognition to advocate for the needs of the video game preservation community.

=== Public Program ===
The NFSA runs a public program from its Acton building, including new release and repertory cinema screenings at Arc Cinema, panel discussions and Q&As, conferences, audiovisual installations, festivals and live music.

Free public spaces include The Library, restored in 2024 to house more than 280 items drawn from the full expanse of the National Film and Sound Archive collection, the Mediatheque, a lounge screening highlights from the audiovisual archive, and the Theatrette, which shows free documentaries on rotation.

=== Partnerships ===
The NFSA is a foundation partner of Sustainable Screens Australia and a founding member of the Australian Media Literacy Alliance.

=== 2023 Budget Funding / Revive ===
In April 2023, the Australian Government announced an investment of $535 million over four years into eight National Collecting Institutions, including $31 million over the same period for NFSA. The CEO of the NFSA Patrick McIntyre said “The new funds will turbocharge our ability to increase discoverability and access to the national collection for all Australians.”

=== Fantastic Futures ===
In October 2024, the NFSA curated and hosted the Fantastic Futures 24 Conference, the first in-depth Australasian examination of the challenges and opportunities of AI for the galleries, libraries, archives and museums sector.

=== Learning and Media Literacy ===
The NFSA runs a student media literacy program, Media and Me onsite at its Acton headquarters, which examines storytelling through animation, advertising, gaming, social media, film and music and explores how media has evolved over time in its methods of influencing and persuading viewers.

=== Special collections ===
- The Film Australia Collection contains a diverse range of more than 3,000 titles of Australian documentary and educational programs, spanning a century of Commonwealth documentary and docu-drama titles (1913–2008).
- Sounds of Australia (formerly the National Registry of Recorded Sound) is the NFSA's selection of sound recordings with cultural, historical and aesthetic significance and relevance, which inform or reflect life in Australia. It was established in 2007. Each year, the Australian public nominates new sounds to be added with final selections determined by a panel of industry experts.
- NFSA Restores is the NFSA's program to digitise, restore and preserve, at the highest archival standards, classic and cult Australian films so they can be seen on the big screen in today's digital cinemas.
- The Oral History Collection houses oral history recordings.
- The Non-Theatrical Lending Collection includes non-theatrical screenings, which take place on a non-commercial basis and are held by educational, cultural, social and religious institutions; community groups; churches; film societies; government bodies; hospitals; libraries; museums and galleries.
- The Australian Jazz Archive, established in 1997, was developed in partnership with state-based volunteer jazz archives. It includes published and unpublished recordings of Australian jazz bands and musicians, as well as personal collections, and covers Australian jazz since 1920.

== Preservation ==
Films are digitised as part of their preservation strategy, so that the original does not need to be seen as often. The oldest films in the collection, some over 100 years old and those made up until the 1950s, were made on nitrate cellulose film, of which NFSA holds around 10,000 cans. This type of film has a distinctive visual impact, being "very bright and colourful, dazzling..."; however, it also carries a high fire risk, and, if not properly stored, can deteriorate and become brittle. It needs to be kept cold and dry, but not too dry. Curator Jeff Wray believes that it is important to keep the original despite digitisation — "it has a great amount of information, a colour story, a technology story". Among other films made on nitrate cellulose, there is film of the Bodyline cricket series in the 1930s, and the first feature film ever made, The Story of the Kelly Gang, released in 1906. In May 2024, the federal government's budget allocated A$9.3 million towards the preservation of these films.

== Australian Screen Online ==
Australian Screen Online (ASO), also known as Australian Screen or australianscreen, is an online database operated by the NFSA. It has both a promotional and educational function, providing free worldwide online access to information about Australian cinema and the television industry in Australia.

ASO provides information about and excerpts from a wide selection of Australian feature films, documentaries, television programs, newsreels, short films, animations, and home movies, provided by a collaboration of the NFSA with the National Archives of Australia, the Australian Broadcasting Corporation, SBS, and the Australian Institute of Aboriginal and Torres Strait Islander Studies (AIATSIS). The educational content is designed for teachers and students, and includes a collection of film clips accompanied by teachers' notes and curators' notes written by experts.

Since the initial launch of the website on 18 July 2007, with more than 1500 Australian film and TV clips, it has won numerous awards as an educational resource and for its website design. The website was revamped and re-launched in 2009, including new features such as exclusive interviews with filmmakers, a news section, forums, games, detailed profiles of producers, directors, screenwriters, film score composers and actors. At the time, it reported about 90,000 visitors per month to the website, with 25 per cent coming from outside Australia.

== Friends of the NFSA ==
Friends of the National Film and Sound Archive is a volunteer organisation, run as an independently-run incorporated association. Its purpose is "to encourage links between the Archive, the film and sound communities and the general community". The organisation is based in Canberra, and has a branch in Melbourne. Andrew Pike of Ronin Films was instrumental in its establishment in 1999/2000, served as president and member of the board for many years, and as of December 2024 remains patron. Other patrons include Bryan Brown, Anthony Buckley, Chris Noonan, Philip Noyce, Alan Rydge, Fred Schepisi, and Patricia Amphlett ("Little Pattie").

== Awards ==
=== Ken G Hall Film Preservation Award ===
The Ken G Hall Film Preservation Award was established in 1995 as a tribute to producer/director Ken G Hall. It is presented in recognition of an individual, group, or organisation, for their outstanding contribution to the art of moving image and its preservation. It is presented to candidates where there is a significant link between their work and its impact or relationship to the Australian film industry. Examples of this contribution include technical innovation, scholarship in the field, involvement with the survival of film as an art form and as a cultural experience, advocacy, sponsorship and fundraising.

- 2012 Susanne Chauvel Carlsson
- 2011 David Hannay
- 2010 Patricia Lovell
- 2009 Ian Dunlop
- 2006 Paul Cox
- 2005 Phillip Noyce
- 2004 Graham Shirley
- 2003 Tom Nurse
- 2002 Judy Adamson
- 2001 Murray Forrest
- 2000 Anthony Buckley
- 1999 Joan Long
- 1998 Not awarded
- 1997 Kodak Australasia
- 1996 Peter Weir
- 1995 Alan Rydge and Rupert Murdoch

=== National Folk Recording Award ===
The NFSA National Folk Recording Award was established in 2001 to encourage and reward excellence in Australian folk music recording. Award entrants are selected from recordings submitted each year to the National Folk Festival in Canberra. The judging panel comprises representatives from the National Folk Festival, ABC Radio and the Archive.

- 2013 Not a Note Wasted by Luke R Davies and the Recycled String Band
- 2012 Carried in Mind by Jeff Lang
- 2011 Love and Sorrow by Kavisha Mazzella
- 2010 A Voice that was Still by Chloe and Jason Roweth, with Jim McWhinnie
- 2009 Urban Sea Shanties by Fred Smith and the Spooky Men's Chorale
- 2008 The Next Turn by Trouble in the Kitchen
- 2006 Diamond Wheel by Kate Fagan
- 2005 Songs of the Wallaby Track by Dave de Hugard
- 2004 The Fig Tree, a musical companion to Arnold Zable's book produced by The Boite
- 2003 Swapping Seasons by Kate Burke and Ruth Hazleton
- 2002 Bagarap Empires by Fred Smith
- 2001 Follow the Sun by Seaman Dan

=== Cochrane-Smith Award for Sound Heritage ===
The Cochrane-Smith Award for Sound Heritage recognises the achievements of a person who has made a substantial contribution to the preservation, survival and recognition of sound heritage. It is named for Fanny Cochrane Smith, who features on the only known recording of Tasmanian Aboriginal songs and language.

- 2012: Ros Bandt
- 2011: Bill Armstrong
- 2010: Karl Neuenfeldt

=== Orlando Short Film Award ===
The Orlando Short Film Award is an annual celebration of Australia's best lesbian, gay, bisexual, transgender or intersex short films. It recognises the nation's cultural diversity and the role screen culture plays within the broader community.

- 2012 Craig Boreham Writer and director of Drowning
- 2011 Grant Scicluna Writer and director of Neon Skin

=== Award for an Emerging Cinematographer ===
First presented in 2010, the NFSA and Australian Cinematographers Society John Leake OAM Award for an Emerging Cinematographer, also known as the NFSA-ACS John Leake OAM ACS Award and John Leake OAM ACS Emerging Cinematographer Award, is designed to enable emerging cinematographers to develop their craft, and is presented annually at the Australian Cinematographers Society Awards. The award is named in honour of Australian Cinematographers Society (ACS) co-founder and industry icon John Leake OAM (1927–2009). The inaugural winner of the award was Kirsty Stark.

=== Preservation Award ===
The South East Asia Pacific Audiovisual Archives Association (SEAPAVAA) NFSA Preservation Award recognises the extraordinary efforts of individuals or organisations within the South East Asia and Pacific region in preserving or promoting audiovisual archiving in the region. It is presented at the annual SEAPAVAA conference.

- 2012 Kae Ishihara

== Exhibitions ==
The following exhibitions have been developed by the NFSA:

- The Art of Sound, in collaboration with regional art galleries
- Starstruck: Australian Movie Portraits, in partnership with the National Portrait Gallery of Australia. The exhibition premiered in Canberra from 10 November 2017 – 4 March 2018, followed by an Australian tour including Adelaide, Gold Coast, Bathurst, and Geraldton.

From August 2018, the NFSA re-opened its exhibition gallery to present temporary exhibitions, including:

- Australians & Hollywood, from 21 January 2022 to 28 January 2024
- Heath Ledger: A Life In Pictures, from 10 August 2018 to 10 February 2019, developed by the Western Australian Museum
- The Dressmaker Costume Exhibition, from 18 April to 18 August 2019, developed by FilmArt Media and curated by designer Marion Boyce
- Game Masters: The Exhibition, from 27 September 2019 to 9 March 2020, developed by the Australian Centre for the Moving Image
- Mervyn Bishop: The Exhibition, about Aboriginal Australian Australian news and documentary photographer Mervyn Bishop, from 5 March to 1 August 2021. This exhibition is drawn from the Art Gallery of New South Wales (AGNSW) collection, the artist's private archive, and enriched by sound and moving image from the NFSA.

In 2023, to mark the centenary of radio in Australia, the NFSA published a digital exhibition, Radio 100.

== See also ==
- List of music museums
- Sounds of Australia
