= Australia–Kosovo relations =

- Australia: Kosovo

Diplomatic mission
- Australian Embassy, Zagreb: Embassy of Kosovo, Canberra

Envoy
- Ambassador Elizabeth Petrovic: Ambassador Hajdin Abazi

Australia–Kosovo relations refer to the bilateral relations of Australia and Kosovo. Kosovo and Australia officially established diplomatic relations on 21 May 2008. Kosovo has an embassy in Canberra, which was opened in February 2013. The Ambassador of Australia to Kosovo is subordinate to the embassy in Vienna.

== History ==
In 1999, Australia initially refused to join NATO in accepting extra refugees from Kosovo, offering only temporary asylum to visitors trapped in Australia by the war in Yugoslavia.

This decision was quickly overruled by Prime Minister John Howard who authorised nearly 4,000 Kosovo refugees temporary visas to stay in Australia. Also in 1999, Australia provided $500,000 to Kosovar refugees in Australia to teach them how to avoid landmines before flying home. Australia encouraged the voluntary return of many of the 4,000 refugees it had provided temporary protection visas. Refugees were provided with $3,000 each to help them resettle.

In 2000, the forced return of refugees from Kosovo by Australia and numerous other countries was criticised by the head of the United Nations administration in Kosovo, Bernard Kouchner. Australia removed 114 families in a detention centre and deported them despite a last-minute appeal to John Howard, the prime minister.

== Relations ==
=== Australian recognition of Kosovo ===
The Assembly of Kosovo unilaterally declared the independence of the United Nations administered territory from Serbia as the Republic of Kosovo on 17 February 2008. Australia recognised the state on 19 February 2008. The decision to recognise the Republic of Kosovo was made despite Australian commentators like Michael McKinley claiming it could adversely affect relations with Russia, China, Romania and Spain. On the day Kosovo declared independence, Prime Minister Kevin Rudd of Australia said that "We've already indicated to our diplomatic representatives around the world that this (independence) would be an appropriate course of action". Milivoje Glisic, the Serbian ambassador to Australia, called the declaration of independence illegal, and he was recalled to Belgrade by the Serbian government for consultations on 20 February 2008.

=== Australia at the ICJ ===
On 30 September 2008, in a trial vote regarding the legality of Kosovo's independence at the United Nations General assembly there was a vote at the request of the Serbian authorities. Australia abstained from this vote.

=== 2010s and 2020s ===
Various Kosovo government ministers have visited Australia for official or non-official visits. In 2014, Minister for the Diaspora Ibrahim Makolli met immigration minister Scott Morrison and had many meetings with Albanian Australian communities in Sydney and Melbourne. In 2015, Naim Dedushaj, Director of the Diaspora Investment Support Department visited Australia to strengthen and connect Albanian businesses of the local diaspora with Albanian areas of the Balkans. Diaspora Minister Valon Murati visited Albanian Australian communities and attended Albanian Independence Day celebrations in 2016. Former Kosovo president Atifete Jahjaga visited Australia in 2018 and met with the then Australian Foreign Affairs minister Julie Bishop, Bob Carr, the former Foreign Minister, Quentin Bryce, the former Governor General and other Australian officials of the Foreign Affairs and Trade Department.

The Kosovo embassies based in Australia and New Zealand organised a conference in Canberra 2015 regarding Albanian Australians on the importance of integration and maintenance of links with Albanian areas of the Balkans. It was attended by academics, students and Australian politicians.

At times, Kosovo's Australian ambassador has attended Kosovo independence celebrations among the local Albanian community in Australia. In 2021, the Melbourne Albanian community organised a gathering to remember the Kosovo Liberation Army, its struggle and legacy of eventual of Kosovo independence.

== See also ==
- Foreign relations of Australia
- Foreign relations of Kosovo
- Australia–Serbia relations
- Australia–Yugoslavia relations
- Albanian Australians
