= Holmes à Court Gallery =

Art gallery in Western Australia

Coordinates: 33.8237°S 115.0483°E

The Holmes à Court Gallery is an art gallery in Western Australia. It has two locations—a gallery located in the original Vasse Felix winery at Cowaramup (near Margaret River) and another in West Perth. It is owned by Janet Holmes à Court.

== Exhibits ==
The gallery displays works from the Holmes à Court Collection through a series of seasonal exhibitions. There is a sculpture garden extending into the grounds of the Vasse Felix winery, where sculptures by local artists are displayed in a garden setting. In 2013, the gallery installed The Art of Sound exhibition in collaboration with the National Film and Sound Archive.

== History ==
The gallery was previously located in East Perth until it closed in October 2010.

== Collection ==
The Holmes à Court family was interested in Australian art and commenced a collection in the early 1970s. The collection is now internationally renowned as it has over 5000 artworks, many of them being culturally significant works.
