= Tooled Up =

Studio album by The Spooky Men's Chorale
- Released: January 2005
- Genre: Folk
- Label: Independent

Professional ratings
Review scores
Source	Rating
Sydney Morning Herald	link

Tooled Up is the debut album by The Spooky Men's Chorale. The album has sold over 4,000 copies since its release in January 2005, both at performances and through local and international internet sales. Several tracks have aired on ABC Classic FM, ABC Local Radio and community and internet radio.

== Track listing ==
1. "The Spooky Theme"
2. "Not Pretty Enough"
3. "Don't Stand Between a Man and His Tool"
4. "And I Love Her"
5. "Ghost Riders in the Sky"
6. "Georgia"
7. "Shen Har Venahi"
8. "Mess Song"
9. "Mraval Jamier"
10. "(I Can't Get No) Satisfaction"
11. "Vote The Bastards Out"
12. "Down in the River to Pray"
