= The Art of Sound (exhibition) =

2013 art exhibition in Australia

Coordinates: 35.283°S 149.121°E

The Art of Sound (Exhibition)
- Country: Australia
- Presented by: National Film and Sound Archive
- Website: The Art of Sound on NFSA

The Art of Sound is an exhibition which was developed in 2013 by the National Film and Sound Archive (NFSA) in collaboration with regional art galleries in Australia, and the University of Sydney to explore the use of sound in the visual arts.

The curators at the NSFA compiled a sound palette, which comprises a wide variety of Australian audio recordings from the NFSA's sound collection. There are music, speeches, and sounds from the environment. The curators at partner art galleries search the sound palette to find audio material that would complement their individual artworks and combine them for unique audience experiences at each gallery.

== Partnerships and locations ==
The project included a partnership with James Hurley, composer and sound artist from the University of Technology, Sydney (UTS).

The gallery partners in the project in 2013-2014 included four regional Australian galleries:

- the Grafton Regional Gallery in northern NSW (23 January – 13 February 2013)
- the Holmes à Court Gallery at Vasse Felix in Margaret River, WA (9 June – 15 September 2013)
- Caboolture Regional Art Gallery in Queensland (19 October – 14 December 2013)
- Burnie Regional Art Gallery in Tasmania (9 May – 29 June 2014)

The exhibition allowed the materials in the NSFA to provide access to its collection of audiovisual materials to the people in regional Australia, and allowed regional galleries to showcase their collections to wider audiences.

The Art of Sound was supported by the National Collecting Institutions Touring and Outreach Program (an Australian Government program which supports projects that make collections available to all Australians).

== Items in the collection used in the exhibition ==
The exhibition sound palette included original compositions of Archie Roach and Percy Grainger, performances of the Sydney Symphony Orchestra, Dame Joan Sutherland, and Skyhooks, speeches, experimental works by Scattered Order, the spoken word, and environmental recordings of Not Drowning Waving. Other artists included the Dirty Three, Mark Atkins, Hunter & Collectors, and The Necks.
