= Australia–North Macedonia relations =

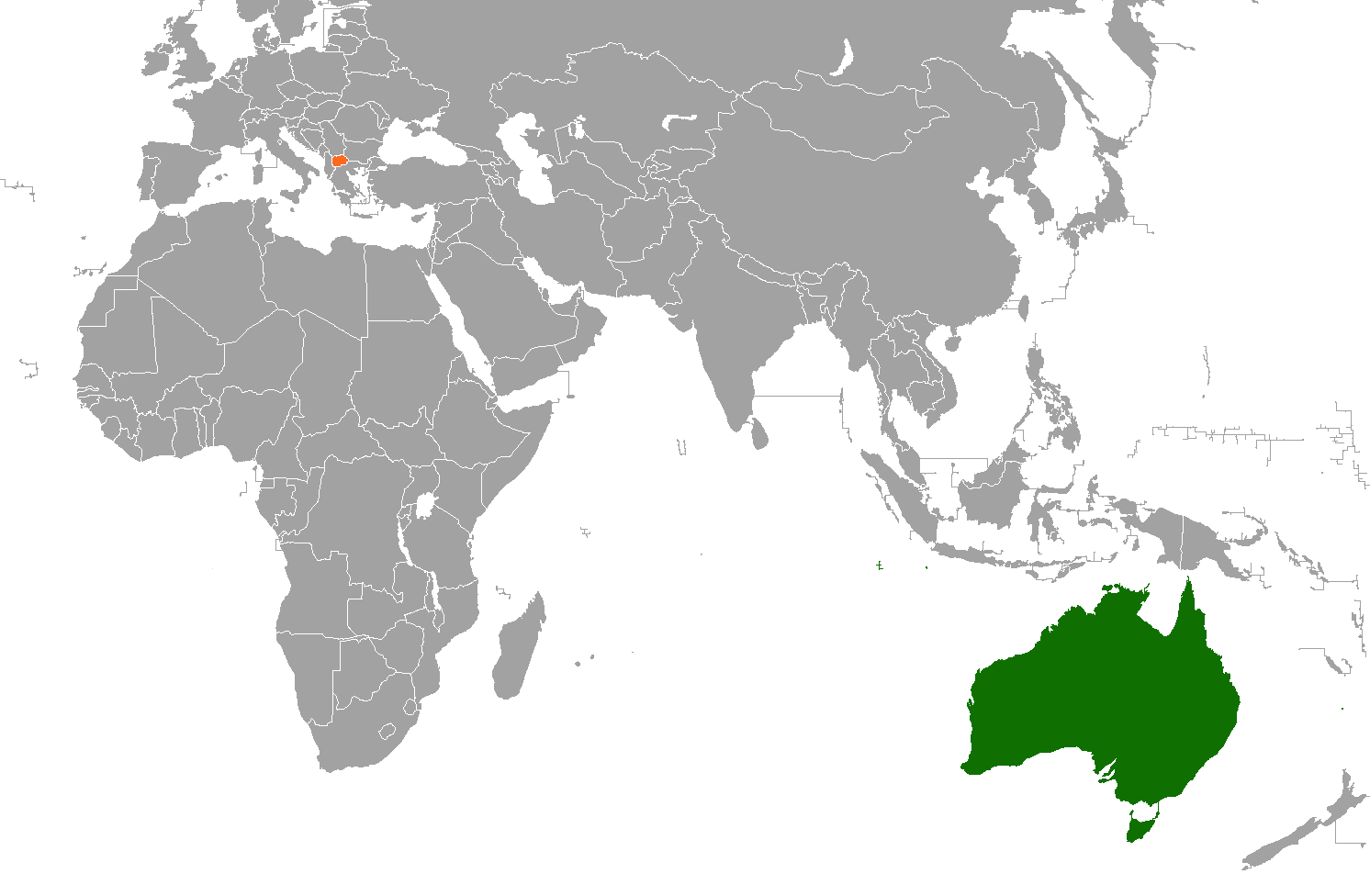

- Australia: North Macedonia

Australia–North Macedonia relations are the bilateral relations between Australia and North Macedonia. Australia is represented in North Macedonia through its embassy in Belgrade, Serbia, while North Macedonia has an embassy in Canberra and has a consulate-general in Melbourne.

== History ==
Australia recognized the independence of North Macedonia, then known as the former Yugoslav Republic of Macedonia, in 1994 and established relations in 1995.

In February 2025, Foreign Minister of North Macedonia Timco Mucunski paid an official visit to Australia meeting with Foreign Minister of Australia, Penny Wong.

== Macedonian diaspora in Australia ==
The population from North Macedonia in Australia is officially acknowledged to be around 100,000 by ancestry, but there is about 200,000 people claim by the community. Historically, while record about Macedonian presence to Australia surfaced in 19th century, the community came to Australia much later than other former Yugoslav diasporas, they only came to Australia by 1920s and 1930s as was known as Yugoslavs back then. The second migration occurred in 1960s. The Macedonian community has largely integrated and does not have problem with the local population.

== Resident diplomatic missions ==
- Australia is accredited to North Macedonia from its embassy in Belgrade, Serbia.
- North Macedonia has an embassy in Canberra and a consulate-general in Melbourne.

== See also ==
- Foreign relations of Australia
- Foreign relations of North Macedonia
- Australia–Yugoslavia relations
- Macedonian Australians
