= John Greenwood (surgeon) =

Burns surgeon in Adelaide (born 15th June 1963)

- Born: John Edward Greenwood; 1962 or 1963 (age 62–63); Lancashire, England
- Occupation: Burns surgeon
- Known for: Treatments for burns
- Awards: Honorary Member of the Order of Australia (2003); SA Australian of the Year (2016)

Dr John Edward Greenwood AM is an English-Australian surgeon. He has been head of the burns service at the Royal Adelaide Hospital since 2001. He was the South Australian Australian of the Year for 2016.

Greenwood was born in Lancashire, England, and studied medicine at the University of Manchester. He moved to Adelaide in 2001 when he was headhunted to run the Adult Burns Unit.

Greenwood was made an Honorary Member of the Order of Australia on 17 October 2003 as part of a special honours list for providing medical assistance to victims of the 2002 Bali bombings. His career has been in treating acute burns patients. He has developed new techniques and skin substitutes to treat severe burns. He was awarded Doctor of Health Sciences in 2013 for a thesis documenting the establishment of the Adult Burn Service in South Australia.
