= List of ambassadors of Australia to the Federated States of Micronesia =

Ambassador of Australia to the Federated States of Micronesia

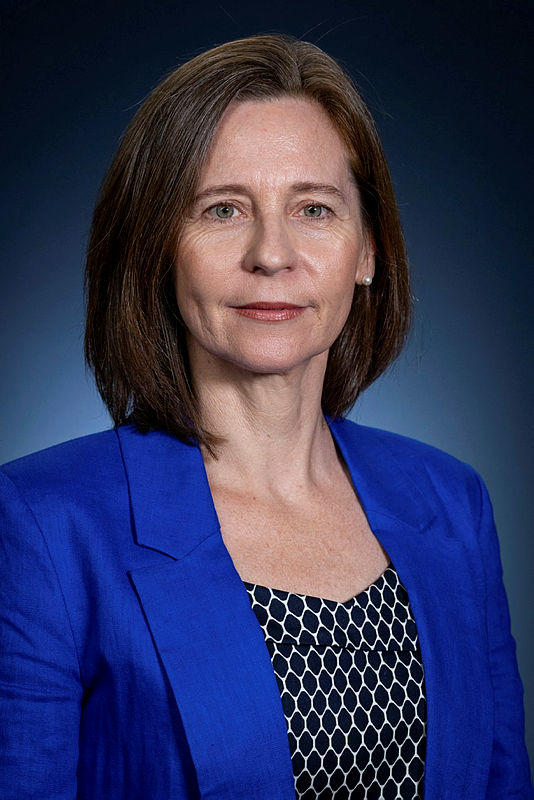
- Incumbent; Jenny Grant-Curnow since April 2024
- Department of Foreign Affairs and Trade
- Style: His Excellency
- Reports to: Minister for Foreign Affairs
- Nominator: Prime Minister of Australia
- Appointer: Governor General of Australia
- Inaugural holder: Ric Smith (Consul-General residing in Honolulu)
- Formation: 1987

The Ambassador of Australia to the Federated States of Micronesia is an officer of the Australian Department of Foreign Affairs and Trade and the head of the Embassy of the Commonwealth of Australia to the Federated States of Micronesia. Australia first established diplomatic relations with the Federated States of Micronesia in 1987 and the Australian Embassy in Pohnpei was opened in November 1989. Prior to the establishment of the embassy, representative functions were carried out by the Consul-General residing in Honolulu. The current ambassador, since April 2024, is Jenny Grant-Curnow.

== List of ambassadors ==
Ordinal	Officeholder	Term start date	Term end date	Time in office	Notes
1	Ric Smith	1987	1989	1–2 years	
2	Ken Brazel	1990	1991	0–1 years	
3	P. S. B. Stanford	1991	1995	3–4 years	
4	Perry K. Head	1995	1998	2–3 years	
5	Tim Cole	1998	2001	2–3 years	
6	Brendan Doran	2001	2004	2–3 years	
7	Corinne Tomkinson	2004	2007	2–3 years	
8	Susan Cox	2007	2011	3–4 years	
9	Martin Quinn	2011	2014	2–3 years	
10	Terry Beven	2014	2015	0–1 years	
11	George Fraser	2016	2020	3–4 years	
12	Jo Cowley	2020	2024	3–4 years	
13	Jenny Grant-Curnow	April 2024	incumbent	2 years, 5 months	
