= Australia–Yugoslavia relations =

Australia-Yugoslavia relations
- Australia: Yugoslavia

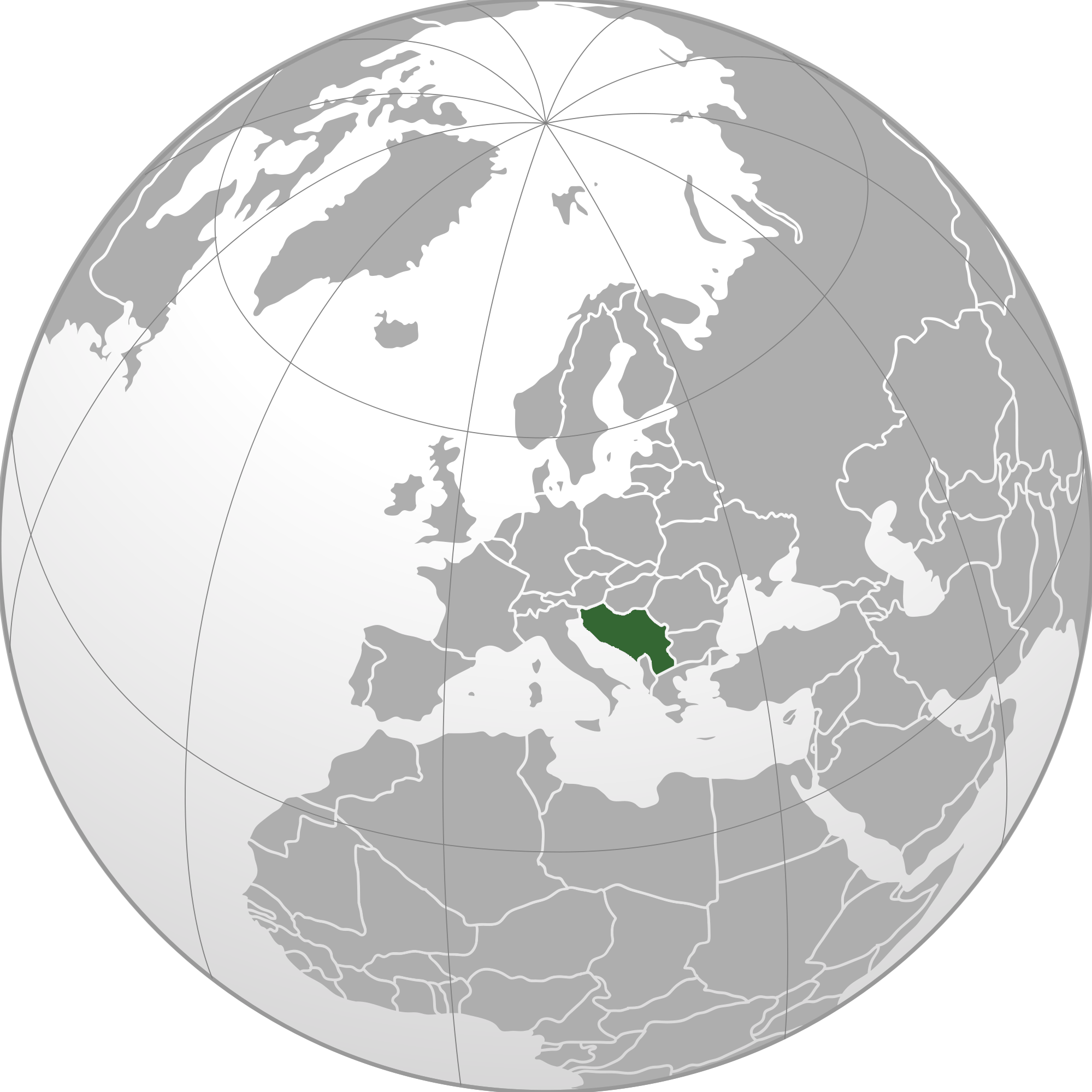
Australia and Yugoslavia

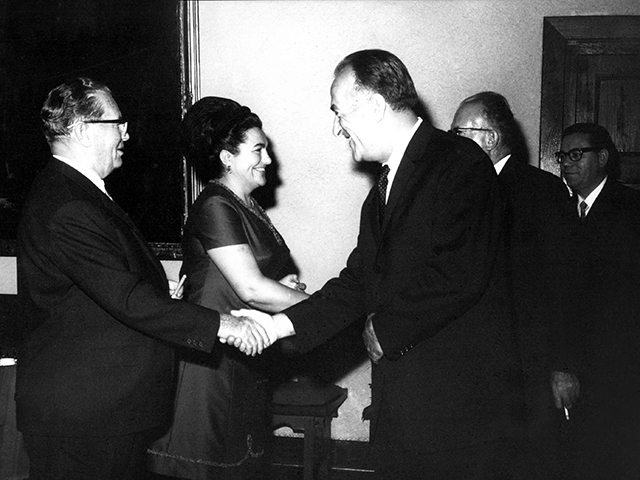
President of Yugoslavia Josip Broz Tito and First Lady Jovanka Broz with Australian Minister for Foreign Affairs Paul Hasluck in 1968.

Australia–Yugoslavia relations (Serbian: Односи Аустралије и Југославије; Croatian: Australsko-jugoslavenski odnosi; Slovene: Odnosi med Avstralijo in Jugoslavijo; Macedonian: Односите Австралија-Југославија) were historical foreign relations between the now split-up Socialist Federal Republic of Yugoslavia and Australia. Australia and Yugoslavia established formal diplomatic relations in 1966. The two countries decided to establish diplomatic missions, initially at the chargé d'affaires level, to facilitate practical contacts, particularly in the field of migration. Australia recognized the advantages of special relations and contacts with other countries in Eastern Europe but also the role it played in many of the meetings and activities of Non-Aligned countries. Relations between the two countries were complicated by poor experiences of Yugoslav immigrants in Australia, which was often perceived to be significantly prone to radical nationalism, anti-Yugoslavism, and even widespread sympathies for World War II collaborationist movements. A delegation of the Yugoslav parliament visited Australia in 1970, while a delegation of the Parliament of Australia, led by William Aston, visited in turn in February 1971.

In 1988, a pro-Croatian, anti-Yugoslav demonstration in front of the Yugoslav Consulate in Sydney ended with a security guard, Zoran Matijaš, shooting and wounding 16-year-old Josef Tokic. This led to a diplomatic crisis between the two countries when the Australian authorities presented the consulate with an ultimatum to surrender Matijaš, which consular officials rejected. Both countries expelled a number of diplomats.

Following the breakup of Yugoslavia and the Yugoslav Wars, Australian judges Ninian Stephen, David Hunt and Kevin Parker served with the International Criminal Tribunal for the former Yugoslavia. Australia also contributed military personnel to the United Nations Protection Force, Implementation Force and Stabilisation Force in Bosnia and Herzegovina.

== See also ==
- Yugoslavia and the Non-Aligned Movement
- Death and state funeral of Josip Broz Tito
- Australia–Croatia relations
  - Croatian Australians
- Australia–Kosovo relations
- Australia–North Macedonia relations
  - Macedonian Australians
- Australia–Serbia relations
  - Serbian Australians
- Australia–Slovenia relations
  - Slovenian Australians
- Yugoslavia at the 1956 Summer Olympics
- Australia at the 1984 Winter Olympics
