= Susan Cox (diplomat) =

Australian diplomat

Susan Cox OAM
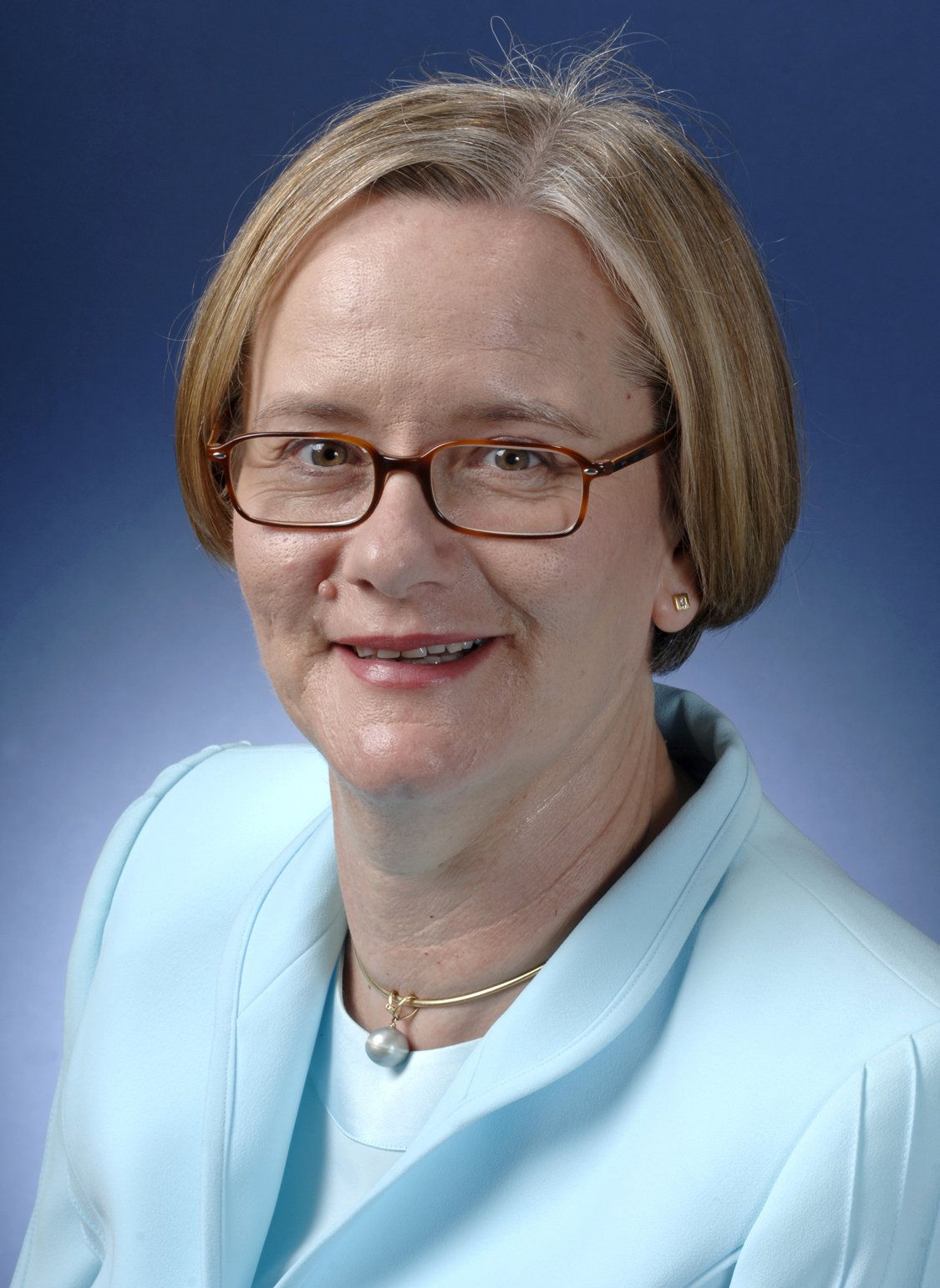
- Cox in 2007
- Education: University of Canberra (BA)
- Occupations: Public servant, diplomat

Susan Cox is an Australian diplomat and is a career officer with the Department of Foreign Affairs and Trade. She has served in several ambassadorial positions, including as Australian Ambassador to the Federated States of Micronesia from 2007 to 2011 and Australian Ambassador to Croatia from 2012 to 2017.

== Life and career ==
From 1990 to 1993, Cox was Australia's Vic-Consul in New Caledonia. Between 1993 and 1998 she worked in areas of the Department of Foreign Affairs and Trade (DFAT) that focused on Pacific policies. In 1998 she was appointed Deputy High Commissioner in Vanuatu, a role she served in until 2001.

She was manager of DFAT's Consular Coordination Unit from 2002 to 2003, before joining the Consular Policy and Crisis Management Section (where she worked between 2003 and 2006). In 2003 she was awarded an Order of Australia Medal for her work assisting victims and their families following the Bali bombings, she was one of 199 people recognised for their work in the wake of the attacks.

Cox took up an appointment as Australian Ambassador to the Federated States of Micronesia in 2007, formally presenting her credentials to the President in November 2007. During her tenure, Cox regarded the Pacific patrol boat program, which financially supports the Federated States of Micronesia's maritime surveillance capacity, as the central pillar of the bilateral security relationship. When reflecting on the role at the end of the posting in 2011, Cox described President Mori signing the Pacific Partnership for Development Agreement with Australia as one of her major achievements. The agreement meant that the Federated States of Micronesia had a separate, direct agreement with Australia for aid, with specific aid goals. Cox had also signed a treaty for the exchange of tax information between Australia and the Marshall Islands, in 2010.

On 28 September 2012, Cox was appointed Australian Ambassador to Croatia. and she presented her credentials to Croatian President Ivo Josipović on 14 December 2012.

Diplomatic posts
Preceded by Corinne Tomkinson	Australian Ambassador to the Federated States of Micronesia; 2007 – 2011	Succeeded by Martin Quinn
Preceded by Beverly Mercer	Australian Ambassador to Croatia; 2012 – 2017	Succeeded by Elizabeth Petrovic
