= Iain Campbell Smith =

Iain Campbell Smith OAM
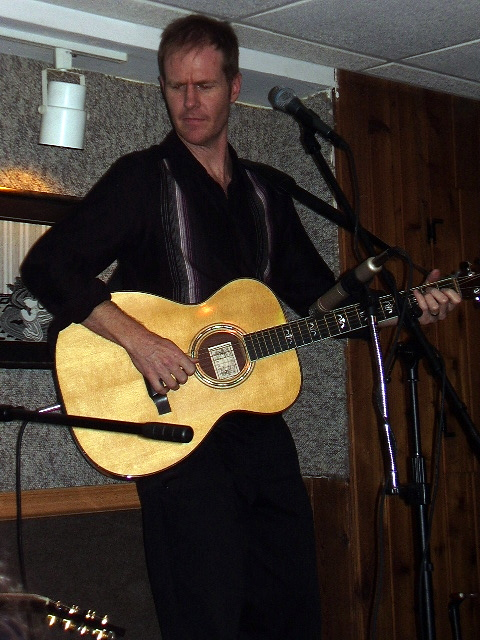
- Smith performing at a house concert
- Born: Canberra, ACT, Australia
- Occupations: Diplomat; Singer/songwriter
- Years active: 1997–present
- Spouse: Maryanne Voyazis
- Parent(s): Janet and Ric Smith
- Musical career
- Also known as: Fred Smith
- Genre: Folk music
- Instruments: Guitar, Harmonica
- Website: fredsmith.com.au

Iain Campbell Smith is an Australian diplomat, singer/songwriter and comedian. He performs under the stage name Fred Smith in Australia and his full name in the United States.

== Early life ==
Smith was one of two sons to Janet and Ric Smith. His family moved to India when he was six weeks of age. Before the age of 12, when he began boarding school in Canberra, Smith had also lived in Israel and the Philippines.

== Diplomatic career ==
Smith joined the Australian Department of Foreign Affairs and Trade (DFAT) in 1996 and worked in the Indonesia, South Asia, and Human Rights sections. Postings included the Australian High Commission in Port Moresby and international peace monitoring missions in Papua New Guinea and the Solomon Islands. He served as a civilian peace monitor in Bougainville Province between 1999 and 2001. He hosted a weekly program "Saredi Nait Pati" ("Saturday Night Party") on Radio Bougainville.

Smith speaks fluent Melanesian pidgin, and regularly conducts lectures on the Bougainville peace process.

In July 2009, he was the first DFAT civilian to be posted to Uruzgan as part of the second Mentoring and Reconstruction Task Force. He served most of his 18-month tour of the province living and working on the Multinational Base in Tarin Kowt, and at a Forward Operating Base in the Chora Valley.

== Musical career ==
As a sideline, Smith began performing his own songs at pubs and clubs around Canberra under the stage name Fred Smith. His first show was at age 16, covering a selection of Simon and Garfunkel songs. Smith released his first album Soapbox in 1997. He has appeared at numerous Australian and international folk festivals.

While in Bougainville Province, Smith talked extensively in pidgin with the locals about the peace process and set some of their ideas to music. The songs, performed by Smith with local musicians, were compiled on a cassette titled Songs of Peace and 20,000 copies were distributed around the province. The albums Bagarap Empires and Independence Park, and the documentary film Bougainville Sky are responses to his work with the peace monitoring mission.

Around 2002 Smith wrote a number of songs for a female vocalist. He began a search for the right woman, and began working with the singer and double bass player Liz Frencham, forming Frencham Smith.

He moved to Washington, D.C. in 2006, touring the USA presenting his songs and guest lectures in peace studies. and returned to Australia in late 2007 with an album of songs from that time entitled "Texas".

While working in Uruzgan, he travelled with his guitar and entertained Afghanis as well as the Dutch and Australian troops stationed there. On his return to Australia from Afghanistan he released Dust of Uruzgan, an album of songs responding to the war in Afghanistan. Speaking about the album with Newcastle Live in January 2016, Smith said "we made a positive difference in Uruzgan province in the time we were there and I want the Australian public to know that."

In 2025, Smith was awarded the Medal of the Order of Australia for his service to music and foreign affairs.

== Albums ==
As Fred Smith

- Soapbox (1997)
- Songs of Peace (1999)
- Bagarap Empires (2001)
- Party Pieces (2002)
- Independence Park (2005)
- Texas (2007)
- Dust of Uruzgan (2010)
- Home (2014)
- Great (2017)
- Domestic (2020)
- Look (2023)

As Iain Campbell Smith

- Ballads and Barsongs (2006)
- Bagarap Empires (2005 reissue to coincide with the release of Bougainville Sky)

As Frencham Smith (with Liz Frencham)

- Into My Room (2003)
- lovethongs (2007)

With The Spooky Men's Chorale

- Urban Sea Shanties (2009)

== Book release ==
In 2016, Allen & Unwin published Smith's book The Dust of Uruzgan. The book, which Smith wrote over an eight-month period between 2015 and 2016, is a memoir of detailing his experiences as a diplomat in Uruzgan, Afghanistan.

== Personal life ==
Smith is married to Maryanne Voyazis and the couple live in O'Connor, Australian Capital Territory. Together they have a daughter, who was born in January 2014.
