= Australia–Serbia relations =

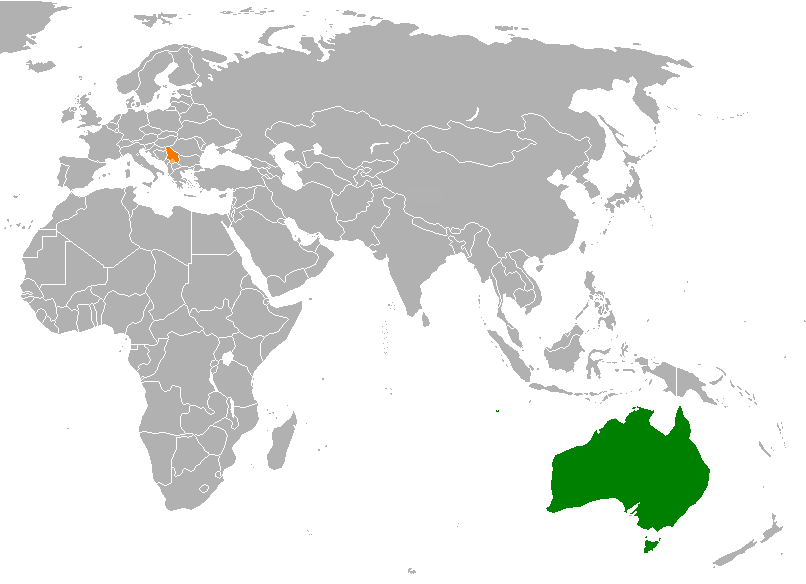

- Australia: Serbia

Australia and Serbia maintain diplomatic relations established between Australia and SFR Yugoslavia in 1966. From 1966 to 2006, Australia maintained relations with the Socialist Federal Republic of Yugoslavia (SFRY) and the Federal Republic of Yugoslavia (FRY) (later Serbia and Montenegro), of which Serbia is considered shared (SFRY) or sole (FRY) legal successor.

== Political relations ==
The Australian government took over all the bilateral treaties and agreements signed with the former Yugoslavia in its relations with Serbia, with reserve of cessation of certain contracts if they are considered to be surpassed. There are nine agreements in force, among which the most important are Trade Agreement, Agreement of residence and employment of Serbian citizens in Australia and the Agreement on cultural cooperation. Cultural and education relations are based on the 1976 Agreement on cultural and scientific cooperation.

There have been no visits of heads of state or government between two countries in recent years. The delegation led by MPs Roger Price and Danna Vale and Senator Judith Troeth visited Serbia in 2008 while the delegation led by the President of the National Assembly of Serbia Slavica Đukić Dejanović visited Australia in 2009.

The European office of the Australian Federal Police is located in Belgrade since 2003.

== Economic relations ==
Trade between two countries amounted to $62 million in 2022; Australian merchandise export to Serbia were about $31 million, consisting primarily of toys, games and sporting goods; Serbian exports were about the same, standing at $31 million, consisting mainly of preserved food products.

== Immigration from Serbia ==
According to the 2021 census there were 94,997 people in Australia who identified as having Serb ancestry, making it a significant group within the global Serb diaspora. The Serbian Australian community is heavily concentrated (about 70% of the total) in New South Wales and Victoria, with major hubs in Sydney's south-eastern suburbs and Melbourne's western and south-eastern suburbs.

== Resident diplomatic missions ==
- Australia has an embassy in Belgrade.
- Serbia has an embassy in Canberra and a consulate general in Sydney.
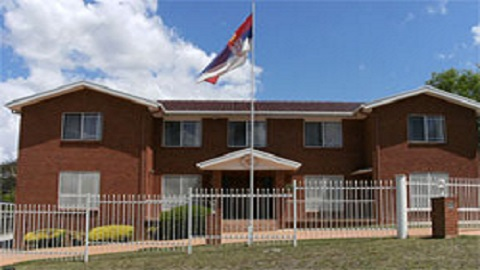
Embassy of Serbia in Canberra

== See also ==
- Foreign relations of Australia
- Foreign relations of Serbia
- Australia–Yugoslavia relations
