= Australia–Croatia relations =

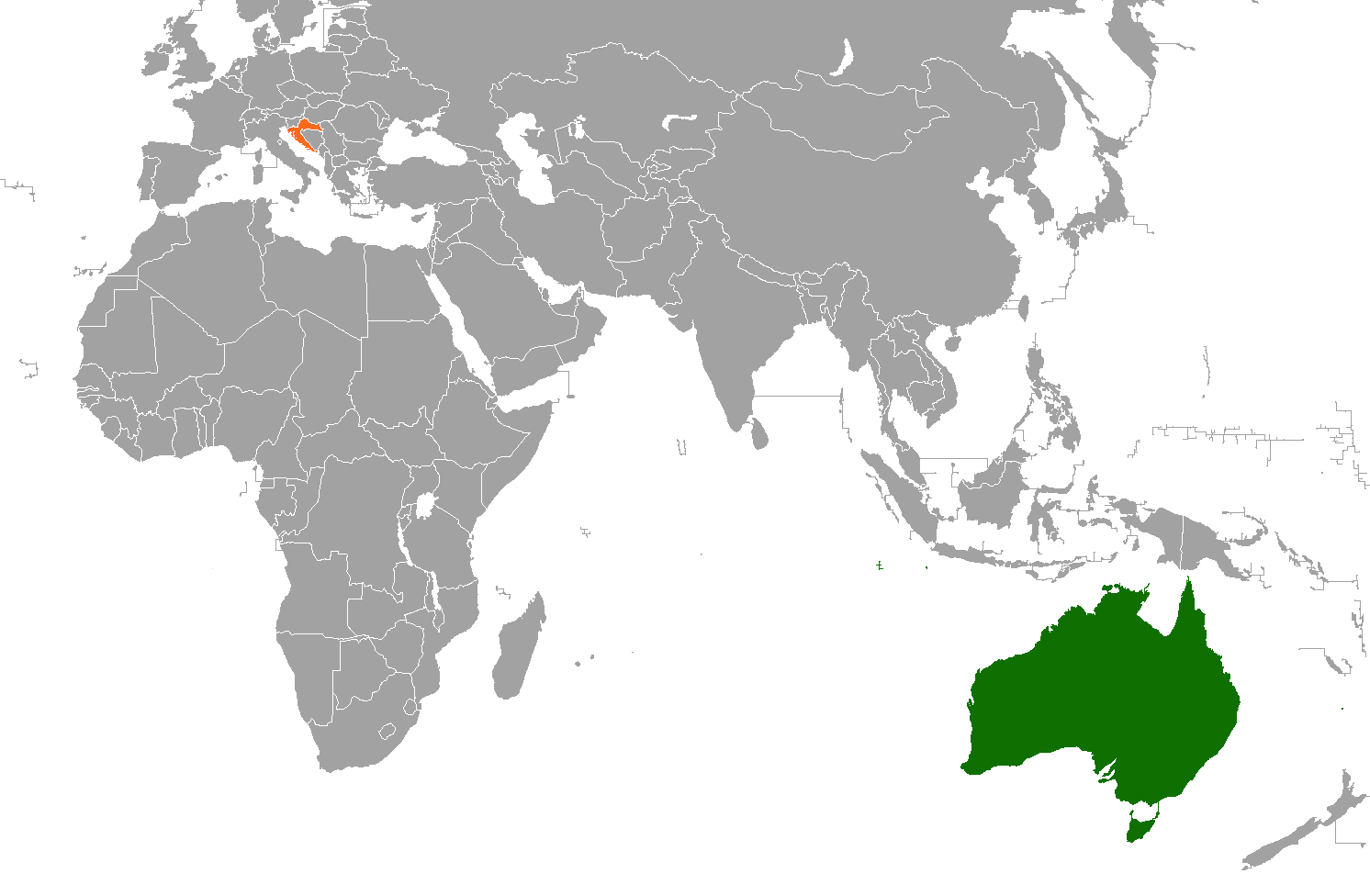

- Australia: Croatia

Foreign relations exist between Australia and Croatia. Australia has an embassy in Zagreb, and Croatia has an embassy in Canberra.

== History ==
Australia and Croatia first established formal diplomatic relations when Croatia announced independence from Yugoslavia in 1992. Australia opened its consulate in Croatia during the same year, and the two countries have remained on friendly terms since that time. Currently, the Australian embassy is located in Zagreb, and the Croatian embassy is located in Canberra. In 1999, the Australian consulate was upgraded to an embassy. One of the aims of Australia–Croatia foreign relations is to promote cooperation and free trade between the two countries.

== People's movement ==
Croats first migrated to Australia in the 1850s, when Croatia was part of the Austrian Empire. They were either known as Austrians or Italians at the time, and, after World War I, were known as Yugoslavs. Croatian migrants came with diverse backgrounds, and included intellectuals, communists, fascists, refugees, and anti-communists. They became officially recognized as Croats in 1992 after the breakup of Yugoslavia during the Yugoslav Wars.

Croats in Australia have been successfully integrated into the mainstream of Australian society thanks to shared culture and customs. However, in several cases, Croats have also faced discrimination and troubles with the Australian authorities, notably in the 1960s and 1970s.

== Economic relations ==
Australia's merchandise trade with Croatia in 2018 was AUD$41.1 million, up 3.9% from 2017. Australian goods exports to Croatia totalled AUD$$2.8 million in 2018, the major exports being fruit and nuts, as well as specialized machinery and parts.

Since Croatia joined the European Union in 2013, economic relations between Croatia and Australia have boomed. The free trade agreement between the European Union and Australia, signed in 2019, was viewed positively in Croatia.

== Resident diplomatic missions ==
- Australia has an embassy in Zagreb.
- Croatia has an embassy in Canberra and consulates-general in Melbourne and Sydney and a consulate in Perth.

== See also ==
- Foreign relations of Australia
- Foreign relations of Croatia
- Croatian Australians
- Australia–Yugoslavia relations
- Australia–European Union relations
