= The Spooky Men's Chorale =

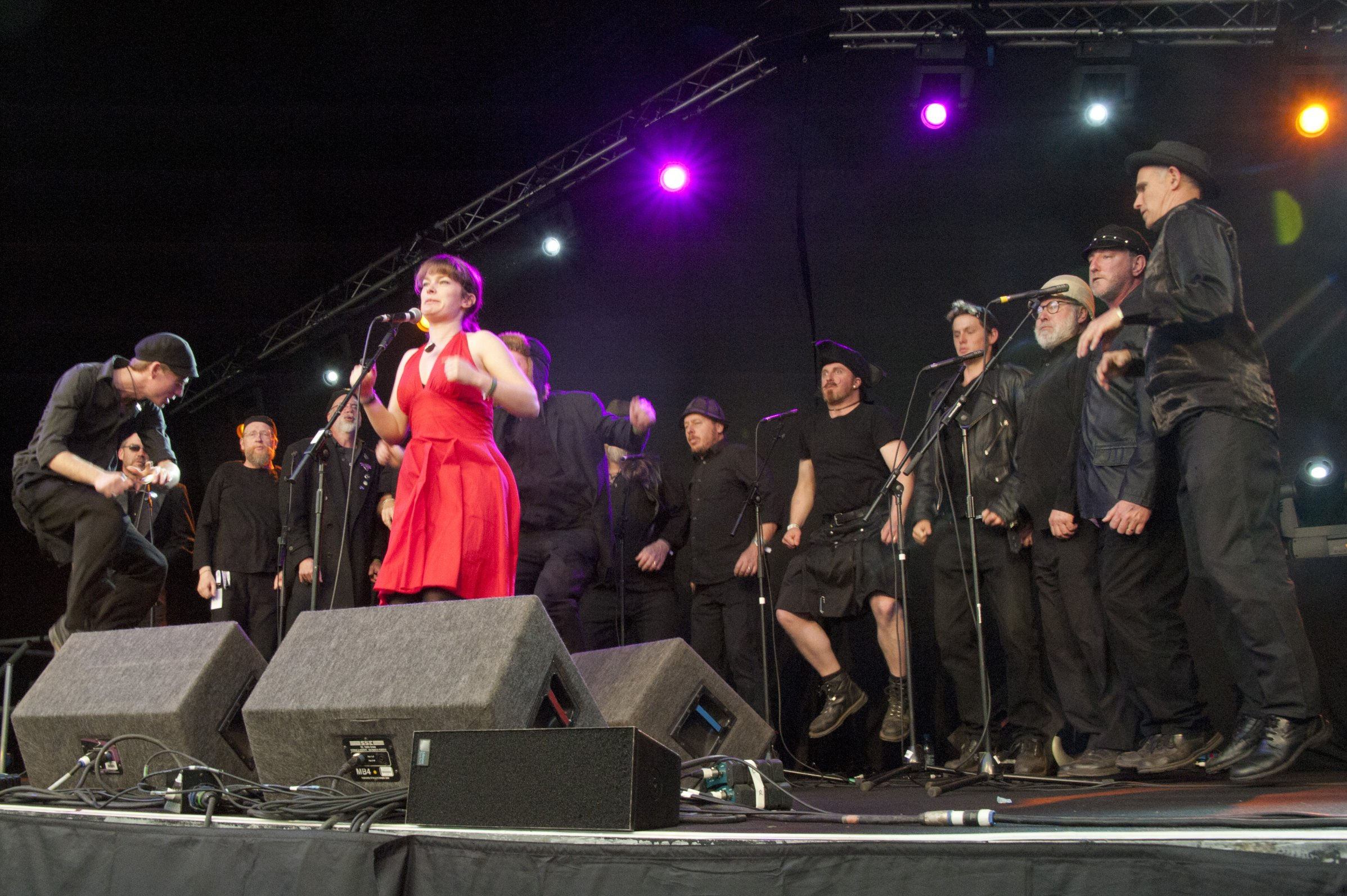
- With Kate Rowe

Background information
- Origin: Blue Mountains, New South Wales, Australia
- Genres: Folk
- Years active: 2001–present
- Labels: Independent
- Website: spookymen.com

The Spooky Men's Chorale is a group of Australian male singers, formed in the Blue Mountains of New South Wales in 2001.

Their repertoire consists of songs written or arranged by their director (or "Spookmeister") Stephen Taberner: a judicious combination of commentary on the absurdity and grandeur of the modern male, pindrop beautiful ballads, highly inappropriate covers, and immaculate man anthems like “Don’t Stand Between a Man and his Tool”. They also perform traditional Georgian music, a major influence on their compositions, harmonies and vocal style.

== History ==
The Spooky Men's Chorale were created by Stephen Taberner and made their first appearance in August 2001 as part of an evening called "This was nearly my life" at Paddington Uniting Church, Sydney. Taberner claims he called up every man he knew who could sing and "taught them 3 songs, and asked them to show up wearing black and with an interesting hat." The three songs were "Vineyard", a Georgian church song, "Georgia", a mock Georgian original, and "The Mess Song". The latter was an existential rumination on the aftermath of breakfast written by New Zealand's Don McGlashan and Harry Sinclair of The Front Lawn.

In the first couple of years the group performed and rehearsed sporadically until the National Folk Festival of Easter 2004, held in Canberra, which effectively launched the group and where, thereafter, they became cult figures. The gig at the National was also the debut of what would become the Spooky theme song ("We are the Spooky Men, we dream of mastodons ...") which typified the brand of humour they were beginning to define. The attention received at the National Folk Festival in 2004 gave rise to a series of opportunities to put their music before a wider audience, and they are now a staple at folk festivals.

In the UK/Europe they have appeared at major festivals including Tonder (Denmark), WOMAD, Cropredy, Cambridge, Broadstairs, Wickham, Camp Bestival, Towersey, Shrewsbury, Sidmouth, and Edinburgh Fringe. Theatrical venues have included Union Chapel (London), St David’s Hall (Cardiff), The Philharmonic (Liverpool), Colston Hall (Bristol), the Sheldonian (Oxford) and Sage Gateshead.

== Members ==
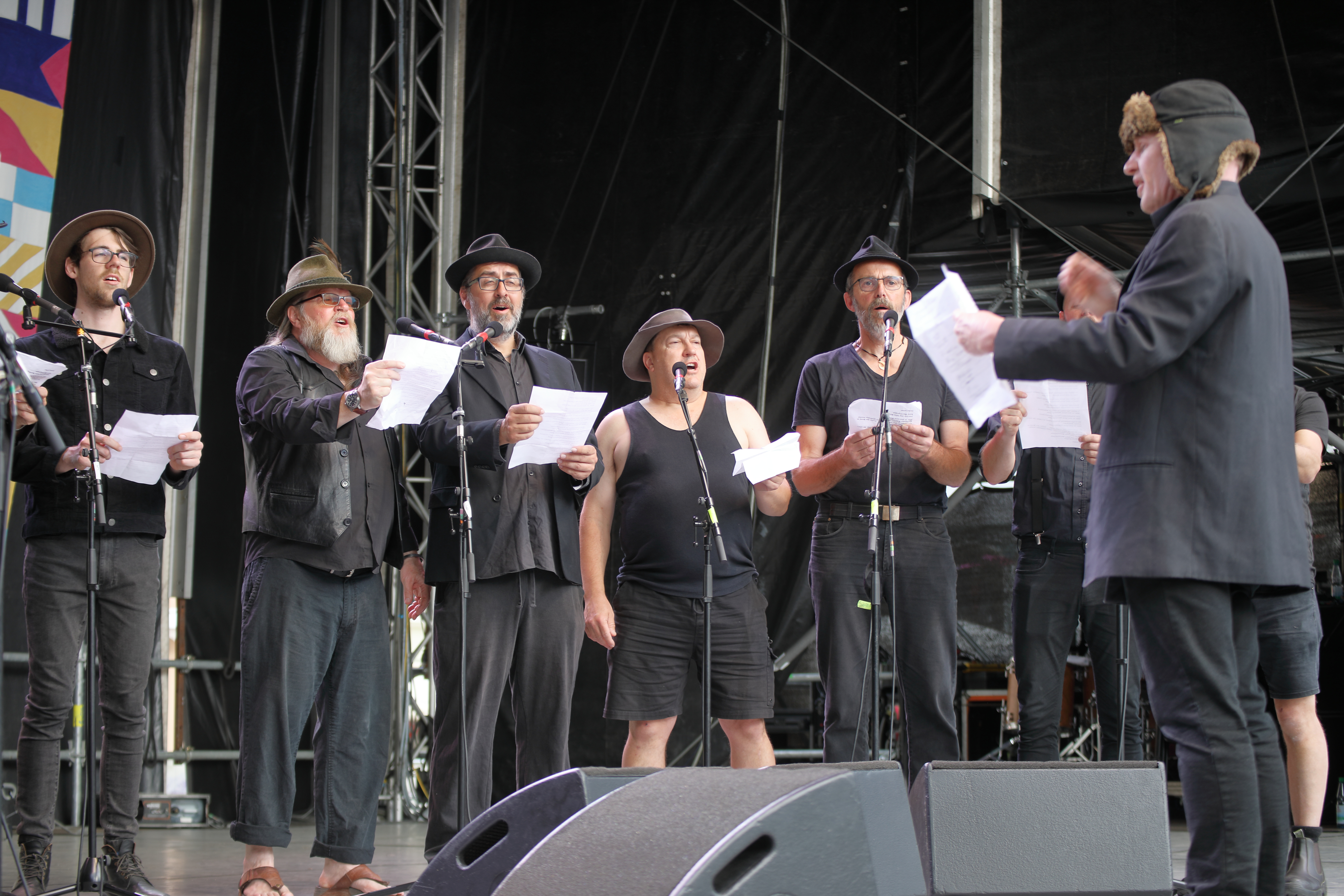
The Spooky Men's Chorale performing "Wir sind keine Männergruppe" ("We are not a Men´s Group") at Rudolstadt-Festival 2019

The Spooky Men's Chorale typically perform with between 12 and 16 singers, the exact number at any one time depending on the particular circumstances, locations and so on. When touring in the UK and Europe, the group are regularly joined by several UK based singers. The UK contingent also perform in their own right as A Fistful of Spookies.

== Discography ==
=== Albums ===
- Tooled Up (2004)
- Stop Scratching It (2007)
- Urban Sea Shanties (2009) - Fred Smith and the Spooky Men's Chorale
- Deep (2009) with DVD
- The Spooky Man in History (2013)
- Warm (2015)
- Welcome to the Second Half (2019)
- We'll Give it a Go (2024)

=== EPs ===
- Big (2011) containing three tracks ("Big", "The Thing", "The Man in the 17th Row")
