= Representative office of Australia, Ramallah =

Representative office of Australia to the State of Palestine

Australian Representative to the Palestinian Authority

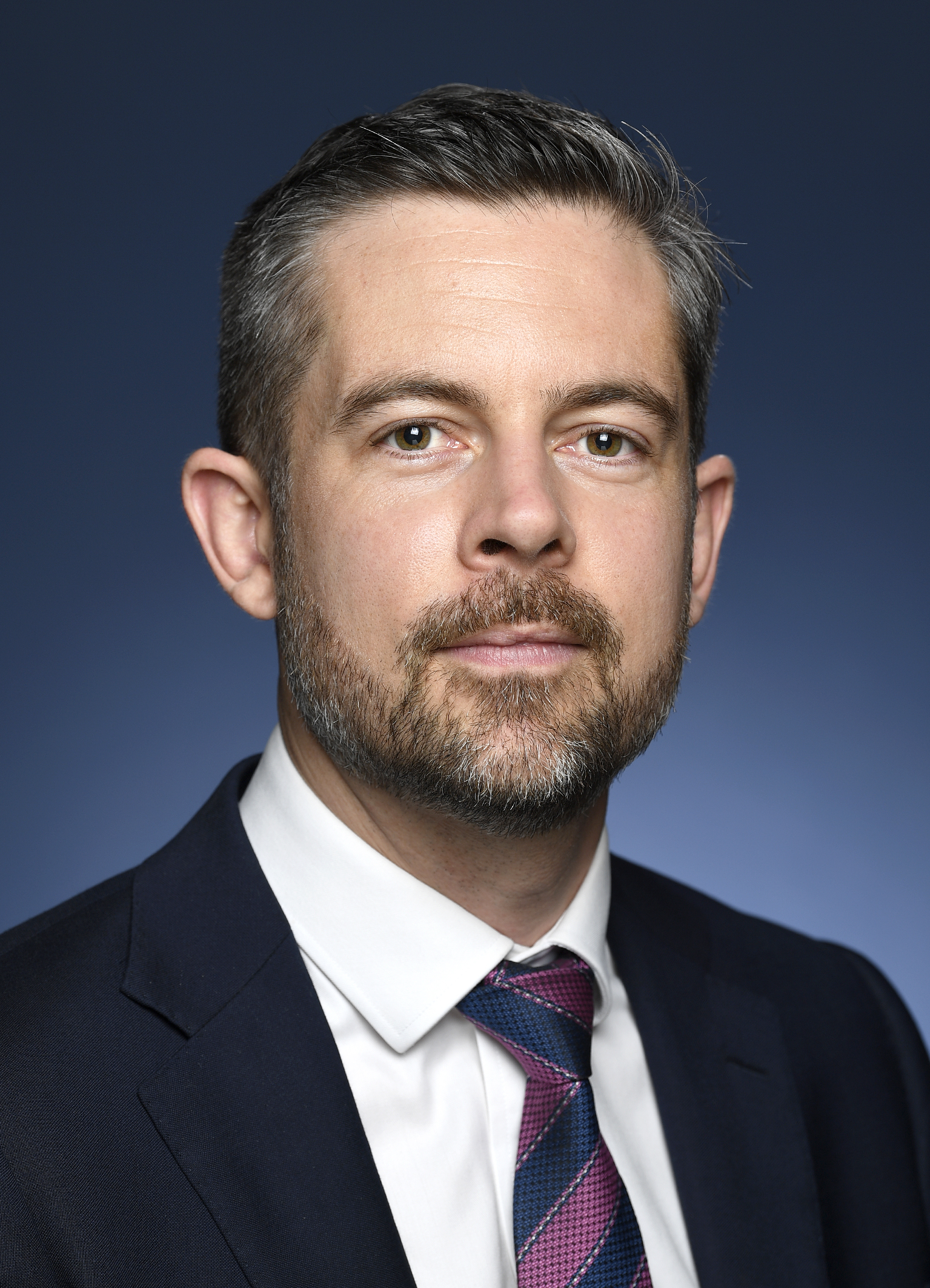
- Incumbent; Edward Russell since 12 April 2022
- Department of Foreign Affairs and Trade
- Style: His Excellency
- Reports to: Minister for Foreign Affairs
- Nominator: Prime Minister of Australia
- Appointer: Governor General of Australia
- Formation: 23 August 2000
- Website: Australian Representative Office, Ramallah

The Australian Representative Office, Ramallah (Arabic: ممثلية أستراليا في رام الله) is the Australian Government's foremost diplomatic presence to the Palestinian Authority in Ramallah. The office is headed by the Australian Representative to the Palestinian Authority, who is an officer of the Australian Department of Foreign Affairs and Trade. The Representative, since April 2022, is Edward Russell.

On 23 August 2000, Australian Foreign Minister, Alexander Downer, announced that the Australian Government would open an Australian Representative Office in the West Bank city of Ramallah, to manage relations with the Palestinian Authority. Speaking of the importance of such an office, Downer said, "At this critical moment in the history of the contemporary Middle East, it is important for Australia to be closely informed of developments, to strengthen its relations with all key parties, and to play a positive and constructive part in support of negotiations to secure a just and comprehensive peace. The decision to establish the Australian Representative Office represents a significant step toward meeting that need." The office opened on 6 September 2000.

== List of Representatives ==
#	Officeholder	Term start date	Term end date	Time in office	Notes
1	Steven Pinhorn	30 November 2000	31 August 2003	1–2 years	
2	Glenn Miles	2003	unknown	unknown	
3	unknown	unknown	2007	unknown	
4	Ben Scott	2007	December 2009	1–2 years	
5	Jenny Grant–Curnow	January 2010	December 2012	2 years, 11 months	
6	Tom Wilson	January 2013	December 2015	2 years, 11 months	
7	Marcia Pius	January 2016	2019	2–3 years	
8	Mark Bailey	June 2019	2022	2–3 years	
9	Edward Russell	12 April 2022	Incumbent	4 years, 148 days	

== See also ==
- Foreign relations of Australia
